= USS L-4 =

L-class submarine of the United States

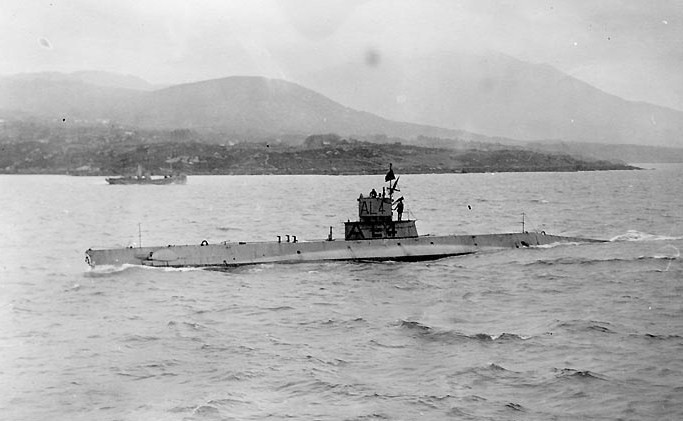
- L-4 underway off Berehaven Ireland, 1918

History

United States
- Name: L-4
- Builder: Fore River Shipbuilding Company, Quincy, Massachusetts
- Cost: $603,863.10 (hull and machinery)
- Laid down: 23 March 1914
- Launched: 3 April 1915
- Commissioned: 4 May 1916
- Decommissioned: 14 April 1922
- Stricken: 14 April 1922
- Identification: Hull symbol: SS-43 (17 July 1920); Call sign: NYQ
- Fate: Sold for scrapping, 28 November 1933

General characteristics
- Type: L-class submarine
- Displacement: 450 long tons (457 t) surfaced; 548 long tons (557 t) submerged
- Length: 167 ft 5 in (51.03 m)
- Beam: 17 ft 5 in (5.31 m)
- Draft: 13 ft 7 in (4.14 m)
- Installed power: 450 hp (340 kW) (diesel engines); 170 hp (130 kW) (electric motors)
- Propulsion: 2 × NELSECO diesel engines; 2 × Electro Dynamic electric motors; 2 × 60-cell batteries; 2 × Propellers
- Speed: 14 kn (26 km/h; 16 mph) surfaced; 10.5 kn (19.4 km/h; 12.1 mph) submerged
- Range: 3,300 nmi (6,100 km; 3,800 mi) at 11 kn (20 km/h; 13 mph) surfaced; 150 nmi (280 km; 170 mi) at 5 kn (9.3 km/h; 5.8 mph) submerged
- Test depth: 200 ft (61 m)
- Capacity: 18,977 US gal (71,840 L; 15,802 imp gal) fuel
- Complement: 2 officers; 26 enlisted
- Armament: 4 × 18 inch (450 mm) bow torpedo tubes (8 torpedoes); 1 × 3 in (76 mm)/23 caliber deck gun

USS L-4 (SS-43), also known as "Submarine No. 43", was an L-class submarine of the United States Navy. She and her sister boats worked on submarine tactics in the Gulf of Mexico, Caribbean, and East Coast, prior to sailing to the Azores, and later stationed in Ireland, during WWI.

== Design ==
The L-class boats designed by Electric Boat (L-1 to L-4 and L-9 to L-11) were built to slightly different specifications from the other L boats, which were designed by Lake Torpedo Boat, and are sometimes considered a separate class. The Electric Boat submarines had a length of 168 ft 6 in (51.4 m) overall, a beam of 17 ft 5 in (5.3 m) and a mean draft of 13 ft 7 in (4.1 m). They displaced 450 long tons (460 t) on the surface and 548 long tons (557 t) submerged. The L-class submarines had a crew of 28 officers and enlisted men. They had a diving depth of 200 feet (61.0 m).

For surface running, the Electric Boat submarines were powered by two 450-brake-horsepower (336 kW) diesel engines, each driving one propeller shaft. When submerged each propeller was driven by a 170-horsepower (127 kW) electric motor. They could reach 14 kn (26 km/h; 16 mph) on the surface and 10.5 kn (19.4 km/h; 12.1 mph) underwater. On the surface, the boats had a range of 5,150 nmi (9,540 km; 5,930 mi) at 11 kn (20 km/h; 13 mph) and 150 nmi (280 km; 170 mi) at 5 kn (9.3 km/h; 5.8 mph) submerged.

The boats were armed with four 18-inch (450 mm) torpedo tubes in the bow. They carried four reloads, for a total of eight torpedoes. The Electric Boat submarines were initially not fitted with a deck gun; a single 3 in (76 mm)/23 caliber on a disappearing mount was added during the war.

== Construction ==
L-4's keel was laid down on 23 March 1914, by Fore River Shipbuilding Company, in Quincy, Massachusetts. She was launched on 3 April 1915, sponsored by Mrs. Stephen A. Gardner, and commissioned at the Boston Navy Yard, on 4 May 1916.

== Service history ==
=== 1916 ===
L-4 was initially assigned to the Fifth Division, Submarine Flotilla, Atlantic Fleet, as of 5 May 1916, and she conducted her shakedown in the waters off New England, from 4 May–22 June 1916. After these exercises, she proceeded to the Philadelphia Navy Yard, where she remained until 1 July. L-4 operated with Division Five, until the need for battery repairs forced her in to New London, Connecticut. She remained there through 13 September, and then proceeded to the Boston Navy Yard, in company with the destroyer Macdonough. Both arrived later that day. After a short overhaul, she departed Boston, on 27 October, and continued to conduct training in the waters off New England, until 2 December. The submarine conducted her first preliminary torpedo practice in Block Island Sound, on 28 November. Making her way southward, via the Delaware Breakwater, Hampton Roads, Virginia, and the Norfolk Navy Yard, in Portsmouth, Virginia, she arrived at Key West, Florida on 23 December, where she spent the Christmas holidays, before arriving at Havana, Cuba, on 30 December.

=== 1917 ===
Having spent the New Years' holidays at Havana, L-4 cleared the Cuban capital on 2 January 1917, and arrived, later that day at Key West. Remaining there until 22 January, she got underway bound for Pensacola, Florida, via the Dry Tortugas, and arriving at her destination, on 28 January. She spent the succeeding weeks operating along the Gulf coast, from Pensacola and Mobile, Alabama, well into March.

During this time, the Atlantic Fleet was conducting its annual winter training in the waters off Cuba, when Imperial German's resumption of unrestricted submarine warfare on 1 February, resulted in increased tensions with the US. The fleet initially consolidated in Guacanayabo Bay, Cuba, then re-located to the sheltered waters of the lower Chesapeake Bay and the York River, Virginia.

L-4 was dispatched to Galveston, Texas, during this time, and was then forced to go to Pensacola, where she was required to engage in engine repair work that required the removal of deck plates and the hoisting of a burnt out armature. Making her way back to the Virginia capes, via Key West, L-4 arrived at Hampton Roads, on 5 April.

The day following her arrival, 6 April 1917, the US declared war on Germany and entered the Great War. The day of this declaration, L-4 shifted to the Norfolk Navy Yard. Upon clearing the yard on April 16, she moved up the York River, and joined the fleet assets at Yorktown, Virginia. The submarines of the flotilla operated in the Chesapeake Bay, conducting tactical exercises with a number of the fleet's surface vessels in Tangier Sound. On 4 May, Bushnell, along with L-1, L-2, L-3, and L-4, departed from York Spit, Virginia, bound for the Philadelphia Navy Yard, and arrived the next day. On 6 May, L-3 and L-4 collided with Swallow, at the Philadelphia Navy Yard. Admiral Henry T. Mayo, Commander, Atlantic Fleet, issued letters of reprimand to the commanding officers of L-3 and L-4, for their improper handling of their boats and "carelessness in the performance of duty".

In June 1917, Vice Admiral William S. Sims, Commander, US Naval Forces in European Waters, in June 1917, cited British success in using submarines as submarine hunter-killers in antisubmarine warfare (ASW). The Allied submarines, with their lower profiles, could approach U-boats more stealthily than larger surface patrol vessels. On 2 July, Admiral William S. Benson, Chief of Naval Operations, ordered the twelve most suitable submarines on the Atlantic coast be fitted out for duty in European waters. L-4 underwent extensive overhaul at Philadelphia, to prepare her for distant service. On 14 November, the boat departed Philadelphia, and conducted submerged and surface maneuvers off Lewes, Delaware, and returned that night.

L-4, in company with L-1, L-2, L-3, L-9, L-10, and L-11, along with E-class submarine E-1, and the submarine tenders Bushnell, with Captain Thomas C. Hart, Commander, Submarine Flotilla embarked, and Fulton, cleared Philadelphia, on 18 November 1917, and proceeded to New London, Base No. 22, via Montauk Point, New York, and arrived on 20 November. She then conducted maneuvers in Long Island Sound, until 29 November, before moving on to the Torpedo Station, at Newport, Rhode Island, From there, L-4 departed on 4 December, bound for European waters via Melville, Rhode Island. Having charted a direct course to the Azores, Hart's force ran into a gale which scattered them and required them to pause and re-assemble at the Royal Naval Dockyard, Bermuda, Base No. 24, on 13 December.

=== 1918 ===
After a period at Bermuda, L-4 departed on 1 January 1918, bound for the Azores. She arrived at Ponta Delgada, Base No. 13, in company with fleet tug Genesee, L-3, and E-1, on 12 January 1918. Dispatched to the British Isles, Bushnell, Genesee, and the submarines L-1, L-2, L-4, L-10, and L-11, stood out from Ponta Delgada, on 22 January. They reached Queenstown, now known as Cobh, Base No. 6, Ireland, on 27 January 1918.

Upon arrival in the war zone, in order to differentiate them from the British L-class submarines, the US boats were re-designated with the suffix "A" (American) and the letters and numerals identifying them were painted onto the fairwaters of the US boats.

The commander of the forward deployed US submarines was Captain Hart, on board Bushnell. Though under the nominal command of Vice Admiral Sims, Hart's US submarines in Ireland, came under Vice Admiral Sir Lewis Bayly, RN, Commander-in-Chief, Coast of Ireland, and his submarine commander, Captain Sir Martin E. Nasmith, later Dunbar-Nasmith, RN. Bayly initially ordered Hart to deploy only one of his submarines at a time at sea, and that Royal Navy officers were to always be informed of departures and returns. Their patrol area was also to be limited to seaward of the Fastnet Lighthouse, so as to keep clear of British patrols and to avoid potentially fatal friendly-fire incidents.

The base at Queenstown, proved unsatisfactory for Lieutenant Commander Harold M. Bemis' Division Five, as it was also serving as the headquarters for the surface patrol forces. As a result, the US submarines were relocated to a base at Castletownbere (Berehaven), Bantry Bay, on 5 February.

In the ensuing days, from 6–16 February, the division trained in Bantry Bay, conducting dives and tactical maneuvers under the charge of the commander of the Royal Navy's Submarine Flotilla, also based at Berehaven. US submarine officers also trained with a "submarine attack war game" apparatus on board the submarine depot ship HMS Vulcan.

The American submarines' patrols were to be based on eight-day rotations, there would be eight days on patrol and eight days in port for overhaul, re-provision, and rest in preparation for the next eight-day patrol.

On 1 March, AL-4 received orders to proceed to the Haulbowline yard, at Queenstown, with AL-2, under the escort of the sloop HMS Crocus. They secured alongside Melville, in Queenstown, on 6 March. When her maintenance work was completed, she cleared the yard and headed for a return to Berehaven.

While enroute from Queenstown to Berehaven, on 20 March 1918, AL-4 sighted a periscope about 300 yd (900 ft; 270 m) broad on her starboard bow. Her commanding officer put her rudder hard right and passed over the spot where she had observed the submarine. The periscope disappeared, the enemy craft evidently diving to evade the US submarine. Several weeks later, on 12 April, AL-4 sighted a submarine and fired a torpedo, but with negative results. While on patrol again within a fortnight, on 24 April, AL-4 was running on the surface and sighted a submarine at a range of approximately 1,000 yd (3,000 ft; 910 m). She closed range and fired a torpedo at the suspected U-boat, but it never detonated. AL-4 then made for her with the intention of ramming, but the German boat dived too quickly and escaped with no further contact. The submarine, on 1 May, returned to her base at Berehaven. On 18 May, AL-4 was underway while on patrol when on a dive an inexperienced crewmember opened the wrong valve and caused a loss of control that placed the submarine in danger. The situation was quickly corrected and the boat did not founder.

While underway on 1 June 1918, in poor visibility, the submarine spotted Terry about 4,000 yd (2.3 mi; 3.7 km) astern. When the destroyer spotted AL-4, she changed course and sped toward the submarine. When the submarine deployed a smoke grenade, it exploded and caused Terry to believe that she was being fired upon. The destroyer opened fire with her forward gun, and eventually straddled the submarine. The submarine then detonated two smoke grenades, which deployed appropriately, and she turned into the wind to slow down. With that the destroyer ceased firing and proceeded south while dispatching a warning that there was a German U-boat reported in the area. AL-4 returned to her base the next day.

The boat got underway for her eighth war patrol, on 12 July 1918. Enroute, she engaged in a training exercise with target runs on AL-2, in Bantry Bay. Having completed the exercise, she cleared the bay enroute to patrol station "QA", via "Route A". At 07:08, she sighted a vessel two points on the port bow. Suspecting that it was a U-boat, AL-4 submerged to attack. As she closed with the ship, the latter proved to be a trawler. She then changed direction and later surfaced and continued her transit to the patrol area. Later in the summer, on 30 August, AL-4 was mistaken for a U-boat while on patrol and fired upon by two different armed merchantmen four miles (6.4 km) west of the Fastnet lighthouse. In all twenty shots were fired, despite AL-4 repeatedly flashing recognition signals. The boat was not hit and she dived and ran submerged to break contact.

AL-4 was at Devonport, England, from 1 September–15 October, undergoing refit and overhaul. She received orders directing her to remain at Devonport, for a week after her yard work, to carry out experiments in conjunction with US submarine chasers stationed there. Afterward, she was to proceed to Queenstown. She departed Plymouth, England, Base No. 27, on 21 October, enroute to Bantry Bay. She remained at Berehaven, and operated in Bantry Bay, from 25 October–22 November. During this period, on 11 November, the Armistice went into effect and "The Great War" ceased.

AL-4 departed Berehaven, on 22 November 1918, and shifted to Queenstown. She cleared Base No. 6, on 25 November, and made her way to Portland, England, in company with AL-10. Both submarines arrived the next day. On 7 December, 15 members of AL-4's company traveled to Harwich, England, for duty in connection with surrendered German U-boats. The US submariners assisted the board inspecting U-164, which had only been commissioned on 17 October 1918, a little over a month prior to the Armistice. On 1 January 1919, U-164 was turned over to the British in good condition, she was later broken up in 1922.

=== 1919-1922 ===
AL-4's crewmen returned to Portland, and on 3 January 1919, the submarine stood out from the harbor, in company with Bushnell, and the other boats of Division Five, bound for the US, via the Azores. Arriving at Ponta Delgada, on 13 January, they departed the next day and proceeded to Bermuda. Reaching their destination on 26 January, they remained two days to refuel and re-provision, and then departed for Philadelphia. They stood in to the Philadelphia Navy Yard, on 1 February.

While at the Philadelphia Navy Yard, L-4 underwent a post-deployment refit and overhaul until 26 May. Clearing the yard, she shifted to Hampton Roads, where she arrived the following day. She operated from the Submarine Base, through the remainder of the year. During this time L-4, in company with L-11 sailed up the Chesapeake Bay, and visited the US Naval Academy, at Annapolis, Maryland. Early in January 1920, the submarine sailed up the James River, to visit Richmond, Virginia. While at the Virginia capital, the submarine embarked Governor Westmoreland Davis, and then submerged for dinner. L-4 departed Hampton Roads, on 22 January, bound for Bermuda, she arrived on January 25. She stood back in to the Submarine Base, on 11 February. For the remainder of the year the submarine operated from Hampton Roads, primarily in the waters off the Virginia capes, training and conducting experiments with the other units of the division, developing underwater warfare tactics. During this period, on 17 July 1920, she was redesignated SS-43 as part of a Navy-wide administrative re-organization. Five days later, she and submarines L-3, L-9, L-11, M-1, E-1, and E-2, were made available for drydocking at the Norfolk Navy Yard.

On 16 November 1920, L-4 was ordered to prepare to transfer to the Submarine Repair Division, at the Philadelphia Navy Yard. She arrived at the Philadelphia Navy Yard, under tow, on 9 January 1921. On 26 March, the Submarine Repair Division was abolished and L-4 was transferred to Submarine Division Three, and remained in an inactive status at the Philadelphia Navy Yard.

== Fate ==
The Navy contemplated, on 23 August 1921, installing the main engines of the United States N-class submarines in the L-class submarines. The work was to take place at Submarine Base, headquartered afloat in the patrol vessel Eagle 33, New London. Instead, L-4 was decommissioned at the Philadelphia Navy Yard, and stricken from the Navy Register on 14 April 1922. L-4 was sold to the Pottstown Steel Company, in Douglassville, Pennsylvania, on 31 July 1922, for scrapping. She was delivered to the purchaser and removed from the Philadelphia Navy Yard, on 6 September 1922.

== Bibliography ==
- "Table 21 - Ships on Navy List June 30, 1919". Congressional Serial Set. U.S. Government Printing Office: 767. 1921.
- Mohl, Michael. "L-4 (SS-43)". Navsource.net.
- Friedman, Norman (1995). U.S. Submarines Through 1945: An Illustrated Design History. Annapolis, Maryland: Naval Institute Press. ISBN 1-55750-263-3.
- Gardiner, Robert & Gray, Randal (1985). Conway's All the World's Fighting Ships 1906–1921. Annapolis, Maryland: Naval Institute Press. ISBN 0-85177-245-5.
- Havern, Christopher B. Sr (12 June 2018). "L-4 (Submarine No. 43)". Dictionary of American Naval Fighting Ships. Navy Department, Naval History and Heritage Command. This article incorporates text from this source, which is in the public domain.
