= USS L-2 =

L-class submarine of the United States

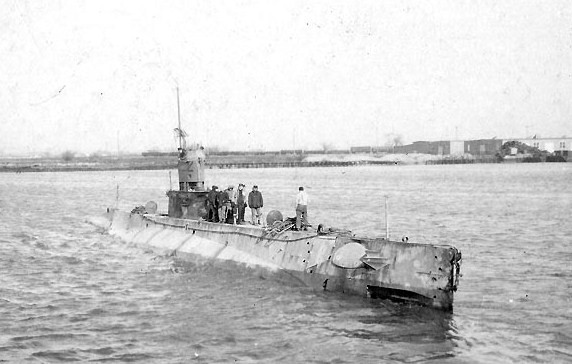
- USS L-2 off the Philadelphia Navy Yard, c. February 1919

History

United States
- Name: L-2
- Builder: Fore River Shipbuilding Company, Quincy, Massachusetts
- Cost: $603,953.91 (hull and machinery)
- Laid down: 19 March 1914
- Launched: 11 February 1915
- Commissioned: 29 September 1916
- Decommissioned: 4 May 1923
- Stricken: 18 December 1930
- Identification: Hull symbol: SS-41 (17 July 1920); Call sign: NYO
- Fate: Sold for scrapping, 28 November 1933

General characteristics
- Type: L-class submarine
- Displacement: 450 long tons (457 t) surfaced; 548 long tons (557 t) submerged
- Length: 167 ft 5 in (51.03 m)
- Beam: 17 ft 5 in (5.31 m)
- Draft: 13 ft 7 in (4.14 m)
- Installed power: 450 hp (340 kW) (diesel engines); 170 hp (130 kW) (electric motors)
- Propulsion: 2 × NELSECO diesel engines; 2 × Electro Dynamic electric motors; 2 × 60-cell batteries; 2 × Propellers
- Speed: 14 kn (26 km/h; 16 mph) surfaced; 10.5 kn (19.4 km/h; 12.1 mph) submerged
- Range: 3,300 nmi (6,100 km; 3,800 mi) at 11 kn (20 km/h; 13 mph) surfaced; 150 nmi (280 km; 170 mi) at 5 kn (9.3 km/h; 5.8 mph) submerged
- Test depth: 200 ft (61 m)
- Capacity: 18,977 US gal (71,840 L; 15,802 imp gal) fuel
- Complement: 2 officers; 26 enlisted
- Armament: 4 × 18 inch (450 mm) bow torpedo tubes (8 torpedoes); 1 × 3 in (76 mm)/23 caliber deck gun

USS L-2 (SS-41), also known as "Submarine No. 41", was an L-class submarine of the United States Navy. She and her sister boats worked on submarine tactics in the Gulf of Mexico, Caribbean, and East Coast, prior to sailing to the Azores, and later stationed in Ireland, during WWI.

== Design ==
The L-class boats designed by Electric Boat (L-1 to L-4 and L-9 to L-11) were built to slightly different specifications from the other L boats, which were designed by Lake Torpedo Boat, and are sometimes considered a separate class. The Electric Boat submarines had a length of 168 ft 6 in (51.4 m) overall, a beam of 17 ft 5 in (5.3 m) and a mean draft of 13 ft 7 in (4.1 m). They displaced 450 long tons (460 t) on the surface and 548 long tons (557 t) submerged. The L-class submarines had a crew of 28 officers and enlisted men. They had a diving depth of 200 feet (61.0 m).

For surface running, the Electric Boat submarines were powered by two 450-brake-horsepower (336 kW) diesel engines, each driving one propeller shaft. When submerged each propeller was driven by a 170-horsepower (127 kW) electric motor. They could reach 14 kn (26 km/h; 16 mph) on the surface and 10.5 kn (19.4 km/h; 12.1 mph) underwater. On the surface, the boats had a range of 5,150 nmi (9,540 km; 5,930 mi) at 11 kn (20 km/h; 13 mph) and 150 nmi (280 km; 170 mi) at 5 kn (9.3 km/h; 5.8 mph) submerged.

The boats were armed with four 18-inch (450 mm) torpedo tubes in the bow. They carried four reloads, for a total of eight torpedoes. The Electric Boat submarines were initially not fitted with a deck gun; a single 3 in (76 mm)/23 caliber on a disappearing mount was added during the war.

== Construction ==
L-2's keel was laid down on 19 March 1914, by the Fore River Shipbuilding Company, in Quincy, Massachusetts. She was launched on 11 February 1915, sponsored by Mrs. Russel Gray, and commissioned on 29 September 1916.

== Service history ==
=== 1916 ===
Upon being commissioned at the Boston Navy Yard, on 29 September 1916, L-2 reported for duty with Division Five, Submarine Flotilla, Atlantic Fleet, on 2 October 1916. She continued fitting out and training out of Boston, until 26 October, after which she then proceeded to the Torpedo Station, at Newport, Rhode Island, to take on her torpedo outfit, from 26–28 October. She then continued her shakedown training in the waters off New England, and in Long Island Sound, until 30 November. After taking a sick sailor to Newport, she set a course southward on 1 December, and after a pause off the Delaware Breakwater, from 5–7 December, L-2 continued on to the Norfolk Navy Yard, Portsmouth, Virginia, and Key West, Florida, undergoing overhaul at the latter, before arriving at Havana, Cuba, for liberty on 30 December.

=== 1917 ===
L-2 spent the New Year's holidays in port before departing Havana, on 2 January 1917, arriving at Key West, later that same day. She remained until 22 January, before departing for the Dry Tortugas, Florida, enroute to Pensacola, Florida. Reaching her destination on 28 January, she remained there until 17 February, when she shifted to Mobile, Alabama, from 17–21 February, before returning to Pensacola, on February 21.

While the submarine was at Pensacola, tensions with Imperial Germany increased with that nation's resumption of unrestricted submarine warfare on 1 February. As a result, the annual Atlantic Fleet winter exercises in the waters off Cuba were cut short. After initial consolidation in Cuba's Guacanayabo Bay, the fleet relocated to the sheltered waters of lower Chesapeake Bay, by 31 March.

On 9 March, L-2 got underway for Force Exercise 7B, and operated with ex-monitor, turned submarine tender, Tallahassee, and the protected cruiser Columbia, in the waters of the Gulf of Mexico. With the fleet consolidating, L-2 departed Pensacola, on 27 March. Transiting via Key West, she reached Hampton Roads, Virginia, Base No. 3, on 5 April.

The following day, 6 April 1917, the US declared war on Germany and L-2 shifted to the Norfolk Navy Yard. On 13 April, L-2 was alongside Bailey, at Norfolk, engaged in minor structural work and repairs by the crew. She received orders to mobilize that same day. The submarine spent the remainder of the month undergoing modifications to engage in operations and conducted training. She shifted to the York River, at Yorktown, Virginia, Base No. 2, on 16 April. A fortnight later, L-2 cleared Yorktown, at 08:00, on 30 April, and proceeded with submarine tender Bushnell, and her sister boats L-1, and L-3, in formation to join the fleet's battleships at Tangier Sound, Virginia, Base No. 1. L-2 departed York Spit, Virginia, on 4 May, bound for the Philadelphia Navy Yard, in company with Bushnell, L-1, L-3, and L-4. All arrived without incident on 6 May.

In June 1917, Vice Admiral William S. Sims, Commander, US Naval Forces in European Waters, in June 1917, cited British success in using submarines as submarine hunter-killers in antisubmarine warfare (ASW). The Allied submarines, with their lower profiles, could approach U-boats more stealthily than larger surface patrol vessels. On 2 July, Admiral William S. Benson, Chief of Naval Operations, ordered the twelve most suitable submarines on the Atlantic coast be fitted out for duty in European waters. L-2 underwent extensive overhaul at Philadelphia, to prepare her for distant service. With that work completed, she conducted exercises to test equipment on 14 November. As a result of the tests all unsatisfactory work was rectified, 15–17 November, in advance of deployment.

L-2, in tow of Conestoga, in company with L-1, L-3, L-4, L-9, L-10, and L-11, along with E-class submarine E-1, and the submarine tenders Bushnell, with Captain Thomas C. Hart, Commander, Submarine Flotilla embarked, and Fulton, cleared Philadelphia, on 18 November 1917, and proceeded to New London, Base No. 22, via Montauk Point, New York, and arrived on 20 November. She shifted to the Torpedo Station, at Newport, on 22 November, and then returned that same day to New London. She conducted exercises in Long Island Sound, with a simulated attack on the fleet tug Genesee.

They departed on November 27, bound for Melville, Rhode Island, where they received lubricating and fuel oil and provisions. Clearing Melville, on 4 December, Hart charted a direct course to the Azores, but his force ran into a gale which scattered the units and required them to pause and re-assemble at Bermuda, Base No. 24, on 13 December. L-2 continued on and reached Fayal Island, Azores, on December 17. She then proceeded into Ponta Delgada, Base No. 13, Azores, the next day.

After provisioning, refueling, and conducting overhaul until 30 December, she stood out of the harbor and patrolled in relief of L-10 on December 31. Though there were reports of U-boats having sunk a ship around the Azores, she conducted the patrol without incident.

=== 1918 ===
After conducting several patrols amidst the islands of the Azores archipelago in January 1918, L-2 and the other units of Division Five departed Ponta Delgada, on 19 January and proceeded to Ireland.

In order to differentiate them from the British L-class submarine, the US submarines were re-designated with the prefix “A” (American) and that letter was painted onto the fairwaters of the US boats.

L-2 arrived at Queenstown, now known as Cobh, Base No. 6, Ireland, on 27 January 1918, escorted by US destroyers. She anchored that evening and then went alongside Bushnell, the next day. Though under the nominal command of Vice Admiral Sims, Hart's US submarines in Ireland, came under Vice Admiral Sir Lewis Bayly, RN, Commander-in-Chief, Coast of Ireland, and his submarine commander, Captain Sir Martin E. Nasmith, later Dunbar-Nasmith, RN. Bayly initially ordered Hart to deploy only one of his submarines at a time at sea, and that Royal Navy officers were to always be informed of departures and returns. Their patrol area was also to be limited to seaward of the Fastnet Lighthouse, so as to keep clear of British patrols and to avoid potentially fatal friendly-fire incidents.

The base at Queenstown, proved unsatisfactory for Lieutenant Commander Harold M. Bemis' Division Five, as it was also serving as the headquarters for the surface patrol forces. As a result, the US submarines were relocated to a base at Castletownbere (Berehaven), Bantry Bay.

In the ensuing days, 6–16 February, the division trained in Bantry Bay, conducting dives and tactical maneuvers under the charge of the commander of the Royal Navy's Submarine Flotilla also based at Berehaven. US submarine officers also trained with a “submarine attack war game” apparatus on board the submarine depot ship HMS Vulcan.

The US submarines' patrols were to be based on eight-day rotations, there would be eight days on patrol and eight days in port for overhaul, re-provision, and rest in preparation for the next eight-day patrol.

AL-2, in company with AL-4 and escorted by the sloop HMS Crocus, proceeded to Queenstown, on 2 March. She then stood out of Base No. 6, on 18 March, to conduct an ASW patrol. She continued to rotate in patrol duty, typically for eight days, with the other boats of the division in the succeeding months.

AL-2 got underway in Bantry Bay, on 25 May 1918. After initially exercising with AL-11, she continued on to her patrol billet QB. While enroute on 26 May, she sighted a ship resembling an enemy submarine on the surface bearing 300º about six miles (9.7 km) distant. She raised speed and headed for the vessel and confirmed that she was a German U-boat. She then submerged and made her approach, but was unable to hear anything on her C-tube or see her in the periscope. She then surfaced at 09:05, with negative contact. She then continued into her patrol sector. When at the western edge, she again sighted a conning tower at 15:42, three miles (4.8 km) distant. She again submerged and made her approach. Having sighted it again through the periscope and heard it faintly through the C-tube, she could not confirm that it was an enemy submarine. She then surfaced and having encountered two merchantmen, she hoisted her colors. Shortly thereafter, she again sighted a vessel dead ahead. Believing it to be a submarine she submerged to make her approach. Observing the vessel through the periscope, there was a consensus that it was an enemy submarine. The torpedo tubes were flooded, but as the identity of the target could not be confirmed they did not engage though they did maneuver to close range on a firing course. In the end, AL-2 broke contact and then surfaced to charge her batteries. A week later, while on patrol, she was sighted by a surface patrol craft, which immediately maneuvered for an attack. The submarine fired a night grenade and then there was an exchange of recognition signals that forestalled an attack. Later that day, a British seaplane passed above and the submarine again deployed a recognition signal in order to forestall taking friendly fire. Continuing on patrol, a submarine was detected surfacing and AL-2 maneuvered accordingly, but no further positive contact was gained.

AL-2 was on patrol enroute to a return to Berehaven, during the morning of 10 July 1918, when she encountered Parker and McCall heading toward her. She made a challenge with her blinker and fired smoke bombs as recognition signals, but received no reply. One of the destroyers then opened fire on her at 6,000 yd (3.4 mi; 5.5 km). The submarine fired five additional smoke bombs and continued signaling with her Aldis lamp. The destroyer fired a total of five rounds, with no hits, and finally ceased firing after recognizing the signals and closing to a distance of 2,000 yd (1.1 mi; 1.8 km). The submarine continued in toward Berehaven. Later, at 17:55, about 15 mi (24 km) south of the Fastnet Lighthouse, a lookout sighted a dark object three points off the starboard bow which was believed to be a nun buoy. The boat then changed course and continued and the object disappeared. At 18:30, AL-2 reported that a torpedo from an enemy submarine was fired at her and detonated 200 ft (61 m) from her engine room. The periscope of the enemy was plainly visible on the starboard quarter about 80 yd (240 ft; 73 m) distant. The submarine's commanding officer, went hard left rudder and made a crash dive to a depth of about 70 ft (21 m) and listened for the enemy. Her logbook stated that "Submarines were plainly heard. Attempts made to chase one of them submerged. Heard several oscillator signals from one of the two enemy submarines. At 19:40 one submarine ahead died out of listening range southward; the one being chased stopped". Her subsequent report stated that AL-2 dived to ram the enemy submarine after the torpedo explosion. The enemy was dead ahead and the chase began. Within minutes two submarines were reported, one to the northward fairly close. The one southward could only be heard, but it was this U-boat which AL-2 began to chase. Eventually losing the southerly submarine, AL-2 circled back over two hours in an attempt to re-establish contact with the U-boat initially detected to the north. Despite multiple stops of her engines to listen for the enemy, AL-2 never re-established contact. She then surfaced and submitted her report of the contact via wireless to Bushnell, at Bantry Bay. AL-2 reported hearing an explosion from an unknown source and believed that it might have destroyed the U-boat. After this engagement, AL-2 finished her patrol and returned to Berehaven, the following day.

The U-boat to which AL-2 gave chase on 10 July 1918, was believed to have been UB-65. While AL-2 believed that UB-65 may have been destroyed in the aforementioned explosion, and her commanding officer later received a Distinguished Service Medal for his role in what was believed to have been the destruction of the enemy, the German Admiralty later adjudicated in March 1930, that UB-65 actually sank as the result of an accident with the loss of all 37 souls off Padstow, Cornwall, England, on or after 14 July 1918.

The following month, on 25 August 1918, AL-2 was again underway on patrol when she reported a likely encounter with a submarine. She reported hearing the submarine, but given the rough seas running at that time, she dared not attempt to make a visual contact with her periscope as her tower would be visible in the troughs. She also reported a possible contact three days later, but given that her batteries were almost expended, she was unable to give chase. AL-2, on 24 September 1918, cleared Berehaven, bound for Devonport, England, to train with US submarine chasers based at Plymouth, England. The end of hostilities on 11 November, found AL-2 still based from Plymouth.

AL-2 departed Plymouth, for the dockyard at Portland, England, on 10 December 1918, making arrival the next day. She remained at Portland, through the end of the year, preparing for her homebound transit.

=== 1919-1924 ===
AL-2 stood out of Portland, to return to the US, on 3 January 1919. Proceeding via the Azores, she reached Ponta Delgada, on 10 January, and secured alongside Yarnall, before later shifting to Bushnell. She cleared Ponta Delgada, on 14 January, bound for Bermuda, Base No. 24. She reached the Royal Naval Dockyard, Bermuda, on 26 January, and secured alongside Bushnell. After refueling and provisioning, she stood out on 28 January, and headed for the Philadelphia Navy Yard, where she arrived on 1 February.

After her return to the US, the submarine underwent post-deployment overhaul and repairs, at Philadelphia. When returned to operational duty, she experimented with torpedo and undersea detection techniques and equipment along the Atlantic Coast. Again known as L-2, the submarine was re-designated as SS-41, on 17 July 1920, as part of a Navy-wide administrative re-organization. She went in to the Norfolk Navy Yard, in August 1920, and then cleared on 15 September. On 16 November, L-2 received orders transferring her homeport and that of L-1, L-3, L-4, L-9, L-10, L-11, and M-1, from Submarine Base, headquartered afloat in Eagle 17, Hampton Roads, to the Submarine Repair Division, Philadelphia Navy Yard. The Submarine Repair Division was subsequently abolished, on 26 March 1921, and the submarines were assigned to Submarine Division Three, in an inactive status.

L-2 was brought in to the Philadelphia Navy Yard, under tow of the tug Kalmia, on 3 February 1921. The submarine was then ordered to transfer to Submarine Base, Eagle 33, New London, for the installation of new main engines from N-class submarines, on 23 August 1921. She later arrived under tow of Kalmia at New London, on 21 September. L-2 was considered to be in commission, in reserve, effective 5 December 1921. As of 18 April 1922, L-2, along with L-3, L-9, and L-11, were considered to be in good operating condition as second line submarines. Despite this assessment, L-2 was placed in reduced commission at New London, on 1 May 1922, along with L-3, L-9, L-11, N-1, N-2, and N-3. Just over a week later, on 9 May, L-2 was assigned to Submarine Division Zero, at New London.

On 12 January 1923, she cleared New London, bound for the Portsmouth Navy Yard, Kittery, Maine. Arriving on 14 January, she docked until 9 March, when she cleared the yard to make her return up the Thames River to New London, the next day. She the departed New London, and proceeded to the Submarine Base, at Hampton Roads, reaching there on March 15. L-2 decommissioned at Hampton Roads, on 4 May 1923. Eleven months later, on 4 April 1924, the Navy issued orders directing that L-2, and 25 other submarines, be towed to the Philadelphia Navy Yard. She went into dry dock, from 3 June-17 July, then on 18 August, was taken under tow by the minesweeper Owl and arrived at the Philadelphia Navy Yard, on 19 August.

== Fate ==
Stricken from the Navy Registry on 18 December 1930, L-2 was sold to the Pottstown Steel Company, in Douglassville, Pennsylvania, on 25 June 1933, and scrapped in accordance with the terms of the London Naval Treaty, on 28 November.

== Bibliography ==
- "Table 21 - Ships on Navy List June 30, 1919". Congressional Serial Set. U.S. Government Printing Office: 767. 1921.
- Priolo, Gary. "L-2 (SS-41)". Navsource.net.
- Friedman, Norman (1995). U.S. Submarines Through 1945: An Illustrated Design History. Annapolis, Maryland: Naval Institute Press. ISBN 1-55750-263-3.
- Gardiner, Robert & Gray, Randal (1985). Conway's All the World's Fighting Ships 1906–1921. Annapolis, Maryland: Naval Institute Press. ISBN 0-85177-245-5.
- Havern, Christopher B. Sr (10 May 2021). "L-2 (Submarine No. 41)". Dictionary of American Naval Fighting Ships. Navy Department, Naval History and Heritage Command. This article incorporates text from this source, which is in the public domain.
