= USS L-3 =

L-class submarine of the United States

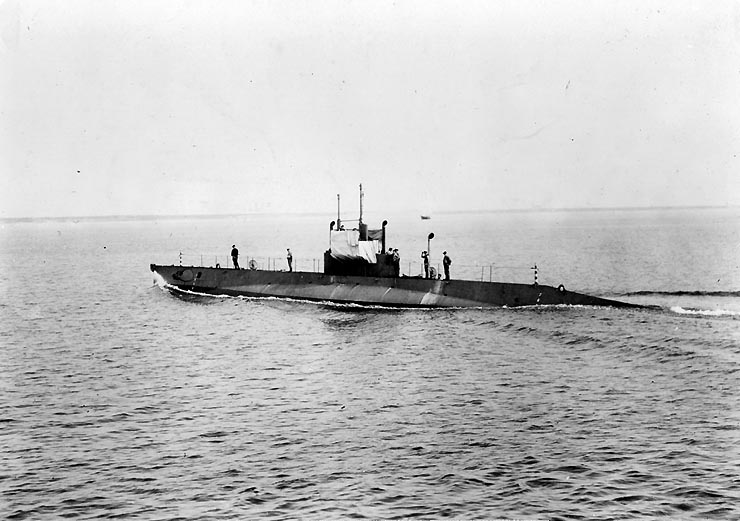
- USS L-3 running trials off Provincetown, Massachusetts, September 1915

History

United States
- Name: L-3
- Builder: Fore River Shipbuilding Company, Quincy, Massachusetts
- Cost: $604,192.53 (hull and machinery)
- Laid down: 18 April 1914
- Launched: 15 March 1915
- Commissioned: 22 April 1916
- Decommissioned: 11 June 1923
- Stricken: 18 December 1930
- Identification: Hull symbol: SS-42 (17 July 1920); Call sign: NYP
- Fate: Sold for scrapping, 28 November 1933

General characteristics
- Type: L-class submarine
- Displacement: 450 long tons (457 t) surfaced; 548 long tons (557 t) submerged
- Length: 167 ft 5 in (51.03 m)
- Beam: 17 ft 5 in (5.31 m)
- Draft: 13 ft 7 in (4.14 m)
- Installed power: 450 hp (340 kW) (diesel engines); 170 hp (130 kW) (electric motors)
- Propulsion: 2 × NELSECO diesel engines; 2 × Electro Dynamic electric motors; 2 × 60-cell batteries; 2 × Propellers
- Speed: 14 kn (26 km/h; 16 mph) surfaced; 10.5 kn (19.4 km/h; 12.1 mph) submerged
- Range: 3,300 nmi (6,100 km; 3,800 mi) at 11 kn (20 km/h; 13 mph) surfaced; 150 nmi (280 km; 170 mi) at 5 kn (9.3 km/h; 5.8 mph) submerged
- Test depth: 200 ft (61 m)
- Capacity: 18,977 US gal (71,840 L; 15,802 imp gal) fuel
- Complement: 2 officers; 26 enlisted
- Armament: 4 × 18 inch (450 mm) bow torpedo tubes (8 torpedoes); 1 × 3 in (76 mm)/23 caliber deck gun

USS L-3 (SS-42), also known as "Submarine No. 42", was an L-class submarine of the United States Navy. She and her sister boats worked on submarine tactics in the Gulf of Mexico, Caribbean, and East Coast, prior to sailing to the Azores, and later stationed in Ireland, during WWI.

== Design ==
The L-class boats designed by Electric Boat (L-1 to L-4 and L-9 to L-11) were built to slightly different specifications from the other L boats, which were designed by Lake Torpedo Boat, and are sometimes considered a separate class. The Electric Boat submarines had a length of 168 ft 6 in (51.4 m) overall, a beam of 17 ft 5 in (5.3 m) and a mean draft of 13 ft 7 in (4.1 m). They displaced 450 long tons (460 t) on the surface and 548 long tons (557 t) submerged. The L-class submarines had a crew of 28 officers and enlisted men. They had a diving depth of 200 feet (61.0 m).

For surface running, the Electric Boat submarines were powered by two 450-brake-horsepower (336 kW) diesel engines, each driving one propeller shaft. When submerged each propeller was driven by a 170-horsepower (127 kW) electric motor. They could reach 14 kn (26 km/h; 16 mph) on the surface and 10.5 kn (19.4 km/h; 12.1 mph) underwater. On the surface, the boats had a range of 5,150 nmi (9,540 km; 5,930 mi) at 11 kn (20 km/h; 13 mph) and 150 nmi (280 km; 170 mi) at 5 kn (9.3 km/h; 5.8 mph) submerged.

The boats were armed with four 18-inch (450 mm) torpedo tubes in the bow. They carried four reloads, for a total of eight torpedoes. The Electric Boat submarines were initially not fitted with a deck gun; a single 3 in (76 mm)/23 caliber on a disappearing mount was added during the war.

== Construction ==
L-3's keel was laid down on 18 April 1914, by the Fore River Shipbuilding Company, in Quincy, Massachusetts. She was launched on 15 March 1915, sponsored by Mrs. Lew Morton Atkins, and commissioned, at the Boston Navy Yard, on 22 April 1916.

== Service history ==
=== 1916 ===
L-3 was assigned to the Fifth Division, Submarine Flotilla, Atlantic Fleet, as of 22 April 1916, and initially operated off Massachusetts, and in the Block Island and Long Island sounds, conducting equipment tests, tactical maneuvering, and torpedo target practices to 22 June. Departing that day from New London, Connecticut, she arrived at the Philadelphia Navy Yard, on 24 June. Clearing the yard, a week later, on 1 July, she shifted to Cape May, New Jersey, before making her return to New London on July 6. In succeeding weeks, she conducted additional training off Newport, Rhode Island, until going to sea on 16 August. Transiting southward, she arrived at Lynnhaven Roads, Virginia, on 21 August, then made her return to New London, on 23 August. In early September, she operated again off Massachusetts, before entering the Boston Navy Yard, for overhaul from 6 September–27 October, then again conducted training in the waters off Rhode Island and Connecticut, into December. On 2 December, she cleared Newport, bound southward to conduct further tests and made visits to Annapolis, Maryland, Hampton Roads, Virginia, Key West, Florida, before arriving at Havana, Cuba, on 30 December, for holiday liberty.

=== 1917 ===
After spending the New Year's holidays at Havana, L-3 cleared the Cuban capital, on 2 January 1917, and arrived, later that day, at Key West. Remaining there until 22 January, she got underway bound for Pensacola, Florida, via the Dry Tortugas, and arriving at her destination on 28 January. She spent the succeeding weeks operating along the Gulf coast, from Pensacola and Mobile, Alabama, well into March.

During this time, the Atlantic Fleet was conducting its annual winter training in the waters off Cuba, when Imperial Germany's resumption of unrestricted submarine warfare on 1 February, resulted in increased tensions with the US. The fleet initially consolidated in Guacanayabo Bay, Cuba, then re-located to the sheltered waters of the lower Chesapeake Bay and the York River, in Virginia.

With the concentration of the fleet, L-3 departed Pensacola, on 27 March 1917, and transiting via Key West, and arrived at Hampton Roads, on 5 April. The day following her arrival, the US declared war on Germany and entered the Great War. The day of this declaration, L-3 shifted to the Norfolk Navy Yard, Portsmouth, Virginia. Upon clearing the yard on April 16, she moved up the York river, and joined the fleet at Yorktown, Virginia. The submarines of the flotilla operated in the Chesapeake Bay, conducting tactical exercises with a number of the fleet's surface assets in Tangier Sound, from 30 April–4 May. On 4 May, Bushnell, along with L-1, L-2, L-3, and L-4, departed from York Spit, Virginia, bound for the Philadelphia Navy Yard, and arrived the next day. On 6 May, L-3 and L-4 collided with Swallow, at the Philadelphia Navy Yard. Admiral Henry T. Mayo, Commander, Atlantic Fleet, issued letters of reprimand to the commanding officers of L-3 and L-4 for their improper handling of their boats and "carelessness in the performance of duty".

In June 1917, Vice Admiral William S. Sims, Commander, US Naval Forces in European Waters, in June 1917, cited British success in using submarines as submarine hunter-killers in antisubmarine warfare (ASW). The Allied submarines, with their lower profiles, could approach U-boats more stealthily than larger surface patrol vessels. On 2 July, Admiral William S. Benson, Chief of Naval Operations, ordered the twelve most suitable submarines on the Atlantic coast be fitted out for duty in European waters. L-3 underwent extensive overhaul into November, at Philadelphia, to prepare her for distant service.

L-3 got underway in company with L-1 and L-2, on 14 November. The submarines proceeded to Lewes, Delaware, to conduct surface and submerged drills and maneuvers and returned to the Philadelphia Navy Yard, that evening.

L-3, in company with her sister boats L-1, L-2, L-4, L-9, L-10, L-11, along with E-class submarine E-1, and the submarine tenders Bushnell, with Captain Thomas C. Hart, Commander, Submarine Flotilla embarked, and Fulton, cleared Philadelphia, on 18 November 1917, and proceeded to New London, Base No. 22, arriving on 22 November. From there, they departed on November 27, bound for European waters via Melville, Rhode Island.

Having charted a direct course to the Azores, Hart's force ran into a gale which scattered them and required them to pause and re-assemble at Bermuda, Base No. 24, on 13 December. After a period at Bermuda, L-3 departed, in company with Genesee, L-4, and E-1, on 31 December, bound for the Azores.

=== 1918 ===
The ships arrived at Ponta Delgada, Base No. 13, on 12 January 1918. She cleared the Portuguese archipelago on 22 January, bound for the British Isles, but was forced to return to Ponta Delgada, due to a battery leak. Upon completion of repairs, she again cleared Ponta Delgada, and finally arrived at the US submarine base at Castletownbere (Berehaven), Bantry Bay, Ireland, on 22 February.

Upon arrival in the war zone, in order to differentiate them from the British L-class submarines, the US boats were re-designated with the suffix "A" (American) and the letters and numerals identifying them were painted onto the fairwaters of the US boats.

The commander of the forward deployed US submarines was Captain Hart, on board Bushnell. Though under the nominal command of Vice Admiral Sims, Hart's US submarines in Ireland, came under Vice Admiral Sir Lewis Bayly, RN, Commander-in-Chief, Coast of Ireland, and his submarine commander, Captain Sir Martin E. Nasmith, later Dunbar-Nasmith, RN. Bayly initially ordered Hart to deploy only one of his submarines at a time at sea, and that Royal Navy officers were to always be informed of departures and returns. Their patrol area was also to be limited to seaward of the Fastnet Lighthouse, so as to keep clear of British patrols and to avoid potentially fatal friendly-fire incidents.

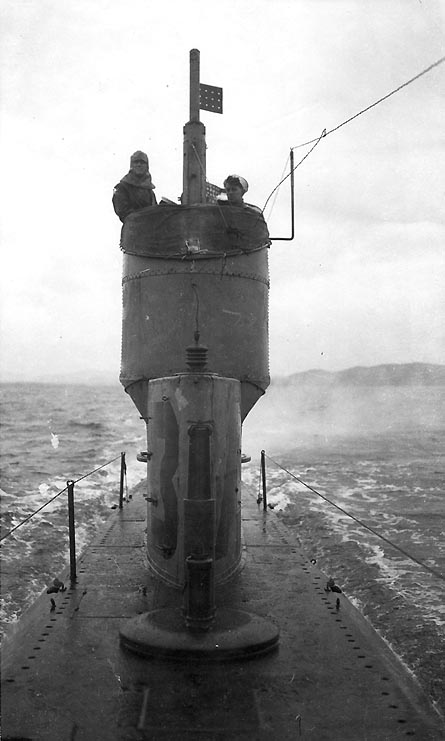
Fairview of USS L-3, off Berehaven, Ireland, in 1918

The submarines' initial base at Queenstown, proved unsatisfactory for Lieutenant Commander Harold M. Bemis' Division Five, as it was also serving as the headquarters for the surface patrol forces. As a result, the US submarines were relocated to Berehaven.

The division trained in Bantry Bay, conducting dives and tactical maneuvers under the charge of the commander of the Royal Navy's Submarine Flotilla, also based at Berehaven. US submarine officers also trained with a "submarine attack war game" apparatus on board the submarine depot ship HMS Vulcan.

The US submarines' patrols were to be based on eight-day rotations, there would be eight days on patrol and eight days in port for overhaul, re-provision, and rest in preparation for the next eight-day patrol.

With her training with the British completed, AL-3 began patrolling operations in early March 1918. While returning from patrol on 22 March, AL-3 was in a head sea. The rolling of the boat negatively affected the magnetic compass causing her to be late in returning to base. AL-3 arrived at Queenstown, Base No. 6, on 9 May, and entered the yard at Haulbowline, for refit. On 1 June, AL-3 was still at Haulbowline, engaged in overhaul and upkeep. Working parties from Melville and Dixie also conducted overhaul work on the boat.

Following her period in the yard, AL-3 cleared her base at Berehaven, on 6 June 1918, in thick weather and stood out to submerge to test her hull for leaks. Upon surfacing, she sighted a US destroyer bearing down on her at 2,500 yd (1.4 mi; 2.3 km). The submarine exchanged recognition signals and the destroyer passed ahead to the north. Shortly thereafter, a second destroyer, Jenkins which had struck a submerged object earlier which she believed to be a submarine, hove into sight and bore down on AL-3. The boat fired a smoke bomb as a recognition signal, but Jenkins fired on the submarine. AL-3 detonated three more smoke bombs, flashed a signal on the Aldis lamp, and had her colors flying. Despite these measures, the destroyer fired six shots at the submarine, all of which fell short. Later, she approached AL-3 to inquire if she was injured. Answering in the negative, AL-3 obtained permission to proceed and continued to westward.

AL-3 departed Berehaven, on 25 July; bound for Plymouth, England, she was to rendezvous with the US submarine chasers stationed there in order to conduct ASW training. She arrived the following day at the rendezvous point, five mi (8.0 km) south of Eddystone lighthouse, and was convoyed in to port. She conducted training based from Plymouth, into September. AL-3 departed Plymouth, on 2 September, and proceeded back to Ireland, she was escorted back in to Queenstown, on September 3. The next day she shifted to her base at Berehaven. AL-3 continued to conduct patrols based from Bantry Bay, into November.

=== 1919-1923 ===
With the Armistice of 11 November 1918, the submarine shifted to Portland, England, and remained there into the New Year. AL-3 departed Portland, on 3 January 1919, for the US. Transiting via the Azores and Bermuda, she arrived at the Philadelphia Navy Yard, on 1 February.

Within a week of her return she underwent inspection and a change of command. Afterward, she underwent post-deployment overhaul and refit, upon completion of which, she was re-assigned to the Submarine Base, Hampton Roads, where she arrived on 27 May 1919. Based from there, the submarine conducted training and undersea warfare experiments in the waters off the Virginia capes, and in the lower Chesapeake Bay into 1920. On 29 March 1920, L-3 was undergoing overhaul at Hampton Roads. On 17 July 1920, L-3 was re-designated SS-42 as part of a Navy-wide administrative re-organization. On 16 November, L-1 (SS-4), L-2 (SS-41), L-3, L-4 (SS-43), L-9 (SS-49), and M-1 (SS-47), were ordered to be prepared for transfer to the Submarine Repair Division, at the Philadelphia Navy Yard. The Office of the Chief of Naval Operations (OpNav), on 22 November, issued a memorandum stating that the above mentioned submarines were to be kept in an inactive status. The Submarine Repair Division was abolished on 26 March 1921, and L-3 was detached and assigned to Submarine Division 3, at the Philadelphia Navy Yard, in an inactive status. L-3 was placed in commission in ordinary on 1 June 1921, at Philadelphia, and then returned to full commission on 6 February 1922. Afterward, she was towed with L-11 (SS-51), via Cold Spring Inlet, New Jersey, and delivered to Commander, Submarine Base, New London, on 15 February. On 1 May, she was again placed in reduced commission.

After being stationed at New London, for fourteen months, OpNav issued orders on 16 January 1923, stating that L-2, L-3, L-9, and L-11, would be docked and decommissioned. On 29 January, she departed New London, and arrived the next day at the Portsmouth Navy Yard, Kittery, Maine, where she docked until 3 April. OpNav ordered, on 13 February, that L-3's engine and motor may be loaded on the towing vessel for transportation to the Submarine Base, Hampton Roads. Then on 5 March 1923, OpNav ordered that L-3 proceed to Hampton Roads, under the tow of the Lapwing-class minesweeper Chewink. The submarine returned to New London, on 5 April, and then two weeks later, departed New London, under tow and arrived at the Norfolk Navy Yard, on 21 April. L-3 was placed out of commission at Hampton Roads, on 11 June 1923. She was towed into the Philadelphia Navy Yard, and delivered to the charge of Commandant, Philadelphia Navy Yard, on 25 September 1924. Her home yard was later changed to the Norfolk Navy Yard, on 19 June 1928.

== Fate ==
L-3 was stricken from the Navy Register, on 18 December 1930. She was scrapped and her material sold on 28 November 1933, in accordance with the London Naval Treaty, for the limitation and reduction of naval armament.

== Bibliography ==
- "Table 21 - Ships on Navy List June 30, 1919". Congressional Serial Set. U.S. Government Printing Office: 767. 1921.
- Mohl, Michael. "L-3 (SS-42)". Navsource.net.
- Friedman, Norman (1995). U.S. Submarines Through 1945: An Illustrated Design History. Annapolis, Maryland: Naval Institute Press. ISBN 1-55750-263-3.
- Gardiner, Robert & Gray, Randal (1985). Conway's All the World's Fighting Ships 1906–1921. Annapolis, Maryland: Naval Institute Press. ISBN 0-85177-245-5.
- Havern, Christopher B. Sr (10 May 2021). "L-3 (Submarine No. 42)". Dictionary of American Naval Fighting Ships. Navy Department, Naval History and Heritage Command. This article incorporates text from this source, which is in the public domain.
