= USS L-1 =

L-class submarine of the United States Navy

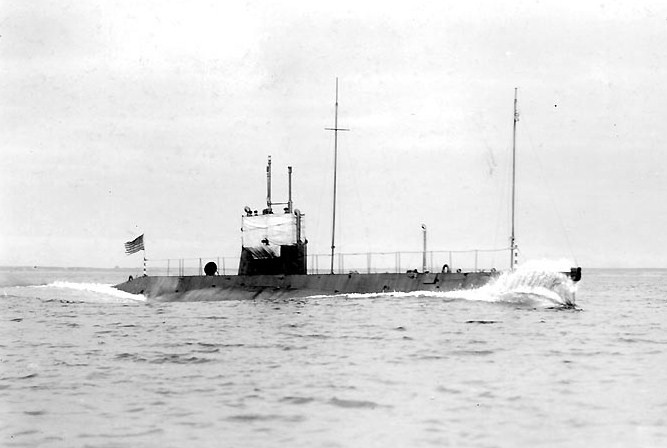
- USS L-1 running at 14 kn (26 km/h; 16 mph) during trials off Provincetown, Massachusetts, the original print bears a date of March 1915, this is probably an error, the actual date may be March 1916

History

United States
- Name: L-1
- Builder: Fore River Shipbuilding Company, Quincy, Massachusetts
- Cost: $617,752.50 (hull and machinery)
- Laid down: 13 April 1914
- Launched: 20 January 1915
- Commissioned: 11 April 1916
- Decommissioned: 7 April 1922
- Identification: Hull symbol: SS-40 (17 July 1920); Call sign: NYN
- Fate: Sold for scrapping, 31 July 1922

General characteristics
- Type: L-class submarine
- Displacement: 450 long tons (457 t) surfaced; 548 long tons (557 t) submerged
- Length: 167 ft 5 in (51.03 m)
- Beam: 17 ft 5 in (5.31 m)
- Draft: 13 ft 7 in (4.14 m)
- Installed power: 450 hp (340 kW) (diesel engines); 170 hp (130 kW) (electric motors)
- Propulsion: 2 × NELSECO diesel engines; 2 × Electro Dynamic electric motors; 2 × 60-cell batteries; 2 × Propellers
- Speed: 14 kn (26 km/h; 16 mph) surfaced; 10.5 kn (19.4 km/h; 12.1 mph) submerged
- Range: 3,150 nmi (5,830 km; 3,620 mi) at 11 kn (20 km/h; 13 mph) surfaced
- Test depth: 200 ft (61 m)
- Capacity: 18,977 US gal (71,840 L; 15,802 imp gal) fuel
- Complement: 2 officers; 26 enlisted
- Armament: 4 × 18 inch (450 mm) bow torpedo tubes (8 torpedoes); 1 × 3 in (76 mm)/23 caliber deck gun

USS L-1 (SS-40), also known as "Submarine No. 40", was an L-class submarine of the United States Navy. She and her sister boats worked on submarine tactics in the Gulf of Mexico, Caribbean, and East Coast, prior to sailing to the Azores, and later stationed in Ireland, during WWI.

== Design ==
The L-class boats designed by Electric Boat (L-1 to L-4 and L-9 to L-11) were built to slightly different specifications from the other L boats, which were designed by Lake Torpedo Boat, and are sometimes considered a separate class. The Electric Boat submarines had a length of 168 ft 6 in (51.4 m) overall, a beam of 17 ft 5 in (5.3 m) and a mean draft of 13 ft 7 in (4.1 m). They displaced 450 long tons (460 t) on the surface and 548 long tons (557 t) submerged. The L-class submarines had a crew of 28 officers and enlisted men. They had a diving depth of 200 feet (61.0 m).

For surface running, the Electric Boat submarines were powered by two 450-brake-horsepower (336 kW) diesel engines, each driving one propeller shaft. When submerged each propeller was driven by a 170-horsepower (127 kW) electric motor. They could reach 14 kn (26 km/h; 16 mph) on the surface and 10.5 kn (19.4 km/h; 12.1 mph) underwater. On the surface, the boats had a range of 5,150 nmi (9,540 km; 5,930 mi) at 11 kn (20 km/h; 13 mph) and 150 nmi (280 km; 170 mi) at 5 kn (9.3 km/h; 5.8 mph) submerged.

The boats were armed with four 18-inch (450 mm) torpedo tubes in the bow. They carried four reloads, for a total of eight torpedoes. The Electric Boat submarines were initially not fitted with a deck gun; a single 3 in (76 mm)/23 caliber on a disappearing mount was added during the war.

== Construction ==
L-1's keel was laid down on 13 April 1914, by the Fore River Shipbuilding Company, in Quincy, Massachusetts. She was launched on 20 January 1915, sponsored by Mrs. Freeland A. Daubin, and commissioned on 11 April 1916.

== Service history ==
=== 1916 ===
L-1 received orders on 5 May 1916, assigning her to Commander, Division Five, Submarine Flotilla, Atlantic Fleet. The submarine conducted her shakedown in the waters off New England, from 29 April-22 June 1916, and afterward proceeded to the Philadelphia Navy Yard, where she arrived on 24 June. She departed on 1 July, and arrived that same day at Cape May, New Jersey, for exhibition purposes. She cleared on 5 July, and trained underway in Long Island and Block Island sounds, from 6 July-20 August, conducting tactical maneuvers and torpedo exercises with Bushnell. She then proceeded to Lynnhaven Roads, Virginia, in the Chesapeake Bay, as part of her strategic maneuvers, from 21-24 August, in company with Bushnell. She then conducted her first preliminary torpedo practice at Napeague Bay, New York, before moving on to the Boston Navy Yard, where she engaged in maneuvers and underwent repairs and overhaul from 4 September-1 October. Through the remainder of 1916, she ranged the Atlantic, from New England to Florida, developing and testing the tactics and techniques. She cleared Key West, on 23 December, and sailed for the Caribbean.

=== 1917 ===
L-1 conducted annual fleet tactical training, and gunnery/torpedo exercises, in the waters off Cuba, early in 1917. With Imperial Germany's resumption of unrestricted submarine warfare on 1 February, the fleet consolidated initially at Guacanayabo Bay, and by 31 March, had re-located to the sheltered waters of the lower Chesapeake Bay. When the US declared war on Germany and entered the World War I, on 6 April 1917, L-1 was still with the fleet. L-1 departed York Spit, Virginia, on 4 May; bound for the Philadelphia Navy Yard, she proceeded in company with Bushnell, and her sister boats L-2, L-3, and L-4. All arrived without incident.

In June 1917, Vice Admiral William S. Sims, Commander, US Naval Forces in European Waters, in June 1917, cited British success in using submarines as submarine hunter-killers in antisubmarine warfare (ASW). The Allied submarines, with their lower profiles, could approach U-boats more stealthily than larger surface patrol vessels. On 2 July, Admiral William S. Benson, Chief of Naval Operations, ordered the twelve most suitable submarines on the Atlantic coast be fitted out for duty in European waters. L-1 underwent extensive overhaul at Philadelphia, to prepare her for distant service. On 14 November, the boat departed Philadelphia, and conducted submerged and surface maneuvers off Lewes, Delaware, and returned that night.

L-1, in company L-2, L-3, L-4, L-9, L-10, L-11, E-class submarine E-1, and submarine tenders Bushnell, with Captain Thomas C. Hart, Commander, Submarine Flotilla embarked, and Fulton, cleared Philadelphia, on 18 November 1917, and proceeded to New London, Connecticut, Base No. 22, arriving on 22 November. From there, they departed on November 27, bound for European waters via Melville, Rhode Island. Having charted a direct course to the Azores, Hart's force ran into a gale which scattered them and required them to pause and re-assemble at Bermuda, Base No. 24, on 13 December. L-1 reached Ponta Delgada, Azores, Base No. 13, on 18 December. After her arrival, she underwent repairs and overhaul into January 1918.

=== 1918 ===
L-1 then departed, in tow of Bushnell, on 18 January, bound for Queenstown, now known as Cobh, Base No. 6, Ireland. On 21 January, she lost tow and proceeded under her own power until re-establishing tow on January 23. She continued until 27 January, when she cast off the tow and proceeded in to Queenstown, under her own power, escorted by US destroyers. She anchored that evening and then went alongside Bushnell, the next day.

Though under the nominal command of Vice Admiral Sims, Hart's US submarines in Ireland, came under Vice Admiral Sir Lewis Bayly, RN, Commander-in-Chief, Coast of Ireland, and his submarine commander, Captain Sir Martin E. Nasmith, later Dunbar-Nasmith, RN. Bayly initially ordered Hart to deploy only one of his submarines at a time at sea, and that Royal Navy officers were to always be informed of departures and returns. Their patrol area was also to be limited to seaward of the Fastnet Lighthouse, so as to keep clear of British patrols and to avoid potentially fatal friendly-fire incidents. The base at Queenstown, proved unsatisfactory for Lieutenant Commander Harold M. Bemis' Division Five, as it was also serving as the headquarters for the surface patrol forces. As a result, the US submarines were relocated to a base at Castletownbere (Berehaven), Bantry Bay.

On 5 February, L-1 parted company with Bushnell and stood out of Queenstown, enroute to Bantry Bay. She arrived at Berehaven, later that night. In the ensuing days, from 6-16 February, the division trained in Bantry Bay, conducting dives and tactical maneuvers under the charge of the commander of the Royal Navy's Submarine Flotilla also based at Berehaven. US submarine officers also trained with a “submarine attack war game” apparatus on board HMS Vulcan. In order to denote them from the British L-class submarine, the US submarines were re-designated with the suffix "A" (American) and the letter was painted onto the fairwaters of the US boats. After division training, AL-1 underwent overhaul, from 24 February-24 March, then made additional repairs, including the installation of a new periscope, at Haulbowline, in Queenstown, through April. Afterward, she sailed for Berehaven, on 11 May.

While on patrol on 21-22 May 1918, near the Scilly Islands, AL-1 reported contacting a German U-boat. Having been able to observe the entire stretch of the submarine's deck and guns, she reported that the U-boat was of the Type U-93 class. AL-1 reported firing two torpedoes, one at the German bow and one at the conning tower. Delays in the torpedo room, prevented other shots being fired. The German submarine took evasive action and returned fire with her stern gun. The German fire proved ineffective though, as the US submarine was submerged, the latter could not spot the fall of the German rounds through the periscope. In the end, the submarines broke contact and the action produced no result. AL-1 resumed her routine patrol. Just over two weeks later, on 6 June, AL-1 was cruising in the vicinity of Small's Light, Ireland, when she encountered O'Brien. The latter fired two shots from her bow gun which missed. In response, the submarine deployed a smoke grenade as a visual signal. With the destroyer's like signal in response, AL-1 submerged and maneuvered so as to avoid any further contact with US destroyers that may have generated friendly-fire. Having returned from a patrol on 26 June, AL-1 reported sighting a U-boat south of Daunt Rock, Ireland, but could not attack. Just over a month later, on 27 July, the submarine was enroute to Berehaven, when she sighted a U-boat. Having spotted the US submarine, the German dived at once. AL-1 kept a close lookout and had an initial oscillator sound contact, that was lost and then she proceeded toward Berehaven, on the surface, reaching the next day. On 24 August AL-1 conducted ASW training exercises with US submarine chasers.

Just prior to the Armistice of 11 November 1918, L-1 shifted to Portland, England, as an operational base. She continued to operate from there through the Christmas and New Year's holidays.

=== 1919-1921 ===
L-1 departed Portland, on 3 January 1919, on a westerly course bound for a return to the US. She reached the Philadelphia Navy Yard, on 1 February. Afterward, she docked and underwent an extensive post-deployment overhaul.

L-1 transferred to the Submarine Base, at Hampton Roads, Virginia, in late May 1919. Operating in the Chesapeake Bay, and the waters off the Virginia capes, the submarine conducted a port visit to Baltimore, Maryland, in September 1919. While conducting training with L-2 on 22 September, L-1 was almost struck by Thomas, while submerged because L-2 failed to follow appropriate procedures indicating that submarines were operating submerged in the area. The following month, on 30 October, L-1 did collide with the steamer SS Northland in the waters around Hampton Roads. A board of investigation was convened on 1 November, and values of damage assessed. L-1 had another collision incident on 1 February 1921, when she was rammed by the pilot boat Philadelphia. The pilot boat towed the submarine into the Delaware Breakwater Harbor. The fleet tug Kalmia responded and took L-1 under tow.

== Fate ==
L-1 arrived at the Philadelphia Navy Yard, on 7 February 1921, and decommissioned there on 7 April 1922. She was sold as a hulk on 31 July 1922, to Pottstown Steel Company, Douglassville, Pennsylvania, for scrapping. She was removed from the Philadelphia Navy Yard, and delivered to the purchaser, on 6 September 1922. She was later broken up.

== Bibliography ==
- "Table 21 - Ships on Navy List June 30, 1919". Congressional Serial Set. U.S. Government Printing Office: 767. 1921.
- Mohl, Michael. "L-1 (SS-40)". Navsource.net.
- Friedman, Norman (1995). U.S. Submarines Through 1945: An Illustrated Design History. Annapolis, Maryland: Naval Institute Press. ISBN 1-55750-263-3.
- Gardiner, Robert & Gray, Randal (1985). Conway's All the World's Fighting Ships 1906–1921. Annapolis, Maryland: Naval Institute Press. ISBN 0-85177-245-5.
- Havern, Christopher B. Sr (22 May 2018). "L-1 (Submarine No. 40)". Dictionary of American Naval Fighting Ships. Navy Department, Naval History and Heritage Command. This article incorporates text from this source, which is in the public domain.
