= USS L-11 =

L-class submarine of the United States

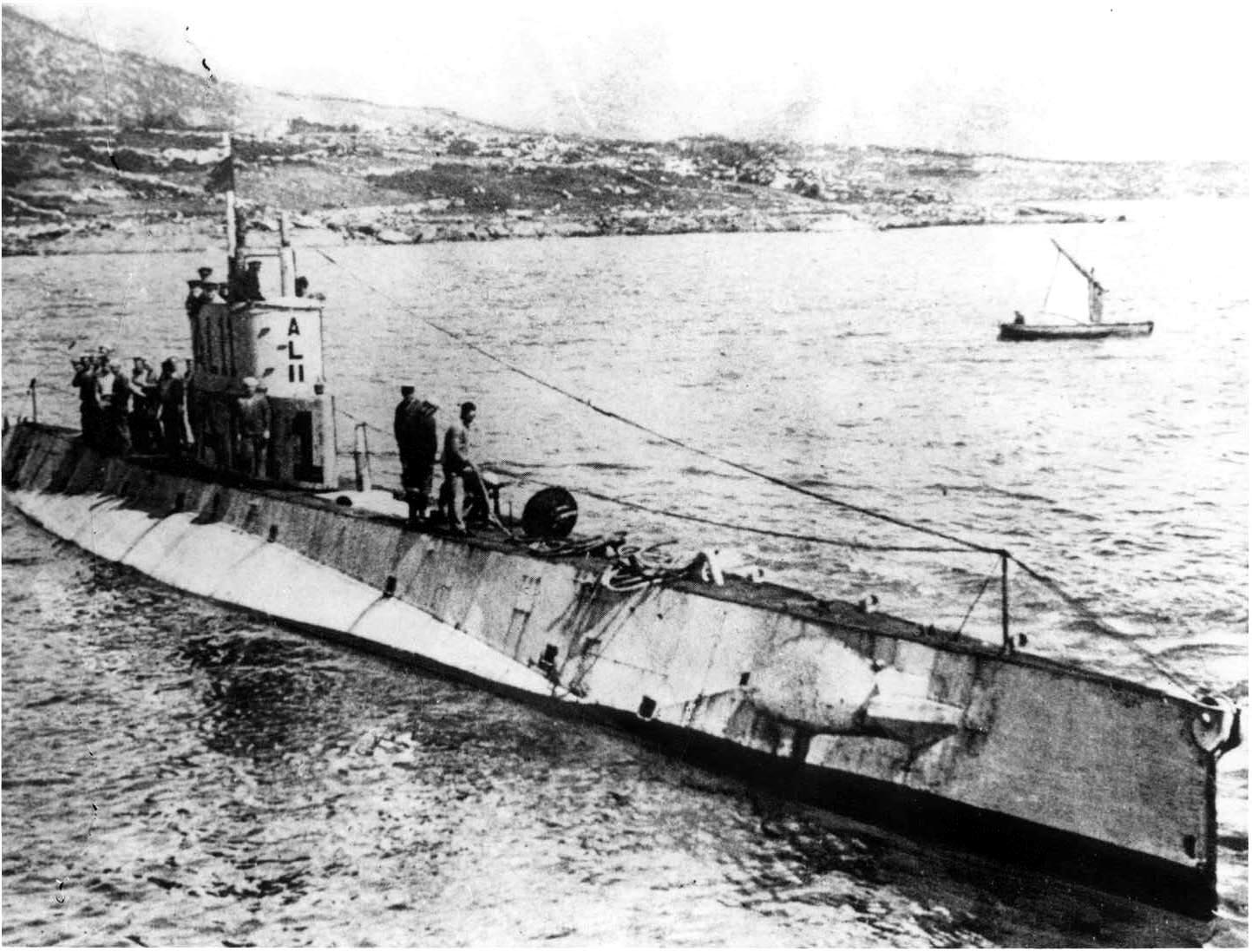
- USS L-11 in Bantry Bay, Ireland, during World War I. "A" (for "American") has been added to her markings to distinguish her from the British submarine HMS L11.

History

United States
- Name: L-11
- Builder: Fore River Shipbuilding Company, Quincy, Massachusetts
- Cost: $573,454.45 (hull and machinery)
- Laid down: 17 February 1915
- Launched: 16 May 1916
- Sponsored by: Miss Mary Richards Latimer
- Commissioned: 15 August 1916
- Decommissioned: 28 November 1923
- Stricken: 18 December 1930
- Identification: Hull symbol: SS-51 (17 July 1920); Call sign: NYX
- Fate: Sold for scrapping, 28 November 1933

General characteristics
- Type: L-class submarine
- Displacement: 450 long tons (457 t) surfaced; 548 long tons (557 t) submerged
- Length: 167 ft 5 in (51.03 m)
- Beam: 17 ft 5 in (5.31 m)
- Draft: 13 ft 7 in (4.14 m)
- Installed power: 450 hp (340 kW) (diesel engines); 170 hp (130 kW) (electric motors)
- Propulsion: 2 × NELSECO diesel engines; 2 × Electro Dynamic electric motors; 2 × 60-cell batteries; 2 × Propellers
- Speed: 14 kn (26 km/h; 16 mph) surfaced; 10.5 kn (19.4 km/h; 12.1 mph) submerged
- Range: 3,300 nmi (6,100 km; 3,800 mi) at 11 kn (20 km/h; 13 mph) surfaced; 150 nmi (280 km; 170 mi) at 5 kn (9.3 km/h; 5.8 mph) submerged
- Test depth: 200 ft (61 m)
- Capacity: 18,977 US gal (71,840 L; 15,802 imp gal) fuel
- Complement: 2 officers; 26 enlisted
- Armament: 4 × 18 inch (450 mm) bow torpedo tubes (8 torpedoes); 1 × 3 in (76 mm)/23 caliber deck gun

USS L-11 (SS-51), also known as "Submarine No. 51", was an L-class submarine of the United States Navy. She and her sister boats worked on submarine tactics in the Gulf of Mexico, Caribbean, and East Coast, prior to sailing to the Azores, and were later stationed in Ireland, during WWI.

== Design ==
The L-class boats designed by Electric Boat (L-1 to L-4 and L-9 to L-11) were built to slightly different specifications from the other L boats, which were designed by Lake Torpedo Boat, and are sometimes considered a separate class. The Electric Boat submarines had a length of 168 ft 6 in (51.4 m) overall, a beam of 17 ft 5 in (5.3 m) and a mean draft of 13 ft 7 in (4.1 m). They displaced 450 long tons (460 t) on the surface and 548 long tons (557 t) submerged. The L-class submarines had a crew of 28 officers and enlisted men. They had a diving depth of 200 ft (61.0 m).

For surface running, the Electric Boat submarines were powered by two 450-brake-horsepower (336 kW) diesel engines, each driving one propeller shaft. When submerged each propeller was driven by a 170-horsepower (127 kW) electric motor. They could reach 14 kn (26 km/h; 16 mph) on the surface and 10.5 kn (19.4 km/h; 12.1 mph) underwater. On the surface, the boats had a range of 5,150 nmi (9,540 km; 5,930 mi) at 11 kn (20 km/h; 13 mph) and 150 nmi (280 km; 170 mi) at 5 kn (9.3 km/h; 5.8 mph) submerged.

The boats were armed with four 18-inch (450 mm) torpedo tubes in the bow. They carried four reloads, for a total of eight torpedoes. The Electric Boat submarines were initially not fitted with a deck gun; a single 3 in (76 mm)/23 caliber on a disappearing mount was added during the war.

== Construction ==
L-10's keel was laid down on 17 February 1915, by the Fore River Shipbuilding Company, of Quincy, Massachusetts. She was launched on 16 May 1916, sponsored by Miss Mary Richards Latimer, and commissioned at the Boston Navy Yard, on 15 August 1916.

== Service history ==
=== 1916 ===
L-11, upon her commissioning, was assigned to Division Six, Submarine Flotilla, Atlantic Fleet. She cleared the Boston Navy Yard, for trials and maneuvers, on 19 August 1916, and made her return on 27 August. Getting underway again on 9 September, she proceeded to Newport, Rhode Island, until 18 October. After this time in the waters of New England, she transited southward, stopping along the Atlantic seaboard, at Tompkinsville, New York; Hampton Roads, Virginia; Rappahannock Spit, Virginia; and the Norfolk Navy Yard, Portsmouth, Virginia, before returning to the Boston Navy Yard, on 30 October. She remained there until 23 December, when she again got underway for a visit to southern waters. She arrived at Charleston, South Carolina, on 28 December, and Jacksonville, Florida, on 31 December, enroute to Key West, where she reached on 4 January.

=== 1917 ===
Departing Key West, on 22 January, she continued on to Dry Tortugas, Florida, until 26 January, enroute to Pensacola, Florida, to conduct training from 28 January–20 February. She then made a run to Key West, before returning to Pensacola, for additional training exercises on 26 February.

During the time the submarine conducted training, relations between the US and Imperial Germany, had become strained by the latter's resumption of unrestricted submarine warfare on 1 February 1917. As the result of these heightened tensions, L-11 was ordered to proceed to Hampton Roads. Departing Pensacola on 27 March, she transited via Key West, and stood in through the Virginia capes to Hampton Roads, on 5 April. The following day, the same day the US declared war on Germany, the submarine shifted to the Norfolk Navy Yard. Underway again, she departed Hampton Roads, on 9 April, and after touching at the Ambrose Channel, on 11 April, stood in to Submarine Base, Base No. 22, at New London, Connecticut, on 12 April. Here, at Base No. 22, her crew received instruction and underwent training. L-11 , with her fellow division units, L-9 and L-10, received orders on 30 April, directing them to re-locate to Boston Navy Yard, for scheduled maintenance. They were to convoy with the ex-monitor, now submarine tender, Tonopah. Departing on 6 May, the submarines transited the Cape Cod Canal, and stood in to Boston, and docked at the Navy Yard for overhaul, on 8 May. That yard work continued in to October.

In June 1917, Vice Admiral William S. Sims, Commander, US Naval Forces in European Waters cited British success in using submarines as submarine hunter-killers in antisubmarine warfare (ASW). The Allied submarines, with their lower profiles, could approach U-boats more stealthily than larger surface patrol vessels. On 2 July, Admiral William S. Benson, Chief of Naval Operations, ordered the twelve most suitable submarines on the Atlantic coast be fitted out for duty in European waters.

The Sixth Division received orders, on 28 October 1917, to proceed via the Cape Cod Canal, to Newport, to conduct training in preparation for distant service. On 3 November, L-11 received orders transferring her to Submarine Division Five. In the first weeks of November, the submarine conducted training at submerged stations and torpedo firing in the waters around Newport, and the Torpedo Station, at Melville, Rhode Island.

In company with her sister boats L-1, L-2, L-3, L-4, L-9, L-10, E-class submarine E-1, along with the submarine tenders Bushnell, with Captain Thomas C. Hart, Commander, Submarine Flotilla embarked, and Fulton, L-11 cleared Narragansett Bay, in tow of Bushnell, on 4 December.

Having charted a direct course to the Azores, Hart's force ran into a gale. L-11 parted lines with Bushnell, in heavy weather, on 7 December 1917. She then proceeded under her own power, alternating engines to conserve fuel, on a direct course for the Azores. She arrived at Flores Island, Azores, on 20 December. She then departed, on 22 December, escorted by Wheeling and stood in to Ponta Delgada, Base No. 13, on 23 December, and went alongside L-10, at the breakwater.

During the submarine's crossing to the Azores, on 19 December, the Admiralty suggested that in order to differentiate the US boats from the British L-class submarines, that they be re-designated with the suffix "A" (American) and the letters and numerals identifying them be painted onto their fairwaters. Headquarters, US Naval Forces Operating in European Waters, at Grosvenor, London, England, issued an official statement about this change on 22 December.

=== 1918 ===
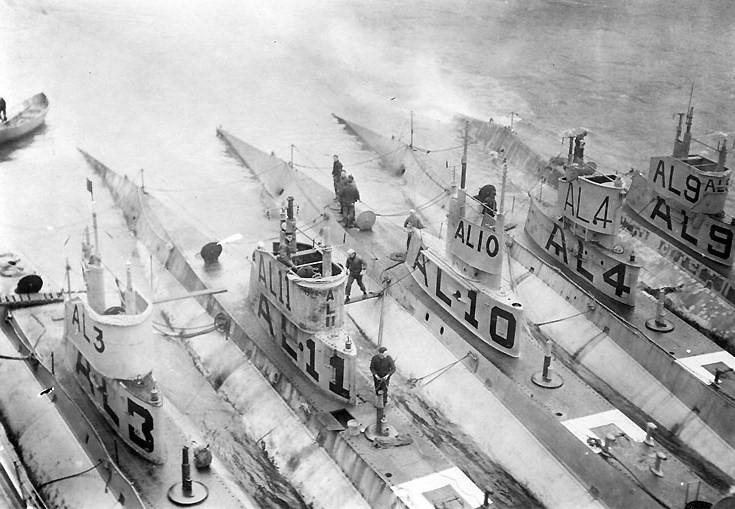
L-class submarines

Following a period of repair, L-11 got underway to conduct a patrol of the Azores, from 3–6 January 1918, to deny German U-boats or surface raiders use of the archipelago as a refuge. At the conclusion of the mission, the boat returned to Base No. 13, and secured alongside Bushnell.

On 22 January, Bushnell, Genesee, and submarines L-1, L-2, L-4, and L-11, stood out from Ponta Delgada, bound for Queenstown, now known as Cobh, Base No. 6, Ireland. They arrived on 27 January, and secured in the harbor.

Though under the nominal command of Vice Admiral Sims, Hart's US submarines in Ireland, came under Vice Admiral Sir Lewis Bayly, RN, Commander-in-Chief, Coast of Ireland, and his submarine commander, Captain Sir Martin E. Nasmith, later Dunbar-Nasmith, RN. Bayly initially ordered Hart to deploy only one of his submarines at a time at sea, and that Royal Navy officers were to always be informed of departures and returns. Their patrol area was also to be limited to seaward of the Fastnet Lighthouse, so as to keep clear of British patrols and to avoid potentially fatal friendly-fire incidents.

The base at Queenstown, proved unsatisfactory for Lieutenant Commander Harold M. Bemis' Division Five, as it was also serving as the headquarters for the surface patrol forces. As a result, the US submarines were relocated to a base at Berehaven, on 5 February.

In the ensuing days, 6–16 February, the division trained in Bantry Bay, conducting dives and tactical maneuvers under the charge of the commander of the Royal Navy's Submarine Flotilla also based at Berehaven. US submarine officers also trained with a "submarine attack war game" apparatus on board the submarine depot ship HMS Vulcan.

The US submarines' patrols were to be based on eight-day rotations, there would be eight days on patrol and eight days in port for overhaul, re-provision, and rest in preparation for the next eight-day patrol.

AL-11 fell in with this rotation and conducted her patrols in accordance with the schedule. She arrived at Queenstown, on 15 April, and moored alongside Melville, at the Haulbowline Shipyard, for maintenance. The submarine returned to Berehaven, at the completion of her yard work, and stood out to conduct a patrol on 25 April. She made an attack with two torpedoes on a suspected U-boat with negative results on 11 May. After another patrol, the boat arrived at Queenstown, for refit, on 2 June. With the work completed, AL-11 stood out from Queenstown, on 24 July, bound for Berehaven, they reached later that day. She was underway again on patrol four days later. AL-11 reported sighting an enemy submarine at 18:15, on 29 September 1918, but did not fire upon the boat. AL-11 continued her ASW patrolling duties to the war's end with the Armistice of 11 November 1918.

=== 1919-1923 ===
After the Armistice, AL-11 shifted from Berehaven, and operated from Portland, England, until 3 January 1919, when she cleared the British port for a return to the United States. Transiting westward, via the Azores and Bermuda, she stood in to the Philadelphia Navy Yard, on 1 February.

L-11 operated off the East Coast, developing submarine warfare tactics for the active remainder of her career. During this period, on 17 July 1920, she was designated SS-51 as part of a Navy-wide administrative re-organization. Shortly, afterward she entered the dry dock, at the Norfolk Navy Yard, on 27 July, for urgent repairs.

After clearing the yard, L-11 proceeded up the James River, on 14 September and visited Richmond, Virginia, as part of a Navy recruiting drive. Afterward, she transiting back down the river into the Chesapeake Bay. She then proceeded north to conduct a similar recruiting visit at Baltimore, Maryland, from 28 September–7 October. L-11 went to sea, bound for Bermuda, on 16 October, but was forced to return to Submarine Base, Hampton Roads, due to engine trouble. She then departed with E-1, on 22 October, to make a recruiting visit to Annapolis, Maryland, via Baltimore.

On 16 November 1920, the Office of Naval Operations issued orders directing that L-11 be prepared for transfer to the Submarine Repair Division, at the Philadelphia Navy Yard. She arrived at the Philadelphia Navy Yard, on 27 January 1921, and placed in an inactive status. On 26 March, Repair Division was abolished and L-11 was reassigned to Submarine Division Three. She was then placed "in ordinary", on 1 June. Just over eight months later, on 10 February 1922, her status changed from "in ordinary" to "full commission". She then got underway, in tow of Arapaho, on 17 February, transferred to the tow of Kalmia, she arrived the following day at the Submarine Base, at New London. On 9 May 1922, L-11 was re-assigned to Submarine Division Two. Having departed from New London, L-11 stood in to the Portsmouth Navy Yard, Kittery, Maine, on 2 February 1923. Remaining there until 30 March, she sortied and returned to New London, on 31 March. L-11 cleared New London, on 20 August, and proceeding south, she arrived at the Submarine Base, Hampton Roads, on 22 August.

== Fate ==
L-11 decommissioned at Hampton Roads, on 28 November 1923. She was later towed in to the Philadelphia Navy Yard, on 23 September 1924. She remained there through her being stricken from the Navy Register, on 18 December 1930, and subsequently being sold for scrap, on 28 November 1933.

== Bibliography ==
- "Table 21 - Ships on Navy List June 30, 1919". Congressional Serial Set. U.S. Government Printing Office: 767. 1921.
- Mohl, Michael. "L-11 (SS-51)". Navsource.net.
- Friedman, Norman (1995). U.S. Submarines Through 1945: An Illustrated Design History. Annapolis, Maryland: Naval Institute Press. ISBN 1-55750-263-3.
- Gardiner, Robert & Gray, Randal (1985). Conway's All the World's Fighting Ships 1906–1921. Annapolis, Maryland: Naval Institute Press. ISBN 0-85177-245-5.
- Havern, Christopher B. Sr. (10 May 2021). "L-11 (Submarine No. 51)". Dictionary of American Naval Fighting Ships. Navy Department, Naval History and Heritage Command. This article incorporates text from this source, which is in the public domain.
