= USS L-10 =

L-class submarine of the United States

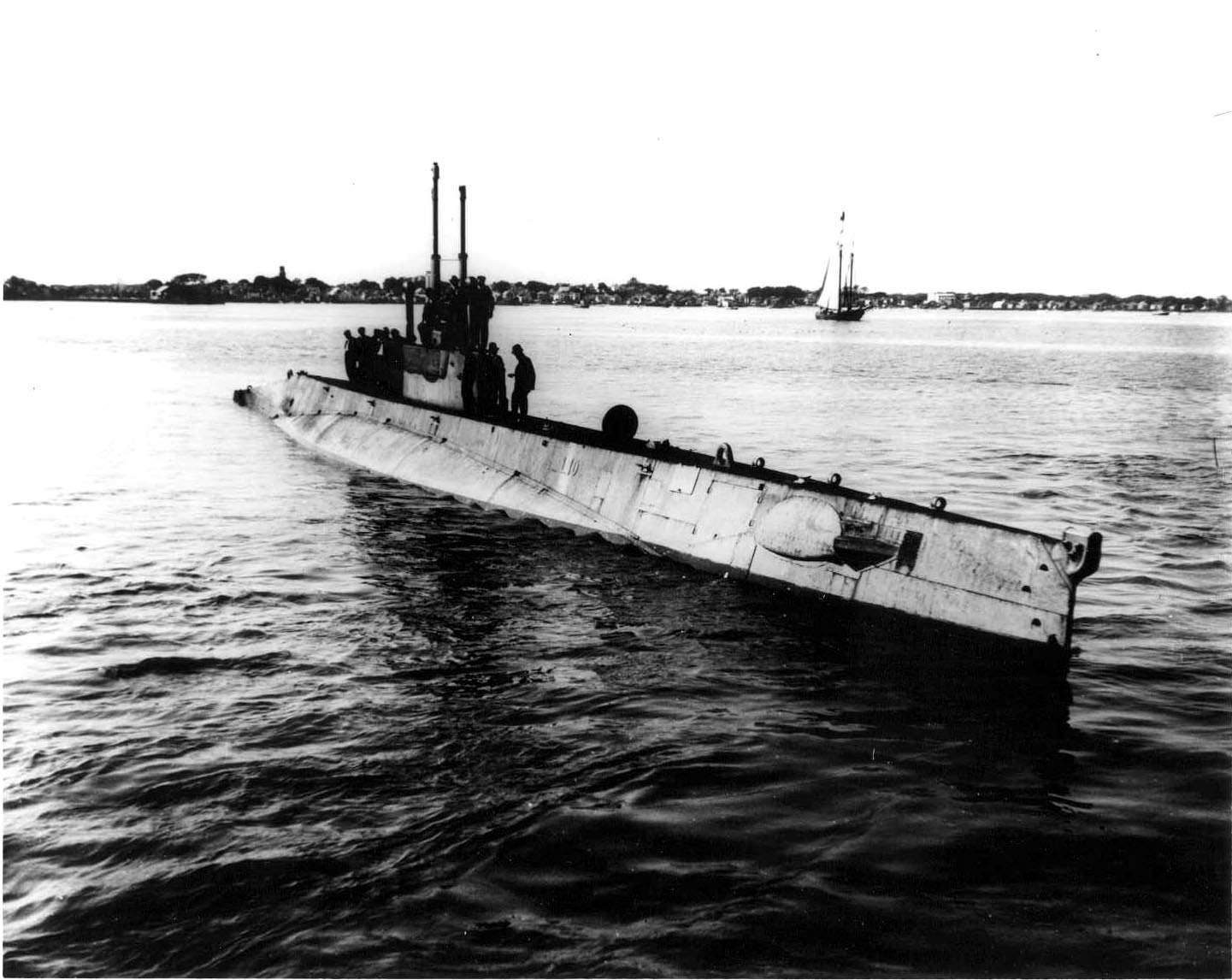
- USS L-10 at rest off Provincetown, Massachusetts, on 7 June 1916

History

United States
- Name: L-10
- Builder: Fore River Shipbuilding Company, Quincy, Massachusetts
- Cost: $591,079.72 (hull and machinery)
- Laid down: 17 February 1915
- Launched: 16 March 1916
- Sponsored by: Miss Catherine Rush
- Commissioned: 2 August 1916
- Decommissioned: 5 May 1922
- Identification: Hull symbol: SS-49 (17 July 1920); Call sign: NYW
- Fate: Sold for scrapping, 31 July 1922

General characteristics
- Type: L-class submarine
- Displacement: 450 long tons (457 t) surfaced; 548 long tons (557 t) submerged
- Length: 167 ft 5 in (51.03 m)
- Beam: 17 ft 5 in (5.31 m)
- Draft: 13 ft 7 in (4.14 m)
- Installed power: 450 hp (340 kW) (diesel engines); 170 hp (130 kW) (electric motors)
- Propulsion: 2 × NELSECO diesel engines; 2 × Electro Dynamic electric motors; 2 × 60-cell batteries; 2 × Propellers
- Speed: 14 kn (26 km/h; 16 mph) surfaced; 10.5 kn (19.4 km/h; 12.1 mph) submerged
- Range: 3,300 nmi (6,100 km; 3,800 mi) at 11 kn (20 km/h; 13 mph) surfaced; 150 nmi (280 km; 170 mi) at 5 kn (9.3 km/h; 5.8 mph) submerged
- Test depth: 200 ft (61 m)
- Capacity: 18,977 US gal (71,840 L; 15,802 imp gal) fuel
- Complement: 2 officers; 26 enlisted
- Armament: 4 × 18 inch (450 mm) bow torpedo tubes (8 torpedoes); 1 × 3 in (76 mm)/23 caliber deck gun

USS L-10 (SS-50), also known as "Submarine No. 50", was an L-class submarine of the United States Navy. She and her sister boats worked on submarine tactics in the Gulf of Mexico, Caribbean, and East Coast, prior to sailing to the Azores, and later stationed in Ireland, during WWI.

== Design ==
The L-class boats designed by Electric Boat (L-1 to L-4 and L-9 to L-11) were built to slightly different specifications from the other L boats, which were designed by Lake Torpedo Boat, and are sometimes considered a separate class. The Electric Boat submarines had a length of 168 ft 6 in (51.4 m) overall, a beam of 17 ft 5 in (5.3 m) and a mean draft of 13 ft 7 in (4.1 m). They displaced 450 long tons (460 t) on the surface and 548 long tons (557 t) submerged. The L-class submarines had a crew of 28 officers and enlisted men. They had a diving depth of 200 ft (61.0 m).

For surface running, the Electric Boat submarines were powered by two 450-brake-horsepower (336 kW) diesel engines, each driving one propeller shaft. When submerged each propeller was driven by a 170-horsepower (127 kW) electric motor. They could reach 14 kn (26 km/h; 16 mph) on the surface and 10.5 kn (19.4 km/h; 12.1 mph) underwater. On the surface, the boats had a range of 5,150 nmi (9,540 km; 5,930 mi) at 11 kn (20 km/h; 13 mph) and 150 nmi (280 km; 170 mi) at 5 kn (9.3 km/h; 5.8 mph) submerged.

The boats were armed with four 18-inch (450 mm) torpedo tubes in the bow. They carried four reloads, for a total of eight torpedoes. The Electric Boat submarines were initially not fitted with a deck gun; a single 3 in (76 mm)/23 caliber on a disappearing mount was added during the war.

== Construction ==
L-10's keel was laid down on 17 February 1915, by the Fore River Shipbuilding Company, of Quincy, Massachusetts. She was launched on 16 March 1916, sponsored by Miss Catherine Rush, and commissioned at the Boston Navy Yard, on 2 August 1916.

== Service history ==
=== 1916 ===
L-10, with the division's organization on 5 August 1916, was assigned to Division Six, Submarine Force, Atlantic Fleet. The submarine got underway on 12 August, clearing Boston, for Provincetown, Massachusetts, and returning that same day. She cleared Boston, a week later, on 19 August, and conducted maneuvers and training until her return on August 27. Standing out from Boston, on 9 September, L-10 proceeded southward with port visits at Newport, Rhode Island; Tompkinsville, New York; and Hampton Roads, Rappahannock Spit, and Norfolk, Virginia, before returning to the Boston Navy Yard, on 30 October.

Having remained there for almost two months, L-10 cleared Boston, on 23 December, bound for Key West, Florida. En route, she visited Charleston, South Carolina, and arrived at Jacksonville, Florida, on 31 December.

=== 1917 ===
Having spent New Year's Day, 1917, in port, L-10 sailed the next day, 2 January, reaching Key West, on 4 January. She remained there until 22 January, when she proceeded to the Dry Tortugas, en route to Pensacola, Florida. She remained in the waters off Pensacola, conducting torpedo practice and maneuvers, to 27 March. L-10 was ordered to return to the East Coast as a result of increased tensions with Imperial Germany, stemming from its resumption of unrestricted submarine warfare, on 1 February.

Proceeding via Key West, the boat stood in to the Norfolk Navy Yard, Portsmouth, Virginia, on 6 April, the same day the US declared war on Germany. Three days later, L-10 shifted to the Submarine Base, at Hampton Roads. L-10 departed Hampton Roads, on 9 April, and after touching at Ambrose Channel, on 11 April, stood in to Submarine Base, Base No. 22, at New London, Connecticut, on April 12. Here at Base No. 22, her crew received instruction and underwent further training. L-10 with her division-mates L-9 and L-11, received orders on 30 April, directing them to proceed to the Boston Navy Yard, for scheduled maintenance. They were to sail in convoy with Tonopah, which was to serve as tender. Departing on 6 May, the submarines transited the Cape Cod Canal and reached the Boston Navy Yard, on 8 May.

In June 1917, Vice Admiral William S. Sims, Commander, US Naval Forces in European Waters, in June 1917, cited British success in using submarines as submarine hunter-killers in antisubmarine warfare (ASW). The Allied submarines, with their lower profiles, could approach U-boats more stealthily than larger surface patrol vessels. On 2 July, Admiral William S. Benson, Chief of Naval Operations, ordered the twelve most suitable submarines on the Atlantic coast be fitted out for duty in European waters.

Having undocked, L-10 was standing in to Boston Harbor, off Spectacle Island, when she was rammed, on 11 August, by the Nantasket Company's vessel Mayflower. The collision damaged L-10 and she was ordered to Fore River for repairs. The incident prompted a hearing by the Steamboat Inspection Service and a further investigation by the Navy. While the former found Mayflower at fault, the latter faulted both vessels because both were proceeding at too great a speed given the conditions. Furthermore, Mayflower did not stop upon hearing L-10's whistle, while the submarine was on the wrong side of the channel for entering port, circumstances that made an incident unavoidable. After her repairs, L-10 left dry dock on 16 October.

The Sixth Division received orders on 28 October 1917, to proceed via the Cape Cod Canal, to Newport, to conduct training in preparation for distant service. In the first weeks of November, L-10 conducted exercises submerged, and carried out torpedo firing, in the waters around Newport, and the Torpedo Station, at Melville, Rhode Island.

In company with her sister boats L-1, L-2, L-3, L-4, L-9, L-11, E-class submarine E-1, along with the submarine tenders Bushnell, with Captain Thomas C. Hart, Commander, Submarine Flotilla embarked, and Fulton, L-10 cleared Narragansett Bay, on 4 December.

Having charted a direct course to the Azores, Hart's force ran into a gale which scattered them and required a pause to re-assemble at Bermuda, Base No. 24, on 13 December 1917. L-10 then proceeded to Ponta Delgada, Azores, Base No. 13, where she arrived on 18 December, with L-1. After undergoing repairs, L-10 conducted patrols into the New Year in the waters of the Portuguese archipelago to deny their use by German U-boats and surface raiders.

=== 1918 ===
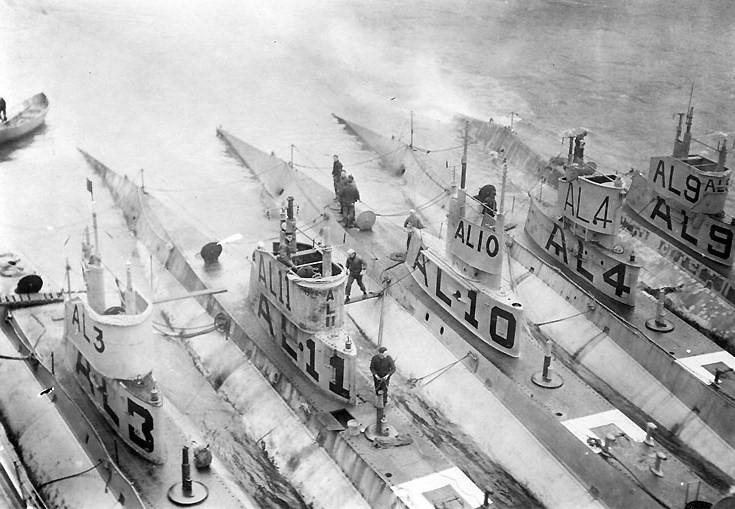
L-class submarines L-3, L-11, L-10, L-4, and L-9 alongside their submarine tender, in British waters in 1918. The "A" (for "American") was added to avoid confusion with British L-class submarines.

Clearing the Azores, on 19 January 1918, she proceeded to Ireland, reaching, Castletownbere (Berehaven), Bantry Bay, Ireland, on 26 January.

Upon arrival in the war zone, in order to differentiate them from the British L-class submarines, the US boats were re-designated with the suffix "A" (American) and the letters and numerals identifying them were painted onto the fairwaters of the US boats.

Though under the nominal command of Vice Admiral Sims, Hart's US submarines in Ireland, came under Vice Admiral Sir Lewis Bayly, RN, Commander-in-Chief, Coast of Ireland, and his submarine commander, Captain Sir Martin E. Nasmith, later Dunbar-Nasmith, RN. Bayly initially ordered Hart to deploy only one of his submarines at a time at sea, and that Royal Navy officers were to always be informed of departures and returns. Their patrol area was also to be limited to seaward of the Fastnet Lighthouse, so as to keep clear of British patrols and to avoid potentially fatal friendly-fire incidents.

The submarines were originally to be based from Queenstown, now known as Cobh, Ireland, but that proved unsatisfactory for Lieutenant Commander Harold M. Bemis' Division Five, as it was also serving as the headquarters for the surface patrol forces. As a result, the US submarines were relocated to a base at Berehaven, on 5 February.

AL-10 operated with Downes, from 2–5 February 1918, to train the latter's oscillator operators. In the ensuing days, from 6–16 February, the division trained in Bantry Bay, conducting dives and tactical maneuvers, under the charge of the commander of the Royal Navy's Submarine Flotilla, on board Ambrose also based at Berehaven. US submarine officers also trained with a "submarine attack war game" apparatus on board the submarine depot ship HMS Vulcan.

The American submarines' patrols were to be based on eight-day rotations, there would be eight days on patrol and eight days in port for overhaul, re-provision, and rest in preparation for the next eight-day patrol.

AL-10 departed Berehaven, on 22 March 1918, at 12:30, for a patrol of sector "QA", which she conducted from 23 to 29 March. During that time, Trippe mistook AL-10 for a German U-boat, on 25 March, and dropped depth charges on an oil slick, but at some distance that proved to be no danger to the boat. AL-10 subsequently surfaced and deployed a recognition signal. While Trippe later reported that the calm and clear conditions enabled her to track the submarine's movements, investigation revealed that AL-10, due to faulty navigation, was not in her proper patrol section. This, in combination with the observable oil slick, prompted her being observed and attacked with depth charges.

After additional patrols, AL-10 arrived for refit at Queenstown, on 15 April 1918. The submarine cleared Queenstown, on 8 May, with her yard work completed, and returned to Berehaven, after which she resumed her rotation of patrols and time in port.

On 4 August, she was conducting an exercise with AL-1, in which the torpedo fired malfunctioned and was lost. On 29 August, AL-9 and AL-10 began conducting training exercises. Upon completing that evolution each deployed to their respective patrol sector off Ireland, and made their return to Berehaven, on 14 September. AL-10 continued her scheduled routine into November, shifting to Portland, England, for training. She was still there when the Armistice, ended hostilities on 11 November.

=== 1919-1922 ===
After the Armistice, AL-10 remained in British waters, until sailing for the United States, on 3 January 1919. Proceeding via the Azores and Bermuda, AL-10 reached the Philadelphia Navy Yard, with the other submarines of her division, on 1 February.

L-10 underwent post-deployment overhaul and refit, at Philadelphia, after which, on 26 May 1919, she proceeded to the Submarine Base, Hampton Roads. Operating from either that place or the Norfolk Navy Yard, Portsmouth, she conducted training and developed submarine tactics in the waters of the lower Chesapeake Bay and the [[]Virginia capes]]. She cleared Hampton Roads, and went to sea on 16 July. Returning to Hampton Roads on 28 July, she remained there until 8 September, when she proceeded up the Chesapeake, to make visits to Annapolis and Baltimore, Maryland. She returned to Hampton Roads, on 18 September, and remained there until moving to Norfolk, on 18 November. She would remain at the Norfolk Navy Yard, until 19 August 1920, when she shifted to Hampton Roads. During this time, on 17 July 1920, she was redesignated SS-50 as part of a Navy-wide administrative re-organization. The submarine cleared Hampton Roads, on 26 August, and proceeded up the Chesapeake, and into the Potomac River, to visit the Washington Navy Yard. She then returned to Hampton Roads, on 16 October. Clearing the Submarine Base, she made a visit to Hamilton, Bermuda, before returning to Hampton Roads.

L-10, now assigned to the Repair Division, departed Hampton Roads, for the final time, on 8 January 1921, and arrived the following day at the Philadelphia Navy Yard. Just over two months later, on 26 March, the Repair Division was dissolved, and L-10, along with L-1, L-2, L-3, L-4, L-9, L-11, and E-1, were reassigned to Submarine Division Three, which was based on an inactive status, at Philadelphia.

== Fate ==
L-10 was decommissioned at the Philadelphia Navy Yard, on 5 May 1922. Sold as a hulk, on 31 July 1922, to the Henry A. Hitner's Sons Company, of Philadelphia, she was removed from the Philadelphia Navy Yard, on 19 September 1922, and delivered to her purchaser for scrapping.

== Navy Cross ==
The commanding officer of L-10, Lieutenant Commander James C. Van de Carr, received the Navy Cross for his services during World War I.

The Navy Cross is awarded to Lieutenant Commander James C. Van de Carr, U.S. Navy, for distinguished service in the line of his profession in command of the AL-10. While en route from Newport to the Azores, the submarine which he commanded was separated from the escort and the other submarines of the squadron, leaving him without a rendezvous. He thereupon proceeded to destination successfully, assuming the great responsibility of starting a 1,700-mile Atlantic Ocean run in winter weather and in a submarine of a class that had never been considered reliable under such conditions. He later performed creditable submarine patrol service within the war zone.

== Bibliography ==
- "Table 21 - Ships on Navy List June 30, 1919". Congressional Serial Set. U.S. Government Printing Office: 767. 1921.
- Mohl, Michael. "L-10 (SS-50)". Navsource.net.
- Friedman, Norman (1995). U.S. Submarines Through 1945: An Illustrated Design History. Annapolis, Maryland: Naval Institute Press. ISBN 1-55750-263-3.
- Gardiner, Robert & Gray, Randal (1985). Conway's All the World's Fighting Ships 1906–1921. Annapolis, Maryland: Naval Institute Press. ISBN 0-85177-245-5.
- Havern, Christopher B. Sr. (18 May 2020). "L-10 (Submarine No. 50)". Dictionary of American Naval Fighting Ships. Navy Department, Naval History and Heritage Command. This article incorporates text from this source, which is in the public domain.
