= USS L-9 =

L-class submarine of the United States

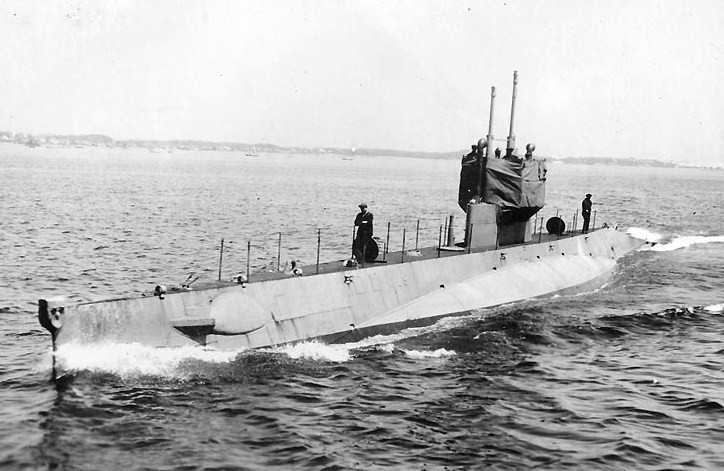
- USS L-9 underway, probably while running trials in 1916

History

United States
- Name: L-9
- Builder: Fore River Shipbuilding Company, Quincy, Massachusetts
- Cost: $569,123.43 (hull and machinery)
- Laid down: 2 November 1914
- Launched: 27 October 1915
- Sponsored by: Miss Heather P. Baxter
- Commissioned: 4 August 1916
- Decommissioned: 4 May 1923
- Stricken: 18 December 1930
- Identification: Hull symbol: SS-49 (17 July 1920); Call sign: NYV
- Fate: Sold for scrapping, 28 November 1933

General characteristics
- Type: L-class submarine
- Displacement: 450 long tons (457 t) surfaced; 548 long tons (557 t) submerged
- Length: 167 ft 5 in (51.03 m)
- Beam: 17 ft 5 in (5.31 m)
- Draft: 13 ft 7 in (4.14 m)
- Installed power: 450 hp (340 kW) (diesel engines); 170 hp (130 kW) (electric motors)
- Propulsion: 2 × NELSECO diesel engines; 2 × Electro Dynamic electric motors; 2 × 60-cell batteries; 2 × Propellers
- Speed: 14 kn (26 km/h; 16 mph) surfaced; 10.5 kn (19.4 km/h; 12.1 mph) submerged
- Range: 3,300 nmi (6,100 km; 3,800 mi) at 11 kn (20 km/h; 13 mph) surfaced; 150 nmi (280 km; 170 mi) at 5 kn (9.3 km/h; 5.8 mph) submerged
- Test depth: 200 ft (61 m)
- Capacity: 18,977 US gal (71,840 L; 15,802 imp gal) fuel
- Complement: 2 officers; 26 enlisted
- Armament: 4 × 18 inch (450 mm) bow torpedo tubes (8 torpedoes); 1 × 3 in (76 mm)/23 caliber deck gun

USS L-9 (SS-49), also known as "Submarine No. 49", was an L-class submarine of the United States Navy. She and her sister boats worked on submarine tactics in the Gulf of Mexico, Caribbean, and East Coast, prior to sailing to the Azores, and later stationed in Ireland, during WWI.

== Design ==
The L-class boats designed by Electric Boat (L-1 to L-4 and L-9 to L-11) were built to slightly different specifications from the other L boats, which were designed by Lake Torpedo Boat, and are sometimes considered a separate class. The Electric Boat submarines had a length of 168 ft 6 in (51.4 m) overall, a beam of 17 ft 5 in (5.3 m) and a mean draft of 13 ft 7 in (4.1 m). They displaced 450 long tons (460 t) on the surface and 548 long tons (557 t) submerged. The L-class submarines had a crew of 28 officers and enlisted men. They had a diving depth of 200 ft (61.0 m).

For surface running, the Electric Boat submarines were powered by two 450-brake-horsepower (336 kW) diesel engines, each driving one propeller shaft. When submerged each propeller was driven by a 170-horsepower (127 kW) electric motor. They could reach 14 kn (26 km/h; 16 mph) on the surface and 10.5 kn (19.4 km/h; 12.1 mph) underwater. On the surface, the boats had a range of 5,150 nmi (9,540 km; 5,930 mi) at 11 kn (20 km/h; 13 mph) and 150 nmi (280 km; 170 mi) at 5 kn (9.3 km/h; 5.8 mph) submerged.

The boats were armed with four 18-inch (450 mm) torpedo tubes in the bow. They carried four reloads, for a total of eight torpedoes. The Electric Boat submarines were initially not fitted with a deck gun; a single 3 in (76 mm)/23 caliber on a disappearing mount was added during the war.

== Construction ==
L-9's keel was laid down on 2 November 1914, by Fore River Shipbuilding Company, in Quincy, Massachusetts. She was launched on 27 October 1915, sponsored by Miss Heather Pattison Baxter, and commissioned on 4 August 1916.

== Service history ==
=== 1916 ===
On 5 August, L-9 was assigned to Division Six, Submarine Flotilla, Atlantic Fleet, and her commander was ordered to report to the Commander, Submarine Force, on board the ex-monitor, turned submarine tender, Ozark, at the Boston Navy Yard. L-9 initially operated in the waters off New England conducting shakedown. By December, she had moved to the Norfolk Navy Yard, in Portsmouth, Virginia, to undergo preparations for her cruise to Florida, and annual fleet exercises, in Cuban waters. She departed Norfolk, on 18 December, and arrived at Key West, Florida, on 23 December. After liberty for the Christmas holidays, she underwent preparation and tests based from Key West. On 30 December, she underwent overhaul for a damaged starboard engine.

=== 1917 ===
L-9 was to undergo trials at Pensacola, Florida, along with L-10 and L-11, and Rowan, on 1 February 1917.

As a result of heightened tensions with Imperial Germany, over the latter's resumption of unrestricted submarine warfare on 1 February 1917, most of the Atlantic Fleet had consolidated in the sheltered waters of the lower Chesapeake Bay, by 31 March. L-9 departed Pensacola, on 1 April, and made her way via Key West, to the Norfolk Navy Yard. While L-9 was en route, the US declared war on Germany, on 6 April, and entered World War I. The submarine lay at the Norfolk Navy Yard, on 7 April, and the next day shifted to Hampton Roads, Virginia. On 10 April, she departed bound for the Submarine Base, at New London, Connecticut. Arriving on April 12, she commenced transferring submarine equipment to the base from Ozark. This was completed the following day and after the division flag transferred to L-9, Ozark got underway. L-9 began overhaul on April 14, but complete overhaul was postponed.

She continued to be based at New London, until 6 May, when she departed. Bound for the Boston Navy Yard, she arrived on 8 May, and was based from the Navy Yard, until 30 June. Though she was sent to Boston, ostensibly for overhaul, she was engaged in experimental work off Nahant, Massachusetts. Though her engines badly needed repairs, she was towed out to Nahant, by a tug, while machinists worked on her engines. Despite these exercises, she was not considered operational until her overhaul could be completed. As that work was being undertaken, L-9 received orders transferring her from Division Six to Division Five.

In June 1917, Vice Admiral William S. Sims, Commander, US Naval Forces in European Waters, in June 1917, cited British success in using submarines as submarine hunter-killers in antisubmarine warfare (ASW). The Allied submarines, with their lower profiles, could approach U-boats more stealthily than larger surface patrol vessels. On 2 July, Admiral William S. Benson, Chief of Naval Operations, ordered the twelve most suitable submarines on the Atlantic coast be fitted out for duty in European waters.

L-9 completed her yard work and undocked, on 16 October 1917. She remained at the Boston Navy Yard, until all repairs and alterations recommended by the Trial Board were completed. It was also noted that the boat, "should be given to fire all torpedoes and to standardize over a measured mile at low speeds submerged". On 28 October, she was directed to proceed via the Cape Cod Canal, to Newport, Rhode Island, in company with L-10 and L-11. Upon arrival at Newport, the submarines were to, "carry out exercises to prepare the vessels", for immediate service. L-9 reported, on 3 November, having conducted tactical exercises, and torpedo and gun practices, in preparation for her deployment to European waters. Afterward, the crew had liberty to say farewell to their families before deploying.

L-9 cast off and stood out of Newport, on 4 December 1917, under her own power. When clear of land, she came under tow of the fleet tug Lykens, along with L-11 . Bushnell, with Captain Thomas C. Hart, Commander, Submarine Flotilla embarked, had two subs in tow, as did the tugs Genesee and Conestoga. In addition to L-9 and L-11, L-1, L-2, L-3, L-4, L-10, and E-class submarine E-1, were to make the passage under Hart's command.

As the force stood past Martha's Vineyard, Massachusetts, Bushnell signaled each boat to open their sealed orders. They were bound for Ponta Delgada, Base No. 13, in the Azores. The skies darkened and the barometer dropped; in heavy seas L-9 parted lines with Lykens on 7 December. L-9's commanding officer decided to turn into the wind to slow down, until Bushnell, about seven miles (11 km) to her rear, could come to her. That never happened, as she remained unseen in the darkness and heavy seas. The next day, the barometer rose and the seas calmed, which allowed the crew to take note of the damage to the boat and then to repair her Wireless antenna. She issued a call for Bushnell, but received no response. Her gyrocompass was also not functioning. As a result, she decided to return to Boston. Through heavy seas, and after sustaining additional light damage, she stood in to Boston, on 13 December.

In light of L-9's experience, Submarine Force, Atlantic Fleet, forwarded a confidential memorandum to the Office of the Secretary of the Navy, via the Bureau of Navigation, the Bureau of Steam Engineering, and the Bureau of Construction and Repair, "to invite attention to certain conditions encountered during extremely cold and heavy weather, which will affect the design of new submarines".

On 21 December, L-9 received a movement order directing her to shift to New London, Base No. 22, via the Cape Cod Canal, in company with Tonopah. She was then ordered to continue on to Hampton Roads, Base No. 3, on 28 December. The next day, while underway in a blizzard, the iron-hulled patrol vessel Berkshire, engaged in experimental underwater sound work, believing L-9 to be an enemy submarine, collided with the latter, bending the submarine's bow cap, which needed to be repaired. The Board of Investigation that was convened on board Tonopah, found that Berkshire, was solely responsible for the collision with L-9.

=== 1918 ===
L-9 stood at Hampton Roads, awaiting repairs, on New Year's Day, 1918. She finally departed the Submarine Base, at Hampton Roads, on 11 January. She was bound for Ireland, via Bermuda, and the Azores.

Upon arrival in the war zone, in order to differentiate them from the British L-class submarines, the US boats were re-designated with the suffix "A" (American) and the letters and numerals identifying them were painted onto the fairwaters of the US boats.

Though under the nominal command of Vice Admiral Sims, Hart's US submarines in Ireland, came under Vice Admiral Sir Lewis Bayly, RN, Commander-in-Chief, Coast of Ireland, and his submarine commander, Captain Sir Martin E. Nasmith, later Dunbar-Nasmith, RN. Bayly initially ordered Hart to deploy only one of his submarines at a time at sea, and that Royal Navy officers were to always be informed of departures and returns. Their patrol area was also to be limited to seaward of the Fastnet Lighthouse, so as to keep clear of British patrols and to avoid potentially fatal friendly-fire incidents.

The submarines were originally to be based from Queenstown, now known as Cobh, Ireland, but that proved unsatisfactory for Lieutenant Commander Harold M. Bemis' Division Five, as it was also serving as the headquarters for the surface patrol forces. As a result, the US submarines were relocated to a base at Castletownbere (Berehaven), Bantry Bay, on 5 February.

In the ensuing days, from 6–16 February, the division trained in Bantry Bay, conducting dives and tactical maneuvers under the charge of the commander of the Royal Navy's Submarine Flotilla, also based at Berehaven. US submarine officers also trained with a "submarine attack war game" apparatus on board the submarine depot ship HMS Vulcan.

The American submarines' patrols were to be based on eight-day rotations, there would be eight days on patrol and eight days in port for overhaul, re-provision, and rest in preparation for the next eight-day patrol.

AL-9's assigned patrol area was off the west coast of England, at the mouth of the Bristol Bay, the inshore boundary running close to Lundy Island. In early March 1918, AL-9 and AL-11, both departed on their initial patrols together, before heading to their respective patrol areas, each dived to check ballast and trim, and AL-9 conducted a simulated attack run on AL-11.

AL-9 arrived at Queenstown, to undergo refit alongside the destroyer tender Melville, at the Haulbowline Dockyard, on 6 May 1918. That work was completed by 11 June, at which time the submarine cleared the yard, and returned to Berehaven, to resume her patrols. While on patrol near the Trevose Head Lighthouse, on 28 September, AL-9 made a sound contact at approximately 5,000 yd (2.8 mi; 4.6 km), and came to periscope depth. She was unable to establish a visual contact. As she continued, the sound grew fainter and contact was eventually lost. Later in the day, the submarine encountered Stockton. The destroyer came close aboard and inquired if the submarine had seen any survivors from a sunken vessel. The submarine provided a negative reply and added that she had heard no torpedo detonations. Stockton, and her fellow destroyers, then proceeded to the north to continue their search.

On 31 October, AL-9 sighted, in the haze, what appeared to be a German U-boat about three miles (4.8 km) distant. She slowly submerged and made for the suspected enemy. She then heard two loud explosions close aboard. She surfaced and found a trawler armed with a 7-inch (178 mm) gun 1,000 yd (3,000 ft; 910 m) off their port bow and closing. Additional shots fired by the trawler landed 150 yd (450 ft; 140 m) away and shell fragments hit the superstructure, but produced no damage. The submarine detonated a smoke bomb and made the recognition signal. The trawler closed and enquired if their shots had done any damage. AL-9 replied, "No, thank you". After this close encounter with friendly-fire, AL-9 completed her patrol and returned to Bantry Bay, without any further incident, on 1 November, and secured alongside Bushnell. Just ten days later the Armistice went into effect and hostilities ceased, on 11 November.

=== 1919-1923 ===
After the Armistice, AL-9 shifted from her base at Berehaven, and operated from Portland, England, until she cleared on 3 January 1919, for the United States. Steaming via the Azores and Bermuda, the submarine reached the Philadelphia Navy Yard, on 1 February. Upon entering the yard, she underwent post-deployment overhaul and repairs. When completed, she cleared Philadelphia, and shifted to her new homeport, at the Submarine Base, headquartered onboard Eagle 17, Hampton Roads.

L-9 operated in the waters around Hampton Roads, and off the Virginia capes, from 18 June 1919, into September. On 8 September, she sailed up the Chesapeake Bay, to Annapolis, Maryland, before visiting Baltimore, Maryland, until 17 September. Afterwards, she returned to Hampton Roads, on 18 September and remained there through the end of the year, with the exception of a short period at the Norfolk Navy Yard, from 10–12 November. She returned to the Norfolk Navy Yard, on 8 January 1920, and remained there until 13 October, when she shifted back to Hampton Roads.

During this period, on 17 July 1920, she was redesignated SS-49 as part of a Navy-wide administrative re-organization. On 16 November, L-9 received orders transferring her homeport and that of L-1, L-2, L-3, L-4, L-10, L-11, and M-1, from Submarine Base, Eagle 17, Hampton Roads, to the Submarine Repair Division, Philadelphia Navy Yard. L-9 arrived at Philadelphia, on 3 February 1921. The Submarine Repair Division was subsequently abolished, on 26 March 1921, and the submarines were assigned to Submarine Division Three, in an inactive status. On 1 June, L-9, along with L-1, L-2, L-3, L-4, L-10, L-11, and M-1, were considered as placed in commission in ordinary. As of 18 April 1922, L-9, along with L-2, L-3, and L-11, were considered to be in good operating condition as second line submarines. She shifted to New London, on 22 September.

Despite her operational assessment, L-9 was placed in reduced commission, at New London, on 1 May 1922, along with L-2, L-3, L-11, N-1, N-2, and N-3. Just over a week later, on 9 May, L-9 was assigned to Submarine Division Zero, at New London. On 17 January 1923, the boat departed New London, for the Portsmouth Navy Yard, Kittery, Maine, where she docked the next day. Clearing the yard on 9 March, she returned up the Thames River to New London, on 10 March. Four days later, she was again underway, bound for a return to Hampton Roads; she reached and moored on 15 March 1922.

== Fate ==
L-9 was decommissioned at Submarine Base, Hampton Roads, on 4 May 1923. She was towed to Norfolk Navy Yard, for drydocking on 26 August 1924. After clearing the yard, she was towed to the Philadelphia Navy Yard, arriving on 4 November. L-9 was stricken from the Navy Register on 18 December 1930, and was scrapped on 28 November 1933.

== Bibliography ==
- "Table 21 - Ships on Navy List June 30, 1919". Congressional Serial Set. U.S. Government Printing Office: 767. 1921.
- Mohl, Michael. "L-9 (SS-49)". Navsource.net.
- Friedman, Norman (1995). U.S. Submarines Through 1945: An Illustrated Design History. Annapolis, Maryland: Naval Institute Press. ISBN 1-55750-263-3.
- Gardiner, Robert & Gray, Randal (1985). Conway's All the World's Fighting Ships 1906–1921. Annapolis, Maryland: Naval Institute Press. ISBN 0-85177-245-5.
- Havern, Christopher B. Sr. (10 May 2021). "L-9 (Submarine No. 49)". Dictionary of American Naval Fighting Ships. Navy Department, Naval History and Heritage Command. This article incorporates text from this source, which is in the public domain.
