= United States L-class submarine =

United States Navy submarine class

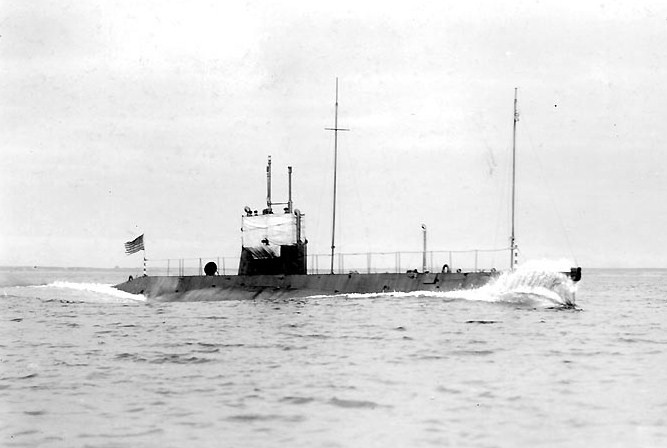
- USS L-1, lead ship of her class during running trials

Class overview
- Name: L class
- Builders: Electric Boat Company design: Fore River Shipbuilding Company, Quincy, Massachusetts (L-1 to L-4, L-9 to L-11); Lake Torpedo Boat Company design: Lake Torpedo Boat Company, Bridgeport, Connecticut (L-5); California Shipbuilding Company, Long Beach, California (L-6 & L-7); Portsmouth Navy Yard, Kittery, Maine (L-8)
- Operators: United States Navy
- Preceded by: K class
- Succeeded by: USS M-1
- Built: 1914–1917
- In commission: 1916–1923
- Planned: 11
- Completed: 11
- Scrapped: 11

General characteristics
- Class & type: L-1-class (L-1 to L-4, L-9 to L-11)
- Type: Submarine
- Displacement: 450 long tons (457 t) surfaced; 548 long tons (557 t) submerged
- Length: 168 ft 5 in (51.33 m)
- Beam: 17 ft 4 in (5.28 m)
- Draft: 13 ft 7 in (4.14 m)
- Installed power: 900 bhp (670 kW) diesel; 340 hp (250 kW) electric
- Propulsion: 2 × NELSECO Diesel engines; 2 × Electro Dynamic electric motors; 2 × 60-cell batteries; 2 × Propellers
- Speed: 14 kn (26 km/h; 16 mph) surfaced; 10.5 kn (19.4 km/h; 12.1 mph) submerged
- Range: 4,500 nmi (8,300 km; 5,200 mi) at 7 kn (13 km/h; 8.1 mph) surfaced; 150 nmi (280 km; 170 mi) at 5 kn (9.3 km/h; 5.8 mph) submerged
- Test depth: 200 ft (61 m)
- Complement: 2 officers; 26 enlisted
- Armament: 4 × 18 inch (450 mm) bow torpedo tubes (8 torpedoes); 1 × 3 in (76 mm)/23 caliber retractable deck gun

General characteristics
- Class & type: L-5-class (L-5 to L-8)
- Type: Submarine
- Displacement: 451 long tons (458 t) surfaced; 527 long tons (535 t) submerged
- Length: 165 ft (50 m)
- Beam: 14 ft 9 in (4.50 m)
- Draft: 13 ft 3 in (4.04 m)
- Installed power: 1,200 bhp (890 kW) (diesel engines), 800 hp (600 kW) (electric motors)
- Propulsion: Diesel-electric; 2 × Busch-Sulzer Diesel engines; 2 × Diehl electric motors; 1 × 120-cell battery; 2 × Propellers
- Speed: 14 kn surfaced; 10.5 kn submerged
- Range: 4500 nmi at 7 kn surfaced; 150 nmi at 5 kn submerged
- Test depth: 200 ft
- Complement: 2 officers; 26 enlisted
- Armament: 4 × 18 inch bow torpedo tubes (8 torpedoes)

The United States L-class submarines were a class of 11 coastal defense submarines built 1914–1917, and were the most modern and capable submarines available to United States Navy when the country entered World War I. Despite being considered a successful design by the USN, war experience in European waters demonstrated that the boats lacked the range, speed, and endurance to conduct extended patrols in the North Atlantic.

== Design ==
These submarines were built to two distinctly different designs at four separate shipyards. The Electric Boat Company (EB) of New York City, later Groton, Connecticut, went the route they followed with previous designs and simply scaled up their standard single hull, spindle shaped, twin propeller, axial rudder design to meet the requirements of the Navy. They were contracted for L-1 through L-4 and L-9 through L-11, and these would be built at EB's sub-contractor, the Fore River Shipbuilding Company, in Quincy, Massachusetts. For the first time EB did away with the rotating bow cap for the torpedo tube muzzle doors. It was replaced by individual faired-in shutter doors that would later become a standard design feature. Simon Lake's Lake Torpedo Boat Company returned to the fold and submitted a very different design that would become L-5 through L-8. These boats were similar in size and capability to the EB design, but they had a ventrally mounted rudder and propeller shafts, a watertight superstructure to aid in surface buoyancy, and different engines and motors. They also had three sets of amidships mounted diving planes, as opposed to EB's standard bow and stern planes. The only one of the four that would actually be built at Lake's Bridgeport, Connecticut, yard was L-5. The Navy wanted some of the boats built at a West Coast shipyard, so Lake sub-contracted with the Craig Shipbuilding Company, of Long Beach, California, to build L-6 and L-7. Desirous of creating their own in-house submarine construction capability, the Navy's Bureau of Construction and Repair obtained a license from Lake to build the L-8 at the government owned Portsmouth Navy Yard, in Kittery, Maine. L-8 would be the first of many submarines built at government Navy Yards.

The Electric Boat submarines, referred to as the L-1-class, had a length of 168 ft 5 in (51.3 m) overall, a beam of 17 ft 4 in (5.3 m), and a mean draft of 13 ft 7 in (4.1 m). They displaced 450 long tons (460 t), on the surface, and 548 long tons (557 t), submerged. All L-class boats had a crew of 2 officers and 26 enlisted men. They all had a diving depth of 200 ft (61.0 m).

The Lake submarines, referred to as the L-5-class, had a length of 165 ft (50.3 m) overall, a beam of 14 ft 9 in (4.5 m), and a mean draft of 13 ft 3 in (4.0 m). They displaced 451 long tons (458 t), on the surface, and 527 long tons (535 t), submerged.

For surface running, the Electric Boat submarines were powered by two NELSECO 450-brake-horsepower (336 kW) diesel engines, each driving one propeller shaft. When submerged each propeller was driven by an Electro Dynamic 170-horsepower (127 kW) electric motor. The Lake boats had two Busch-Sulzer 600-brake-horsepower (447 kW) diesels, and two Diehl 400-horsepower (298 kW) electric motors. Regardless of designer, the L-class submarines could reach 14 kn (26 km/h; 16 mph) on the surface, and 10.5 kn (19.4 km/h; 12.1 mph) underwater. On the surface, the boats had a range of 4,500 nautical miles (8,300 km; 5,200 mi) at 7 kn (13 km/h; 8.1 mph), and 150 nmi (280 km; 170 mi) at 5 kn (9.3 km/h; 5.8 mph) submerged.

The boats were armed with four 18-inch (450 mm) torpedo tubes in the bow. They carried four reloads, for a total of eight torpedoes. The EB boats were also armed with a 3 in (76 mm)/23 caliber retractable deck gun forward of the conning tower. The gun was retracted vertically, with a round shield that fit over the top of a well in the superstructure that projected into the pressure hull. Most of the barrel protruded from the deck, resembling a stanchion. The round shield doubled as a blast deflector for the gun crew, and as the watertight top of the well. This gun was roundly disliked by the submarine crews because it lacked range, hitting power, and had the tendency to retract back into the well when fired, presenting a great hazard to the gun crew.

As in previous US designs, the conning tower and fairwater was kept small for reduced drag when submerged. For extended surface runs, the fairwater was augmented with a temporary piping-and-canvas structure which took considerable time to deploy and dismantle. Experience in World War I showed that this was inadequate in the North Atlantic weather, and these boats, along with other submarines serving overseas in that war, E-class and K-class, had their bridge structures replaced with a permanent steel "chariot" shield on the front of the bridge. Chariot style bridges became standard on later U.S. submarines.

== Service ==
When the US entered the First World War, most of the Electric Boat built submarines required extensive refits at the Philadelphia Navy Yard, which reflected the US Navy's limited experience in submarine ocean operations. In December 1917, the seven boats were sent to Bantry Bay, as Submarine Division 5, for convoy escort and antisubmarine (ASW) patrols against Imperial German U-boats. The four new Lake design L-boats later deployed to the Azores, in November 1918, as Division 6, to reinforce four K-class submarines, sent there in October 1917. While forward deployed, US L-class submarines had the letter "A" added to the name displayed on the fairwater (i.e. AL-1) to avoid confusion with British L-class submarines.

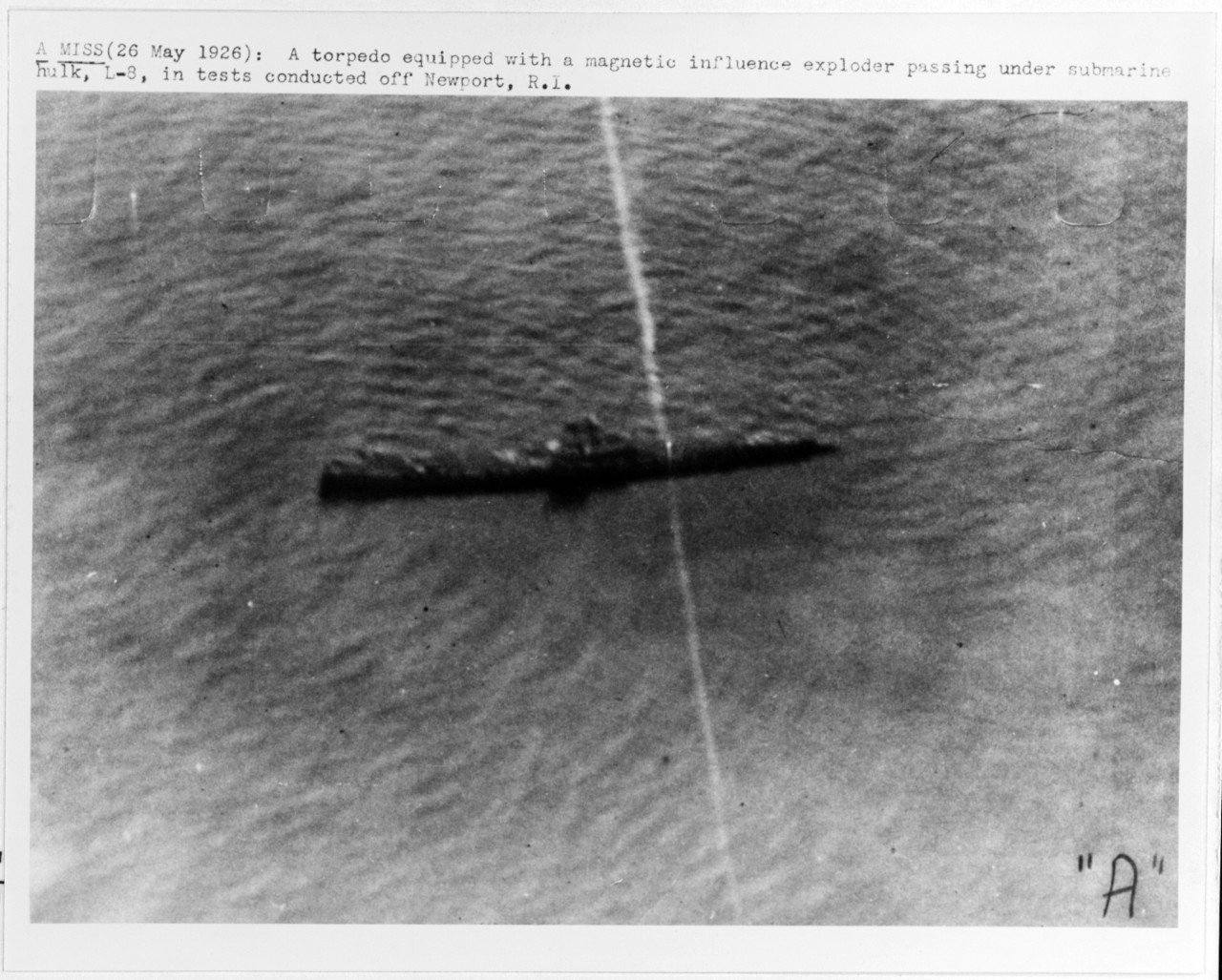
L-8 acting as a target for torpedo testing off Newport, Rhode Island, 26 May 1926, this was obviously a miss, but another shot later that day sank her

US submarines did not sink any U-boats in World War I, despite the immense effort of getting them to the war zone. Many lessons were learned and these were poured into the design of follow-on submarines. After the war, the L-class were involved in trials of new torpedoes and hydrophone equipment on both the East and West Coasts, before decommissioning in 1922 and 1923. At least L-3, L-9, and L-11 were re-engined with [Busch-Sulzer diesel engines removed from Lake-built N-boats in 1921. Three EB design boats were scrapped in 1922, the four Lake design boats were scrapped in 1925, and the remainder were scrapped in 1933, under the London Naval Treaty limiting naval armament.

== Boats in class ==
Construction data
Ship name	Hull class and no.	Builder	Laid down	Launched	Comm.	Decomm.	Reclass. hull no.	Reclass. hull no. date	Fate
L-1	Submarine No. 40	Fore River Shipbuilding, Quincy, Massachusetts	13 April 1914	20 January 1915	11 April 1916	7 April 1922	SS-40	17 July 1920	Sold for scrapping, 31 July 1922
L-2	Submarine No. 41	Fore River Shipbuilding, Quincy, Massachusetts	19 March 1914	11 February 1915	29 September 1916	4 May 1923	SS-41	17 July 1920	Sold for scrapping, 28 November 1933
L-3	Submarine No. 42	Fore River Shipbuilding, Quincy, Massachusetts	18 April 1914	15 March 1915	22 April 1916	11 June 1923	SS-42	17 July 1920	Sold for scrapping, 28 November 1933
L-4	Submarine No. 43	Fore River Shipbuilding, Quincy, Massachusetts	23 March 1914	3 April 1915	4 May 1916	14 April 1922	SS-43	17 July 1920	Sold for scrapping, 31 July 1922
L-5	Submarine No. 44	Lake Torpedo Boat Company, Bridgeport, Connecticut	14 May 1914	1 May 1916	17 February 1918	5 December 1922	SS-44	17 July 1920	Sold for scrapping, 21 December 1925
L-6	Submarine No. 45	Craig Shipbuilding Company, Long Beach, California	27 May 1914	31 August 1916	7 December 1917	25 November 1922	SS-45	17 July 1920	Sold for scrapping, 21 December 1925
L-7	Submarine No. 46	Craig Shipbuilding Company, Long Beach, California	2 June 1914	28 September 1916	7 December 1917	15 November 1922	SS-46	17 July 1920	Sold for scrapping, 21 December 1925
L-8	Submarine No. 48	Portsmouth Navy Yard, Kittery, Maine	24 February 1915	23 April 1917	30 August 1917	15 November 1922	SS-48	17 July 1920	Sunk as target, 26 May 1926
L-9	Submarine No. 49	Fore River Shipbuilding, Quincy, Massachusetts	2 November 1914	27 October 1915	4 August 1916	4 May 1923	SS-49	17 July 1920	Sold for scrapping, 28 November 1933
L-10	Submarine No. 50	Fore River Shipbuilding, Quincy, Massachusetts	17 February 1915	16 March 1916	2 August 1916	5 May 1922	SS-50	17 July 1920	Sold for scrapping, 31 July 1922
L-11	Submarine No. 51	Fore River Shipbuilding, Quincy, Massachusetts	17 February 1915	16 May 1916	15 August 1916	28 November 1923	SS-51	17 July 1920	Sold for scrapping, 28 November 1933

== See also ==
- List of submarine classes of the United States Navy

== Bibliography ==
- Friedman, Norman (1995). US Submarines through 1945: An Illustrated Design History. Annapolis, Maryland: Naval Institute Press. ISBN 1-55750-263-3.
- Gardiner, Robert; Gray, Randal, eds. (1985). Conway's All the World's Fighting Ships 1906–1921. Conway Maritime Press. ISBN 0-85177-245-5.
- Hedman, Ric; Johnston, David (8 May 2025). "Submarine Specifications". Pigboats.com.
- Hedman, Ric; Johnston, David (8 May 2025a). "L-class". Pigboats.com.
- DiGiulian, Tony (1 August 2023). "3"/23.5 (7.62 cm) Marks 4 and 14 3"/23 (7.62 cm) Marks 7, 9, 11 and 13". Navweaps.com.
- Christley, Jim (2010). "U.S. Submarine Deck Guns" (PDF). PigBoats.COM.
