= York Spit Light =

Lighthouse in Virginia, United States

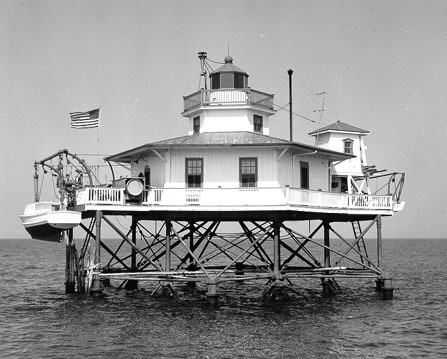
- Undated photograph of York Spit Light (USCG)
- Location: At the mouth of the York River in the Chesapeake Bay
- Coordinates: 37.2096°N 76.2542°W

Tower
- Foundation: screw-pile
- Construction: cast-iron/wood
- Shape: hexagonal house

Light
- First lit: 1870
- Deactivated: 1960
- Focal height: 9 m (30 ft)
- Characteristic: Fl W 6s

The York Spit Light was a lighthouse located at the mouth of the York River in the Chesapeake Bay, marking a long shoal paralleling the main channel into the river.

== History ==
This light replaced lightships stationed at this location beginning in 1853. Extra fender piles were added to the usual six pile structure in order to provide extra stability against the current. In 1903, riprap was placed around the piles for additional protection. A hurricane in September 1933 damaged the light.

The house was removed and replaced with an automated light in 1960 as part of the program of decommissioning at that time. More recently, this light was damaged in a hurricane, and a separate light on a single pole was erected next to the old screw-pile foundation.
