= Thomas C. Hart =

American Navy admiral and politician (1877–1971)

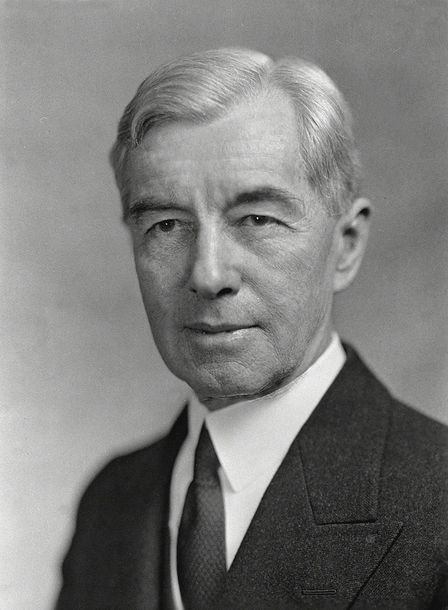

United States Senator from Connecticut
- In office February 15, 1945 – November 5, 1946
- Appointed by: Raymond E. Baldwin
- Preceded by: Francis T. Maloney
- Succeeded by: Raymond E. Baldwin

Personal details
- Born: Thomas Charles Hart; June 12, 1877 Davison, Michigan, U.S.
- Died: July 4, 1971 (aged 94) Sharon, Connecticut, U.S.
- Resting place: Arlington National Cemetery
- Party: Republican
- Spouse: Caroline Robinson Brownson (m. 1910)
- Children: Roswell Roberts Hart, Thomas Comins Hart, Harriet Taft (Hart) Sayre

Military service
- Allegiance: United States
- Branch/service: United States Navy
- Years of service: 1897–1945
- Rank: Admiral
- Commands: USS Chicago; Submarine Division 2 Submarine Division 5 USS Mississippi; Submarine Flotilla 3 Cruiser Division 6 United States Asiatic Fleet; ABDAFLOAT
- Battles/wars: Spanish–American War: Battle of Santiago de Cuba; World War I World War II: Philippines campaign (1941–1942); Dutch East Indies Campaign
- Awards: Distinguished Service Medal (2)

Thomas Charles Hart (June 12, 1877 – July 4, 1971) was a United States Navy admiral whose service extended from the Spanish–American War through World War II. Following his retirement from the Navy, he served briefly as a United States Senator from Connecticut, becoming the highest-ranking military official ever to serve in Congress.

== Life and career ==
Hart was born in Davison, Michigan. He attended the United States Naval Academy at Annapolis, graduating 13th in a class of 47 in 1897. Naval policy at the time required two years of sea duty following graduation from Annapolis before a naval cadet was commissioned an ensign. Hart spent the next two years aboard the battleship USS Massachusetts (BB-2). During the Spanish–American War, Massachusetts became part of the American fleet blockading the Spanish squadron at Santiago de Cuba. Hart received a letter of commendation for his command of a steam cutter dispatched to reconnoiter Cabanas Bay for possible landing sites. Under a withering fusillade of fire from Spanish shore batteries, Hart completed the mission and returned his craft to the ship without any casualties although the skiff was struck several times. Because of his ship handling skills, Hart was sent to augment the crew of a converted yacht, USS Vixen (PY-4). under Lt. Alexander Sharp Jr. and executive officer Ensign Arthur MacArthur III, older brother of Douglas MacArthur. The three quickly became lifelong friends.

Following the Spanish–American War, Hart spent two years on the sloop-of-war USS Hartford, after which he was posted to the Naval Academy, where he taught ordnance and gunnery for two years. While at Annapolis, he courted Miss Caroline Brownson, daughter of Rear Admiral Willard H. Brownson, then superintendent of the Naval Academy and later commander of the Asiatic Fleet in 1906–07. Following his time at Annapolis, Hart served as a division officer on USS Missouri (BB-11) and then assumed his first command, the destroyer USS Lawrence (DD-8). At that time, LCDR Hart was assigned to inspect the building of the new Delaware-class battleship North Dakota at the Fore River Shipyard in Quincy, Massachusetts, to which he was assigned prior to its commissioning on Monday, April 11, 1910. The Harts spent their honeymoon at the newly rebuilt luxury resort "The Homestead", in Hot Springs, Bath County, Virginia.

Following his assignment on USS North Dakota, Hart became qualified to command submarines. In 1917 he was chief of staff to the Commander, Submarine Force, Atlantic Fleet (COMSUBLANT), commanding COMSUBLANT's flagship Chicago at New London, Connecticut. He also served in World War I as Director of Submarine Operations for the Navy Department. Serving in this office as its head until 1922, Hart fought doggedly to improve the lot of the submarine arm of the navy. His tenacity was responsible for the U.S. Navy's acquisition of surrendered German U-boats after World War I to learn the details of the technical innovations incorporated in the erstwhile enemy craft. Examination and trials of these U-boats were very influential in subsequent US Navy submarine design. He also was involved in the development of the Mark 6 torpedo exploder.

After World War I, Hart commanded USS Mississippi. From 1931–34, Hart was Superintendent of the United States Naval Academy.

An unsuccessful recommendation of Hart's while on the General Board, beginning in 1936, was the building of small submarines. Hart's plan was to replace the aging S-boats, R-boats, and O-boats to provide area defense of submarine bases. This plan resulted in only two experimental submarines, Mackerel and Marlin. During this period, Hart successfully advocated the building of large destroyer leaders, later classified as anti-aircraft light cruisers (CLAAs), which became the Atlanta class and others.

== World War II ==
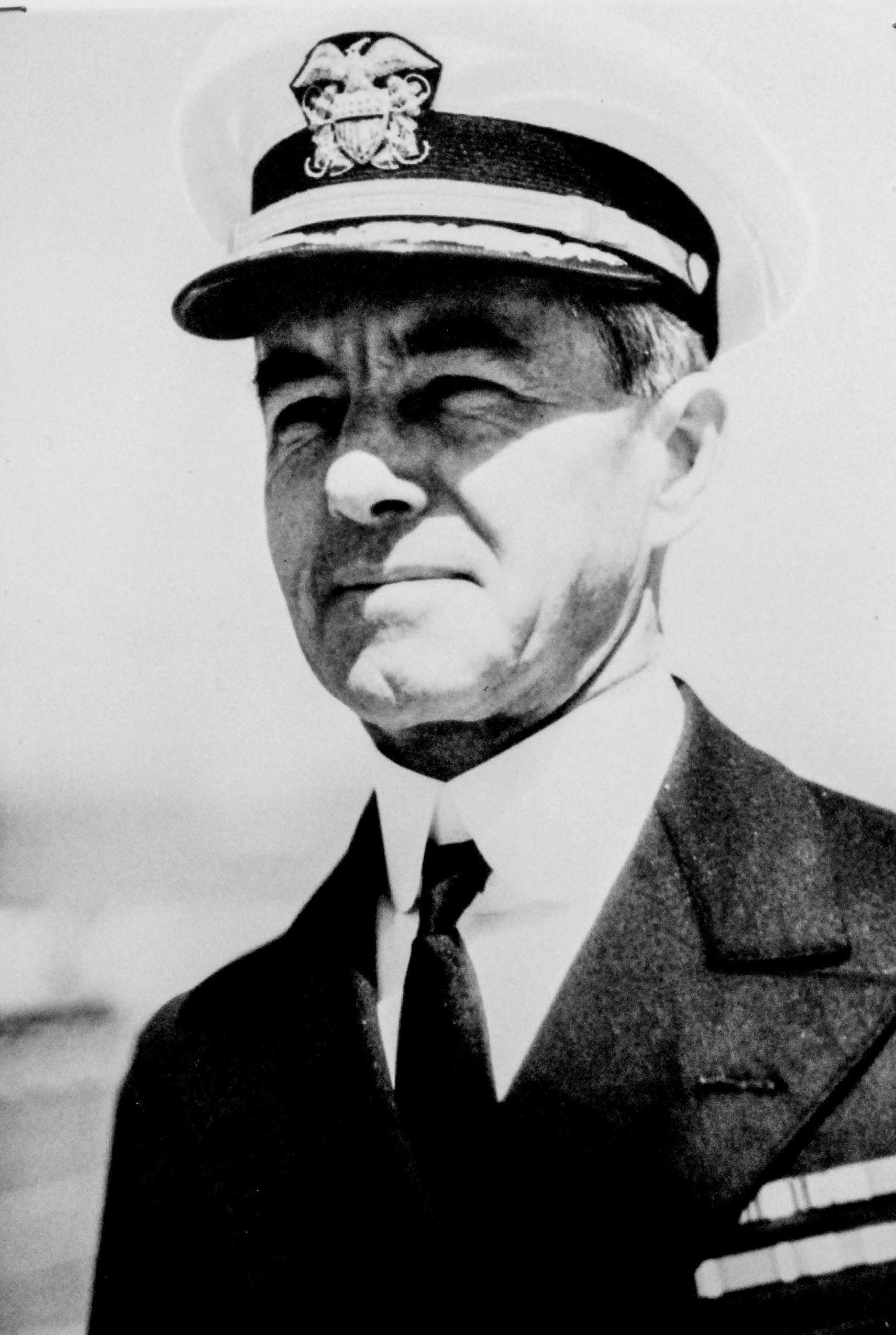
Hart in 1942

Hart was appointed commander in chief, U.S. Asiatic Fleet on July 25, 1939, and was promoted to admiral the same day. He held that position at the commencement of hostilities in World War II between Japan and the United States in December 1941. The majority of forces under Hart's command were located in the Philippines, with a small force of destroyers and a light cruiser based in Borneo. His command included the majority of the combat-ready US submarines in the Pacific. Hart initially commanded U.S. naval forces from Manila, but was forced to relocate to Java on January 15, 1942, in light of rapid Japanese advances through the Philippine archipelago. On his relocation to Java, Hart was named Commander, Naval Forces, ABDA Command, a joint British, Dutch, American and Australian military command, formed for purposes of holding the southern portions of the Dutch East Indies against further Japanese advances. While in command of ABDA naval forces, ships under his command fought the Battle of Balikpapan, a tactical victory, but strategic defeat for the allied forces. Hart held the command of the U.S. Navy Asiatic Fleet until February 5, 1942, at which point the command ceased to exist as part of a broader U.S. military command restructuring in the Southwest Pacific. Hart continued to hold the position of commander for ABDA naval forces until relieved of operational responsibilities on February 12, 1942. Hart formally was relieved of this title on February 16, 1942, when he left Java, ostensibly for health reasons (and for political reasons as he was undermined by his British and Dutch subordinate national component commanders). He returned to the US via Batavia to Ceylon on a British passenger vessel, and then onto the United States.

Hart returned to the United States on March 8, 1942. President Roosevelt presented Hart with a Gold Star in lieu of a second Distinguished Service Medal in July 1942 (his first Distinguished Service Medal having been awarded for his service in World War I) for "[h]is conduct of the operations of the Allied naval forces in the Southwest Pacific area during January and February 1942, was characterized by unfailing judgment and sound decision, coupled with marked moral courage, in the face of discouraging surroundings and complex associations." Hart was retired with the rank of admiral in July 1942, but recalled to duty in August 1942 as a member of the U.S. Navy's General Board. Hart retired from active duty a second time in February 1945, on his appointment to the U.S. Senate to fill the seat of Francis T. Maloney, on Maloney's death.

== Personal life ==
Hart married Caroline Robinson Brownson (1884–1982) on March 30, 1910.

Hart's daughter Harriet Taft Hart married Francis B. Sayre, Jr., who was the son of President Woodrow Wilson's daughter Jessie Woodrow Wilson Sayre.

== Death and legacy ==
Upon his death on July 4, 1971, Hart was buried at Arlington National Cemetery.

USS Thomas C. Hart (FF-1092), commissioned in 1973, was named for Hart and was sponsored by Hart's granddaughter, Penny Hart Bragonier.

== Decorations ==
Here is the ribbon bar of Admiral Hart:

Officer Submarine Badge
1st Row	Navy Distinguished Service Medal with Gold Star		Sampson Medal
2nd Row	Spanish Campaign Medal	Mexican Service Medal	World War I Victory Medal with Submarine Clasp
3rd Row	China Service Medal	American Defense Service Medal with Fleet Clasp	American Campaign Medal
4th Row	Asiatic-Pacific Campaign Medal with one service star	World War II Victory Medal	Knight Grand Cross of the Order of Orange-Nassau with Swords

== See also ==
- List of superintendents of the United States Naval Academy
- List of United States senators from Connecticut

Military offices
Preceded by Samuel S. Robison	Superintendent of United States Naval Academy; 1931–1934	Succeeded by David F. Sellers
Preceded by Harry E. Yarnell	Commander-in-Chief, United States Asiatic Fleet; July 25, 1939 – February 14, 1942	Succeeded by none
U.S. Senate
Preceded by Francis Maloney	U.S. senator (Class 1) from Connecticut; February 15, 1945 – November 5, 1946; Served alongside: Brien McMahon	Succeeded by Raymond Baldwin
