= List of ship launches in 1914 =

The list of ship launches in 1914 includes a chronological list of some ships launched in 1914.

Date	Ship	Class / type	Builder	Location	Navy/Country	Notes
16 January	Agapenor	Cargo ship	Scotts Shipbuilding and Engineering Company	Greenock	United Kingdom	For Ocean Steam Ship Company. 7550 Gross Tons
17 January	Szent István	Tegetthoff-class battleship	Ganz-Danubius	Fiume	Austria-Hungary	For Austro-Hungarian Navy
29 January	Euripides	Passenger ship	Harland & Wolff	Belfast	United Kingdom	For Aberdeen Line.
29 January	V25	V25-class torpedo boat	AG Vulcan	Stettin	Germany	For Kaiserliche Marine.
7 February	Landrail	Laforey-class destroyer	Yarrow	Scotstoun	United Kingdom	For Royal Navy.
11 February	Mississippi	Passenger ship	Harland & Wolff	Belfast	United Kingdom	For Atlantic Transport Co.
11 February	Asie	Ocean liner	Ateliers et Chantiers de France	Dunkirk	France	For Cie. des Chargeurs Réunis
21 February	Kronprinz Wilhelm	König-class battleship	Germaniawerft	Kiel	Germany	For Imperial German navy
21 February	V26	V25-class torpedo boat	AG Vulcan	Stettin	Germany	For Imperial German Navy.
24 February	Fritz	diesel motor ship	Blohm & Voss	Hamburg	Germany	
25 February	Lance	Laforey-class destroyer	John I. Thornycroft & Company		United Kingdom	For Royal Navy
26 February	Britannic	Olympic-class ocean liner	Harland and Wolff	Belfast	United Kingdom	For Royal Navy; Sister ship of Titanic
26 February	Lydiard	Laforey-class destroyer	Hawthorn Leslie		United Kingdom	For Royal Navy
28 February	S32	V25-class torpedo boat	Schichau-Werke	Elbing	Germany	For Imperial German Navy.
12 March	Aydon	Cargo ship	Blyth Shipbuilding & Dry Docks Co. Ltd	Blyth	United Kingdom	For Aydon Steamship Co. Ltd.
12 March	Falstria	Cargo ship	Harland & Wolff	Belfast	United Kingdom	For East Asiatic CoEast Asiatic Co.
14 March	K-3	K-class submarine	Union Iron Works	San Francisco, California	United States	For United States Navy
17 March	K-5	K-class submarine	Fore River Shipyard	Quincy, Massachusetts	United States	For United States Navy
19 March	K-4	K-class submarine	Moran Company	Seattle, Washington	United States	For United States Navy
23 March	Oklahoma	Nevada-class battleship	New York Shipbuilding	Camden, New Jersey	United States	For United States Navy
26 March	K-6	K-class submarine	Fore River Shipyard	Quincy, Massachusetts	United States	For United States Navy
26 March	V27	V25-class torpedo boat	AG Vulcan	Stettin	Germany	For Kaiserliche Marine.
4 April	S33	V25-class torpedo boat	Schichau-Werke	Elbing	Germany	For Imperial German Navy.
8 April	Pengreep	Cargo ship	Irvine's Shipbuilding and Drydock Co Ltd	West Hartlepool, Co Durham	United Kingdom	For R B Chellew Steam Navigation Company
22 April	Egori	Cargo ship	Harland & Wolff	Belfast	United Kingdom	For Elder Dempster.
22 April	McDougal	O'Brien-class destroyer	Bath Iron Works	Bath, Maine	United States	For United States Navy
23 April	E11	E-class submarine			United Kingdom	For Royal Navy
25 April	Regensburg	Graudenz-class cruiser	AG Weser	Bremen	Germany	For Imperial German Navy
30 April	Massilia	Ocean liner	Forges et Chantiers de la Méditerranée	La Seyne	France	For Cie. de Navigation Sud Atlantique
9 May	Néréide	Submarine	Arsenal de Cherbourg	Cherbourg	France	For French Navy
11 May	Kingsholm	Tug	I. J. Abdela & Mitchell Ltd.	Queensferry	United Kingdom	For W. M. Butler & Co (Bristol) Ltd.
9 June	Amphitrite	Amphitrite-class submarine	Arsenal de Rochefort	Rochefort	France	For French Navy
13 June	S34	V25-class torpedo boat	Schichau-Werke	Elbing	Germany	For Imperial German Navy.
20 June	K-7	K-class submarine	Union Iron Works	San Francisco, California	United States	For United States Navy
20 June	United States	Seattle Construction and Drydock Company	Seattle, Washington	Arapaho	tug	For United States Navy
20 June	Bismarck	Imperator-class ocean liner	Blohm + Voss	Hamburg	Germany	For Hamburg America Line
24 June	Princess Margaret	Passenger liner	William Denny	Dunbarton	United Kingdom	For Canadian Pacific Railway
7 July	Orbita	Ocean liner	Harland & Wolff	Belfast	United Kingdom	For Pacific Steam Navigation Company
9 June	Bellone	Bellone-class submarine	Arsenal de Rochefort	Rochefort	France	For French Navy
9 July	Lalandia	Cargo ship	Harland & Wolff	Belfast	United Kingdom	For Western Australian Government, completed as Kangaroo.
9 July	Statendam	Ocean Liner	Harland & Wolff	Belfast	United Kingdom	For Holland America Line
11 July	K-8	K-class submarine	Union Iron Works	San Francisco, California	United States	For United States Navy
11 July	Nevada	Nevada-class battleship	Fore River Shipyard	Quincy, Massachusetts	United States	For United States Navy
20 July	O'Brien	O'Brien-class destroyer	William Cramp & Sons	Philadelphia, Pennsylvania	United States	For United States Navy
20 July	United States	Seattle Construction and Drydock Company	Seattle, Washington	Mohave	tug	For United States Navy (or 20 June)
3 August	Providence	Ocean liner	Forges et Chantiers de la Méditerranée	La Seyne	France	For Cie. Française de Navigation à Vapeur
6 August	Murray	Admiralty M-class destroyer	Palmers Shipbuilding & Iron Company	Hebburn, Tyneside	United Kingdom	For Royal Navy.
8 August	Bjørgvin	Nidaros-class coastal defence ship	Armstrong Whitworth	Elswick, Tyne and Wear	United Kingdom	For Royal Norwegian Navy
15 August	United States	Seattle Construction and Drydock Company	Seattle, Washington	Tillamook	tug	For United States Navy
19 August	Nicholson	O'Brien-class destroyer	William Cramp & Sons	Philadelphia, Pennsylvania	United States	For United States Navy
22 August	Ericsson	O'Brien-class destroyer	New York Shipbuilding	Camden, New Jersey	United States	For United States Navy
4 September	Tuscania	Passenger liner	Alexander Stephen and Sons	Linthouse, Govan	United Kingdom	For Anchor Line
5 September	Ark Royal	Seaplane carrier	Blyth Shipbuilding & Dry Docks Co. Ltd	Blyth	United Kingdom	For Royal Navy.
5 September	Ariane	Amphitrite-class submarine	Arsenal de Cherbourg	Cherbourg	France	For French Navy
8 September	Ebro	Ocean Liner	Workman, Clark and Company	Belfast	United Kingdom	For Royal Mail Steam Packet Company
21 September	Jaime I	España-class battleship	SECN	Ferrol	Spain	For Spanish Navy.
24 September	Cadarso	Bustamante-class destroyer	SECN	Cartagena	Spain	For Spanish Navy
30 September	Apapa	Passenger ship	Harland & Wolff	Glasgow	United Kingdom	For Elder Dempster Line.
12 October	Manly	Yarrow M-class destroyer	Yarrow	Scotstoun	United Kingdom	
20 October	Princess Irene	Ocean liner	William Denny and Brothers Ltd	Dumbarton, Scotland	United Kingdom	For Canadian Pacific Railway
31 October	Barham	Queen Elizabeth-class battleship	John Brown & Company	Clydebank, Scotland	United Kingdom	For Royal Navy
4 November	Valiant	Queen Elizabeth-class battleship	Fairfield Shipbuilding	Govan, Scotland	United Kingdom	For Royal Navy
17 November	Royal Oak	Revenge-class battleship	Devonport Dockyard	Devonport, England	United Kingdom	For Royal Navy
19 November	Almanzora	Passenger ship	Harland & Wolff	Belfast	United Kingdom	For Royal Mail Line.
21 November	Elbing	Pillau-class light cruiser	Schichau-Werke	Danzig	Germany	For Kaiserliche Marine
19 December	Huon	River-class torpedo-boat destroyer	Cockatoo Dockyard	Sydney, New South Wales	Australia	For Royal Australian Navy
31 December	Belgenland	Passenger ship	Harland & Wolff	Belfast	United Kingdom	For International Navigation Co. Completed as Belgic.
3rd Quarter	Sir William	Coaster	I. J. Abdela & Mitchell Ltd.	Queensferry	United Kingdom	For John H. Vernon.
Unknown date	Baychimo	Cargo ship			Sweden	For Hudson's Bay Company
Unknown date	Egba	Cargo ship	Harland & Wolff LTd.	Glasgow	United Kingdom	For Elder Dempster Lines.
Unknown date	Eskburn	Steam drifter	Beeching Brothers Ltd.	Great Yarmouth	United Kingdom	For Robert Milburn.
Unknown date	Glen Usk	Paddle steamer	Ailsa Shipbuilding Co Ltd.	Troon	United Kingdom	For P. & A. Campbell.
Unknown date	Maricopa	Tanker	Palmers Ltd.	River Tyne	United Kingdom	For private owner.
Unknown date	Ocean Emperor	Steam drifter	Beeching Brothers Ltd.	Great Yarmouth	United Kingdom	For Bloomfields Ltd.
Unknown date	Pacific	Cargo ship	Fore River Shipyard	Quincy, Massachusetts	United States	For J S Emery Steamship Co
Unknown date	Skylark	Motor vessel	J. Allen & Co.	Poole	United Kingdom	For Jake Bolson.
Unknown date	The Flame	Motor lighter	Frederick Braby & Co. Ltd.	Deptford	United Kingdom	For London Motor Lighterage Co. Ltd.
Unknown date	Viking II	Whaler	Kaldnes Mekaniske Verksted	Tønsberg	Norway	For A/S Tønsberg Hvalfangeri
Unknown date	War Ermine	Cargo ship	Joseph Russell & Co.	Port Glasgow	United Kingdom	For British Shipping Controller.
Unknown date	7 G.W.R.	Barge	I. J. Abdela & Mitchell Ltd.	Queensferry	United Kingdom	For Great Western Railway.
Unknown date	8 G.W.R.	Barge	I. J. Abdela & Mitchell Ltd.	Queensferry	United Kingdom	For Great Western Railway.
Unknown date	9 G.W.R.	Barge	I. J. Abdela & Mitchell Ltd.	Queensferry	United Kingdom	For Great Western Railway.
Unknown date	10 G.W.R.	Barge	I. J. Abdela & Mitchell Ltd.	Queensferry	United Kingdom	For Great Western Railway.
Unknown date	11 G.W.R.	Barge	I. J. Abdela & Mitchell Ltd.	Queensferry	United Kingdom	For Great Western Railway.
Unknown date	12 G.W.R.	Barge	I. J. Abdela & Mitchell Ltd.	Queensferry	United Kingdom	For Great Western Railway.
Unknown date	Unnamed	Sailing ship	I. J. Abdela & Mitchell Ltd.	Queensferry	United Kingdom	For private owner.
Unknown date	Unnamed	Sailing ship	I. J. Abdela & Mitchell Ltd.	Queensferry	United Kingdom	For private owner.
Unknown date	Unnamed	Sailing ship	I. J. Abdela & Mitchell Ltd.	Queensferry	United Kingdom	For private owner.
Unknown date	Unnamed	Sailing ship	I. J. Abdela & Mitchell Ltd.	Queensferry	United Kingdom	For private owner.
Unknown date	Unnamed	Sailing ship	I. J. Abdela & Mitchell Ltd.	Queensferry	United Kingdom	For private owner.
Unknown date	Unnamed	Sailing ship	I. J. Abdela & Mitchell Ltd.	Queensferry	United Kingdom	For private owner.
