= USS K-8 =

K-class submarine of the United States

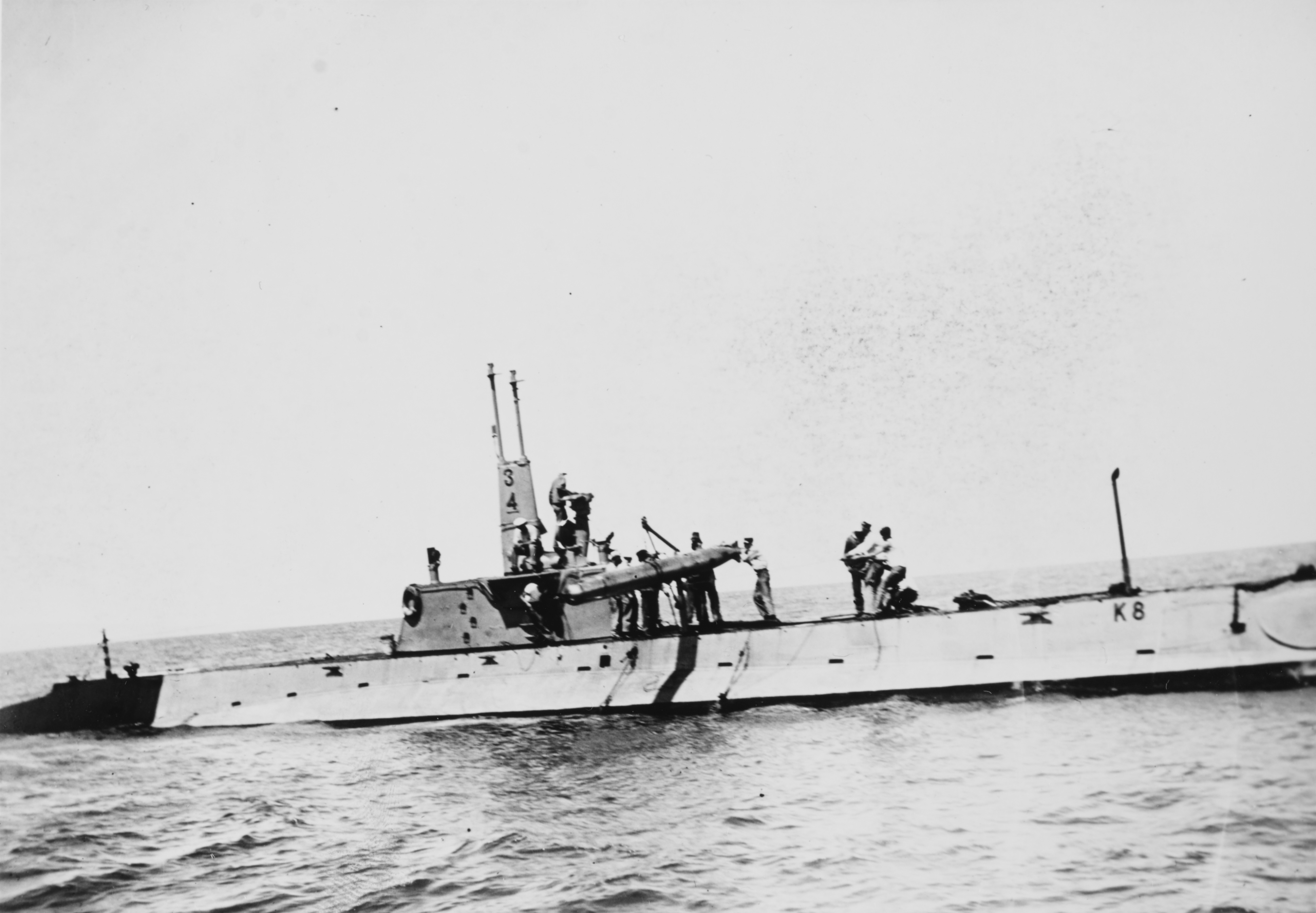
- USS K-8 recovering a torpedo, c. 1915, while serving on the Pacific Coast

History

United States
- Name: K-8
- Builder: Union Iron Works, San Francisco, California
- Cost: $574,561.25 (hull and machinery)
- Laid down: 10 May 1912
- Launched: 11 July 1914
- Sponsored by: Mrs. John W. Lewis
- Commissioned: 1 December 1914
- Decommissioned: 24 February 1923
- Stricken: 18 December 1930
- Identification: Hull symbol: SS-39 (17 July 1920); Call sign: NYM
- Fate: Sold for scrapping, 3 June 1931

General characteristics
- Class & type: K-class submarine
- Displacement: 392 long tons (398 t) surfaced; 521 long tons (529 t) submerged
- Length: 153 ft 7 in (46.81 m)
- Beam: 16 ft 8 in (5.08 m)
- Draft: 13 ft 1 in (3.99 m)
- Installed power: 950 hp (710 kW) (diesel engines); 340 hp (250 kW) (electric motors)
- Propulsion: 2 × NELSECO diesel engines; 2 × Electro Dynamic electric motors; 2 × 60-cell batteries; 2 × Propellers
- Speed: 14 kn (26 km/h; 16 mph) surfaced; 10.5 kn (19.4 km/h; 12.1 mph) submerged
- Range: 4,500 nmi (8,300 km; 5,200 mi) at 10 kn (19 km/h; 12 mph) surfaced; 120 nmi (220 km; 140 mi) at 5 kn (9.3 km/h; 5.8 mph) submerged
- Test depth: 200 ft (61 m)
- Capacity: 18,126 US gal (68,610 L; 15,093 imp gal) fuel
- Complement: 2 officers; 26 enlisted
- Armament: 4 × 18 inch (450 mm) bow torpedo tubes (8 torpedoes)

USS K-8 (SS-39), also known as "Submarine No. 39", was a K-class submarine of the United States Navy(USN). She patrolled in the Gulf of Mexico, during WWI.

== Design ==
The K-class boats had a length of 153 ft 7 in (46.8 m), a beam of 16 ft 8 in (5.1 m), and a mean draft of 13 ft 1 in (4.0 m). They displaced 451 long tons (458 t), on the surface, and 527 long tons (535 t) submerged. They had a diving depth of 200 feet (61.0 m). The K-class submarines had a crew of 2 officers and 26 enlisted men.

For surface running, the boats were powered by two 475-brake-horsepower (354 kW) NELSECO diesel engines, each driving one propeller shaft. When submerged each propeller was driven by a 170-horsepower (127 kW) electric motor. They could reach 14 kn (26 km/h; 16 mph) on the surface and 10.5 kn (19.4 km/h; 12.1 mph) underwater. On the surface, the boats had a range of 3,150 nmi (5,830 km; 3,620 mi) at 11 kn (20 km/h; 13 mph) and 120 nmi (220 km; 140 mi) at 5 knots (9.3 km/h; 5.8 mph) submerged.

The K-class submarines were armed with four 18 inch (450 mm) torpedo tubes in the bow. They carried four reloads, for a total of eight torpedoes.

== Construction ==
K-8's keel was laid down, on 10 May 1912, by the Union Iron Works, in San Francisco, California, under a subcontract from Electric Boat Company, of Groton, Connecticut. She was launched on 11 July 1914, sponsored by Mrs. John W. Lewis, wife of the first commanding officer, and commissioned on 1 December 1914, at the Mare Island Navy Yard.

== Service history ==
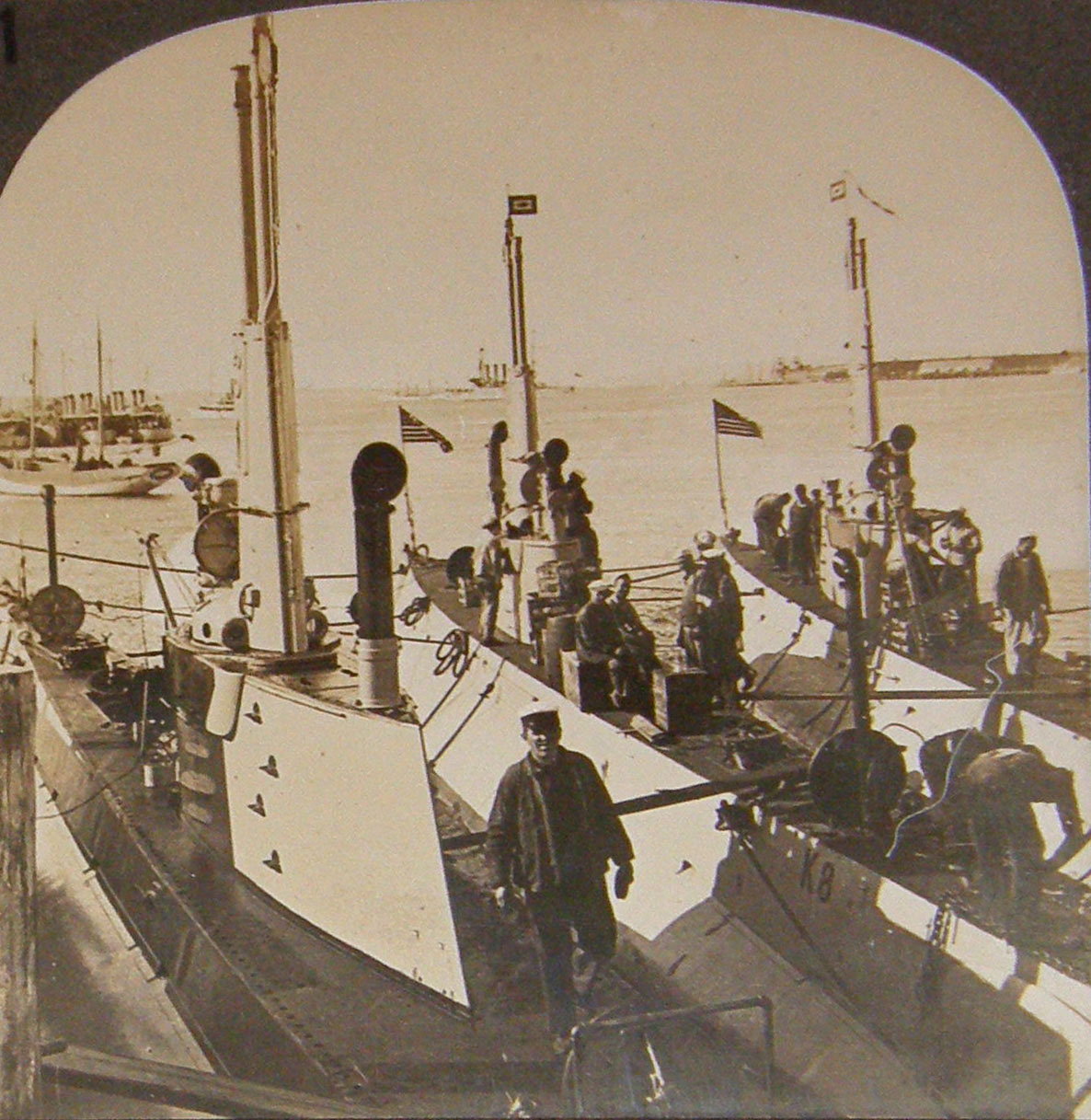
USS K-8, middle, and two other early subs in San Diego, during World War I

K-8 departed San Francisco, on 26 December, with K-7 for training operations along the coast of southern California. Returning to Mare Island, on 4 June 1915, she sailed on 3 October, for duty in the Hawaiian Islands, arriving at Pearl Harbor, on 14 October. For more than two years she operated with K-3, K-4, and K-7, developing and perfecting submarine techniques in diving, torpedo firing, and underwater tactics. Ordered to return to the West Coast, on 31 October 1917, she arrived in San Pedro, California, on 12 November, and proceeded on 27 November, for patrol duty out of Key West, Florida.

Arriving at Key West, 8 January 1918, she conducted patrols from Key West, to Galveston, Texas, during the remaining months of World War I. Departing Galveston, on 21 November, she returned to Key West, to continue experimental operations along the Florida coast, until she sailed for Philadelphia, Pennsylvania, on 14 April 1919. Arriving on 21 April, K-8 underwent overhaul before sailing on 10 November, for Key West. Upon arrival on 3 December, she began seven months of operations in the Caribbean Sea.

After returning to Philadelphia, on 8 June 1920, she proceeded to Annapolis, Maryland, on 19 January 1921, for training operations at the United States Naval Academy. Steaming to Hampton Roads, Virginia, on 15 February, she continued development operations along the Atlantic coast, from Norfolk, Virginia, to Cape Cod, returning to Annapolis, on 4 April through 14 April 1921, and visiting the United States Military Academy at West Point, New York, from 24 May through 30 May. She conducted experimental maneuvers in the Chesapeake Bay, from 4 December 1921 to 16 May 1922; trained students out of New London, Connecticut, from 20 May to 5 September 1922; and returned to Hampton Roads, on 7 September, to resume operations in the lower Chesapeake Bay.

== Fate ==
K-8 decommissioned at Norfolk, on 24 February 1923. She was towed to the Philadelphia Navy Yard, on 2 September 1924. Stricken from the Navy Register, on 18 December 1930, she was sold for scrapping on 25 June 1931.

== Bibliography ==
- "Table 21 - Ships on Navy List June 30, 1919". Congressional Serial Set. U.S. Government Printing Office: 767. 1921.
- Priolo, Gary. "K-8 (SS-39)". Navsource.net.
- Friedman, Norman (1995). U.S. Submarines Through 1945: An Illustrated Design History. Annapolis, Maryland: Naval Institute Press. ISBN 1-55750-263-3.
- Gardiner, Robert & Gray, Randal (1985). Conway's All the World's Fighting Ships 1906–1921. Annapolis, Maryland: Naval Institute Press. ISBN 0-85177-245-5.
- Cressman, Robert J. (9 July 2024). "K-7 (Submarine No. 38)". Dictionary of American Naval Fighting Ships. Navy Department, Naval History and Heritage Command. This article incorporates text from this source, which is in the public domain.
