= USS K-5 =

K-class submarine of the United States

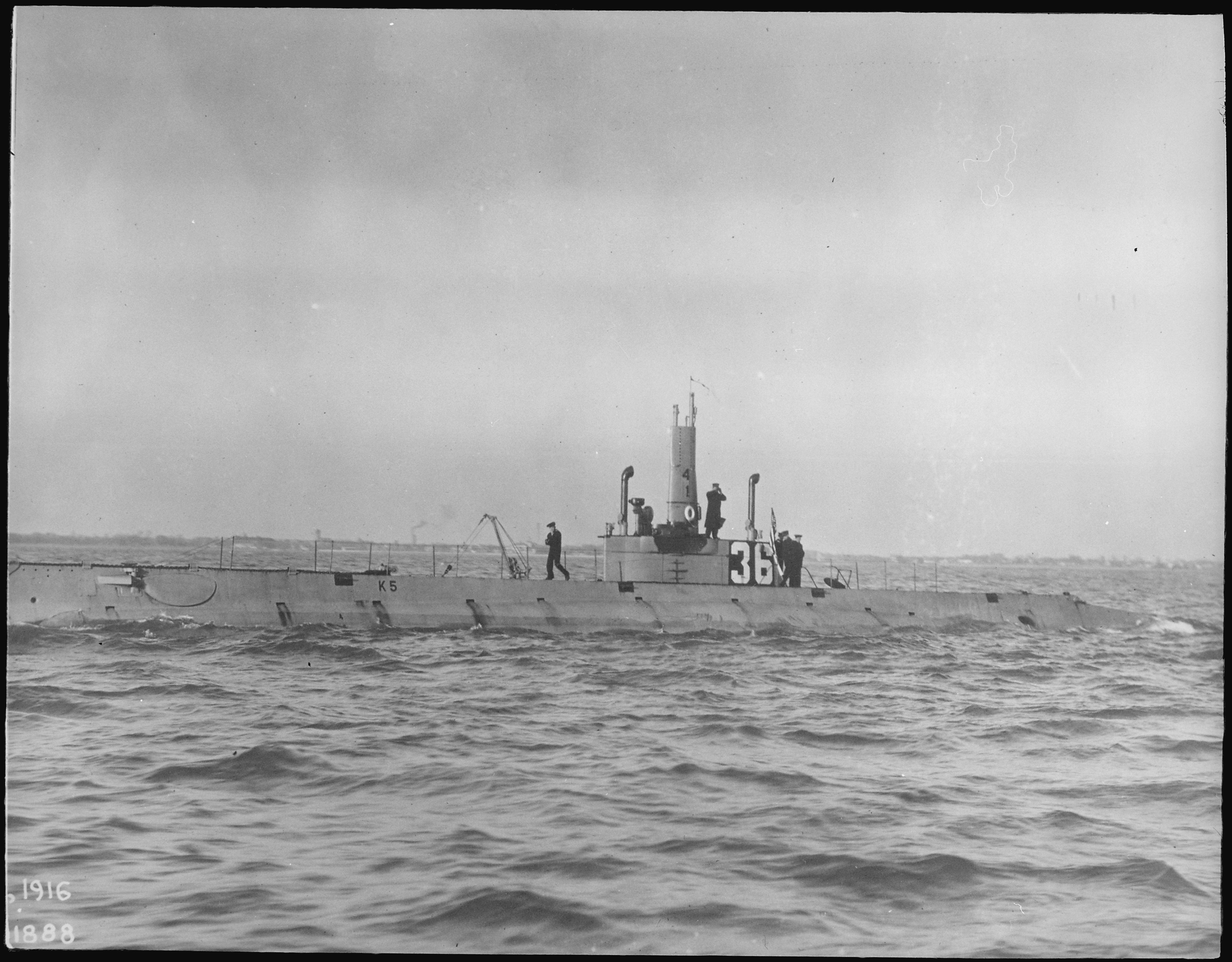
- USS K-5 in Hampton Roads, Virginia, 13 December 1916

History

United States
- Name: K-5
- Builder: Fore River Shipyard, Quincy, Massachusetts
- Cost: $483,176.90 (hull and machinery)
- Laid down: 10 June 1912
- Launched: 17 March 1914
- Sponsored by: Mrs. Julie Child
- Commissioned: 22 August 1914
- Decommissioned: 20 February 1923
- Stricken: 18 December 1930
- Identification: Hull symbol: SS-36 (17 July 1920); Call sign: NYJ
- Fate: Sold for scrapping, 3 June 1931

General characteristics
- Class & type: K-class submarine
- Displacement: 392 long tons (398 t) surfaced; 521 long tons (529 t) submerged
- Length: 153 ft 7 in (46.81 m)
- Beam: 16 ft 8 in (5.08 m)
- Draft: 13 ft 1 in (3.99 m)
- Installed power: 950 hp (710 kW) (diesel engines); 340 hp (250 kW) (electric motors)
- Propulsion: 2 × NELSECO diesel engines; 2 × Electro Dynamic electric motors; 2 × 60-cell batteries; 2 × Propellers
- Speed: 14 kn (26 km/h; 16 mph) surfaced; 10.5 kn (19.4 km/h; 12.1 mph) submerged
- Range: 4,500 nmi (8,300 km; 5,200 mi) at 10 kn (19 km/h; 12 mph) surfaced; 120 nmi (220 km; 140 mi) at 5 kn (9.3 km/h; 5.8 mph) submerged
- Test depth: 200 ft (61 m)
- Capacity: 18,126 US gal (68,610 L; 15,093 imp gal) fuel
- Complement: 2 officers; 26 enlisted
- Armament: 4 × 18 inch (450 mm) bow torpedo tubes (8 torpedoes)

USS K-5 (SS-36), also known as "Submarine No. 36", was a K-class submarine of the United States Navy (USN). She patrolled off the Azores, during WWI.

== Design ==
The K-class boats had a length of 153 ft 7 in (46.8 m), a beam of 16 ft 8 in (5.1 m), and a mean draft of 13 ft 1 in (4.0 m). They displaced 451 long tons (458 t), on the surface, and 527 long tons (535 t) submerged. They had a diving depth of 200 feet (61.0 m). The K-class submarines had a crew of 2 officers and 26 enlisted men.

For surface running, the boats were powered by two 475-brake-horsepower (354 kW) NELSECO diesel engines, each driving one propeller shaft. When submerged each propeller was driven by a 170-horsepower (127 kW) electric motor. They could reach 14 kn (26 km/h; 16 mph) on the surface and 10.5 kn (19.4 km/h; 12.1 mph) underwater. On the surface, the boats had a range of 3,150 nmi (5,830 km; 3,620 mi) at 11 kn (20 km/h; 13 mph) and 120 nmi (220 km; 140 mi) at 5 knots (9.3 km/h; 5.8 mph) submerged.

The K-class submarines were armed with four 18 inch (450 mm) torpedo tubes in the bow. They carried four reloads, for a total of eight torpedoes.

== Construction ==
K-5's keel was laid down on 10 June 1912, by the Fore River Shipbuilding Company, in Quincy, Massachusetts, under a subcontract from the Electric Boat Company, of Groton, Connecticut. She was launched on 17 March 1914, sponsored by Mrs. Julie Child, and commissioned on 22 August 1914.

== Service history ==
=== 1914 ===
K-5 received orders assigning her to the Submarine Flotilla, Atlantic Fleet, on 14 September 1914. Those orders were amended on 9 October, when she received orders assigning her to the newly-organized Fourth Division, Submarine Flotilla, Atlantic Fleet. The submarine departed the Boston Navy Yard, on 16 November. Initially, bound for the Torpedo Station, at Newport, Rhode Island, she arrived later that day and then departed on 19 November, for the Submarine Base, New London, Connecticut, where she joined the Fourth Division. She cleared the base on 8 December, to cruise and conduct trials. Returning to base on 10 December, she departed the following day and proceeded to the New York Navy Yard, Brooklyn, New York. Arriving on 11 December, she entered dry dock and underwent maintenance into 1915.

=== 1915 ===
K-5 cleared the New York Navy Yard, on 19 January 1915, and arrived at Charleston, South Carolina, on 23 January. Getting underway again the boat proceeded to Key West and Tampa, in advance of reaching Pensacola, Florida, on 9 February. There she conducted training with the other boats of her class until 25 April. Departing the Gulf Coast on that day, she proceeded via Key West, to the North River anchorage in the Hudson River, off New York. She then went to sea for maneuvers enroute to Newport, where she arrived on 27 May. She operated in the waters of Narragansett Bay until 20 June, when she sortied from Newport, and reached the New York Navy Yard, where she docked for overhaul the following day. The submarine remained at the yard until 2 October, when she undocked and cleared for Newport. Arriving at her destination the next day, she departed on 4 October, for maneuvers and training. Returning to Newport, 31 October, she proceeded back into the New York Navy Yard. Reaching on 1 November, she remained there through the year's end.

=== 1916 ===
K-5 resumed operations underway on 27 January 1916, when she cleared the New York Navy Yard, bound for a return to Southern waters. Again proceeding via Key West and Tampa, the submarine arrived at Pensacola, on 16 February, to conduct training submariners with the fellow boats of the flotilla. This included diving drills, underwater maneuvers, and torpedo firing practice. With training completed, she departed Pensacola, on 26 April, and proceeded via Key West and Hampton Roads, Virginia, to the New York Navy Yard. Arriving on 14 May, she remained there undergoing overhaul until 3 August.

With her yard work completed, K-5 cleared for New London, where she reached on 4 August 1916. After four days conducting submerged training, she sortied on 8 August, for Great Salt Pond, Rhode Island, to conduct maneuvers with the Atlantic Fleet before returning to New London, for oscillator tests. She then continued on to Melville Station, Rhode Island, and Newport, to refuel and to obtain lubricating oil. She then returned to her station at New London, until 21 August, before sortieing to conduct strategic maneuvers off Cold Spring Inlet, New Jersey, and Block Island, Rhode Island, until 27 August. She then returned to Cold Spring Inlet, whence she operated for training from 28 August–12 September, with the exception of her time refueling at the Philadelphia Navy Yard, from 1–3 September.

After a time in port at Philadelphia, K-5 conducted engineering performance runs off New London, before conducting a series of torpedo practices in the waters of the Long Island Sound, from 20 September–11 October. Afterward, she returned to New London, on 11 October, to conduct crew training until 31 October. The boat then proceeded in to the New York Navy Yard, on 1 November, and underwent overhaul until clearing on 3 December. The boat transited to Hampton Roads, where she took on supplies and underwent further repairs.

=== 1917 ===
Departing on 16 December 1916, she proceeded to Charleston, where she anchored for the night, in advance of continuing on to Key West. Reaching on 22 December. The submarine remained there over the next month conducting submerged training to 22 January 1917. K-5 then shifted to Dry Tortugas, Florida, to conduct torpedo proving practice before cruising based from Key West. The boat then proceeded to Tampa, for liberty and recruiting duty from 5–11 February, prior to arriving at Pensacola, on 12 February, and conducting tactical training until February 17. She then shifted to Mobile, Alabama, for liberty, before returning to Pensacola, to conduct submerged training and tactical problems with the other boats of the Submarine Force, until 27 March.

As K-5 conducted her training, relations between the US and Imperial Germany became strained pursuant to the latter's resumption of its unrestricted submarine warfare campaign on 1 February 1917. As a result, Atlantic Fleet assets were being consolidated along the East Coast in the anticipation of the outbreak of war. The submarine made her return to Hampton Roads, via Key West, on 5 April. The following day, 6 April, the US declared war on Germany. The submarine refueled at the Norfolk Navy Yard, Portsmouth, Virginia, from 6–8 April, before returning to Hampton Roads. Sailing on 8 April, she set a northerly course and stood in to the New York Navy Yard. She then proceeded to New London, Base No. 22, to conduct crew training until 8 May, then shifted from the yard to Gravesend Bay, New York, with Bushnell, where they anchored overnight. Departing on 10 May, she proceeded to Philadelphia, where she entered the yard for overhaul on May 11. This preparation for distant service continued until 7 October.

While K-5 underwent overhaul, Vice Admiral William S. Sims, Commander, US Naval Forces in European Waters, in June 1917, cited British success in using submarines as submarine hunter-killers in antisubmarine warfare (ASW). The Allied submarines, with their lower profiles, could approach U-boats more stealthily than larger surface patrol vessels. On 2 July, Admiral William S. Benson, Chief of Naval Operations, ordered the twelve most suitable submarines on the Atlantic coast be fitted out for duty in European waters. K-5 was selected for this duty and was fitted out for distant service. K-5 completed her pre-deployment refit and cleared the Philadelphia Navy Yard, on 7 October 1917. Proceeding to the Submarine Base, at New London. Arriving on 8 October 1917, she continued to prepare for service in the "war zone".

K-5 departed New London, proceeding down the Thames River, on 12 October 1917, in company with Bushnell, K-1, K-2, and K-6. Passing through the Cape Cod Canal and the vessels rendezvoused with the protected cruiser Chicago, flagship Submarine Force, Atlantic Fleet, at Provincetown, Massachusetts. The force stopped at Halifax, Nova Scotia, enroute to the Azores, where it arrived at Ponta Delgada, Base No. 13, on October 27. K-5 received orders to operate from Ponta Delgada, and conduct patrol cruises off the Azores, in conjunction with her sister K-boats and the yet to arrive E-1. These boats were designated the Fourth Division, Submarine Flotilla, Atlantic Fleet, while the L-boats, based in Ireland, were designated the Fifth Division.

K-5 sortied from Ponta Delgada, at 17:00, on 8 November 1917, to conduct her first ASW patrol. Ten days hence, on 27 November, the submarine's commanding officer interviewed survivors of vessels sunk or captured by U-151, to gain intelligence on the enemy operating off Santa Maria Island. The submarine then conducted her second patrol with negative enemy contact and returned to Ponta Delgada. She remained in port through Christmas and returned to her patrolling duties on 28 December. She patrolled through the new year’s holidays and made her return on 3 January 1918.

=== 1918 ===
K-5 continued this routine of patrols, interspersed with refit, refuel, and rest, into the Spring of 1918. Her patrol cruises in Azorean waters were to protect shipping and to deny the use of the Portuguese archipelago as a base for U-boats, or as a haven for German surface raiders, interspersed with periods of refit, repairs, and replenishment. On 1 April 1918, while in the harbor at Ponta Delgada, the submarine suffered an explosion of her after storage battery. This prompted the convening of a board of investigation that concluded that while the crew did vent as directed, they did so improperly, thus producing the gases that exploded. As a result of this incident, K-5 received orders to return to the US.

K-5 departed the Azores on 18 April 1918, in company with Choctaw, a mine carrier assigned to the Naval Overseas Transportation Service. They transited home via Bermuda and Hampton Roads, before arriving at the Philadelphia Navy Yard, on 16 May, for repairs, overhaul, and replacement of her after storage battery. Upon the completion of her yard work, she proceeded to New London, escorted by the patrol vessel Itasca II, on 27 September. She was dispatched from New London to Newport, on 15 October, to receive and prove torpedoes at the Torpedo Station. She arrived back at New London, on October 25. K-5, on 2 November, received orders to proceed to Bermuda, in company with M-1, and Helvetia, for distant service. With the Armistice of 11 November 1918 ending the war, however, those orders were cancelled.

=== 1919-1922 ===
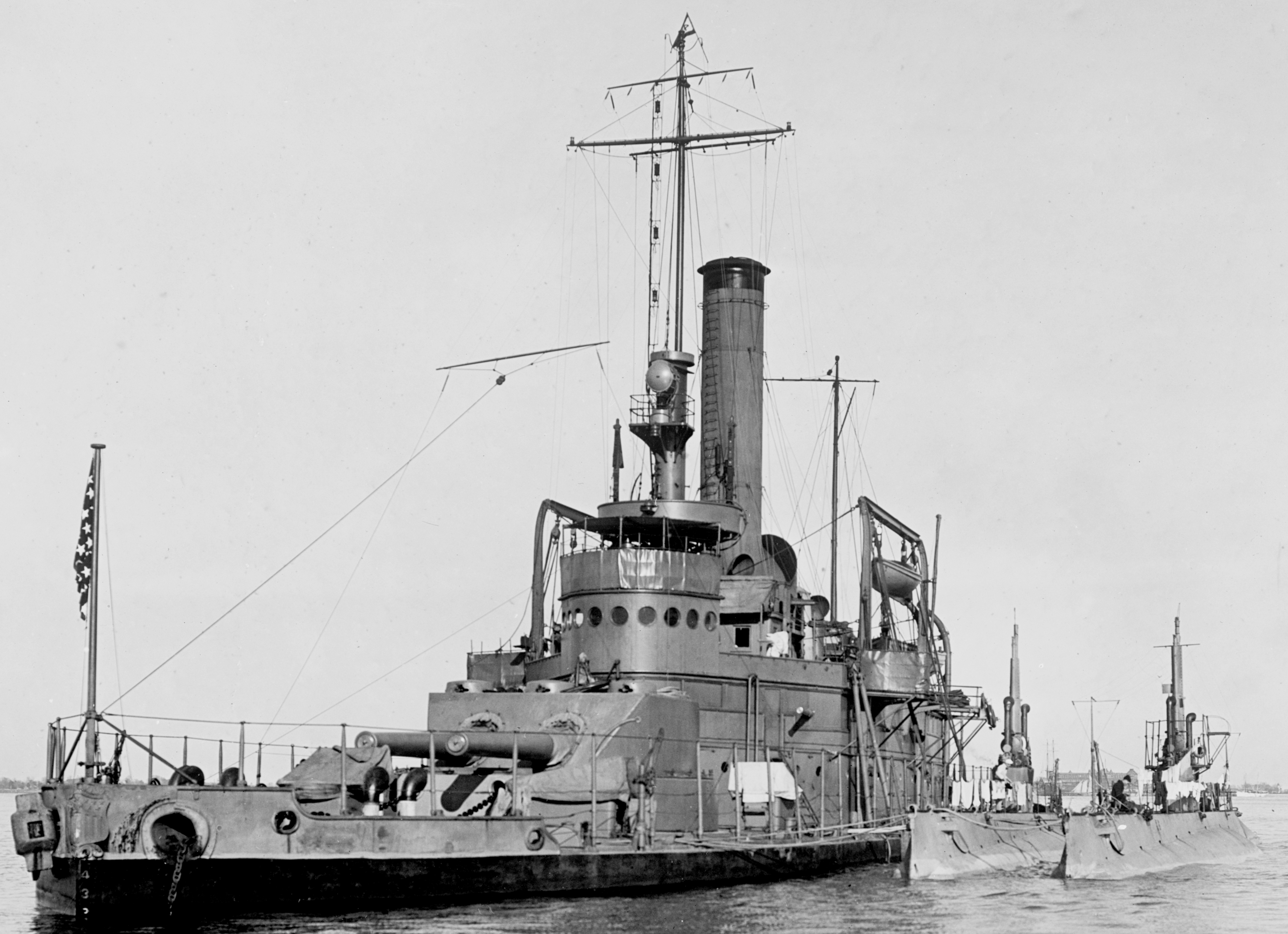
Tallahassee tending to K-5 and K-6, in Hampton Roads, 1919

K-5 received orders on 23 December 1918, directing the submarine to proceed in company with O-1, to Key West, via Charleston. Both departed New London, on 7 January 1919. Having reached Charleston, on 11 January, K-5 parted company and continued on to Key West. After her arrival on 13 January, she underwent repairs which were completed on 22 January. K-5, three submarine chasers, and three seaplanes, with the destroyer Isabel serving as a tender, sortied from Key West, bound for a recruiting tour up the Mississippi River. Touching at Pensacola, on 21 May, they moved onto New Orleans, Loiusiana, 22 May; Natchez, Mississippi, 30 May; St. Louis, Missouri, 13 June; Cairo, Illinois, 22 June; Helena, Arkansas, 2 July; Vicksburg, 6 July; Natchez, Mississippi, 11 July; Baton Rouge, 14 July; Plaquemine, 18 July; Donaldsonville, Louisiana, 19 July; and returned to New Orleans, with Isabel, which remained at the New Orleans Navy Yard, on 1 August. Meanwhile, K-5 proceeded on to Gulfport, Mississippi, then departed on 27 July 1919, for operations between Key West and Havana, Cuba.

K-5 later returned to Key West, where she collided with the tug John L. Lawrence, on 12 September. Both were reported as uninjured, but K-5 docked at Key West, for construction on 15 November. The boat departed Key West, for Philadelphia, on 12 June 1920, arriving on June 17, for overhaul. She then received orders on 21 June, re-assigning the homeport of her division, Submarine Division Three, from Key West, to Philadelphia. Four days later, on June 25, that division was placed into an inactive status and on 7 July, all the submarines in the division were made available for all authorized yard work. While in this status on 17 July, K-5 was designated SS-36 as part of a Navy-wide administrative reorganization. The division then received orders on 20 July, assigning them to the First Naval District, to be based at Squantum, Massachusetts, upon the completion of their yard work at Philadelphia. That assignment was subsequently changed on 15 January 1921, when she and the other K-boats were assigned to Submarine Base, Hampton Roads. In furtherance of these orders, the submarines were also reassigned from Division Three to Division Five.

With her repairs completed, K-5 sailed to Hampton Roads, on 5 March 1921. On 9 May 1921, she received orders assigning her to the Special Submarine Squadron, effective 15 May. During the following months, K-5 and the other submarines of the squadron conducted numerous experiments and maneuvers to improve the operational and tactical abilities of the submarine in the waters off New England, and in the Chesapeake Bay. On 21 July, the submarine was forced to enter the Boston Navy Yard, to undergo urgent repairs to her main motor. On 2 December, her assignment, as well as that of the other K-boats, to the Special Submarine Squadron was cancelled, and she reverted to her previous assignment in Division Five.

With orders dated 27 January 1922, K-5 and the other boats of Division Five, reported to Commander, Submarine Base, New London. While underway on 18 March, K-5 crossed astern in too close a proximity to the Bartlett Reef Light Vessel, and dragged across the latter's moorings. Following diving trials off Cape Cod, K-5 arrived at Hampton Roads, on 7 September 1922.

== Fate ==
K-5 continued operations in the Chesapeake Bay, then decommissioned at Submarine Base, Hampton Roads, on 20 February 1923. Taken in tow to Philadelphia, on 13 November 1924, she was stricken from the Navy Register on 18 December 1930, and was later sold for scrapping, on 3 June 1931.

== Bibliography ==
- "Table 21 - Ships on Navy List June 30, 1919". Congressional Serial Set. U.S. Government Printing Office: 766. 1921.
- Mohl, Michael. "K-5 (SS-36)". Navsource.net.
- Friedman, Norman (1995). U.S. Submarines Through 1945: An Illustrated Design History. Annapolis, Maryland: Naval Institute Press. ISBN 1-55750-263-3.
- Gardiner, Robert & Gray, Randal (1985). Conway's All the World's Fighting Ships 1906–1921. Annapolis, Maryland: Naval Institute Press. ISBN 0-85177-245-5.
- "K-5 (Submarine No. 36)". Dictionary of American Naval Fighting Ships. Navy Department, Naval History and Heritage Command. 9 July 2024. This article incorporates text from this source, which is in the public domain.
