= USS E-1 =

E-class submarine of the United States

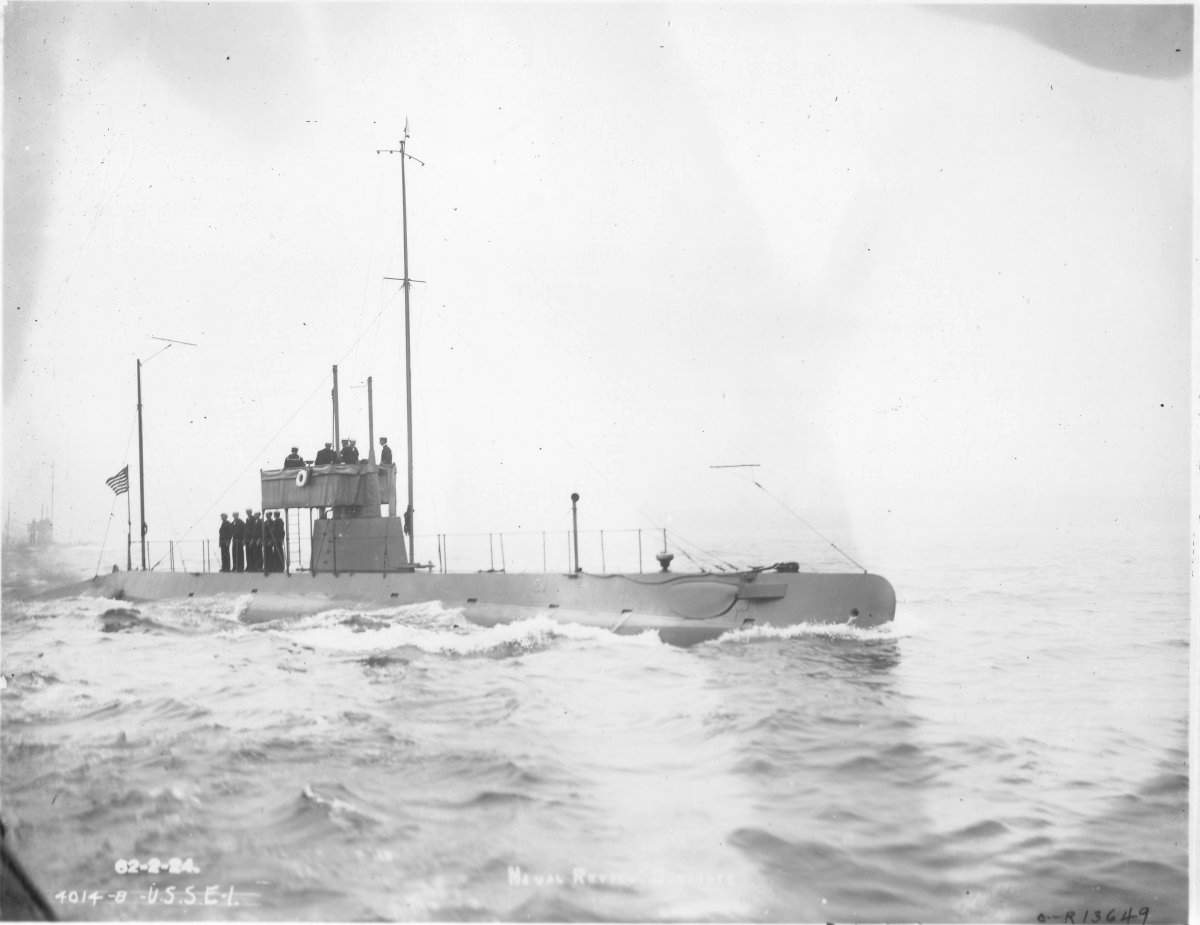
- USS E-1, ex-Skipjack, underway, starboard side view, at the Naval Review, at New York City, 4 October 1912

History

United States
- Name: Skipjack
- Namesake: The skipjack
- Builder: Fore River Shipyard, Quincy, Massachusetts
- Cost: $387,788.57 (hull and machinery)
- Laid down: 22 December 1909
- Launched: 27 May 1911
- Sponsored by: Mrs. Donald R. Battles
- Commissioned: 14 February 1912
- Decommissioned: 20 October 1921
- Renamed: E-1 (Submarine No.24), 17 November 1911
- Stricken: 6 March 1920
- Identification: Hull symbol: SS-24 (17 July 1920); Call sign: NSP
- Fate: Sold for scrapping, 19 April 1922

General characteristics
- Class & type: E-class submarine
- Displacement: 287 long tons (292 t) surfaced; 342 long tons (347 t) submerged
- Length: 135 ft 3 in (41.22 m)
- Beam: 14 ft 7 in (4.45 m)
- Draft: 11 ft 8 in (3.56 m)
- Installed power: 700 hp (522 kW) (diesel); 600 hp (447 kW) (electric)
- Propulsion: 2 × NELSECO diesel engines; 2 × Electro Dynamic electric motors; 2 × 60-cell batteries; 2 × Propellers
- Speed: 13.5 kn (25.0 km/h; 15.5 mph) surfaced; 11.5 kn (21.3 km/h; 13.2 mph) submerged
- Range: 2,100 nmi (3,900 km; 2,400 mi) at 11 kn (20 km/h; 13 mph) surfaced; 100 nmi (190 km; 120 mi) at 5 kn (9.3 km/h; 5.8 mph) submerged
- Test depth: 200 ft (61 m)
- Capacity: 8,486 US gal (32,120 L; 7,066 imp gal) fuel
- Complement: 1 officer; 19 enlisted
- Armament: 4 × 18 inch (450 mm) bow torpedo tubes (4 torpedoes)

USS Skipjack/E-1 (SS-24), also known as "Submarine No. 24", was an E-class submarine of the United States Navy (USN). She was the first boat in the USN named for the skipjack, though she was renamed E-1 prior to commissioning. She was the first American submarine to be powered by diesel engines. E-1 served in patrol duty in the waters around the Azores, during WWI.

== Construction ==
Skipjack was laid down on 22 December 1909, by the Fore River Shipbuilding Company, in Quincy, Massachusetts. She was launched on 27 May 1911, sponsored by Mrs. Donald R. Battles. She was renamed E-1 on 17 November 1911; and commissioned on 14 February 1912, with Lieutenant Chester W. Nimitz in command.

== Service history ==
=== 1912 ===
Six days after commissioning, E-1 sailed from Boston, Massachusetts, for Norfolk via Newport, Rhode Island, and New York. Off the Virginia Capes, she underwent tests through April. Her engines were overhauled at New London, until 4 July 1912, and she began operations off southern New England, based at Newport, through 19 August, when she arrived at Provincetown, Massachusetts. That same day, she was detached from the Torpedo Flotilla, Atlantic Fleet, and attached to the Atlantic Submarine Flotilla. She then shifted to Boston, before returning to Provincetown, 18 September. She then headed to the New York Navy Yard, in Brooklyn, New York, where she arrived on 20 September, for alterations, repairs, and installation of a Sperry gyrocompass, for which she became a pioneer underwater test ship. She also experimented with submerged radio transmission. E-1 conducted tests of these and other important developments under the direction of Commander, Atlantic Submarine Flotilla.

E-1 then moored at the North River, New York, on 12 October 1912. She passed in review with the fleet before Secretary of the Navy George von L. Meyer on 14 October. The following day, she proceeded down the Hudson, and out through The Narrows into the Atlantic. Bound for Norfolk, she arrived on 17 October. She remained there until 6 December, when she sailed up the Chesapeake Bay to Annapolis, Maryland. She then returned to Norfolk, on 8 December. Aside from visiting Lynnhaven Bay, Virginia, on 13 December, the submarine remained at Norfolk through the end of the year.

=== 1913 ===
On 8 January 1913, the Navy Department issued a memorandum stating that E-1 was finally accepted by the Navy. On 14 January, the Atlantic Submarine Flotilla was re-designated Submarine Flotilla, Torpedo Flotilla, Atlantic Fleet, and E-1 was assigned to the new organization. She cleared Norfolk, on 20 January, and proceeded southward making visits to Charleston, South Carolina, Brunswick, Georgia, Key West, Florida, and Nuevitas Bay, Cuba, before arriving at Guantanamo Bay, Cuba, on 6 February. She conducted training and trials in Cuban waters to 19 March, when she departed Nuevitas Bay, and proceeded to Jacksonville, Florida, en route to Newport. In transiting northward, she made visits to Charleston, Norfolk, and the New York Navy Yard, on 10 April, before reaching her destination at Newport, on 11 April. She remained there until 21 July, when she went to sea for exercises. Periodically returning to Newport, the submarine would operate from the Rhode Island port, in the waters off New England and Long Island, through the end of September. E-1 cleared Newport, on 1 October, and moored in the North River, on 2 October. Getting underway again on 11 October, she reached Hampton Roads, Virginia, on 12 October, before entering the Norfolk Navy Yard the following day. The submarine would remain at the navy yard into 1914.

=== 1914 ===
E-1 stood out from the Norfolk Navy Yard, on 5 January 1914, and proceeded to Georgetown, South Carolina, on 8 January. Departing the next day, she shifted to Charleston. She continuing on to Brunswick and Jacksonville, before she arrived at Key West, on 22 January. Instead of setting a course for Cuba, the boat departed on 27 January, and entered the Gulf of Mexico, en route to Galveston, Texas, she reached her destination on 1 February. After four days in port, she cleared on 5 February, and cruised the Gulf coast, making visits to New Orleans, Louisiana, Mobile, Alabama, Pensacola, Panama City, Tampa, and St. Petersburg, Florida, before returning to Key West, on 29 March 1914.

While E-1 lay at Key West, on 4 April 1914, the Atlantic Submarine Flotilla was detached from the Torpedo Flotilla, Atlantic Fleet, and re-designated the Submarine Flotilla, Atlantic Fleet. Clearing again on 7 April, she proceeded north with visits to Fernandina, Florida, Savannah, Georgia, Charleston, and Norfolk, before entering the New York Navy Yard, on 29 April, and remaining there until 10 May. After clearing the yard on 10 May, she proceeded directly to Norfolk, reaching the following day. Remaining at the yard until 16 July, she got underway on 16 July, and proceeded up Chesapeake Bay, and into the Potomac River to visit the Washington Navy Yard. She then made her way to the New York Navy Yard, en route to Newport, where she arrived on 27 July. There she would remain until 5 October, when she went to sea and made her way to Napeague Bay, New York, that same day. She returned to Newport, before moving on to New London, before standing back in to Newport. The boat cleared Narragansett Bay, on 21 October, bound for New York, she docked at the New York Navy Yard. Clearing on 30 October, she passed between the Virginia capes, and moored at Hampton Roads, on 31 October, before shifting to the Norfolk Navy Yard, on 5 November. She would remain there into 1915.

=== 1915 ===
E-1 cleared Norfolk, on 14 February 1915, and headed south as she had in the previous two winters. She visited Charleston and Fernandina, before arriving at Key West, on 25 February. Underway again on 2 March, the submarine transited to Pensacola, where she spent the ensuing weeks engaged in training. She departed Pensacola, on 27 April, and traveling via Key West, reached the North River, on 5 May. This was the longest non-stop trip undertaken by a US submarine to date, 1,230 nmi (2,280 km; 1,420 mi). She departed the North River, on 18 May, and conducted maneuvers while en route to Newport, where she arrived on 21 May. After a month at Newport, she cleared on 22 June, and entered the New York Navy Yard, on 23 June. E-1 cleared the yard on 26 July, and reached Newport, the following day. She would operate from there until her departure on 18 October, when she re-located to New London. She would remain at the base on the Thames River, through the end of the year. On 27 December 1915, E-1 was directed to proceed to the New York Navy Yard, by 1 February 1916, for the installation of a new storage battery and engines and general overhaul.

=== 1916 ===
E-1 departed New London, on 30 January 1916, and proceeded into Long Island Sound, to make her way to the New York Navy Yard. Arriving on 1 February, she docked to undergo her scheduled yard work. She remained there until clearing on 8 August, bound for Newport, where she reached later that same day. Over the ensuing six weeks, the submarine operated in the waters between Newport and New London. After a brief visit to New York, the submarine arrived at New London, and operated from there into the first quarter of 1917.

=== 1917 ===
With the German resumption of unrestricted submarine warfare on 1 February 1917, tensions between the US and Germany heightened. During this time, E-1 resumed operations underway and arrived at Newport, on 24 March. The following day she stood out and went to sea. conducting neutrality patrols and training exercises.

The US declared war on Germany, on 6 April 1917, and entered the Great War. The following day, E-1 arrived at New London, and then sailed on 10 April, bound for the New York Navy Yard, where she arrived later that day and secured alongside Tonopah, ex-monitor Nevada, that was assigned to operate as a tender to boats of the Fourth Division. She then underwent maintenance until entering dry dock on 19 April. She undocked on 1 May, and cleared the yard on 2 May. She stood in to New London, later that same day. The crew conducted training both on board and ashore at New London, over the following weeks. She got underway on 5 June, proceeding down the Thames, into Long Island Sound, bound for Port Jefferson, New York, Base No. 10, after making a test dive, she returned to New London, Base No. 22. Underway again on 8 June, she arrived at Port Jefferson. Returning to New London, on 10 June, she continued to operate based from here training officers and crew at the Submarine School. On 12 September, she received orders assigning her to Submarine Division Four. She shifted to the New York Navy Yard, on 1 October, and entered dry dock No. 1, on 3 October, remaining there undergoing overhaul until she came out on 13 October. She departed for New London, on 16 October, and arrived at her destination later that same day. The crew then spent the next two weeks with further training based from New London. The submarine got underway on 31 October, en route to Newport, Base No. 12, where she arrived on 1 November. She then returned to New London, before arriving back at Newport on 29 November, to make final preparations prior to departing for overseas deployment.

E-1, towed by steam tugboat Lykens, in company with the submarines L-1, L-2, L-3, L-4, L-9, L-10, and L-11, and the submarine tenders Fulton and Bushnell, cleared Narragansett Bay, on 4 December. Having charted a direct course to the Azores, the force encountered a gale that battered the boat and separated her from the tow vessel, on 7 December. Continuing under her own power, she began to develop a light knock in her starboard engine, on 12 December. She stood in to Bermuda, at 19:00, on 13 December, and was subsequently reported as being in fair condition. While at Bermuda, she moored alongside Prometheus and underwent overhaul.

=== 1918–1919 ===
E-1 cleared Bermuda, with the flotilla, on 1 January 1918, and proceeded through more storms to Ponta Delgada, Base No. 13, Azores, where she arrived at 07:30, on 12 January. After her arrival, she again underwent overhaul and repairs through most of the remainder of the month. She undertook her first patrol from 28 January–2 February, in Azorean waters. She was patrolling between Ponta Delgada and Horta and Fayal, against German U-boats and surface raiders with the purpose of denying the use of the archipelago as an operational haven by the Germans. During this time, E-1 served as the flagboat for Division Four (K-1, K-2, and K-6). She conducted two patrols during February, as well as spending time in port at Horta, before undergoing overhaul at Ponta Delgada. Departing for Horta, on 8 March, she spent the following weeks conducting patrols. On 27 May, an enemy submarine was reported 10,000 yd (5.7 mi; 9.1 km) off the harbor entrance to Ponta Delgada, E-1 was dispatched but her search proved inconclusive. She underwent another overhaul from 3–7 June, and then reported battery problems on 8 July, after conducting her patrols. Later, on 28 August, she again reported battery trouble and the next day it was determined that she could not have a replacement installed at Base No. 13, and would have to return to the US.

E-1 departed Ponta Delgada, on 4 September 1918, in tow of Machias, and having passed through a hurricane, made her return to New London, Base No. 22, where she secured alongside Pier H at 20:00, on 17 September. E-1 received orders transferring her to Submarine Division Two, on 26 September. During her post-deployment overhaul, the Armistice ending the war went into effect on 11 November. E-1 got underway and visited the Norfolk Navy Yard, on 2 December. She then returned to New London, where she spent the following months training new submariners and testing experimental listening gear.

=== 1919–1921 ===
E-1 was placed in commission in reserve on 20 March 1920, and returned to the Norfolk Navy Yard, on 22 April. During this time, on 8 April, she was detached from Submarine Division Two, and transferred to Submarine Division Five, with E-2 and M-1. She was re-classified SS-24 on 17 July 1920, as part of a Navy-wide administrative re-organization, shortly after she conducted training out of Annapolis.

== Fate ==
Back at Norfolk, she was placed in commission in ordinary on 18 July 1921, and on 17 September, she proceeded with E-2 to the Philadelphia Navy Yard, where she was decommissioned on 20 October 1921 and ordered sold on 5 November 1921.

E-1 was later sold as a hulk to Joseph G. Hitner, Philadelphia, on 19 April 1922, and scrapped.

== Bibliography ==
- "Table 21 - Ships on Navy List June 30, 1919". Congressional Serial Set. U.S. Government Printing Office: 764. 1921.
- Gary, Priolo. "Skipjack / E-1 (SS-24)". Navsource.net.
- "E-1". Dictionary of American Naval Fighting Ships. Navy Department, Naval History and Heritage Command. 11 January 2022. This article incorporates text from this source, which is in the public domain.
- "Commander and Record-Breaking Crew of E-1". Illustrated Evening Ledger. 8 May 1915.
