= USS K-1 (SS-32) =

K-class submarine of the United States

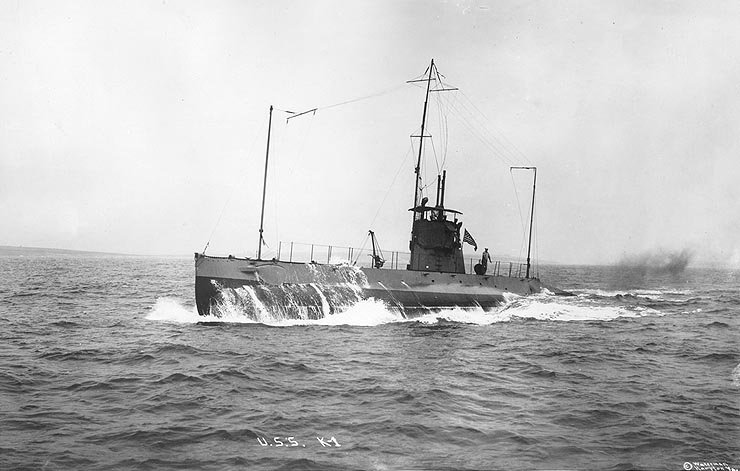
- USS K-1 while underway in c. 1916

History

United States
- Name: Haddock
- Namesake: The haddock
- Builder: Fore River Shipbuilding Company, Quincy, Massachusetts
- Cost: $478,370.50 (hull and machinery)
- Laid down: 20 February 1912
- Launched: 3 September 1913
- Sponsored by: Mrs. Albert Ware Marshall
- Commissioned: 17 March 1914
- Decommissioned: 7 March 1923
- Renamed: K-1 (Submarine No.32), 17 November 1911
- Stricken: 18 December 1930
- Identification: Hull symbol: SS-32 (17 July 1920); Call sign: NYF
- Fate: Sold for scrapping, 25 June 1931

General characteristics
- Class & type: K-class submarine
- Displacement: 392 long tons (398 t) surfaced; 521 long tons (529 t) submerged
- Length: 153 ft 7 in (46.81 m)
- Beam: 16 ft 8 in (5.08 m)
- Draft: 13 ft 1 in (3.99 m)
- Installed power: 950 hp (710 kW) (diesel engines); 340 hp (250 kW) (electric motors)
- Propulsion: 2 × NELSECO diesel engines; 2 × Electro Dynamic electric motors; 2 × 60-cell batteries; 2 × Propellers
- Speed: 14 kn (26 km/h; 16 mph) surfaced; 10.5 kn (19.4 km/h; 12.1 mph) submerged
- Range: 4,500 nmi (8,300 km; 5,200 mi) at 10 kn (19 km/h; 12 mph) surfaced; 120 nmi (220 km; 140 mi) at 5 kn (9.3 km/h; 5.8 mph) submerged
- Test depth: 200 ft (61 m)
- Capacity: 18,126 US gal (68,610 L; 15,093 imp gal) fuel
- Complement: 2 officers; 26 enlisted
- Armament: 4 × 18 inch (450 mm) bow torpedo tubes (8 torpedoes)

USS Haddock/K-1 (SS-32), also known as "Submarine No. 32", was the lead ship of her class of submarine of the United States Navy (USN). Originally named Haddock, she was the first ship in the USN named for the haddock, though she was renamed K-1 prior to being laid down. She patrolled off the Azores, during World War I.

== Design ==
The K-class boats had a length of 153 ft 7 in (46.8 m), a beam of 16 ft 8 in (5.1 m), and a mean draft of 13 ft 1 in (4.0 m). They displaced 451 long tons (458 t), on the surface, and 527 long tons (535 t) submerged. They had a diving depth of 200 feet (61.0 m). The K-class submarines had a crew of 2 officers and 26 enlisted men.

For surface running, the boats were powered by two 475-brake-horsepower (354 kW) NELSECO diesel engines, each driving one propeller shaft. When submerged each propeller was driven by a 170-horsepower (127 kW) electric motor. They could reach 14 kn (26 km/h; 16 mph) on the surface and 10.5 kn (19.4 km/h; 12.1 mph) underwater. On the surface, the boats had a range of 3,150 nmi (5,830 km; 3,620 mi) at 11 kn (20 km/h; 13 mph) and 120 nmi (220 km; 140 mi) at 5 knots (9.3 km/h; 5.8 mph) submerged.

The K-class submarines were armed with four 18 inch (450 mm) torpedo tubes in the bow. They carried four reloads, for a total of eight torpedoes.

== Construction ==
K-1's keel was laid down on 20 February 1912, by the Fore River Shipbuilding Company in Quincy, Massachusetts, as a subcontract for the Electric Boat Company. Her name had changed from Haddock, on 17 November 1911, she was the first US Navy ship named for the haddock, a small edible Atlantic fish related to the cod. She was launched on 3 September 1913, sponsored by Mrs. Albert Ware Marshall, and commissioned on 17 March 1914.

== Service history ==
=== 1914 ===
K-1 was initially assigned to duty with the 3rd Submarine Division, Submarine Flotilla, Torpedo Flotilla, Atlantic Fleet, on 18 March 1914. She departed Boston, on 5 June, and proceeded to the New York Navy Yard, Brooklyn, New York, where she arrived the next day. She cleared the yard on 4 July, and proceeded to Newport, Rhode Island, reaching that same day. Over the following weeks, she operated from Newport, in the waters off Rhode Island and Massachusetts, until departing on 14 August, bound for the New York Navy Yard. She entered the yard the next day and remained there until 2 October, when she cleared and proceeded up the Thames River to Groton, Connecticut, mooring later that same day. On 9 October, the boat detached from the 3rd Submarine Division, Submarine Flotilla, Torpedo Flotilla, Atlantic Fleet, for reassignment to the newly organized 4th Division.

K-1 cleared Groton, on 14 October 1914, and proceeded to Newport. Arriving that same day, she departed the next for New London, Connecticut, where she arrived that evening. The submarine remained there until 8 December, when she got underway for a two-day cruise before returning to New London. She then departed later on 10 December, and stood in to the New York Navy Yard, on 13 December, remaining there into the new year.

=== 1915 ===
The submarine cleared New York, on 19 January 1915, for underwater development training out of Key West, Florida. Proceeding via Charleston, South Carolina, the boat raised Key West, on 29 January. While based in Florida, she made a visit to Tampa, and conducted training in the waters off Pensacola. Having returned to Key West, on 27 April, she was underway again on 1 May, bound for the North River anchorage in the Hudson River, off New York City. Arriving on 6 May, she remained until 18 May, when she departed to conduct maneuvers while en route to Newport. Arriving on 19 May, she operated in the Narragansett Bay, until 20 June, when she set a course for a maintenance availability at the New York Navy Yard. Arriving on 21 June, the submarine entered the yard and underwent maintenance into the fall. Clearing the yard on 3 October, she proceeded to Newport. While en route, she conducted trials and training and made her arrival on 11 October. She continued to operate off Rhode Island until 31 October, when she got underway to return to the New York Navy Yard. Reaching on 1 November, the boat again docked in the yard. She would remain there into January 1916.

=== 1916 ===
K-1 stood out from the New York Navy Yard, on 27 January 1916. She was bound for Key West, via Charleston, and stood in to Key West, on 4 February. After two days, she cleared for Tampa, en route to Pensacola, where she arrived on 16 February. As she did the preceding year, K-1 conducted training based from Pensacola, until 26 April. Departing the Florida panhandle, she proceeded via Key West, to Hampton Roads, Virginia. Arriving on 4 May, she remained until 13 May, then departed for the New York Navy Yard.

K-1 entered dry dock at the New York Navy Yard, on 14 May 1916, and underwent overhaul to 3 August, when she cleared the yard for New London. From this base she conducted submerged training in advance of joining the Atlantic Fleet, to conduct maneuvers off Great Salt Pond, Rhode Island. She then returned to New London, to conduct oscillator tests. Underway again she was in Narragansett Bay, where she visited the Torpedo Station at Melville, and Newport, Rhode Island, before returning to New London. Clearing that station, she rejoined the fleet for exercises off the New Jersey coast and Rhode Island, before visiting Cold Spring Inlet. The submarine then refueled at the Philadelphia Navy Yard, and then returned to Cold Spring Inlet, to conduct training with a motor boat patrol. After a return to Philadelphia, the submarine made engineering performance runs at New London, then conducted torpedo proving practices at Block Island. After a torpedo turn-in at the Torpedo Station, at Melville, K-1 returned to Block Island, for additional torpedo practice. Moving in Long Island Sound to Gardiners Bay, she conducted her first preliminary Torpedo Practice, from 9–11 October, and then made her return to New London, for additional crew training from 11 to 29 October. K-1 then proceeded to the New York Navy Yard, and docked for overhaul through 9 January 1917.

=== 1917 ===
K-1 cleared the yard on 9 January 1917, bound for Hampton Roads. Upon her arrival, she took on supplies and completed additional repairs. Standing out through the Virginia capes, the submarine was en route to the Gulf of Mexico. After a visit to Key West, she shifted to Dry Tortugas, to conduct torpedo proving practice. Proceeding to Key West, on January 26, she departed that same day and conducted a patrol cruise to 5 February, when she arrived at Tampa, and remained there until 11 February. She then transited to Pensacola, to train her crew and conduct tactical exercises. The boat shifted to Mobile, Alabama, for liberty and recruiting activities. She then returned to Pensacola, where she conducted submerged training and tactical problems with other boats of the Submarine Force.

During this time tensions between the US and Imperial Germany heightened as a result of the latter's resumption of its unrestricted submarine warfare campaign on 1 February 1917. As a result, Atlantic Fleet assets were being consolidated along the East Coast in the anticipation of the outbreak of war. K-1 departed Pensacola, on 27 March, and proceeded via Key West, to Hampton Roads, reaching on 5 April. The next day, the US declared war on Germany, and the K-1 shifted to the Norfolk Navy Yard, Portsmouth, Virginia. After oiling, she cleared Norfolk, and proceeded north to the New York Navy Yard, before moving on to New London, (Base No. 22), to train her crew. Clearing New London on 8 May, she returned to the New York Navy Yard.

While K-1 underwent overhaul, Vice Admiral William S. Sims, Commander, US Naval Forces in European Waters, in June 1917, cited British success in using submarines as submarine hunter-killers in antisubmarine warfare (ASW). The Allied submarines, with their lower profiles, could approach U-boats more stealthily than larger surface patrol vessels. On 2 July, Admiral William S. Benson, Chief of Naval Operations, ordered the twelve most suitable submarines on the Atlantic coast be fitted out for duty in European waters. K-1 was selected for this duty and was fitted out for distant service.

K-1 received her movement orders on 25 September 1917. In advance of her deployment to European waters, she was to conduct a training run up the Long Island Sound, and then return to the New York Navy Yard, for an inspection of her engines. With that run and inspection completed, she cleared the New York Navy Yard, and returned to Submarine Base, New London, on 1 October.

K-1 departed New London, proceeding down the Thames River, on 12 October 1917, in company with the submarine tender Bushnell, and her sister boats K-2, K-5, and K-6. Passing through the Cape Cod Canal, and the vessels rendezvoused with the protected cruiser Chicago, flagship Submarine Force, Atlantic Fleet, at Provincetown, Massachusetts. The force stopped at Halifax, Nova Scotia, en route to the Azores, where it arrived at Ponta Delgada, Base No. 13, on October 27. K-1 received orders to operate from Ponta Delgada, and conduct patrol cruises off the Azores, in conjunction with her sister K-boats and the yet to arrive E-1. These boats were designated the 4th Division, Submarine Flotilla, Atlantic Fleet, while the L-boats, based in Ireland, were designated the 5th Division. For the duration of the war, she conducted a routine of patrol cruises in Azorean waters to protect shipping and to deny the use of the Portuguese archipelago as a base for U-boats, or as a haven for German surface raiders, interspersed with periods of refit, repairs, and replenishment.

=== 1918 ===
On 21 April 1918, K-1 departed for Horta, Azores, to replace E-1 in that sector. Arriving the next day, she conducted her designated patrolling until relieved. She then made her return to Ponta Delgada, on 1 May. In spite of these patrols, the submarine never made a reported contact with an enemy U-boat.

With the Armistice, and the cessation of hostilities, on 11 November 1918, the submarine departed the Azores, in company with Chicago, Arctic, and K-6. Transiting via Bermuda , all arrived at the Philadelphia Navy Yard, on 13 December. During post-deployment overhaul it was noted on 14 December, that both K-1 and K-6 were available for re-engining. K-1 underwent maintenance into spring 1919.

=== 1919–1922 ===
With the completion of her overhaul, K-1 cleared the Philadelphia Navy Yard, and with orders to return to and be based from New London, she resumed coastal operations. On 26 August 1919, K-1, K-2, K-6, and Eagle Boat Eagle No. 25 received orders to proceed to Key West, and report to Commander, Seventh Naval District, in order to assume station duties based from there. They departed on 8 September, with instructions to proceed via Hampton Roads; Wilmington, North Carolina; Charleston; Savannah, Georgia; Brunswick, Georgia; and Jacksonville, Florida. These orders were amended and she made a visit to the Philadelphia Navy Yard, en route. Having operated from Key West, K-1 received orders on 26 April 1920, dispatching her to the Section Base, Cape May, New Jersey, and from there to the Philadelphia Navy Yard, with the other K-boats for the installation of a new main motors. All proceeded north from Key West, on 20 May. While en route, she received amended orders and all proceeded directly to Philadelphia. Upon their arrival, all were reassigned to the Repair and Reserve Submarine Division and were to be placed in reserve until repairs were completed and sufficient crewmembers made available. The submarines arrived at the Philadelphia Navy Yard, on 7 July. Ten days later, on 17 July, K-1 was designated SS-32 as part of a Navy-wide administrative re-organization. The boat entered dry dock on 12 October.

On 15 January 1921, the Office of the Chief of Naval Operations (OpNav), directed K-1 to report to the Submarine Base, Hampton Roads. That order was amended to enable additional work to be completed. OPNAV, on 4 February, issued orders detaching the K-boats, from Submarine Division 3, and assigning them to Submarine Division 5, at Hampton Roads. The submarine's assignment changed again on 9 May, when she was assigned as part of the Division 5, contingent to the Special Submarine Squadron, with units from Division 8 and Division 15. The squadron consolidated at Provincetown, from 15 June–2 July. K-1 conducted tactical attack training exercises with Division 5, and its tender Bushnell, in advance of conducting joint maneuvers off Provincetown. After these maneuvers, she returned to her operating base at Gloucester, Massachusetts, to conduct overhaul from 25 to 30 July.

The division then conducted rehearsals and battle practice before rehearsing for and conducting Ready Torpedo Practice. She then conducted rehearsals and Battle Practice Z, before returning to her operating base for overhaul. The squadron then operated with a Destroyer Division, conducting joint maneuvers and then engaged in experimental torpedo practice, with the divisions acting in concert while the destroyers conducted depth charge practice, before conducting engineering runs, while en route to Hampton Roads. The squadron then engaged in target practices in the Chesapeake Bay. After the completion of the exercises, K-1 reported to the Philadelphia Navy Yard, for urgent repairs. On 2 December 1921, K-1 detached from the Special Submarine Squadron, and was reassigned to Division 5. With her repairs completed, K-1 cleared the Philadelphia Navy Yard, under tow of the fleet tug Kalmia, on 6 December, to the Submarine Base, Hampton Roads, where she remained through the end of the year.

K-1, with the new year, received orders on 12 January 1922, to proceed under tow of Wandank, back to the Philadelphia Navy Yard, for installation of new main storage batteries. That movement was actually made under the tow of the minesweeper Teal. On 7 March, she received orders to report to Submarine Base, New London, to rejoin Division 5 whence she operated into the autumn of 1922.

== Fate ==
K-1 arrived at the Submarine Base Hampton Roads, on 1 November 1922, and remained there until she decommissioned, entering dry dock on 29 January 1923, to prepare for decommissioning, that occurred on 9 March 1923.

Kewaydin towed the decommissioned submarine to the Philadelphia Navy Yard, on 15 September 1924. Ultimately, K-1 was stricken from the Naval Vessel Register on 18 December 1930, and sold as scrap, on 25 June 1931.

== Bibliography ==
- "Table 21 - Ships on Navy List June 30, 1919". Congressional Serial Set. U.S. Government Printing Office: 766. 1921.
- Priolo, Gary. "Haddock / K-1 (SS-32)". Navsource.net.
- Friedman, Norman (1995). U.S. Submarines Through 1945: An Illustrated Design History. Annapolis, Maryland: Naval Institute Press. ISBN 1-55750-263-3.
- Gardiner, Robert & Gray, Randal (1985). Conway's All the World's Fighting Ships 1906–1921. Annapolis, Maryland: Naval Institute Press. ISBN 0-85177-245-5.
- "K-1 (Submarine No. 32)". Dictionary of American Naval Fighting Ships. Navy Department, Naval History and Heritage Command. 9 July 2024. This article incorporates text from this source, which is in the public domain.
