= United States K-class submarine =

United States Navy submarine class

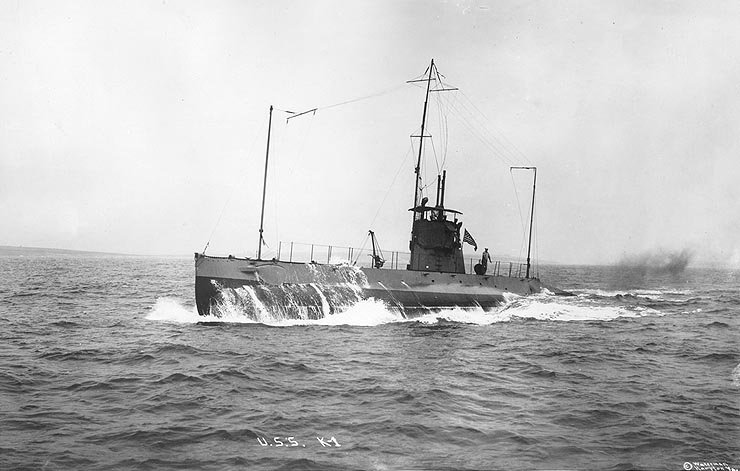
- USS K-1 underway in 1916

Class overview
- Name: K class
- Builders: Electric Boat (design); Fore River Shipyard, Quincy, Massachusetts (K-1, K-2, K-5, & K-6); Union Iron Works, San Francisco, California (K-3, K-7, & K-8); The Moran Company, Seattle, Washington (K-4)
- Operators: United States Navy
- Preceded by: H class
- Succeeded by: L class
- Built: 1912–1914
- In commission: 1914–1923
- Completed: 8
- Retired: 8

General characteristics
- Type: Submarine
- Displacement: 392 long tons (398 t) surfaced; 521 long tons (529 t) submerged
- Length: 153 ft 7 in (46.81 m)
- Beam: 16 ft 8 in (5.08 m)
- Draft: 13 ft 1 in (3.99 m)
- Installed power: 950 hp (710 kW) (diesel engines); 340 hp (250 kW) (electric motors)
- Propulsion: 2 × NELSECO diesel engines; 2 × Electro Dynamic electric motors; 2 × 60-cell batteries; 2 × Propellers
- Speed: 14 kn (26 km/h; 16 mph) surfaced; 10.5 kn (19.4 km/h; 12.1 mph) submerged
- Range: 4,500 nmi (8,300 km; 5,200 mi) at 10 kn (19 km/h; 12 mph) surfaced; 120 nmi (220 km; 140 mi) at 5 kn (9.3 km/h; 5.8 mph) submerged
- Test depth: 200 ft (61 m)
- Capacity: 18,126 US gal (68,610 L; 15,093 imp gal) fuel
- Complement: 2 officers; 26 enlisted
- Armament: 4 × 18 inch (450 mm) bow torpedo tubes (8 torpedoes)

The K-class submarines were a class of eight submarines of the United States Navy, serving between 1914 and 1923, including World War I. They were designed by Electric Boat and were built by other yards under subcontracts. K-1, K-2, K-5, and K-6 were built by Fore River Shipyard, in Quincy, Massachusetts, K-3, K-7, and K-8 by Union Iron Works, in San Francisco, California, and K-4 by The Moran Company, in Seattle, Washington. All were decommissioned in 1923, and scrapped in 1931, to comply with the limits of the London Naval Treaty.

== Design ==
The K-class of coastal defense submarines, although similar to the preceding H-class, were slightly larger. This followed a design trend by Electric Boat (EB) of simply scaling up a previous design to meet new performance requirements. In this design EB eliminated the watertight bulkheads that made the control room a separate space. The forward battery, control room, and after battery were one large space. The small conning tower was surrounded by a streamlined fairwater, there was no enclosed bridge for surface operations. Later, a pipe-frame and canvas bridge structure would be erected atop of the fairwater to serve as a makeshift bridge. Since USN tactical doctrine of the time did not emphasize crash dives, the considerable time it took to deploy or dismantle was not seen as a liability. Experience in World War I showed that this removable bridge was inadequate in the North Atlantic weather, and other submarines serving overseas in that war, E, K, and L-classes, had their bridge structures augmented with a "chariot" shield on the front of the bridge.

The K-class retained the rotating torpedo tube muzzle cap which was standard on previous classes. The cap was rotated so that two holes would line up with alternate torpedo tubes so that the weapons could be fired.

== Service ==
K-1, K-2, K-5, and K-6, began their careers on the US East Coast and were forward deployed to the Azores, in World War I, as convoy escorts, where their experience proved valuable in adapting future submarines for surfaced operations in rough weather. The remaining four were stationed on the West Coast, early in their careers, but were reassigned to Key West, Florida, for training and coastal security patrols in early 1918. All remained on the East Coast following the war for the rest of their careers.

Although considered to be successful submarines, the K-class coastal defense design was quickly overtaken by rapid advances in technology following World War I, and were of little use to the USN of the 1920s, with its new emphasis on global fleet operations. They were all discarded after only about nine years of service.

== Boats in class ==
The following ships of the class were constructed:

Construction data
Ship name	Hull class and no.	Builder	Laid down	Launched	Comm.	Decomm.	Renamed	Rename date	Reclass. hull no.	Reclass. hull no. date	Fate
Haddock	Submarine No. 32	Fore River Shipbuilding Company, Quincy, Massachusetts	20 February 1912	3 September 1913	17 March 1914	7 March 1923	K-1	17 November 1911	SS-32	17 July 1920	Sold for scrapping, 25 June 1931
Cachalot	Submarine No. 33	Fore River Shipbuilding Company, Quincy, Massachusetts	20 February 1912	4 October 1913	31 January 1914	9 March 1923	K-2	17 November 1911	SS-33	17 July 1920	Sold for scrapping, 3 June 1931
Orca	Submarine No. 34	Union Iron Works, San Francisco, California	15 January 1912	14 March 1914	30 October 1914	20 February 1923	K-3	17 November 1911	SS-34	17 July 1920	Sold for scrapping, 3 June 1931
Walrus	Submarine No. 35	The Moran Company, Seattle, Washington	27 January 1912	19 March 1914	24 October 1914	10 May 1923	K-4	17 November 1911	SS-35	17 July 1920	Sold for scrapping, 3 June 1931
K-5	Submarine No. 36	Fore River Shipbuilding Company, Quincy, Massachusetts	10 June 1912	17 March 1914	22 August 1914	20 February 1923			SS-36	17 July 1920	Sold for scrapping, 3 June 1931
K-6	Submarine No. 37	Fore River Shipbuilding Company, Quincy, Massachusetts	19 June 1912	26 March 1914	9 September 1914	21 May 1923			SS-37	17 July 1920	Sold for scrapping, 3 June 1931
K-7	Submarine No. 38	Union Iron Works, San Francisco, California	10 May 1912	20 June 1914	1 December 1914	12 February 1923			SS-38	17 July 1920	Sold for scrapping, 3 June 1931
K-8	Submarine No. 39	Union Iron Works, San Francisco, California	10 May 1912	11 July 1914	1 December 1914	24 February 1923			SS-39	17 July 1920	Sold for scrapping, 25 June 1931

== Bibliography ==
- Friedman, Norman (1995). US Submarines through 1945: An Illustrated Design History. Annapolis, Maryland: Naval Institute Press. ISBN 1-55750-263-3.
- Hedman, Ric; Johnston, David (3 July 2025). "K-class page". Pigboats.com.
- Priolo, Gary. "Haddock / K-1 (SS-32)". NavSource.
- Mohl, Michael. "Cachalot / K-2 (SS-33)". NavSource.
- Priolo, Gary. "Orca / K-3 (SS-34)". NavSource.
- Priolo, Gary. "Walrus / K-4 (SS-35)". NavSource.
- Mohl, Michael. "K-5 (SS-36)". NavSource.
- Mohl, Michael. "K-6 (SS-37)". NavSource.
- Priolo, Gary. "K-7 (SS-38)". NavSource.
- Priolo, Gary. "K-8 (SS-39)". NavSource.
