= USS K-6 =

K-class submarine of the United States

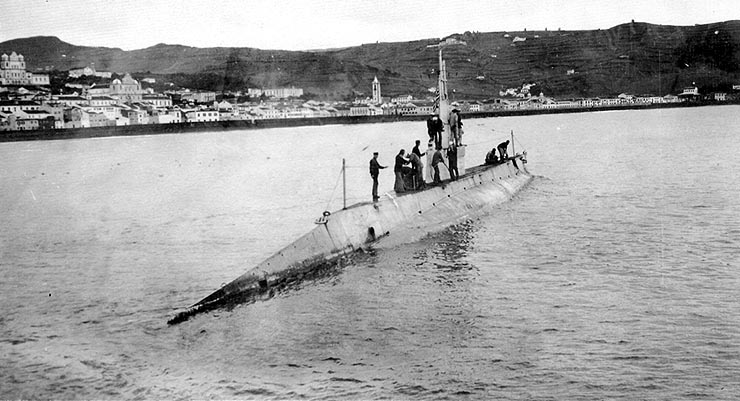
- Stern view of USS K-6 at Horta, Fayal, Azores, in December 1917

History

United States
- Name: K-6
- Builder: Fore River Shipyard, Quincy, Massachusetts
- Cost: $483,225.66 (hull and machinery)
- Laid down: 19 June 1912
- Launched: 26 March 1914
- Sponsored by: Mrs. Ethel Roberts
- Commissioned: 9 September 1914
- Decommissioned: 21 May 1923
- Stricken: 18 December 1930
- Identification: Hull symbol: SS-37 (17 July 1920); Call sign: NYK
- Fate: Sold for scrapping, 3 June 1931

General characteristics
- Class & type: K-class submarine
- Displacement: 392 long tons (398 t) surfaced; 521 long tons (529 t) submerged
- Length: 153 ft 7 in (46.81 m)
- Beam: 16 ft 8 in (5.08 m)
- Draft: 13 ft 1 in (3.99 m)
- Installed power: 950 hp (710 kW) (diesel engines); 340 hp (250 kW) (electric motors)
- Propulsion: 2 × NELSECO diesel engines; 2 × Electro Dynamic electric motors; 2 × 60-cell batteries; 2 × Propellers
- Speed: 14 kn (26 km/h; 16 mph) surfaced; 10.5 kn (19.4 km/h; 12.1 mph) submerged
- Range: 4,500 nmi (8,300 km; 5,200 mi) at 10 kn (19 km/h; 12 mph) surfaced; 120 nmi (220 km; 140 mi) at 5 kn (9.3 km/h; 5.8 mph) submerged
- Test depth: 200 ft (61 m)
- Capacity: 18,126 US gal (68,610 L; 15,093 imp gal) fuel
- Complement: 2 officers; 26 enlisted
- Armament: 4 × 18 inch (450 mm) bow torpedo tubes (8 torpedoes)

USS K-6 (SS-37), also known as "Submarine No. 37", was a K-class submarine of the United States Navy(USN). She patrolled off the Azores, during WWI.

== Design ==
The K-class boats had a length of 153 ft 7 in (46.8 m), a beam of 16 ft 8 in (5.1 m), and a mean draft of 13 ft 1 in (4.0 m). They displaced 451 long tons (458 t), on the surface, and 527 long tons (535 t) submerged. They had a diving depth of 200 feet (61.0 m). The K-class submarines had a crew of 2 officers and 26 enlisted men.

For surface running, the boats were powered by two 475-brake-horsepower (354 kW) NELSECO diesel engines, each driving one propeller shaft. When submerged each propeller was driven by a 170-horsepower (127 kW) electric motor. They could reach 14 kn (26 km/h; 16 mph) on the surface and 10.5 kn (19.4 km/h; 12.1 mph) underwater. On the surface, the boats had a range of 3,150 nmi (5,830 km; 3,620 mi) at 11 kn (20 km/h; 13 mph) and 120 nmi (220 km; 140 mi) at 5 knots (9.3 km/h; 5.8 mph) submerged.

The K-class submarines were armed with four 18 inch (450 mm) torpedo tubes in the bow. They carried four reloads, for a total of eight torpedoes.

== Construction ==
K-6's keel was laid down on 19 June 1912, by the Fore River Shipbuilding Company, in Quincy, Massachusetts, under a subcontract from the Electric Boat Company, of Groton, Connecticut. She was launched on 26 March 1914, sponsored by Mrs. Ethel Roberts, and commissioned on 9 September 1914, at the Boston Navy Yard.

== Service history ==
=== 1914 ===
K-6's initial assignment was to the Submarine Flotilla, Atlantic Fleet, on 14 September 1914. Several weeks later, that assignment changed to the 4th Division, Torpedo Flotilla, Atlantic Fleet, with the division's standup on 4 October. She cleared the Boston Navy Yard, on 16 November 1914. K-6 joined her division at the Torpedo Station, at Newport, Rhode Island, later that day for shakedown and training. She moved to the Submarine Base, New London, Connecticut, on 19 November, and operated from there conducting training until 10 December. Getting underway that day, she proceeded to the New York Navy Yard, Brooklyn, New York, and entered the yard on December 11, where she would remain into 1915.

=== 1915 ===
K-6 cleared the yard on 19 January 1915, and proceeded on a southerly course. Initially bound for Hampton Roads, Virginia, the submarine arrived at Charleston, South Carolina, on 26 January, before continuing her passage to Key West, Florida, where she arrived on 29 January. She remained until 5 February, when she stood out for the Gulf of Mexico. Transiting via Tampa, Florida, on 6 and 7 February, the submarine continued on to Pensacola, Florida, where she arrived on 9 February; she then spent the succeeding weeks conducting training in the waters off the Florida panhandle. With those evolutions concluded, she cleared on 25 April, and transiting via Key West, reached the North River anchorage in the Hudson River, off New York City, on 6 May.

K-6 departed for maneuvers on 18 May 1915, before arriving at Newport, on 27 May. She operated in the waters of Narragansett Bay, until 20 June, when she departed for the New York Navy Yard. Reaching the following day, she entered the yard until 2 October. She cleared the yard and reached Newport, on 3 October, before departing for maneuvers from 4–10 October. After returning to Newport, on October 10, she remained three weeks before departing on 31 October, and making her return to the New York Navy Yard, on 1 November, where she remained into January 1916.

=== 1916 ===
K-6 stood out from the New York Navy Yard, on 27 January 1916. Arriving at Charleston, on 31 January, she shifted to and docked at the Charleston Navy Yard, on 1 February. She remained there for a month, undocking on 1 March, and clearing for a return to Pensacola. Touching at Key West, she reached Pensacola, on 15 March. Much as she did the preceding year, K-6 conducted underwater warfare training with her fellow submarines off Pensacola. With the completion of that work, she departed on 26 April. Proceeding via Key West, and Hampton Roads, she stood in to the New York Navy Yard, on 14 May. The submarine remained until 3 August, when she got underway and arrived at New London, that same day. In succeeding days, she shifted to Newport, from whence she operated through 20 August. Getting underway for maneuvers, she then arrived at Cape May, New Jersey, on 28 August, before proceeding up the Delaware River, in to the Philadelphia Navy Yard, on 1 September.

The submarine cleared the Philadelphia Navy Yard, on 3 September 1916. Arriving at Cold Spring Inlet, New Jersey, two days later, she operated off the New Jersey coast until returning to Philadelphia, on 16 September. Standing down the Delaware River, on 16 September, she returned to New England waters touching at New London, on 18 August, and standing in to Newport, on 24 August. After a return to New London, for training, she cleared the Connecticut base on 30 October, and stood in to the New York Navy Yard, on 1 November. She departed the New York Navy Yard, on 3 December, and after touching at the Delaware Breakwater; Hampton Roads; and Charleston, arrived at Key West, on 22 December.

=== 1917 ===
After a month of operating based from Key West, K-6 sailed on 22 January 1917, and reached the Dry Tortugas, Florida, on 26 January, before returning to Key West, on 27 January. Departing on 4 February, she transited via Tampa, and reached Pensacola, on 12 February. While on the Gulf Coast, the submarine made a visit to Mobile, Alabama, from 17–21 February, before returning to Pensacola, on 21 February. For the next month she conducted training based from Pensacola, until 27 March.

During this time, tensions between the US and Imperial Germany had increased as a result of the latter's resumption of unrestricted submarine warfare on 1 February 1917. In light of this, the Atlantic Fleet was being consolidated in the waters of the Chesapeake Bay. K-6 sortied from Pensacola, on 27 March, bound for the Virginia capes. After touching at Key West, she reached Hampton Roads, on 5 April. The following day, the US declared war on Germany. The submarine departed Hampton Roads, on 10 April, and the next day arrived at the Ambrose Channel, entrance way to New York Harbor. She then proceeded in to the New York Navy Yard, before making her return to New London, on 24 April.

In June 1917, Vice Admiral William S. Sims, Commander, US Naval Forces in European Waters, in June 1917, cited British success in using submarines as submarine hunter-killers in antisubmarine warfare (ASW). The Allied submarines, with their lower profiles, could approach U-boats more stealthily than larger surface patrol vessels. On 2 July, Admiral William S. Benson, Chief of Naval Operations, ordered the twelve most suitable submarines on the Atlantic coast be fitted out for duty in European waters. K-6 was selected for this duty and was fitted out for distant service at the Philadelphia Navy Yard. Upon completion of these modifications, she returned to the Submarine Base, at New London, Base No. 22, and operated from that base.

K-6 departed New London, proceeding down the Thames River, on 12 October 1917, in company with Bushnell, K-1, K-2, and K-5. Passing through the Cape Cod Canal, the vessels rendezvoused with the protected cruiser Chicago, flagship Submarine Force, Atlantic Fleet, at Provincetown, Massachusetts. The force stopped at Halifax, Nova Scotia, enroute to the Azores, where it arrived at Ponta Delgada, Base No. 13, on October 27. K-6 received orders to operate from Ponta Delgada, and conduct patrol cruises of Azorean waters in conjunction with her sister K-boats and the yet to arrive E-1. These boats were designated the 4th Division, Submarine Flotilla, Atlantic Fleet, while the L-boats, based in Ireland, at Berehaven, were designated the 5th Division. For the duration of the war, K-6 conducted a routine of patrol cruises to protect Allied shipping and to deny the use of the Portuguese archipelago as a base for U-boats or as a haven for German surface raiders. These patrols were to be interspersed with periods of refit, repairs, and replenishment.

K-6 began her patrols within weeks of her arrival. The submarine, during December 1917, was dispatched to Horta, Fayal, Azores, on December 15, after a U-boat bombarded Funchal, Madeira, Azores, on 12 December. She operated with the converted yacht Margaret. Her commanding officer, on 27 December, interviewed the survivors of the Portuguese brigantine Lidia, sunk the preceding day by U-157, in order to gather intelligence. At month's end, she lay in port overhauling her engines and torpedoes.

=== 1918 ===
While patrolling off Galera Point, on 1 February 1918, K-6 suffered damage to her rudders and propellers. After a time alongside Bushnell undergoing repairs, she returned to her patrol regimen. The submarine sortied in company with K-1, on 24 May, for an offensive search of their designated patrol sector. K-6 was required to return to Ponta Delgada, the following day, due to mechanical breakdown as a result of striking bottom off the entrance to the harbor at Base 13. The incident prompted the convening of a board of investigation, on 3 June, on board the submarine tender Tonopah, at Ponta Delgada. The board rendered an opinion that, "no responsibility attaches to any individual for this grounding". Shortly after those proceedings the submarine changed commanders, and the boat spent the months following engaged in her patrol and maintenance routine until the Armistice of 11 November 1918, ended hostilities.

With war's end, K-6 sailed for the United States, on 21 November 1918, and arrived at the Philadelphia Navy Yard, via Bermuda, on 13 December.

=== 1919-1922 ===
After post-deployment overhaul, K-6 proceeded to New London, on 28 May 1919, to resume development of underwater warfare practices and conduct tactical operations along the New England coast. She was later assigned to a homeport at Key West.

Operating along the Atlantic coast, K-6 trained prospective submariners, conducted experimental dives, and underwater maneuvers. She received orders on 21 June 1920, re-assigning the homeport of her division, Submarine Division Three, from Key West to Philadelphia. Four days later, on June 25, that division was placed into an inactive status and on 7 July, all the submarines in the division were made available for all authorized yard work. While in this status, on 17 July 1920, K-6 was re-designated SS-37 as part of a Navy-wide administrative re-organization. The division then received orders, on 20 July, assigning them to the First Naval District to be based at Squantum, Massachusetts, upon the completion of their yard work at Philadelphia. That assignment was subsequently changed, on 15 January 1921, when she and the other K-boats were assigned to Submarine Base, Hampton Roads. In furtherance of these orders, the submarines were also reassigned from Division Three to Division Five.

K-6, on 9 May 1921, received orders assigning her to the Special Submarine Squadron, effective 15 May. During the following months, K-6 and the other submarines of the squadron conducted numerous experiments and maneuvers to improve the operational and tactical abilities of the submarine in the waters off New England and in the Chesapeake Bay. On 21 July, the submarine was forced to enter the Boston Navy Yard, to undergo urgent repairs to her main motor. On 2 December, her assignment, as well as that of the other K-boats, to the Special Submarine Squadron was cancelled, and she reverted to her previous assignment in Division Five.

== Fate ==
With orders, dated 27 January 1922, K-6, and the other boats of Division Five, reported to Commander, Submarine Base, New London. Arriving at Submarine Base, Hampton Roads, from New London, on 21 March 1923, K-6 decommissioned on 26 May. Subsequently, she was towed to Philadelphia, on 13 November 1924. Stricken from the Navy Register on 18 December 1930, she was sold on 31 January 1931, and scrapped by the purchaser on 3 June 1931.

== Bibliography ==
- "Table 21 - Ships on Navy List June 30, 1919". Congressional Serial Set. U.S. Government Printing Office: 767. 1921.
- Mohl, Michael. "K-6 (SS-37)". Navsource.net.
- Friedman, Norman (1995). U.S. Submarines Through 1945: An Illustrated Design History. Annapolis, Maryland: Naval Institute Press. ISBN 1-55750-263-3.
- Gardiner, Robert & Gray, Randal (1985). Conway's All the World's Fighting Ships 1906–1921. Annapolis, Maryland: Naval Institute Press. ISBN 0-85177-245-5.
- "K-5 (Submarine No. 36)". Dictionary of American Naval Fighting Ships. Navy Department, Naval History and Heritage Command. 9 July 2024. This article incorporates text from this source, which is in the public domain.
