= William Nelson Little =

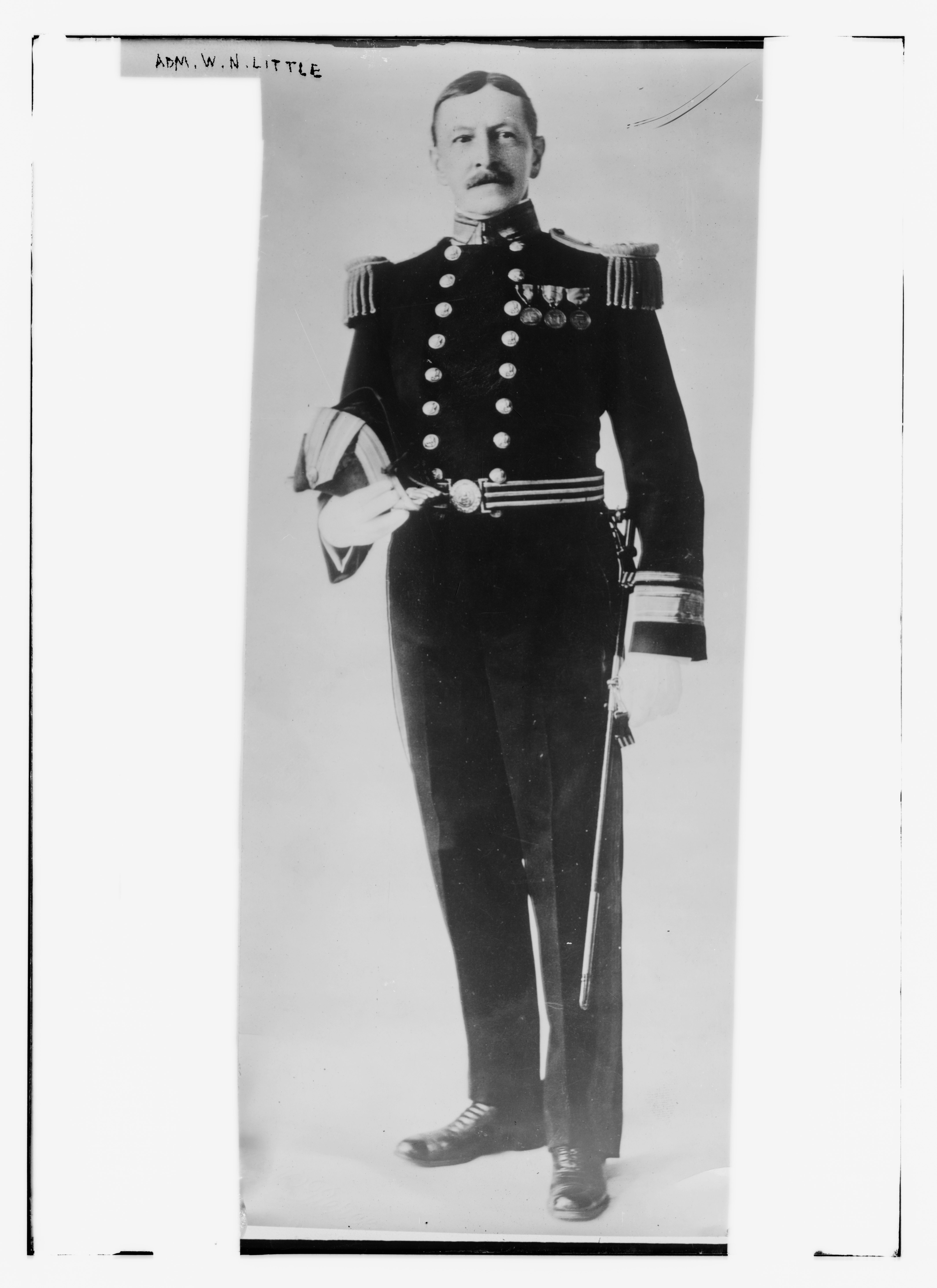
Rear Admiral William Nelson Little circa 1915

Rear Admiral William Nelson Little (December 31, 1852 – January 4, 1925) was a United States naval officer who was court martialed in 1915 on charges of negligence during his inspection of the submarine USS K-2. This was one of the few times that a retired military person was court martialed. He was not convicted, but Secretary of the Navy Josephus Daniels censured him for leaving the Navy no legal recourse against the Electric Boat Company for having supplied defective submarine batteries.

Little was born in Newburgh, New York, on December 31, 1852. He graduated from the United States Naval Academy in 1875 and was promoted to rear admiral in 1913.

After his death, Little was interred at Arlington National Cemetery with his wife Catherine Platt "Kate" (Sewell) Little.
