= USS K-2 (SS-33) =

K-class submarine of the United States Navy

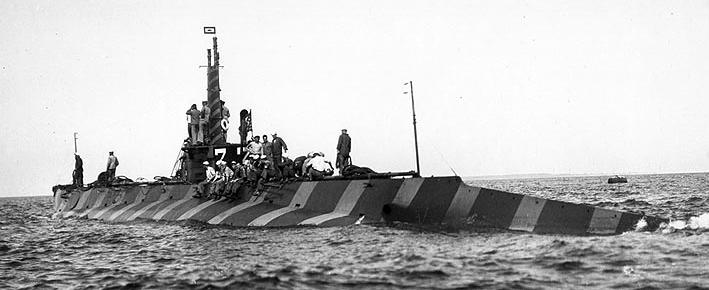
- USS K-2 painted in an experimental "zebra" camouflage scheme, Pensacola, Florida, on 12 April 1916

History

United States
- Name: Cachalot
- Namesake: The cachalot
- Builder: Fore River Shipbuilding Company, Quincy, Massachusetts
- Cost: $481,495.45 (hull and machinery)
- Laid down: 20 February 1912
- Launched: 4 October 1913
- Sponsored by: Miss Ruth Chamberlain McEntee
- Commissioned: 31 January 1914
- Decommissioned: 9 March 1923
- Renamed: K-2 (Submarine No.33), 17 November 1911
- Stricken: 18 December 1930
- Identification: Hull symbol: SS-32 (17 July 1920); Call sign: NYG
- Fate: Sold for scrapping, 3 June 1931

General characteristics
- Class & type: K-class submarine
- Displacement: 392 long tons (398 t) surfaced; 521 long tons (529 t) submerged
- Length: 153 ft 7 in (46.81 m)
- Beam: 16 ft 8 in (5.08 m)
- Draft: 13 ft 1 in (3.99 m)
- Installed power: 950 hp (710 kW) (diesel engines); 340 hp (250 kW) (electric motors)
- Propulsion: 2 × NELSECO diesel engines; 2 × Electro Dynamic electric motors; 2 × 60-cell batteries; 2 × Propellers
- Speed: 14 kn (26 km/h; 16 mph) surfaced; 10.5 kn (19.4 km/h; 12.1 mph) submerged
- Range: 4,500 nmi (8,300 km; 5,200 mi) at 10 kn (19 km/h; 12 mph) surfaced; 120 nmi (220 km; 140 mi) at 5 kn (9.3 km/h; 5.8 mph) submerged
- Test depth: 200 ft (61 m)
- Capacity: 18,126 US gal (68,610 L; 15,093 imp gal) fuel
- Complement: 2 officers; 26 enlisted
- Armament: 4 × 18 inch (450 mm) bow torpedo tubes (8 torpedoes)

USS Cachalot/K-2 (SS-33), also known as "Submarine No. 33", was a K-class submarine, of the United States Navy (USN). Originally named Cachalot, she was the first ship in the USN to be named for the cachalot, though she was renamed K-2 before being laid down. She patrolled off the Azores, during World War I.

== Design ==
The K-class boats had a length of 153 ft 7 in (46.8 m), a beam of 16 ft 8 in (5.1 m), and a mean draft of 13 ft 1 in (4.0 m). They displaced 451 long tons (458 t), on the surface, and 527 long tons (535 t) submerged. They had a diving depth of 200 feet (61.0 m). The K-class submarines had a crew of 2 officers and 26 enlisted men.

For surface running, the boats were powered by two 475-brake-horsepower (354 kW) NELSECO diesel engines, each driving one propeller shaft. When submerged each propeller was driven by a 170-horsepower (127 kW) electric motor. They could reach 14 kn (26 km/h; 16 mph) on the surface and 10.5 kn (19.4 km/h; 12.1 mph) underwater. On the surface, the boats had a range of 3,150 nmi (5,830 km; 3,620 mi) at 11 kn (20 km/h; 13 mph) and 120 nmi (220 km; 140 mi) at 5 knots (9.3 km/h; 5.8 mph) submerged.

The K-class submarines were armed with four 18 inch (450 mm) torpedo tubes in the bow. They carried four reloads, for a total of eight torpedoes.

== Construction ==
K-2's keel was laid down on 20 February 1912, by the Fore River Shipbuilding Company in Quincy, Massachusetts, as a subcontract for the Electric Boat Company. Her name had changed from Cachalot, on 17 November 1911, she was the first US Navy ship named for the cachalot, another name for the sperm whale. She was launched on 4 October 1913, sponsored by Miss Ruth Chamberlain McEntee, and commissioned on 31 January 1914.

== Service history ==
=== 1914 ===
K-2 was initially assigned to the 3rd Division, Submarine Flotilla, Torpedo Flotilla, Atlantic Fleet, as of 2 February 1914.

The batteries in the submarine failed just two months after the sea trial and Rear Admiral William Nelson Little was court-martialed for accepting the submarine, even after problems with the batteries were recognized.

The submarine got underway and cleared the Boston Navy Yard, on 5 June 1914, and reached the New York Navy Yard, Brooklyn, New York, the following day, whereupon she drydocked for overhaul. With her work completed, she cleared the yard, on 4 July, and proceeded north to Newport, Rhode Island. Getting underway on 28 July, she shuttled to Buzzard's Bay, Massachusetts, before returning to Newport. She the visited Provincetown, Massachusetts, before returning to Newport. Departing on 22 September, she proceeded to Groton, Connecticut, where she remained until September 26. Returning to Newport, that same day, she remained until 5 October, when she got underway for Napeague Bay, New York, and making her return to Newport, on 10 October. While she was en route back into Newport, on 9 October, K-2 detached from the 3rd Division, Submarine Flotilla, Torpedo Flotilla, Atlantic Fleet, and was assigned to the newly-organized 4th Division. Clearing Newport, on 15 October, the submarine arrived later that day at the Submarine Base, New London, Connecticut. She remained there until 3 December, when she returned to Newport, before making her way back to New London, on 8 December. After a cruise, she cleared New London, on 10 December, and arrived at the New York Navy Yard, on 12 December. The boat drydocked at the yard and remained there into January 1915.

=== 1915 ===
K-2 cleared the New York Navy Yard, on 19 January 1915, and set a course for Key West, Florida, via Charleston, South Carolina. Raising Key West, on 29 January, she remained until 5 February, when she departed for training at Pensacola, Florida. En route, she visited Tampa, before continuing her transit, reaching Pensacola, on 9 February. The submarine would operate in the waters off Pensacola, conducting training, to 25 April, when she departed. Touching at Key West, she continued on to the North River anchorage, in the Hudson River, off New York City. Remaining for 12 days, she got underway on 18 May, for Newport. En route she conducted maneuvers and raised her destination on 25 May. Operating from Newport, during the following weeks, she departed that location on 20 June, bound for the New York Navy Yard. Arriving the next day, she entered the yard and docked for a maintenance availability into the fall.

With her work completed, K-2 cleared the New York Navy Yard, on 2 October, bound for Newport. Arriving that same day, she remained in port overnight and then got underway the next morning for maneuvers until 10 October, when she made her return to Newport. After three weeks, the boat stood out from Newport, on 31 October and proceeded to the New York Navy Yard. Entering the yard on 1 November, she remained there through the end of the year.

=== 1916 ===
K-2 was again underway on 29 January 1916. Bound for Key West, via Charleston, she reached on 4 February. Remaining just two days, she cleared to again to conduct training at Pensacola, as she had the preceding year. As before, she stopped for a visit at Tampa, en route. She arrived at Pensacola, on 26 February and remained there conducting training for two months.

With orders to proceed to the New York Navy Yard, K-2 cleared on 26 April 1916, and after touching at Key West, and Hampton Roads, Virginia, stood in to the New York Navy Yard, on 14 May, to undergo maintenance. While at the yard on 15 May, the steamer Aragon collided with K-2 prompting a board of investigation and a trial by the Steamboat Inspection Service for the steamer's second mate on a charge of negligence.

K-2 completed her yard work and cleared the New York Navy Yard, on 3 August 1916, and arrived that same day at New London. Shifting to Newport, she operated from that station through the following weeks conducting maneuvers and other tactical training. At the completion of those exercises, she proceeded to the Philadelphia Navy Yard, via Cape May, New Jersey, and arrived on 1 September. After oiling, she departed on 3 September, for the New Jersey coast where she operated from Cold Spring Inlet, before returning to the Philadelphia Navy Yard, on 12 September. After four days, she departed on 16 September, bound for New London. Arriving on 18 September, she remained there until 30 October, when she proceeded down the Thames River into the Long Island Sound, bound for another docking at the New York Navy Yard. Upon her arrival later that same day, she entered the yard and remained there into 1917.

=== 1917 ===
K-2 cleared the New York Navy Yard, on 26 January 1917, with orders to head to southern waters. Before she did so she made a short visit to New London, then returned to New York. Finally clearing New York, she proceeded to Beaufort, North Carolina; Cape Fear Light; and Charleston, before arriving at Key West, on 17 February. Remaining overnight, the boat was again underway the next day, bound for a return to Pensacola, she raised her destination on 20 February.

As K-2 conducted her annual training in the Gulf of Mexico, off Pensacola, relations between the US and Imperial Germany became strained pursuant to the latter's resumption of its unrestricted submarine warfare campaign on 1 February 1917. As a result, Atlantic Fleet assets were being consolidated along the East Coast, in the anticipation of the outbreak of war. K-2 departed Pensacola, on 27 March, and proceeded via Key West, to Hampton Roads, reaching there on 5 April. The next day, the US declared war on Germany. After oiling, she cleared Norfolk, and proceeded north to the Ambrose Channel, from whence, she entered the New York Navy Yard, before moving on to New London, (Base No. 22), to train her crew. Clearing New London, on 8 May, she returned to the New York Navy Yard, that same day, in advance of departing on 9 May, for the Philadelphia Navy Yard. Entering the yard on 11 May, she spent the following months undergoing modifications for war service.

While K-2 underwent overhaul, Vice Admiral William S. Sims, Commander, US Naval Forces in European Waters, in June 1917, cited British success in using submarines as submarine hunter-killers in antisubmarine warfare (ASW). The Allied submarines, with their lower profiles, could approach U-boats more stealthily than larger surface patrol vessels. On 2 July, Admiral William S. Benson, Chief of Naval Operations, ordered the twelve most suitable submarines on the Atlantic coast be prepared for duty in European waters. K-2 was selected for this duty and was fitted out for distant service. K-2 completed her pre-deployment refit and cleared the Philadelphia Navy Yard, on 7 October 1917. Proceeding to New London, she rendezvoused with the other K-boats set for overseas deployment on 8 October.

K-2 departed New London, proceeding down the Thames River, on 12 October 1917, in company the submarine tender Bushnell, and her sister boats K-1, K-5, and K-6. Passing through the Cape Cod Canal and the vessels rendezvoused with the protected cruiser Chicago, flagship Submarine Force, Atlantic Fleet, at Provincetown. The force stopped at Halifax, Nova Scotia, en route to the Azores, where it arrived at Ponta Delgada, Base No. 13, on 27 October. K-2 received orders to operate from Ponta Delgada, and conduct patrol cruises off the Azores, in conjunction with her sister K-boats and the yet to arrive E-1. These boats were designated the 4th Division, Submarine Flotilla, Atlantic Fleet, while the L-boats based in Ireland, were designated the 5th Division. K-2 was the first US submarine to go out on patrol during the war. For the duration of her deployment, she conducted a routine of patrol cruises in Azorean waters to protect shipping and to deny the use of the Portuguese archipelago as a base for U-boats or as a haven for German surface raiders interspersed with periods of refit, repairs, and replenishment.

=== 1918 ===
During her assignment at Ponta Delgada, the submarine was dispatched on 10 July 1918, to visit Lisbon, Portugal, where she drydocked, before making her return to Base No. 13, on 16 August.

K-2 then resumed her routine patrolling duties until 20 October 1918, when she departed Ponta Delgada, for the US. Transiting via Bermuda, the submarine arrived at the Philadelphia Navy Yard, on 10 November. The following day the Armistice was signed and hostilities ceased. K-2 and her sister submarines, after their post-deployment refit and overhaul, could resume their peacetime operations.

=== 1919-1922 ===
With the completion of her overhaul, K-2 cleared the Philadelphia Navy Yard, and with orders to return to and be based from New London, she resumed coastal operations. On 26 August 1919, K-1, K-2, K-6, and Eagle No. 25 received orders to proceed to Key West, and report to Commander, Seventh Naval District, in order to assume station duties based from there. They departed on 8 September 1919, with instructions to proceed via Hampton Roads; Wilmington, North Carolina; Charleston, South Carolina; Savannah, Georgia; Brunswick, Georgia; and Jacksonville, Florida. These orders were amended and she made a visit to the Philadelphia Navy Yard, en route. Having operated from Key West, K-2 received orders on 26 April 1920, dispatching her to Section Base, Cape May, and from there to the Philadelphia Navy Yard, with the other K-boats for the installation of new main motors. All proceeded north from Key West, on 20 May. While en route, she received amended orders and all proceeded directly to Philadelphia. Upon their arrival, all were re-assigned to the Repair and Reserve Submarine Division, and were to be placed in reserve until repairs were completed and sufficient crewmembers made available. The submarines arrived at the Philadelphia Navy Yard, on 7 July. Ten days later, on 17 July, K-2 was designated SS-33 as part of a Navy-wide administrative re-organization. The boat entered dry dock on 12 October.

On 15 January 1921, the Office of the Chief of Naval Operations (OPNAV), directed K-2 to report to the Submarine Base, Hampton Roads. That order was amended to enable additional work to be completed. OPNAV, on 4 February, issued orders detaching the K-boats from Submarine Division 3, and assigning them to Submarine Division 5, at Hampton Roads. The submarine's assignment changed again on 9 May, when she was assigned as part of the Division 5 contingent to the Special Submarine Squadron, with units from Division 8 and Division 15. The squadron consolidated at Provincetown. K-2 conducted tactical attack training exercises with Division 5, and its tender Bushnell, in advance of conducting joint maneuvers off Provincetown. After these maneuvers, she returned to her operating base at Gloucester, to conduct overhaul from 25–30 July.

The division then conducted rehearsals and battle practice, 1–6 August 1921, before rehearsing for and conducting Ready Torpedo Practice. She then conducted rehearsals and Battle Practice Z, before returning to her operating base for overhaul. The squadron then operated with a destroyer division conducting joint maneuvers and then engaged in experimental torpedo practice with the divisions acting in concert while the destroyers conducted depth charge practice before conducting engineering runs while en route to Hampton Roads. The squadron then engaged in target practices in the Chesapeake Bay, from 19 September–1 October. After the completion of the exercises, K-2 reported to the Philadelphia Navy Yard, for urgent repairs. K-2 detached from the Special Submarine Squadron, on 2 December, and was re-assigned to Division 5. The boat then arrived at Submarine Base, Hampton Roads, on 6 December, where she remained through the end of the year.

In March 1922, K-2 reported to New London, to rejoin Division 5, and operate from that base. With the end of her operational life approaching, she arrived at Hampton Roads, on 15 November 1922, and on 29 January 1923, entered dry dock in preparation for decommissioning.

== Fate ==
K-2 was decommissioned on 9 March 1923, and was towed to the Philadelphia Navy Yard, in September 1924. Stricken from the Naval Vessel Register on 18 December 1930, she was later sold for scrap, on 3 June 1931.

== Bibliography ==
- "Table 21 - Ships on Navy List June 30, 1919". Congressional Serial Set. U.S. Government Printing Office: 766. 1921.
- Mohl, Michael. "Cachalot / K-2 (SS-33)". Navsource.net.
- Friedman, Norman (1995). U.S. Submarines Through 1945: An Illustrated Design History. Annapolis, Maryland: Naval Institute Press. ISBN 1-55750-263-3.
- Gardiner, Robert & Gray, Randal (1985). Conway's All the World's Fighting Ships 1906–1921. Annapolis, Maryland: Naval Institute Press. ISBN 0-85177-245-5.
- "K-2 (Submarine No. 33)". Dictionary of American Naval Fighting Ships. Navy Department, Naval History and Heritage Command. 9 July 2024. This article incorporates text from this source, which is in the public domain.
- "Admiral Little Faces Navy Court. Documents Produced to Show Defects in the Submarine K-2, Built Under His Inspection. Lieut. Moses Tells of Faulty Batteries and Many Reports That He Made to the Admiral". New York Times. 2 November 1915. "The court-martial which Secretary Daniels ordered to try Rear Admiral William Nelson Little, U. S. N., retired, on charges of negligence in connection with the inspection of the work on the submarine K-2 at the Fore River Ship Yards, convened at the Navy Yard today and at once plunged into its task."
