= USS M-1 =

M-class submarine of the United States

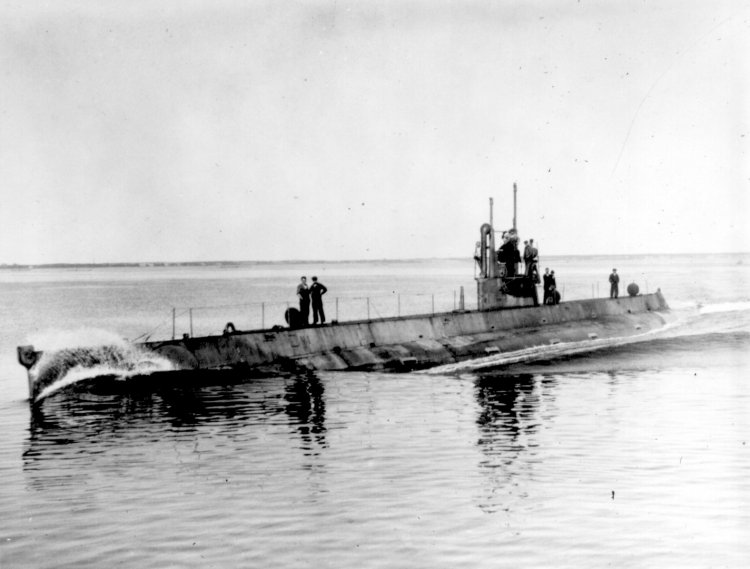
- USS M-1 underway during acceptance trials, off Provincetown, Massachusetts, 26 June 1916

Class overview
- Name: M class
- Builders: Electric Boat Company (design); Fore River Shipbuilding, Quincy, Massachusetts
- Operators: United States Navy
- Preceded by: L class
- Succeeded by: AA-1 class
- Built: 1914–1918
- In commission: 1918–1922
- Planned: 1
- Completed: 1
- Scrapped: 1

History

United States
- Name: M-1
- Builder: Electric Boat Company (design); Fore River Shipbuilding, Quincy, Massachusetts
- Cost: $618,899.30 (hull and machinery)
- Laid down: 2 July 1914
- Launched: 14 September 1915
- Sponsored by: Miss Sara Dean Roberts
- Commissioned: 16 February 1918
- Decommissioned: 15 March 1922
- Stricken: 16 March 1922
- Identification: Hull symbol: SS-47 (17 July 1920); Call sign: NYY
- Fate: Sold for scrap, 25 September 1922

General characteristics
- Type: Submarine
- Displacement: 488 long tons (496 t) surfaced; 676 long tons (687 t) submerged
- Length: 197 ft (60 m)
- Beam: 19 ft (5.8 m)
- Draft: 11 ft (3.4 m)
- Installed power: 840 bhp (630 kW) diesel; 340 hp (250 kW) electric
- Propulsion: NELSECO diesel engines; 2 × Electro Dynamic Company electric motors; 2 × 60-Cell batteries; 2 × Propellers
- Speed: 14 kn (26 km/h; 16 mph) surfaced; 10.5 kn (19.4 km/h; 12.1 mph) submerged
- Range: 2,750 nmi (5,090 km; 3,160 mi) at 11 kn (20 km/h; 13 mph) surfaced
- Test depth: 150 ft (46 m)
- Capacity: 28,422 US gal (107,590 L; 23,666 imp gal) fuel
- Complement: 2 officers; 26 enlisted
- Armament: 4 × 18 inch (450 mm) bow torpedo tubes (8 torpedoes); 1 × 3 in (76 mm)/23 caliber deck gun

USS M-1 (SS-47), also known as "Submarine No. 46", was a unique submarine of the United States Navy. Although built as a fully operational boat, M-1 was built with a radically different double-hulled design. This was in marked contrast to Simon Lake's and Electric Boat's single-hulled concepts. Ultimately shown to be unsuccessful, no other submarines of this class were ever built, although future advances in construction, and metallurgy science, made the double hull design a standard for the USN.

== Design ==
A double hull design moves most of the fuel and ballast tanks out of the pressure hull and into the spaces between the outer and inner hulls. Electric Boat had built only one other double hull design, EB31A for Imperial Russia, and thus lacked experience in this hull type. Due to the boat's still fairly small size the tankage space was very tight and difficult to maintain. It also resulted in a complicated venting and flooding arrangement that at times led to an uneven distribution of ballast water. This led to serious problems in stability when making the transition from submerged to surface. To save weight in the pressure hull, the structural strength was reduced, making her test depth only 150 ft (46 m). M-1 was built with the same armament and speed as the preceding L-class, but she was larger, due to the double hull design. Her batteries were also in one large compartment, forward of the control room, as opposed to two compartments, fore and aft of control room, as in other Electric boat designs. She also had heaters to keep the crew warm in northern waters and an icebox for food storage. The partially retractable 3 in (76 mm)/23 caliber deck gun, designed for submarines, and intended for incorporation in the L-class, was installed on M-1 prior to installation on any of the L-class.

== Construction ==
M-1's keel was laid down on 2 July 1914, by the Fore River Shipbuilding Company, in Quincy, Massachusetts, a subcontractor to the Electric Boat Company, of Groton, Connecticut. She was launched on 14 September 1915, sponsored by Miss Sara Dean Roberts, and commissioned on 16 February 1918.

== Service history ==
Following commissioning, M-1 was assigned to Submarine Division 2 (SubDiv2), and was home ported at Newport, Rhode Island. Unlike most other US submarines, she was not deployed overseas in World War I. For the next three years, she operated off the East Coast, training submariners. During her last year of active service, she was under the operational control of SubDiv 5 and SubDiv 3.

== Fate ==
After four years of testing and training service, M-1 was decommissioned at Philadelphia Naval Shipyard, on 15 March 1922, struck from the Naval Vessel Register the following day, and was sold for scrap on 25 September 1922, to Joseph G. Hitner, of Philadelphia, Pennsylvania.

== Bibliography ==
- "Table 21 - Ships on Navy List June 30, 1919". Congressional Serial Set. U.S. Government Printing Office: 767. 1921.
- Priolo, Gary. "M-1 (SS-47)". Navsource.net.
- Friedman, Norman (1995). U.S. Submarines Through 1945: An Illustrated Design History. Annapolis, Maryland: Naval Institute Press. ISBN 1-55750-263-3.
- Cressman, Robert J. (12 January 2021). "M-1 (Submarine No. 47)". Dictionary of American Naval Fighting Ships. Navy Department, Naval History and Heritage Command. This article incorporates text from this source, which is in the public domain.
- Alden, John D. (1979). The Fleet Submarine in the U.S. Navy: A Design and Construction History. Annapolis, Maryland: Naval Institute Press. ISBN 0-87021-187-0.
