= USS K-3 (SS-34) =

K-class submarine of the United States

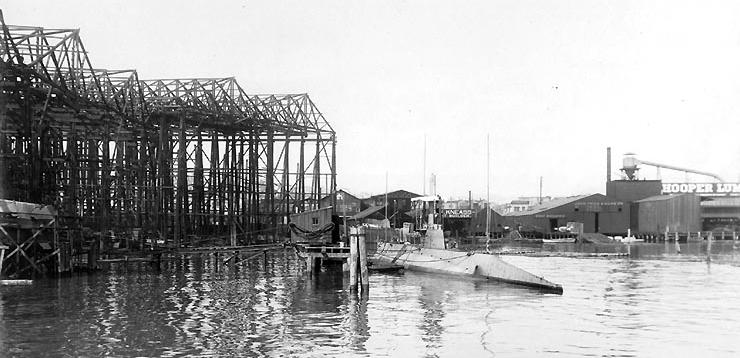
- USS K-3 fitting out at the Union Iron Works shipyard, San Francisco, California, on 7 April 1914

History

United States
- Name: Orca
- Namesake: The orca
- Builder: Union Iron Works, San Francisco, California
- Cost: $551,607.67 (hull and machinery)
- Laid down: 15 January 1912
- Launched: 14 March 1914
- Sponsored by: Mrs. Clarence Meigs Oddie
- Commissioned: 30 October 1914
- Decommissioned: 20 February 1923
- Renamed: K-3 (Submarine No.34), 17 November 1911
- Stricken: 18 December 1930
- Identification: Hull symbol: SS-34 (17 July 1920); Call sign: NYH
- Fate: Sold for scrapping, 3 June 1931

General characteristics
- Class & type: K-class submarine
- Displacement: 392 long tons (398 t) surfaced; 521 long tons (529 t) submerged
- Length: 153 ft 7 in (46.81 m)
- Beam: 16 ft 8 in (5.08 m)
- Draft: 13 ft 1 in (3.99 m)
- Installed power: 950 hp (710 kW) (diesel engines); 340 hp (250 kW) (electric motors)
- Propulsion: 2 × NELSECO diesel engines; 2 × Electro Dynamic electric motors; 2 × 60-cell batteries; 2 × Propellers
- Speed: 14 kn (26 km/h; 16 mph) surfaced; 10.5 kn (19.4 km/h; 12.1 mph) submerged
- Range: 4,500 nmi (8,300 km; 5,200 mi) at 10 kn (19 km/h; 12 mph) surfaced; 120 nmi (220 km; 140 mi) at 5 kn (9.3 km/h; 5.8 mph) submerged
- Test depth: 200 ft (61 m)
- Capacity: 18,126 US gal (68,610 L; 15,093 imp gal) fuel
- Complement: 2 officers; 26 enlisted
- Armament: 4 × 18 inch (450 mm) bow torpedo tubes (8 torpedoes)

USS Orca/K-3 (SS-34), also known as "Submarine No. 34", was a K-class submarine, of the United States Navy (USN). Originally named Orca, she was the first ship in the USN named for the orca, though she was renamed K-3 prior to being laid down.

== Design ==
The K-class boats had a length of 153 ft 7 in (46.8 m), a beam of 16 ft 8 in (5.1 m), and a mean draft of 13 ft 1 in (4.0 m). They displaced 451 long tons (458 t), on the surface, and 527 long tons (535 t) submerged. They had a diving depth of 200 feet (61.0 m). The K-class submarines had a crew of 2 officers and 26 enlisted men.

For surface running, the boats were powered by two 475-brake-horsepower (354 kW) NELSECO diesel engines, each driving one propeller shaft. When submerged each propeller was driven by a 170-horsepower (127 kW) electric motor. They could reach 14 kn (26 km/h; 16 mph) on the surface and 10.5 kn (19.4 km/h; 12.1 mph) underwater. On the surface, the boats had a range of 3,150 nmi (5,830 km; 3,620 mi) at 11 kn (20 km/h; 13 mph) and 120 nmi (220 km; 140 mi) at 5 knots (9.3 km/h; 5.8 mph) submerged.

The K-class submarines were armed with four 18 inch (450 mm) torpedo tubes in the bow. They carried four reloads, for a total of eight torpedoes.

== Construction ==
K-3's keel was laid down on 15 January 1912, by the Union Iron Works, in San Francisco, California. Her name had changed from Orca, on 17 November 1911, she was the first US Navy ship named for the orca, another name for the killer whale. She was launched on 14 March 1914, sponsored by Mrs. Clarence Meigs Oddie, and commissioned on 30 October 1914.

== Service history ==
K-3 joined 3rd Submarine Division, Pacific Torpedo Flotilla 11, in December 1914, and operated along the California coast, developing underwater warfare tactics and coordinating the use of underseas craft with the fleet. She arrived in Hawaiian waters 14 October 1915, to perform similar exercises in the light of increasing emphasis on submarine warfare.

The United States' entry into World War I placed a greater urgency on the need for experienced submariners, and K-3 was dispatched to Key West, Florida, arriving 8 January 1918. For the remainder of the war, she conducted patrols along the Florida coast, while training men in underwater techniques. K-3 continued operations along the East Coast after the war, testing new devices such as listening gear, storage batteries, and torpedoes.

== Fate ==
On 7 November 1922, the submarine arrived Hampton Roads, and decommissioned there 20 February 1923. She was scrapped 3 June 1931.

== Bibliography ==
- "Table 21 - Ships on Navy List June 30, 1919". Congressional Serial Set. U.S. Government Printing Office: 766. 1921.
- Priolo, Gary. "Orca / K-3 (SS-34)". Navsource.net.
- Friedman, Norman (1995). U.S. Submarines Through 1945: An Illustrated Design History. Annapolis, Maryland: Naval Institute Press. ISBN 1-55750-263-3.
- Gardiner, Robert & Gray, Randal (1985). Conway's All the World's Fighting Ships 1906–1921. Annapolis, Maryland: Naval Institute Press. ISBN 0-85177-245-5.
- Cressman, Robert J. (8 July 2024). "K-3 (Submarine No. 34)". Dictionary of American Naval Fighting Ships. Navy Department, Naval History and Heritage Command. This article incorporates text from this source, which is in the public domain.
