= USS K-4 =

K-class submarine of the United States

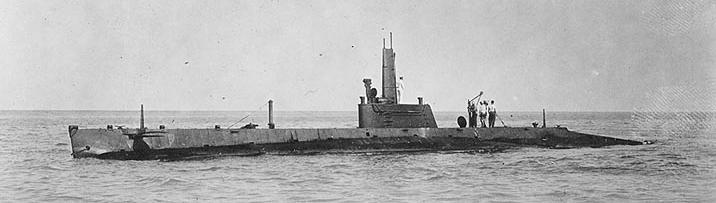
- USS K-4 on sea trials, c. 1914

History

United States
- Name: Walrus
- Namesake: The walrus
- Builder: The Moran Company, Seattle, Washington
- Cost: $544,545.32 (hull and machinery)
- Laid down: 27 January 1912
- Launched: 19 March 1914
- Sponsored by: Mrs. James P. Olding
- Commissioned: 24 October 1914
- Decommissioned: 10 May 1923
- Renamed: K-4 (Submarine No.35), 17 November 1911
- Stricken: 18 December 1930
- Identification: Hull symbol: SS-35 (17 July 1920); Call sign: NYI
- Fate: Sold for scrapping, 3 June 1931

General characteristics
- Class & type: K-class submarine
- Displacement: 392 long tons (398 t) surfaced; 521 long tons (529 t) submerged
- Length: 153 ft 7 in (46.81 m)
- Beam: 16 ft 8 in (5.08 m)
- Draft: 13 ft 1 in (3.99 m)
- Installed power: 950 hp (710 kW) (diesel engines); 340 hp (250 kW) (electric motors)
- Propulsion: 2 × NELSECO diesel engines; 2 × Electro Dynamic electric motors; 2 × 60-cell batteries; 2 × Propellers
- Speed: 14 kn (26 km/h; 16 mph) surfaced; 10.5 kn (19.4 km/h; 12.1 mph) submerged
- Range: 4,500 nmi (8,300 km; 5,200 mi) at 10 kn (19 km/h; 12 mph) surfaced; 120 nmi (220 km; 140 mi) at 5 kn (9.3 km/h; 5.8 mph) submerged
- Test depth: 200 ft (61 m)
- Capacity: 18,126 US gal (68,610 L; 15,093 imp gal) fuel
- Complement: 2 officers; 26 enlisted
- Armament: 4 × 18 inch (450 mm) bow torpedo tubes (8 torpedoes)

USS Walrus/K-4 (SS-35), also known as "Submarine No. 35", was a K-class submarine, of the United States Navy (USN). Originally named Walrus, she was the first ship in the USN named for the walrus, though she was renamed K-4 prior to being laid down.

== Design ==
The K-class boats had a length of 153 ft 7 in (46.8 m), a beam of 16 ft 8 in (5.1 m), and a mean draft of 13 ft 1 in (4.0 m). They displaced 451 long tons (458 t), on the surface, and 527 long tons (535 t) submerged. They had a diving depth of 200 feet (61.0 m). The K-class submarines had a crew of 2 officers and 26 enlisted men.

For surface running, the boats were powered by two 475-brake-horsepower (354 kW) NELSECO diesel engines, each driving one propeller shaft. When submerged each propeller was driven by a 170-horsepower (127 kW) electric motor. They could reach 14 kn (26 km/h; 16 mph) on the surface and 10.5 kn (19.4 km/h; 12.1 mph) underwater. On the surface, the boats had a range of 3,150 nmi (5,830 km; 3,620 mi) at 11 kn (20 km/h; 13 mph) and 120 nmi (220 km; 140 mi) at 5 knots (9.3 km/h; 5.8 mph) submerged.

The K-class submarines were armed with four 18 inch (450 mm) torpedo tubes in the bow. They carried four reloads, for a total of eight torpedoes.

== Construction ==
K-4's keel was laid down on 27 January 1912, by the Moran Company, in Seattle, Washington. Her named had changed from Walrus, on 17 November 1911, she was the first ship of the United States Navy to be named for the walrus, a gregarious, aquatic mammal related to the seal found in Arctic waters. She was launched on 19 March 1914, sponsored by Mrs. James P. Olding, wife of the commanding officer, and commissioned on 24 October 1914.

== Service history ==
Joining the Pacific Torpedo Flotilla, K-4 operated along the coast of California, conducting constant exercises and experiments to develop the techniques of submarine warfare. From 14 October 1915 to 31 October 1917, she carried out similar operations in the Hawaiian Islands. When the United States's involvement in World War I called for increased naval activity, K-4 departed Hawaii for service out of Key West, Florida, arriving 9 January 1918. For the rest of the war, she remained at Key West, where she patrolled the Florida peninsula. After the Armistice with Germany of 11 November 1918, K-4 operated along the East Coast training officers and men for duty in submarines.

== Fate ==
She continued these duties for four years before arriving at Hampton Roads, Virginia, on 24 March 1923. K-4 decommissioned there 10 May 1923, and was sold as scrap on 3 June 1931.

== Bibliography ==
- "Table 21 - Ships on Navy List June 30, 1919". Congressional Serial Set. U.S. Government Printing Office: 766. 1921.
- Priolo, Gary. "Walrus / K-4 (SS-35)". Navsource.net.
- Friedman, Norman (1995). U.S. Submarines Through 1945: An Illustrated Design History. Annapolis, Maryland: Naval Institute Press. ISBN 1-55750-263-3.
- Gardiner, Robert & Gray, Randal (1985). Conway's All the World's Fighting Ships 1906–1921. Annapolis, Maryland: Naval Institute Press. ISBN 0-85177-245-5.
- Cressman, Robert J. (8 July 2024). "K-4 (Submarine No. 35)". Dictionary of American Naval Fighting Ships. Navy Department, Naval History and Heritage Command. This article incorporates text from this source, which is in the public domain.
