= USS K-7 =

K-class submarine of the United States

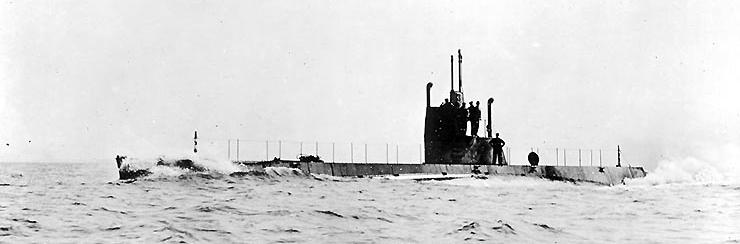
- USS K-7, underway at half speed, on 3 October 1914, probably in the vicinity of San Francisco, California

History

United States
- Name: K-7
- Builder: Union Iron Works, San Francisco, California
- Cost: $527,148.12 (hull and machinery)
- Laid down: 10 May 1912
- Launched: 20 June 1914
- Sponsored by: Mrs. Katie-Bel McGregor
- Commissioned: 1 December 1914
- Decommissioned: 12 February 1923
- Stricken: 18 December 1930
- Identification: Hull symbol: SS-38 (17 July 1920); Call sign: NYL
- Fate: Sold for scrapping, 3 June 1931

General characteristics
- Class & type: K-class submarine
- Displacement: 392 long tons (398 t) surfaced; 521 long tons (529 t) submerged
- Length: 153 ft 7 in (46.81 m)
- Beam: 16 ft 8 in (5.08 m)
- Draft: 13 ft 1 in (3.99 m)
- Installed power: 950 hp (710 kW) (diesel engines); 340 hp (250 kW) (electric motors)
- Propulsion: 2 × NELSECO diesel engines; 2 × Electro Dynamic electric motors; 2 × 60-cell batteries; 2 × Propellers
- Speed: 14 kn (26 km/h; 16 mph) surfaced; 10.5 kn (19.4 km/h; 12.1 mph) submerged
- Range: 4,500 nmi (8,300 km; 5,200 mi) at 10 kn (19 km/h; 12 mph) surfaced; 120 nmi (220 km; 140 mi) at 5 kn (9.3 km/h; 5.8 mph) submerged
- Test depth: 200 ft (61 m)
- Capacity: 18,126 US gal (68,610 L; 15,093 imp gal) fuel
- Complement: 2 officers; 26 enlisted
- Armament: 4 × 18 inch (450 mm) bow torpedo tubes (8 torpedoes)

USS K-7 (SS-38), also known as "Submarine No. 38", was a K-class submarine of the United States Navy(USN). She patrolled in the Gulf of Mexico, during WWI.

== Design ==
The K-class boats had a length of 153 ft 7 in (46.8 m), a beam of 16 ft 8 in (5.1 m), and a mean draft of 13 ft 1 in (4.0 m). They displaced 451 long tons (458 t), on the surface, and 527 long tons (535 t) submerged. They had a diving depth of 200 feet (61.0 m). The K-class submarines had a crew of 2 officers and 26 enlisted men.

For surface running, the boats were powered by two 475-brake-horsepower (354 kW) NELSECO diesel engines, each driving one propeller shaft. When submerged each propeller was driven by a 170-horsepower (127 kW) electric motor. They could reach 14 kn (26 km/h; 16 mph) on the surface and 10.5 kn (19.4 km/h; 12.1 mph) underwater. On the surface, the boats had a range of 3,150 nmi (5,830 km; 3,620 mi) at 11 kn (20 km/h; 13 mph) and 120 nmi (220 km; 140 mi) at 5 knots (9.3 km/h; 5.8 mph) submerged.

The K-class submarines were armed with four 18 inch (450 mm) torpedo tubes in the bow. They carried four reloads, for a total of eight torpedoes.

== Construction ==
K-7's keel was laid down, on 10 May 1912, by the Union Iron Works, at San Francisco, California, under a subcontract from Electric Boat Company, of Groton, Connecticut. She was launched on 20 June 1914, sponsored by Mrs. Katie-Bel McGregor, daughter of the president of Union Iron Works, and commissioned at the Mare Island Navy Yard, on 1 December 1914.

== Service history ==
As a unit of the Pacific Torpedo Flotilla, K-7 sailed for San Diego, California, on 26 December 1914, arriving 28 December, to commence shakedown and training along the California coast. She returned to San Francisco, 4 June 1915, then departed 3 October, for experimental duty in the Hawaiian Islands. Arriving at Pearl Harbor, on 14 October, she conducted torpedo and diving tests, and participated in operations developing the tactics of submarine warfare. K-7 departed Pearl Harbor, 31 October 1917, and sailed via the West Coast, and the Panama Canal, for antisubmarine patrol duty in the Gulf of Mexico.

Arriving at Key West, Florida, on 8 January 1918, K-7 patrolled the shipping lanes of the Gulf of Mexico, from the Florida Keys to Galveston Bay. She returned to Key West, from Galveston, Texas, on 27 November, and resumed training and development operations until departing for Philadelphia Navy Yard, on 14 April 1919. She received an overhaul from 21 April to 10 November, then resumed operations out of Key West, in the Caribbean Sea.

Following additional overhaul during the latter half of 1921, K-7 resumed her training and development operations at the United States Naval Academy, on 19 January 1921. For more than two years, she ranged the eastern seaboard, from Hampton Roads, Virginia, to Provincetown, Massachusetts, training submariners, conducting diving experiments, and practicing underwater warfare tactics. During April and May 1921, she visited the Naval Academy, at Annapolis, Maryland, and the United States Military Academy, at West Point, New York. After conducting almost seven months of submarine instructions at New London, Connecticut, she arrived at Hampton Roads, on 7 September 1922, for submarine flotilla operations in Chesapeake Bay.

== Fate ==
Subsequently, K-7 decommissioned at Hampton Roads, on 12 February 1923. She was towed to Philadelphia, on 23 August 1924. She was struck from the Naval Vessel Register, on 18 December 1930, and sold for scrap, on 3 June 1931.

== Bibliography ==
- "Table 21 - Ships on Navy List June 30, 1919". Congressional Serial Set. U.S. Government Printing Office: 767. 1921.
- Priolo, Gary. "K-7 (SS-38)". Navsource.net.
- Friedman, Norman (1995). U.S. Submarines Through 1945: An Illustrated Design History. Annapolis, Maryland: Naval Institute Press. ISBN 1-55750-263-3.
- Gardiner, Robert & Gray, Randal (1985). Conway's All the World's Fighting Ships 1906–1921. Annapolis, Maryland: Naval Institute Press. ISBN 0-85177-245-5.
- "K-7 (Submarine No. 38)". Dictionary of American Naval Fighting Ships. Navy Department, Naval History and Heritage Command. 8 July 2024. This article incorporates text from this source, which is in the public domain.
