= New London Ship and Engine Company =

- Industry: Diesel engines
- Founded: 1910
- Founder: Lawrence York Spear
- Fate: Dissolved circa 1925
- Headquarters: Groton, Connecticut
- Key people: Lawrence York Spear; Frank Cable; Isaac Rice
- Products: Diesel engines

The New London Ship and Engine Company (NELSECO) was established in Groton, Connecticut as a subsidiary of the Electric Boat Company to manufacture diesel engines.

== History ==
Electric Boat acquired a license to manufacture MAN diesels, approximately in the year 1909. These were initially manufactured by the Fore River Shipyard of Quincy, Massachusetts, where most of Electric Boat's early submarines were built under subcontract. NELSECO was established in Groton to take over diesel manufacturing from Fore River when difficulties were encountered, finishing the work on engines begun by Fore River. It was a subsidiary of the Electric Boat Company for its entire existence. The E- and F-class submarines, launched 1911–12, were initially equipped with these diesels; they were replaced in 1915 as NELSECO's initial efforts were unsatisfactory. The company was incorporated on 11 October 1910, with production starting in July 1911.

The company built the engines for first diesel powered yacht in America, Idealia, launched by the Electric Launch Company (Elco) in 1912. Idealia was owned by ELCO into 1916 and used for demonstrating the application of diesel engines in yachts. The original Idealia installation was a reversible, air started, two cycle engine with six working cylinders and a two-stage air compression cylinder that was rated at 150 horsepower at 550 revolutions per minute. The original two stroke engine was replaced by a NELSECO 120 horsepower four cycle engine by February 1915.

The company was probably disestablished around 1925, as the last United States S-class submarine was completed in that year, and no subsequent US submarines were equipped with NELSECO engines. Electric Boat had a drought in submarine contracts 1918–1931, which probably caused NELSECO's demise.

== Founders ==
- President: Lawrence York Spear
- Vice-president and General Manager: Frank Cable
- Vice-president: Gregory C. Davison
- Secretary and Treasurer: Henry R. Bond
- Directors: Isaac Rice, Elihu B. Frost, Stacey C. Richmond, William H. Reeves and T.A. Scott.

== Legacy ==
Nelseco Navigation Company (a.k.a. Interstate Navigation Co.) operates ferry service to Block Island in Rhode Island. At least two ferries have been named NELSECO. One was launched in 1917 and scrapped circa 1972 and the other was launched in 1981 and scrapped circa 2010.

== See also ==
- Electro-Dynamic Company sister company
- Submarine Boat Company sister company
- Electric Launch Company (Elco) sister company
