= United States Navy submarine bases =

United States Navy submarine military bases

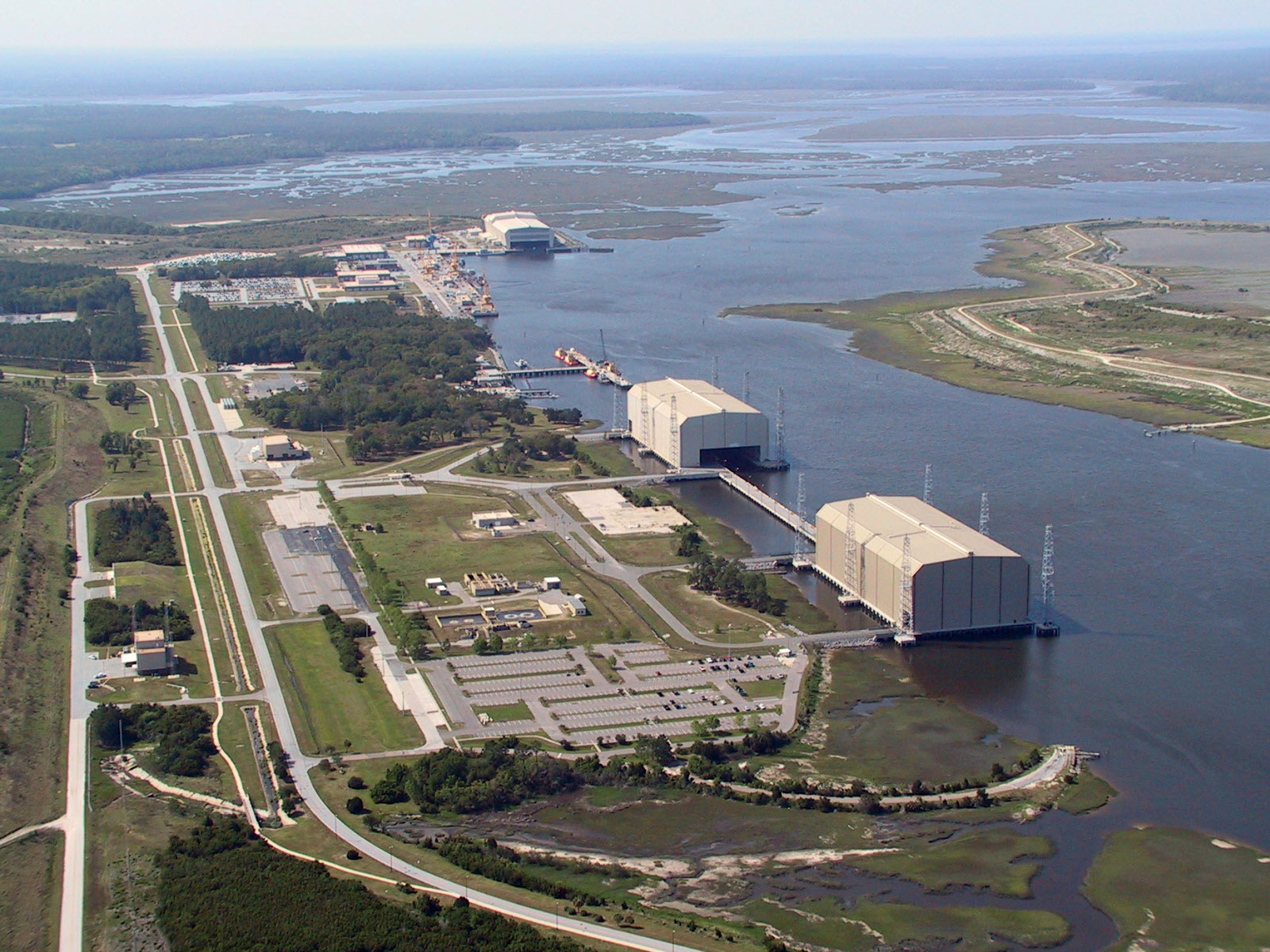
Naval Submarine Base Kings Bay in Camden County, Georgia in April 2001

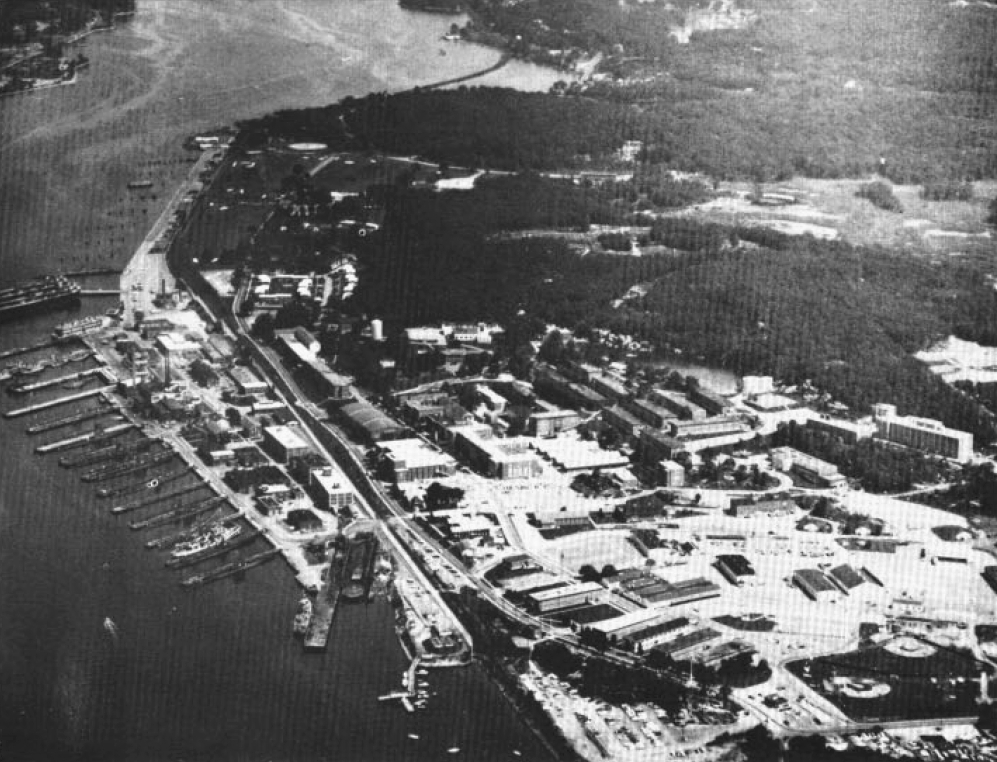
Naval Submarine Base New London in Groton, Connecticut, looking north in a 1968 aerial view

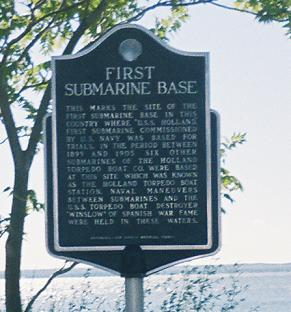
Plaque stating New Suffolk, New York's claim to be the first submarine base.

The United States Navy built permanent and temporary submarine bases around the world to maintain its fleet of submarines and serve the needs of the crews. Submarine bases are military bases that offer good fleet anchorage and are designed to refuel and resupply submarines. The peak number of US submarine bases was during World War II, as the submarine was well suited for fighting in the vast Pacific War, often in enemy waters. Many of the United States submarine bases were closed after the war.

== History ==
The need for US submarine bases was created with the completion of the first submarine USS Holland launched in May 1897. The USS Holland was acquired by the Navy 11 April 1900. On 16 October 1900, the USS Holland departed for her first port, United States Naval Academy at Annapolis, Maryland, for crew training. USS Holland had a crew of one officer, and five enlisted men. Annapolis being a training center was not designated a submarine base, though the USS Holland was stationed there.

The USS Pike and the USS Grampus completed in 1902 were built in San Francisco, California. The Holland Torpedo Boat Company of New York City contracted Union Iron Works to build the two Plunger-class submarines. For three and half years the two submarines operated out of Mare Island Naval Shipyard in San Francisco Bay for training and testing. Mare Island, being a shipyard, also was not designated a submarine base.

The community of New Suffolk, New York, claims to be the first submarine base in the United States. The USS Holland was based at Hamlet's Holland Torpedo Boat Station, open from 1899 to 1905. Seven submarines built by the Holland Torpedo Boat Company were stationed at Hamlet. Torpedo Boat Station, also was not designated a submarine base by the US Navy, being a private company with Navy personnel stationed there.

By January 1911 the Navy had 20 submarines built: Seven A-class submarine, Three B-class submarine, five C-class submarine, three D-class submarine, and two E-class submarines.

United States F-class submarine were built by Electric Boat in 1909. The first two, USS F-1 (SS-20) and *USS F-2 (SS-21), were built by Union Iron Works. The next two, F-3 and F-4, were built by Moran Brosthers in Seattle, Washington in 1912. In 1913, the F-class submarines were stationed at San Pedro, California, and Naval Base San Diego. San Pedro and San Diego also were not designated submarine bases. In 1915, the F-class submarines were stationed at Naval Station Pearl Harbor, also not designated a submarine base. In 1917, F-class submarines were stationed at San Diego and San Diego's Point Loma.

The United States Navy designated Naval Submarine Base New London as the first submarine base. Naval Submarine Base New London was commissioned in 1916 as a dedicated submarine base.

Due to the Japanese hostilities in China and the South Pacific in 1939 the US Congress approved plans for building submarine bases and seaplane bases at Dutch Harbor Alaska, Kodiak, Alaska, Midway Atoll, and Wake Island.

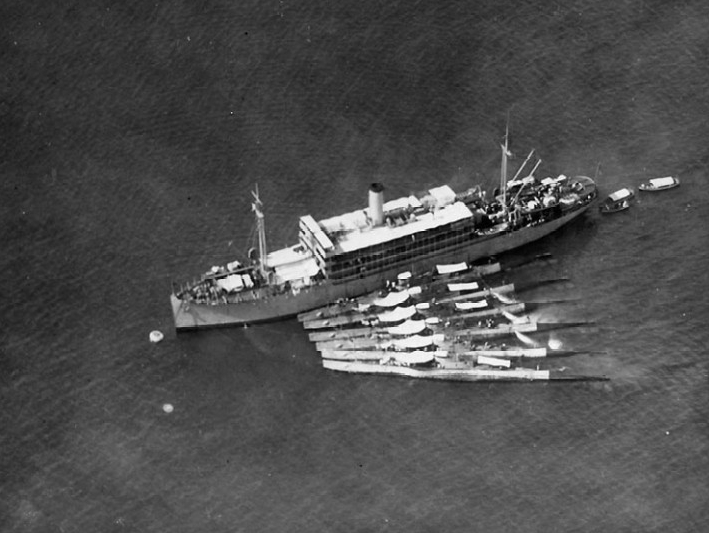
USS Canopus with all six members of Submarine Division 17 in Apra Harbor, Guam, October 1924

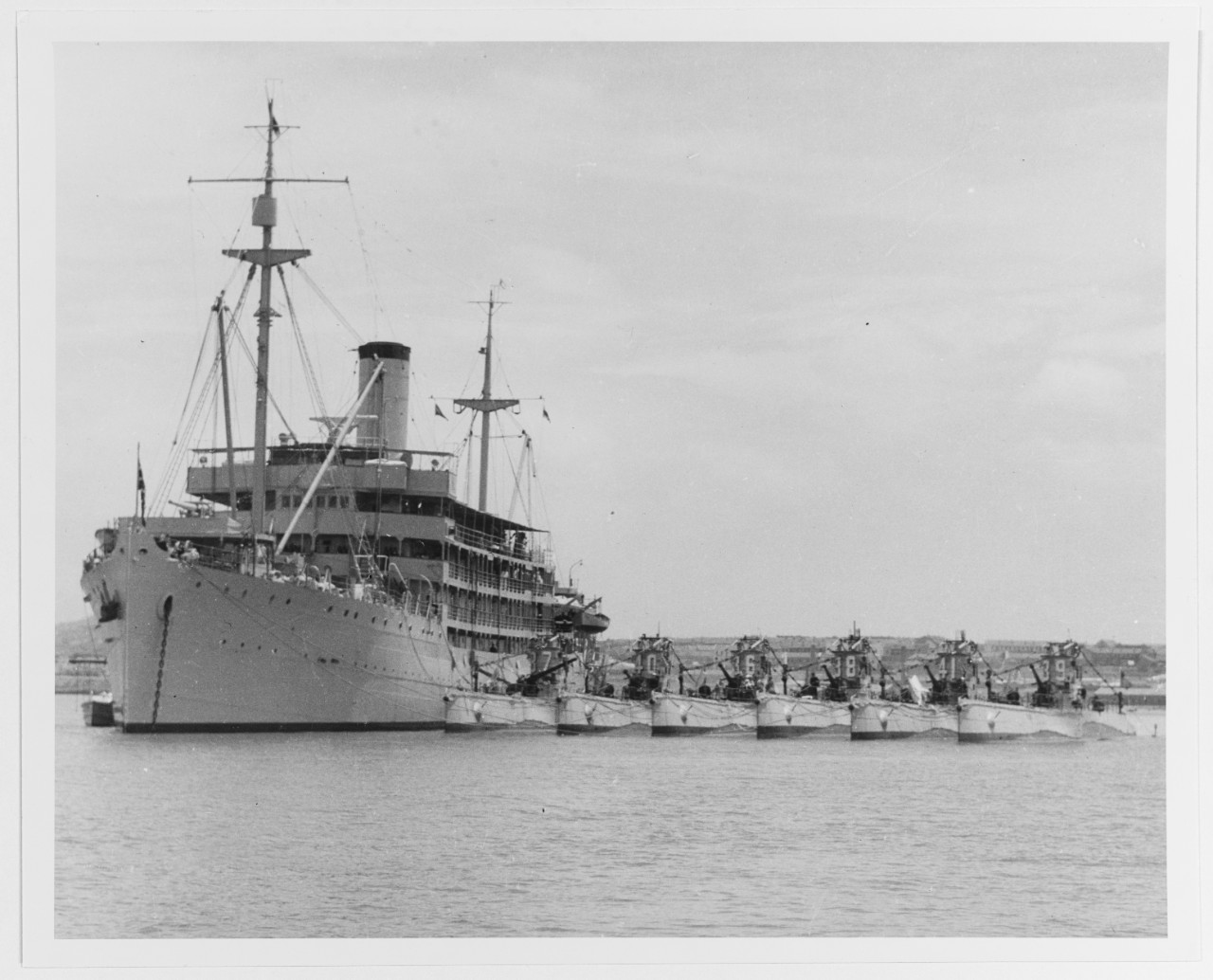
USS Canopus (AS-9) in 1932 with S-37; S-40; S-36; S-38; S-41; S-39 at Naval Base Cavite

The ship USS Wyoming (BM-10) built in 1902 was used as the first submarine tender. The USS Wyoming and other Arkansas-class monitors were converted into submarine tenders, as they had low sides, good for mooring a submarine on her side. The submarine tender refueled and resupplied the submarines. The submarine tender allowed the submarine to operate at its patrol area longer, operating out of advanced bases in the field. This reduced the need to return to permanent bases farther away. Other early submarine tenders, Auxiliary Submarine ship, known as "AS", were USS Alert (AS-4), USS Camden (AS-6) US Rainbow (AS-7) and USS Canopus (AS-9). The USS Beaver was the first purpose built submarine tender, completed in 1918. Other submarine tenders were built by conversions. The demand for submarine bases during World War 2 was so great that many specially built submarine tenders were built. Submarine tenders carried fuel for the submarines, food for the crew, and living quarters for the crew to rest while the sub was being serviced. The ship's depot would have all the supplies that the submarine needed to get back on patrol. Submarine bases that had limited or no land facilities used submarine tender at the advanced submarine bases. The USS Fulton, commissioned on 7 December 1914, was the first of the Fulton-class submarine tenders. Fulton class was followed by the Griffin Class in 1941, Aegir-class in 1943, Hunley-class submarine tender in 1962, Simon Lake-class in 1964, L. Y. Spear-class in 1970, Emory S. Land-class in 1974, Emory S. Land Class in 1979.

The current US Navy fleet of nuclear submarines never need to be refueled. Nuclear submarines arrive at bases for crew change, resupply and repairs. Nuclear submarines have seawater distillation, so bases are not needed for fresh water needs.

== Active bases ==
United States Navy submarine bases:

- Yokosuka Submarine Base (1945–present) at Naval Base Yokosuka, Japan
- Naval Submarine Base Pearl Harbor at Naval Station Pearl Harbor, Hawaii (1917–present)
- Naval Base Guam (1944–present)
- Submarine Base Kings Bay at Camden County, Georgia (1978–present)
- Naval Base Kitsap at Kitsap Peninsula Washington (2004–present)
- Submarine Base New London at Groton, Connecticut (1915–present)
- Naval Station Norfolk at Norfolk, Virginia (1917–present)
- Naval Base Point Loma at Point Loma, San Diego, California (1917–present)
- Naval Support Activity Bahrain at Manama, Bahrain (2014–present), forward base.
- Naval Support Activity Naples (1951–present) – Submarine Group 8 with Sixth Fleet, forward base.

=== Active centers ===
- Submarine School at Submarine Base New London, for Basic Enlisted Submarine School
- Naval Submarine Medical Research Laboratory at New London Submarine Base
- Naval Undersea Warfare Center at Newport, Rhode Island
- Portsmouth Naval Shipyard repair shipyard at Portsmouth, New Hampshire
- Naval Magazine Indian Island, refitted Ohio class missile submarines

== Closed bases ==
Closed United States Navy submarine bases:

- Charleston Naval Shipyard (1902-1996) Submarine Group 6 and Sub Squadron 4
- San Pedro Submarine Base (1917–1923) San Pedro, California
- Naval Air Station Key West (1917–1919), (1942–1945)
- Fremantle submarine base (1942–1945) at Naval Base Perth
- Auxiliary Albany Submarine Base (1942–1944) at Albany, Western Australia
- Brisbane Submarine base at (1942–1945) Naval Base Brisbane
- Naval Base Darwin (1942–1945)
- Cavite Submarine Base (1919-1960s) at Naval Base Cavite, Philippines
- Iliuliuk Submarine Base at Dutch Harbor Naval Operating Base (1941–1945) in Alaska
- Kodiak Naval Operating Base at Womens Bay, Alaska, now Coast Guard Base Kodiak in Alaska
- Wake Submarine Base on Wake Island (11 December 1941– )
- Submarine Base Midway at Naval Air Facility Midway Island
- Majuro Submarine Base (1944–1945)
- Ulithi Submarine Base (1944–1945)
- Eniwetok Submarine Base (1944–1945)
- Coco Solo Submarine Base (1914-1960s) at Panama Canal Zone
- USN Submarine Base, Ordnance Island, Bermuda (1942 to 1945)
- Submarine Base Bangor (1942–2014) at Bangor, Washington (merged into Naval Base Kitsap)
- Exmouth Submarine Base, (1942–1943) advanced submarine base
- Milne Bay Submarine Base in Papua New Guinea (1942–1945) advanced submarine base
- Merauke Submarine Base Dutch New Guinea, advanced submarine base
- Thursday Island Submarine Base, Thursday Island in Torres Strait, Australia advanced submarine base
- Holy Loch Submarine Base (1942–1945) in Scotland (1961 to 1992)
- Naval Station Rota (1964-1979) at Rota, Spain
- Naval Support Activity La Maddalena, La Maddalena, Italy on Santo Stefano Island (1972–2008), advanced submarine base
- St. Thomas Submarine Base on U.S. Virgin Islands at Gregerie Channel next to the air station.

== Gallery ==
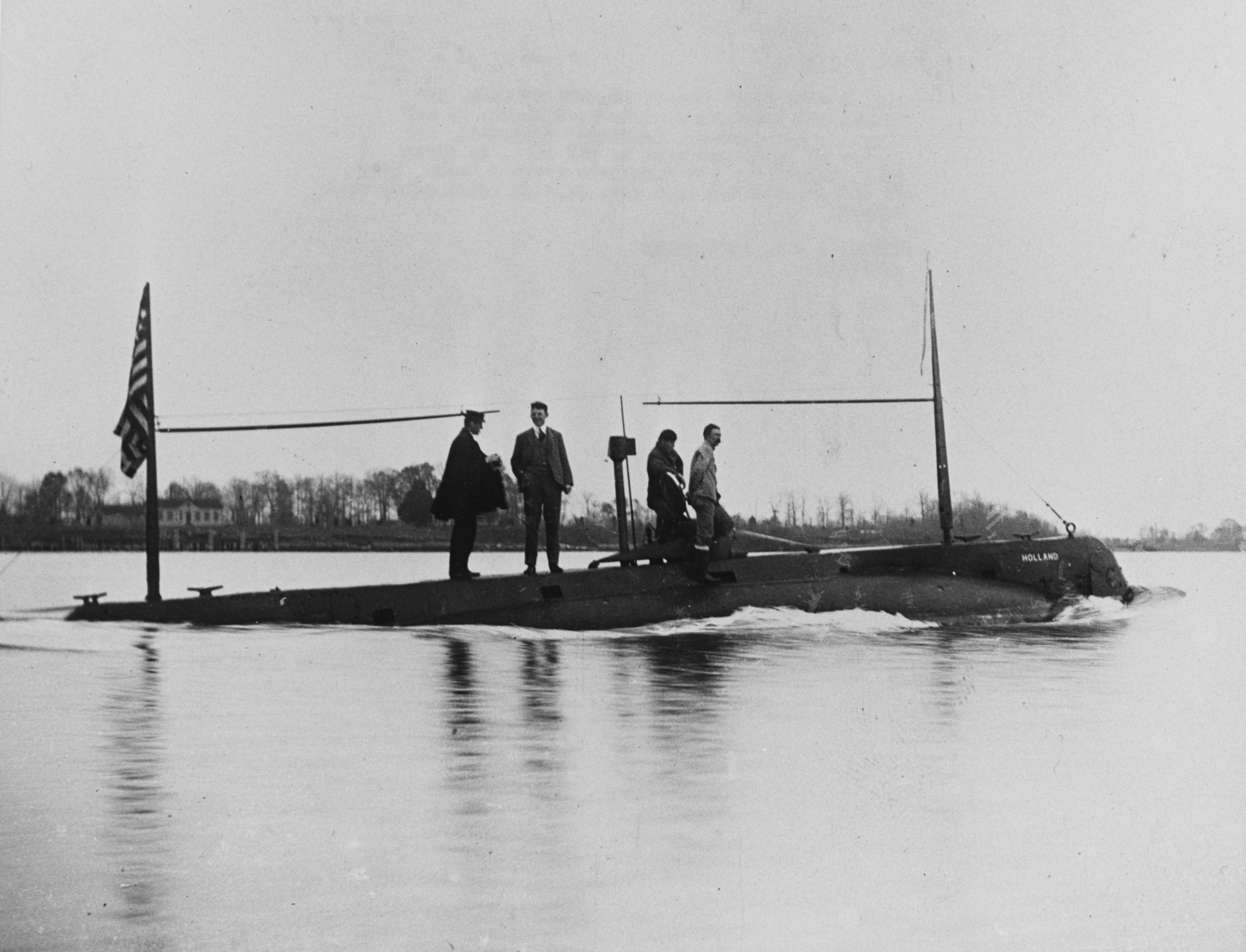
USS Holland (SS-1) underway

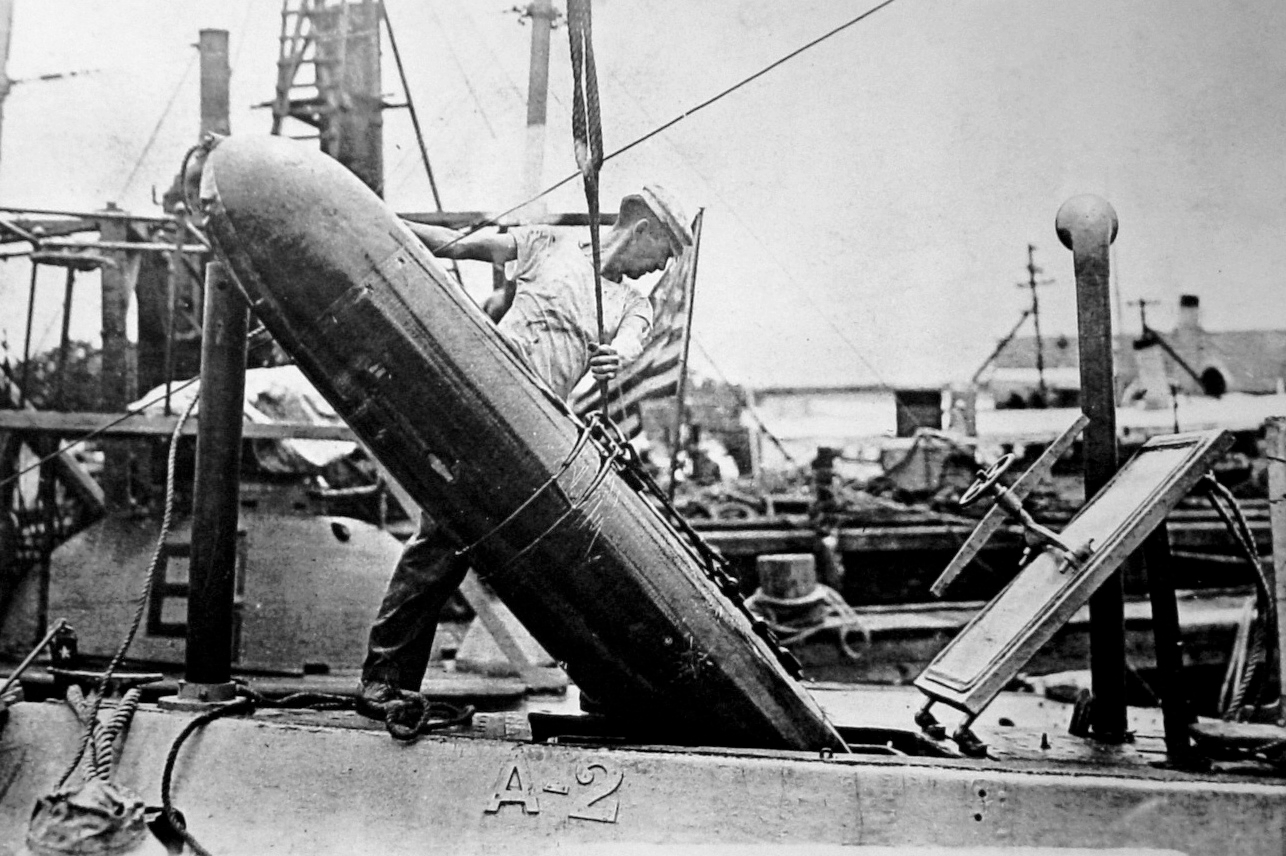
Whitehead torpedo loading into USS Adder A-2

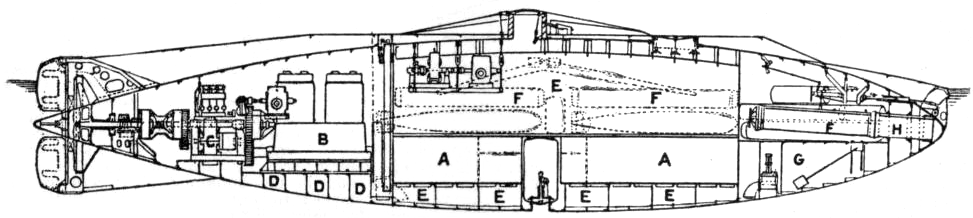
USS Adder

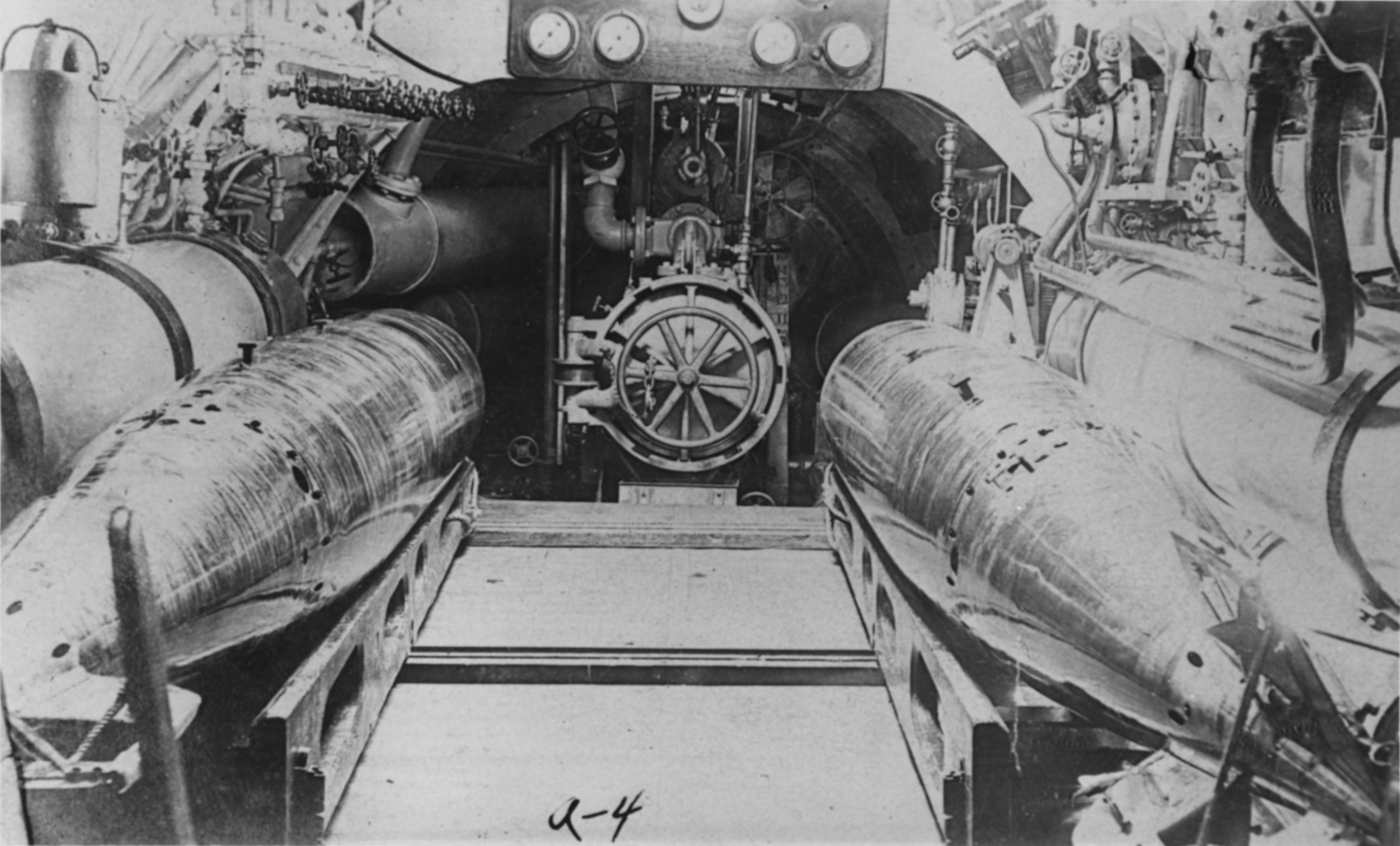
USS Moccasin A-4 torpedo room

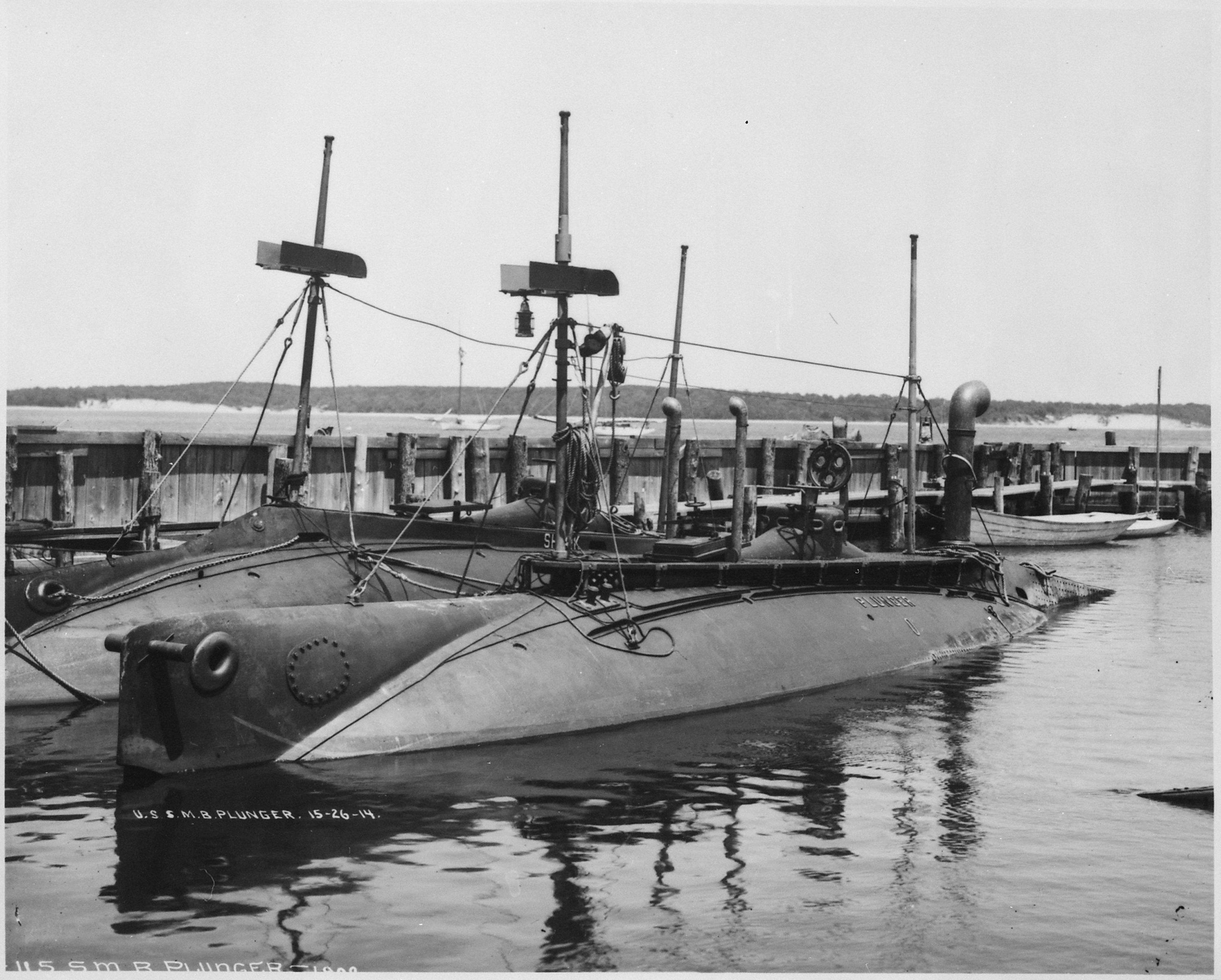
USS Plunger moored beside the USS Shark in 1902

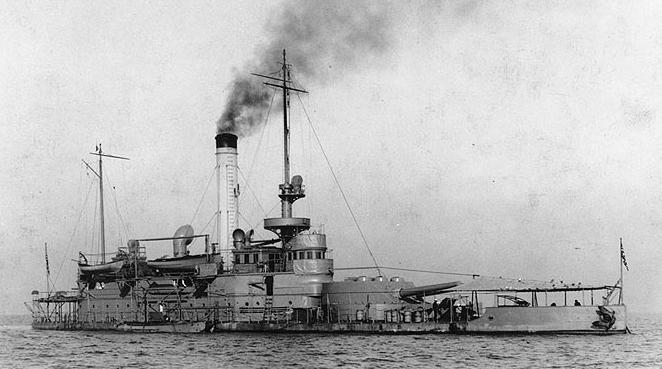
Submarine tender USS Wyoming

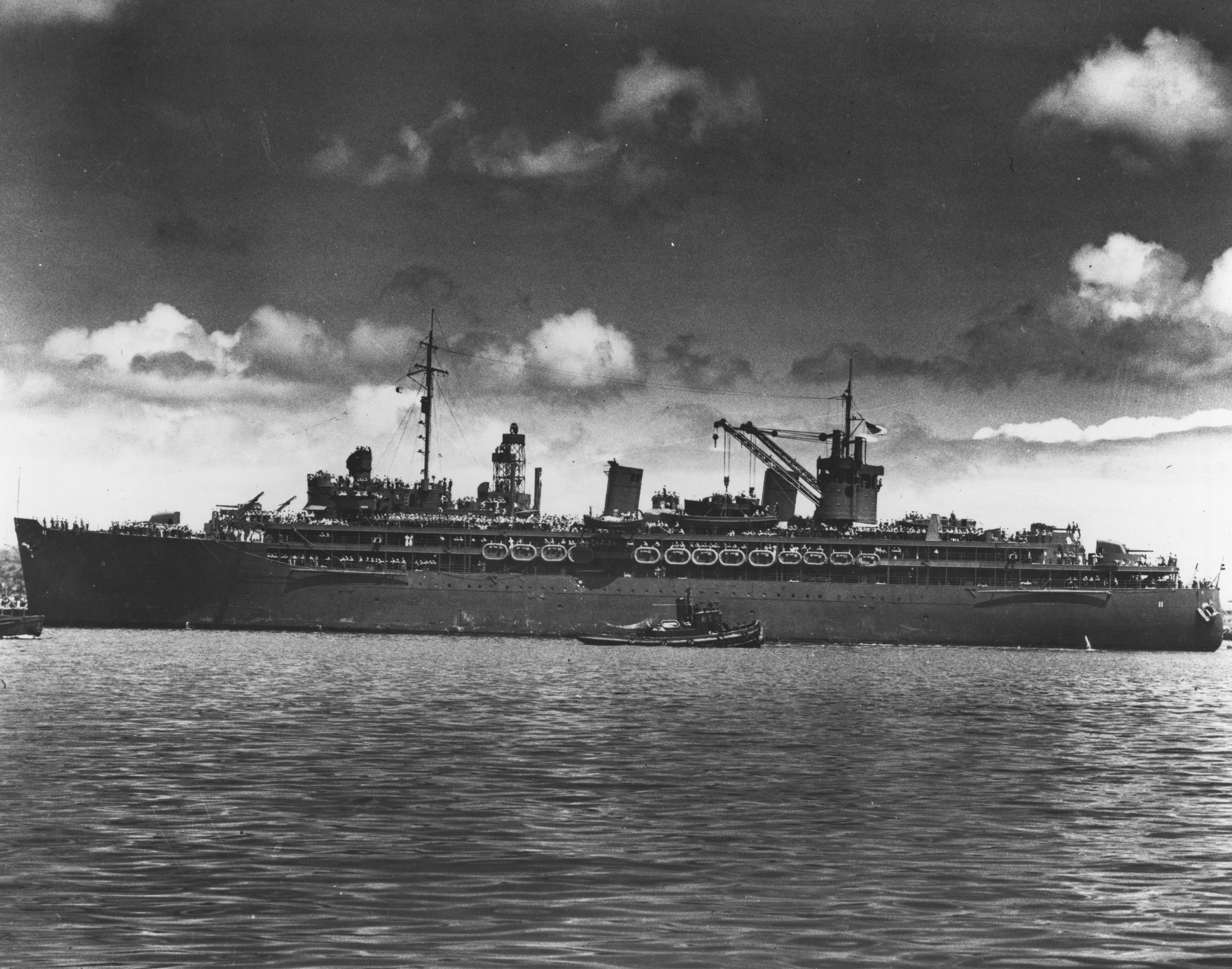
Submarine tender USS Fulton in 1942

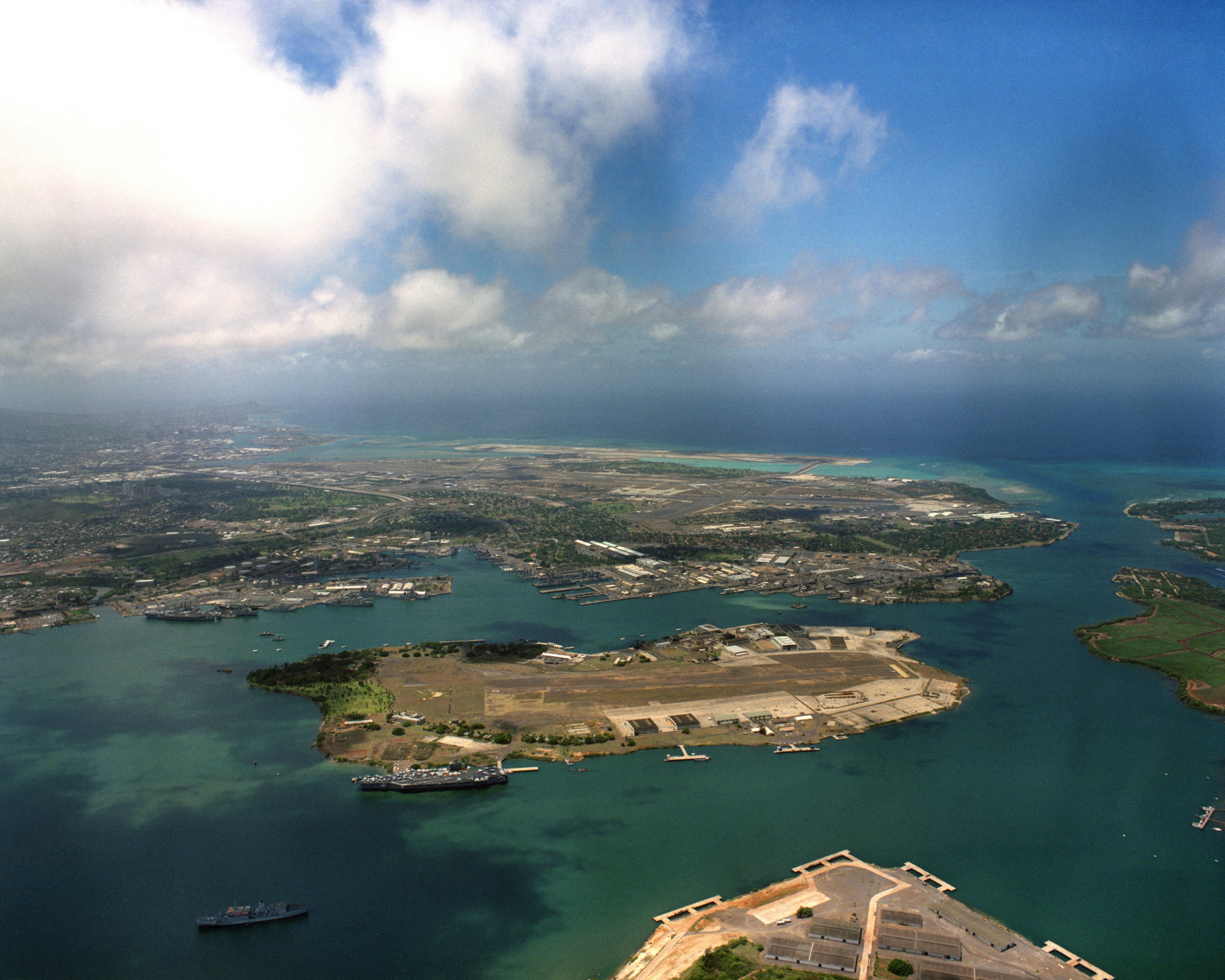
Naval Station Pearl Harbor

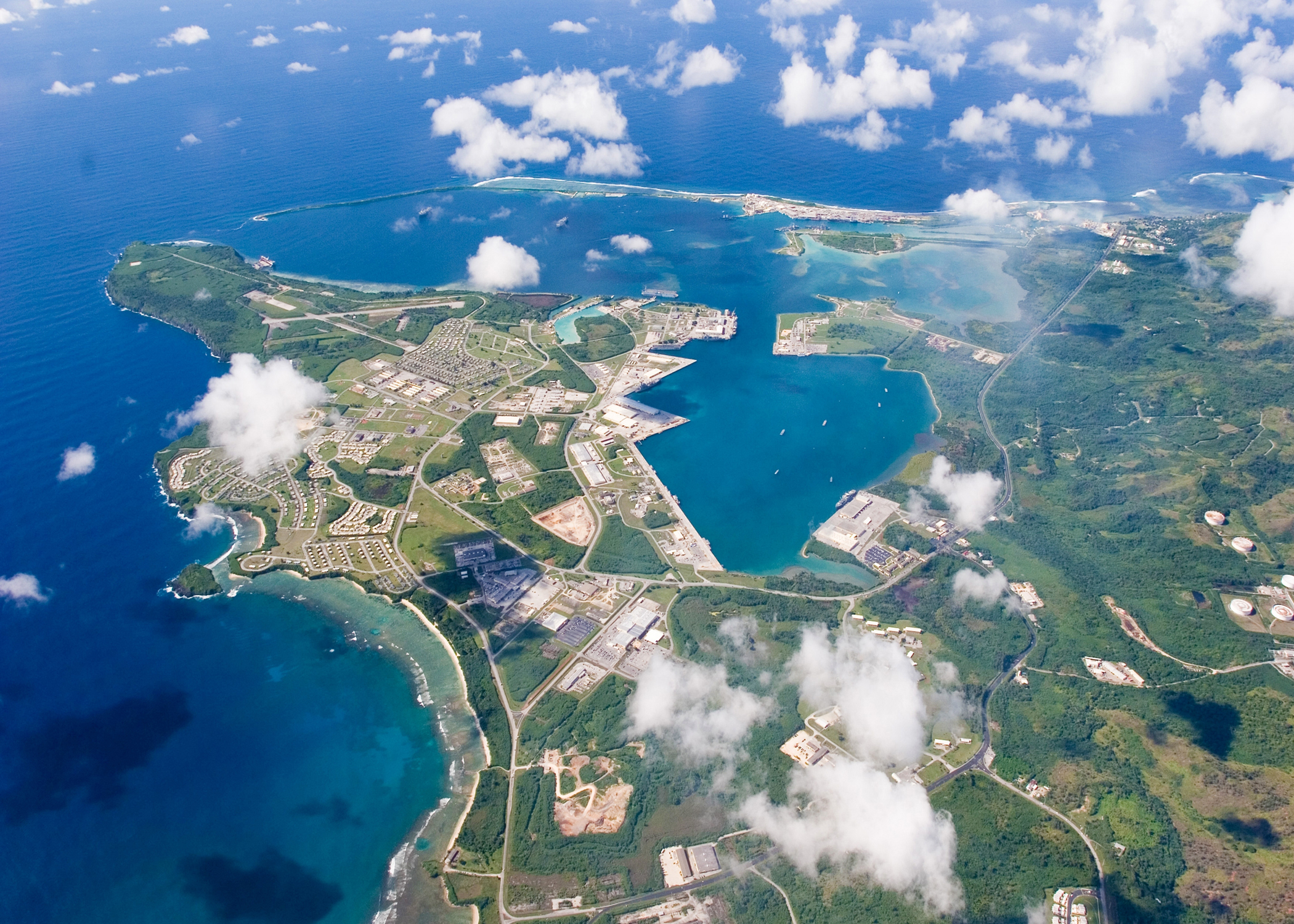
Naval Base Guam

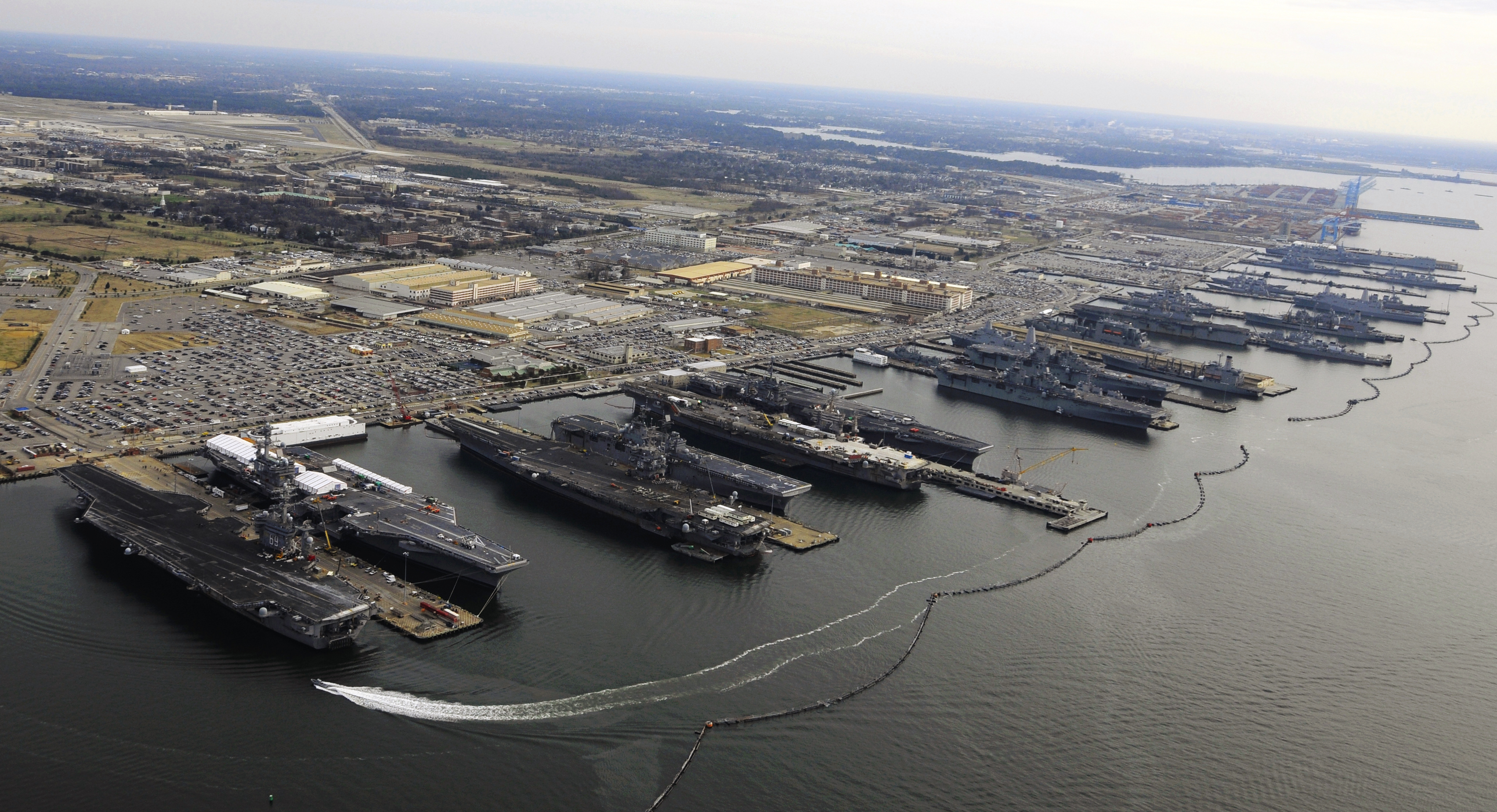
Naval Station Norfolk

Naval Base Point Loma

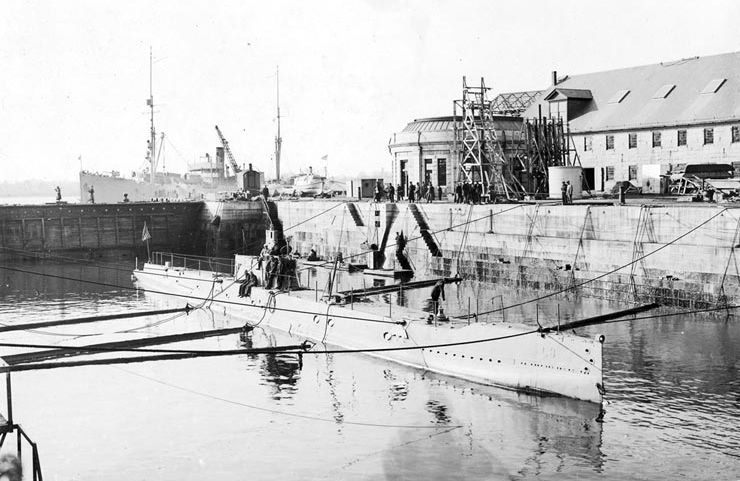
Portsmouth Naval Shipyard with L-8 in 1917, the first submarine built by an US Navy shipyard

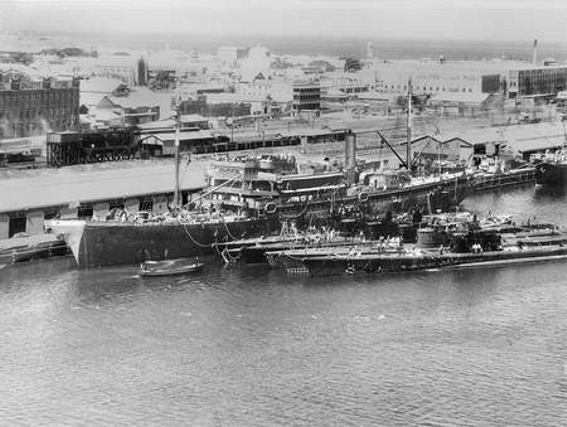
USS Holland (AS-3) tending submarines at Fremantle submarine base, Australia, on 5 March 1942

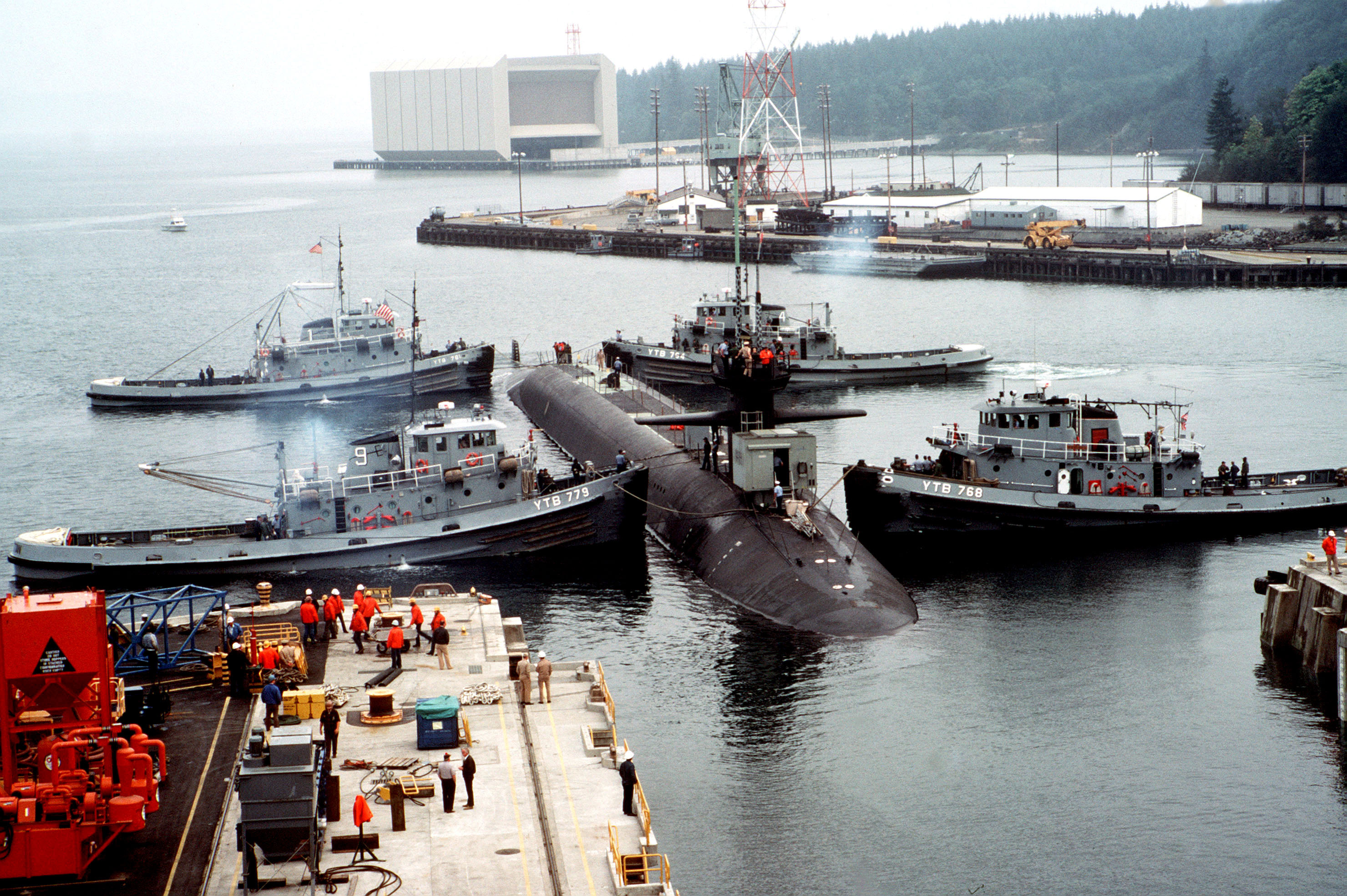
Naval Submarine Base Bangor with tug Mishawaka (rear left) and three other Natick-class tugs guiding the USS Ohio (SSGN-726) out of dry dock at Delta Pier

== See also ==
- US military bases in the Middle East
- Shore facility
- Submarine pen
- Submarines in the United States Navy
- List of countries operating submarines
- List of submarine classes of the United States Navy
- Submarine Force Library and Museum
- Submarine squadron
- US Naval Advance Bases
