= USS Intrepid (1904) =

Steel-hulled bark in the United States Navy

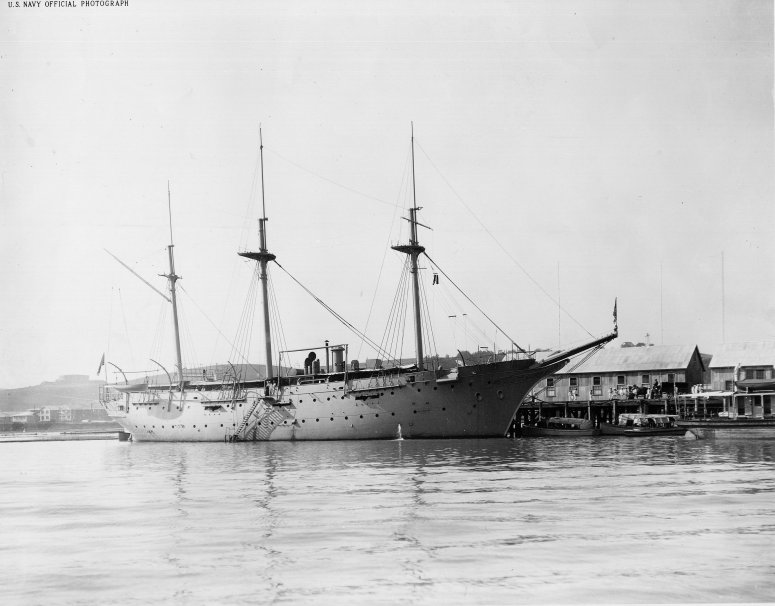

History

United States
- Name: USS Intrepid
- Namesake: The virtue of courage
- Builder: Mare Island Navy Yard, Vallejo, California
- Launched: 8 October 1904
- Commissioned: 16 August 1907
- Decommissioned: 15 October 1914
- Recommissioned: 11 November 1915 in ordinary
- Decommissioned: 30 August 1921
- Fate: Sold for use as barge 20 December 1921; wrecked 23 February 1954.

General characteristics
- Type: Bark
- Tonnage: 1800
- Length: 176 ft 5 in (53.77 m) p/p
- Beam: 45 ft 8 in (13.92 m)
- Draft: 16 ft 5 in (5.00 m)
- Complement: 136 officers and men
- Armament: 6 × 4 in (100 mm) guns; 4 × 6-pounder guns; 2 × 1-pounder guns

The third USS Intrepid was a steel-hulled bark in the United States Navy.

Intrepid's keel was laid down by the Mare Island Navy Yard at Vallejo, California. She was launched on 8 October 1904, sponsored by Miss Helen de Young, and commissioned on 16 August 1907.

Intrepid was assigned to the Yerba Buena Training Station at San Francisco, California, for duty until 28 February 1912, when she became the receiving ship at the same station. The latter assignment lasted until 25 January 1914 when Intrepid became the receiving ship at Mare Island Navy Yard, where she was decommissioned 15 October 1914.

Intrepid was recommissioned in ordinary at Mare Island Navy Yard on 11 November 1915 for use as a barracks for the men of the submarines F-1, F-2, F-3, and F-4 of the United States Pacific Fleet. In 1920 she again became the receiving ship at Mare Island Navy Yard.

Intrepid was decommissioned on 30 August 1921 and was sold on 20 December 1921 for conversion to a commercial barge for the Hawaiian Dredging Company.

Reacquired by the US Navy during World War II, she became Sludge Removal Barge YSR-42 at Pearl Harbor and as such was employed during the salvage of USS Oklahoma.

Returned to commercial service after the war, she was wrecked on the north beach of the Columbia River on 23 February 1954 under the ownership of the Independent Iron Works of Oakland, CA, while being towed to Portland, OR, for sale. Her remains are still visible. 46°15′24″N 123°51′5″W
