= Alfred E. Montgomery =

American vice admiral (1891–1961)

Alfred Eugene Montgomery
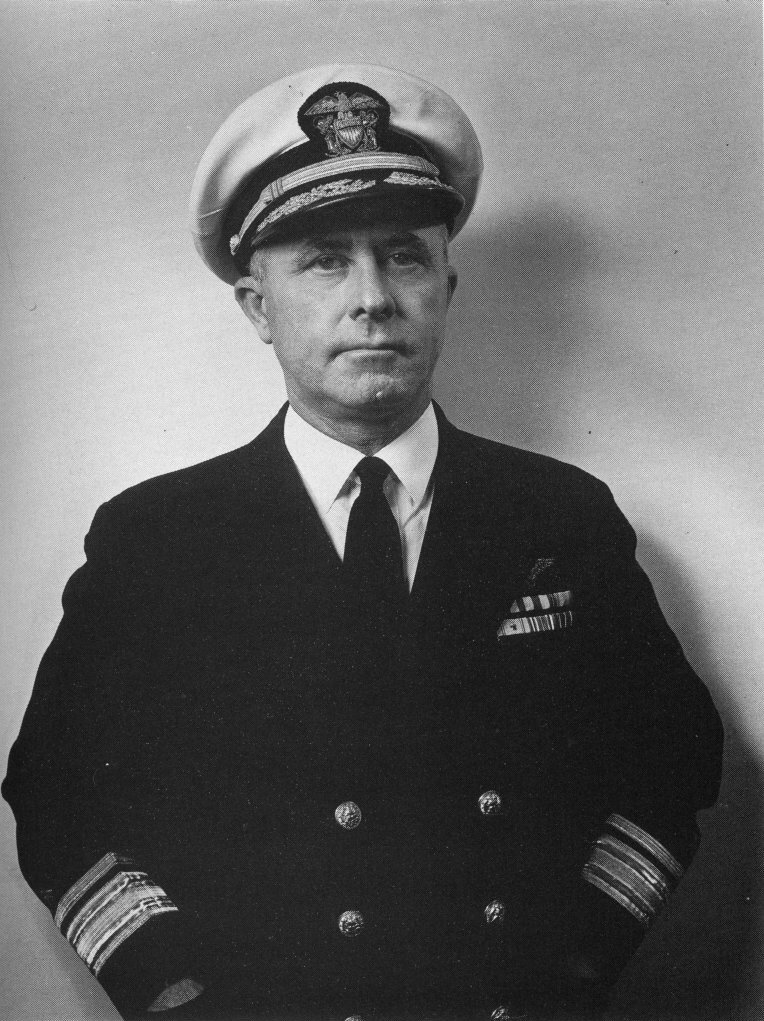
- Montgomery as a rear admiral
- Born: 12 June 1891; Omaha, Nebraska, U.S.
- Died: 15 December 1961 (aged 70); Bremerton, Washington, U.S.
- Military career
- Allegiance: United States of America
- Branch: United States Navy
- Service years: 1912–1951
- Rank: Vice Admiral
- Commands: Alaskan Sea Frontier; 17th Naval District; First Task Fleet; Fifth Fleet; Carrier Division 3 Carrier Division 12; USS Ranger; VT-1; VO-6; VO-1; USS R-20; USS F-1 (SS-20)
- Conflicts: World War I: Veracruz Expedition; World War II: Gilbert and Marshall Islands campaign; Attack on Truk Island; Landings at Hollandia; Mariana and Palau Islands campaign; Battle of the Philippine Sea; Philippines Campaign (1944–1945)
- Awards: Navy Cross; Navy Distinguished Service Medal (3); Legion of Merit (2)

Vice Admiral Alfred Eugene Montgomery (12 June 1891 – 15 December 1961) was an officer in the United States Navy who served in World War I and World War II. A graduate of the Naval Academy, he participated in operations in the Mexican waters during the Mexican Revolution. He trained for submarines, and became executive officer of the submarine USS E-1. In November 1914 he reported to the Mare Island Naval Shipyard where the new submarine USS F-1 was being fitted out, and served as her commander from June 1917 until she was lost on 17 December 1917.

In June 1922, Montgomery qualified as a naval aviator. He commanded observation and torpedo squadrons, and was executive officer of the aircraft carrier USS Ranger from November 1936 until June 1938, and her commanding officer from June 1940 to June 1941. In June 1941, he became chief of staff and aide to Commander Aircraft, Atlantic Fleet. He became commander of Carrier Division 12, flying his flag on USS Essex in August 1943, and commander of Carrier Division 3 in March 1944, with his flag on USS Bunker Hill. As such, he commanded a Task Group of the Fast Carrier Task Force in the Gilbert and Marshall Islands campaign, Battle of the Philippine Sea, and the Philippines campaign. After the war, he commanded the Fifth Fleet and the First Task Fleet.

== Early life ==
Alfred Eugene Montgomery was born in Omaha, Nebraska, on 12 June 1891, the son of Eugene and Julia Smith Montgomery. He was educated in Omaha and at Brookline High School in Massachusetts. He was appointed to the United States Naval Academy at Annapolis, Maryland, from Nebraska in 1908. He graduated with the Class of 1912 on 8 June 1912, and was commissioned as an ensign in 1914. His Naval Academy classmates included future Admirals Daniel E. Barbey, Elliot Buckmaster, Louis E. Denfield, Charles A. Lockwood, Charles P. Mason, DeWitt C. Ramsey, Mahlon Tisdale, Louis Wenzell, and Carleton F. Wright.

His first assignment was to the battleship USS Virginia. He was also assigned as an instructor on the USS Constellation, which was then serving as a training ship at the Naval Training Station, Newport, Rhode Island. Between February 1914 and July 1915 he served on the cruiser USS Tacoma, participating in operations in the Mexican waters during the Mexican Revolution, the cruiser USS Chester and the battleship USS Connecticut.

In July 1915, he joined the submarine service. After a training course on the old monitor USS Tonopah, he became executive officer of the submarine USS E-1. In November 1914 he reported to the Mare Island Naval Shipyard where the new submarine USS F-1 was being fitted out. He served as its commander from June 1917 until 17 December 1917, when F-1 collided with her sister ship USS F-3 during maneuvers, and sank within seconds with the loss of nineteen of her crew.

Montgomery was then assigned to the submarine USS R-20, which was being fitted out at the Union Iron Works in San Francisco. He became its commander when it was commissioned on 26 October 1918. He returned to the Union Iron Works in October 1920 to fit out and commission the USS S-32, but before this occurred he was sent to Mare Island in January 1921 as superintendent of new works in the Machinery Division.

In January 1922, Montgomery reported to the Naval Air Station, Pensacola, Florida, where he qualified as a naval aviator on 8 June 1922. He then became executive officer of VO-2, the observation squadron operating from the aircraft tender USS Aroostook. In 1923 he became commander of VO-1 and then VO-6. After a short period as aide to Captain Walter R. Gherardi, who commanded the Scouting Fleet's aircraft squadrons from the aircraft tender USS Wright, he became commander of the torpedo bomber squadron VT-1. He was posted to the Naval Air Station San Diego as assembly and repair officer in 1925, becoming its executive officer the next year. He then returned to sea as head of the air department on the aircraft carrier USS Langley. In July 1929, he became commander of VT-2 on the USS Saratoga.

Following the usual pattern of alternating sea and shore duty, he commanded the Naval Air Station Seattle from August 1930 to May 1932. From July 1932 until May 1933 he was an aviation officer on the Staff of Commander Cruisers, Scouting Force, on its flagship, USS Chicago. He then became the head of the Aviation Section, Ship's Movement Division in the Office of the Chief of Naval Operations at the Navy Department in Washington, D.C., and commanded the Naval Air Station Anacostia from July 1934 to February 1936.

He returned to sea in February 1936 as plans and operations officer on the staff of Commander Aircraft, Battle Force, Rear Admiral Henry V. Butler, and later Rear Admiral Frederick J. Horne. He was executive officer of the aircraft carrier USS Ranger in November 1936 until June 1938, and of Naval Air Station San Diego again from July 1938 to July 1939.

== World War II ==
Montgomery served as head of the Flight Division in the Bureau of Aeronautics in the Navy Department from July 1939 until June 1940, when he assumed command of Ranger. In June 1941 he became Chief of Staff and Aide to the Commander Aircraft, Atlantic Fleet, subsequently redesignated Commander Carriers, Atlantic Fleet, Rear Admiral Arthur B. Cook. He was serving in this post when the United States entered World War II after the bombing of Pearl Harbor in December 1941. In this role, he was preoccupied with hunting and sinking German U-boats in the Atlantic.

Promoted to rear admiral in May 1942, Montgomery became commander of the Naval Air Station Corpus Christi in June, and then the Naval Air Training Center there in November. For his service at Corpus Christi, he was awarded the Legion of Merit. His citation read:

Assigned the task of transforming a training station with auxiliary fields to a training center with seven individual commands, (he) achieved distinctive success in executing a program involving vast expansion of facilities and personnel.

In August 1943 he became commander of Carrier Division 12, flying his flag on USS Essex. AS such he led the raid on Wake Island on 5–6 October 1943, his force being designated Task Force 14. He became commander of Carrier Division 3 in March 1944, with his flag on USS Bunker Hill. As such, he commanded a Task Group of the Fast Carrier Task Force, which was known as Task Force 58 when part of the Fifth Fleet and Task Force 38 when part of the Third Fleet. During the Gilbert and Marshall Islands campaign he led Task Group 50.3, with the carriers Essex, Bunker Hill and Independence. His Task Group attacked Rabaul on 11 November, and then bombed Tarawa for three days from 18 to 20 November. For his part in the campaign, he was awarded the Navy Distinguished Service Medal:

As Commander of a Carrier Task Group in action against enemy Japanese forces in the Central and South Pacific Areas from November 18 to December 10, 1943 ... (He) directed the operations of his Task Group in repeated aerial attacks against Tarawa, Gilbert Islands, through the preparatory periods and in support of the subsequent landings, greatly assisting our forces in the successful occupation of this strategic island ... carried out numerous vital air raids on Japanese shipping, aircraft and installations on Kwajalein Atoll, Marshall Islands, despite a persistent hostile night attack lasting five hours ... and previous operations against Rabaul, New Britain, and Wake Island, contributed in large measure to our ultimate victories in the Pacific Areas ...

For a raid on Saipan, Montgomery was award the Navy Cross:

For extraordinary heroism as Officer in Tactical Command of a Carrier Task Group, in action ... in the vicinity of Saipan, February 12, 1944. With his task group subjected to repeated attacks by enemy torpedo and bomber planes, (he) ... skillfully and successfully directed their gunfire and combat air patrols in destroying seventeen hostile planes ... delivered damaging attacks against enemy shipping, aircraft and shore installations and ... also obtained valuable photographs. By his outstanding leadership and excellent tactical ability, (he) brought his task group undamaged through this engagement ...

For the Mariana and Palau Islands campaign, Montgomery led Task Group 58.2, with the Bunker Hill, Wasp, Monterey and Cabot. While his forces won a great victory in the Battle of the Philippine Sea, Montgomery, in his report on the battle, expressed his opinion that:

results of the battle were extremely disappointing to all hands, in that important units of the enemy fleet, which came out in the open for the first time in over a year and made several air attacks on our superior force, were able to escape without our coming to grips with them.

Montgomery was awarded a second Navy Distinguished Service Medal for his part:

as commander of a Task Group of Carriers and screening vessels in operations against the Japanese forces from March through June 1944. In attacks on Palau ... Marcus and Wake ... the aircraft under his command inflicted great damage on enemy shipping and shore installations. At Hollandia ... his task group contributed invaluable assistance to the Amphibious forces engaged in establishing a beachhead and continued to support advances on land after the beachhead was firmly in our hands. At Truk ... finally in the battle for the Marianas and in the attacks on the Japanese fleet in June, 1944 his forces participated in the decisive destruction of Japanese air resistance and inflicted damaging blows on the important fleet units.

A third Navy Distinguished Service Medal was awarded for the Philippines campaign:

as Commander of Task Group 38.1, operating against enemy Japanese forces in the Philippine Islands Area from October 30, 1944, to December 29, 1944. After effectively organizing and expeditiously developing the forces of his command (he) ably directed his group in highly successful concentrated operations against the enemy, inflicting severe and costly damage on the aircraft, shipping and shore installations at Leyte, Manila and Luzon. By his superb professional skill in all the phases of aerial warfare and his capable leadership, he inspired the men of his command to maximum effort throughout this critical period and contributed to the sustained prosecution of the war in this vital theater ...

Montgomery became Commander Fleet Air, West Coast, with his headquarters at the Naval Air Station, San Diego, in January 1945. He tried to bring his experiences in combat to bear in his new role, which involved supplying the combat units with men and equipment. For his services in this job, he was awarded a second Legion of Merit. In July 1945 he became commander of Pacific Fleet Air Forces, with the rank of vice admiral.

== Later life ==
After the war, Montgomery became commander of the Fifth Fleet in August 1946, flying his flag from the command ship USS Appalachian. The position of commander of the Fifth Fleet then became commander of First Task Fleet, on 1 January 1947. He then became commander of the First Task Fleet in July 1947, flying his flag from the battleship USS Iowa. He reverted to his permanent rank of rear admiral in August 1947, and became commander of the Alaskan Sea Frontier and the 17th Naval District. He commanded the U.S. Naval Base Bermuda from 1949 to 1950. His last command, in February 1950, was Commander Fleet Air, at Jacksonville, Florida. He retired in July 1951, upon which he was given a tombstone promotion to vice admiral.

Montgomery died at the Naval Hospital in Bremerton, Washington, on 13 December 1961, at the age of 70. He was survived by his wife, Alice Claire Smith Montgomery, and his daughter Anne. His son, Lieutenant Brooke Montgomery, was killed in a plane crash on 1 February 1956.
