= SS21 =

SS21 or variation, may refer to:

- OTR-21 Tochka, a Soviet short-range ballistic missile with the NATO designation "SS-21 Scarab"
- USS F-2 (SS-21), a United States Navy submarine which served during World War I
- Chilean submarine Simpson (SS-21), several submarines of the navy of Chile
- Higashi-Murayama Station (station code SS21), Higashimurayama, Tokyo, Japan; a train station
- SS21, a district of Damansara Utama, Petaling Jaya, Selangor, Malaysia
- SS21 The Healing, a LOVERBOY fashion label fashion collection by Charles Jeffrey (fashion designer)
- 21st Waffen Mountain Division of the SS Skanderbeg (21st SS division; S.S. 21) of Albanian partisans serving Germany in WWII

== See also ==
- SS-N-21 "Sampson", a Soviet submarine launched ballistic missile
