= United States allies in the Middle East =

The United States has strategic diplomatic, military, and economic relationships with several Middle Eastern countries. The United States has many regional allies, the most important of which are Israel, Saudi Arabia, Qatar, Turkey, and the United Arab Emirates.

Under this strategic umbrella, Egypt, Bahrain, and Kuwait are also important military allies, and U.S. personnel regularly train Iraq's armed forces. Both Jordan and Oman have military bases on their soil and have stable ties with the United States. Following the political transition and the fall of Bashar al-Assad, the United States has also moved to cultivate diplomatic ties with Syria.

== History ==
The United States alliances in the Middle East developed after World War II, shifting from oil access and anti-colonialism to Cold War containment, regional stability, and counterterrorism. The Iranian Revolution and Soviet invasion of Afghanistan prompted the creation of the U.S. Central Command (CENTCOM) in 1983 to protect regional energy flows and allies.

During the 2026 Iran war, US allies in the Middle East were attacked by Iran.

== Major US-aligned countries ==
=== Saudi Arabia ===
Saudi Arabia is a core regional partner that hosts U.S. military infrastructure and is a major non-NATO ally, though it has also pursued independent diplomatic and defense frameworks.

=== United Arab Emirates ===
The United Arab Emirates (UAE) hosts vital U.S. military assets and normalized relations with Israel under the Abraham Accords.

=== Qatar ===
Qatar is home to the massive Al Udeid Air Base, serving as a primary hub for U.S. operations in the region.

=== Bahrain ===
Bahrain hosts the U.S. Navy's Fifth Fleet and holds major non-NATO ally status.

=== Kuwait ===
Kuwait is a key military partner since the Gulf War that hosts multiple U.S. installations.

=== Egypt ===
Egypt is a long-standing recipient of U.S. military aid and a major non-NATO ally playing a central diplomatic role in regional peace efforts.

=== Jordan ===
Jordan is a close security partner and major non-NATO ally that frequently hosts U.S. training exercises and forces.

=== Oman ===
Oman maintains cooperative defense ties and port-access agreements with the United States.

=== Israel ===
Israel is a close military and strategic ally of the United States in the Middle East.

=== Turkey ===
Turkey acts as a vital regional power and strategic ally of the United States in the Middle East, which deepened its security ties through the Mecca Defence Alliance signed with Saudi Arabia and Pakistan.

== See also ==
- United States military bases in the Middle East
- Arab–American relations
- United States foreign policy in the Middle East
