= United States military bases in the Middle East =

US bases in the Middle East

The United States stations between 40,000 and 50,000 military personnel across more than 20 sites balancing massive, publicly acknowledged regional hubs with smaller, highly discreet austere desert outposts in a 1,500-mile arc stretching from Jordan to Oman in the Middle East. Iran damaged at least 20 US military bases in the Middle East during the 2026 Iran War, with some analysts saying as many as 28 US military bases were hit. This has led the Pentagon to weigh a smaller U.S. military presence in the Persian Gulf once the Iran war ends instead of rebuilding strike-battered bases.

== History ==
The United States military bases in the Middle East expanded significantly beginning in 1980 under the Carter Doctrine, evolving from early World War II logistics hubs into an extensive network across the Persian Gulf and surrounding regions.

=== 2026 Iran war ===
Following the 2026 Iran war, Iranian missile and Iranian drone strikes have damaged many U.S. military sites across the Middle East, with some analysts saying as many as 28 US military bases were hit, though destruction of entire base installations has not occurred as U.S. and allied air defences intercept most of the incoming fire. Facilities like the U.S. Naval Support Activity base in Bahrain (headquarters of the 5th Fleet) and Ali Al Salem Air Base in Kuwait suffered structural damage to maintenance areas, command posts, or communication terminals, despite successful interceptions by regional air defences. US 5th Fleet Naval base in Bahrain was rendered inoperable, with US Navy secretary Hung Cao saying that Iran "blew the hell" out of U.S. base in Bahrain. According to a Washington Post analysis in May 2026, over 217 structures and 11 pieces of equipment were damaged or destroyed at U.S. bases in the Middle East by Iran. U.S. bases in Kuwait suffered severe damage from Iranian attacks during the 2026 Iran war.

== Active bases ==
=== Qatar ===
Al Udeid Air Base in Qatar is the largest U.S. base in the Middle East, housing about 10,000 troops and serving as the forward headquarters for U.S. Central Command (CENTCOM).

=== Kuwait ===
Kuwait hosts the largest troop contingent with roughly 13,000 personnel at installations like Camp Arifjan, Camp Buehring, Ahmed Al Jaber Air Base and Ali Al Salem Air Base.

=== Bahrain ===
Bahrain is home to the U.S. Navy's Fifth Fleet headquarters, providing vital deep-water port access for naval operations.

=== United Arab Emirates ===
Al Dhafra Air Base in the United Arab Emirates supports key U.S. Air Force and drone operations.

=== Saudi Arabia ===
Prince Sultan Air Base located in Al Kharj, Saudi Arabia, hosts around 2,300 personnel and houses integrated air defense systems like Patriot missiles.

=== Jordan ===
Muwaffaq Salti Air Base in Azraq, Jordan hosts significant air wing and expeditionary assets.

=== Israel ===
The United States does not have large permanent combat bases in Israel, but it operates a small, classified radar and housing facility known as Site 512.

=== Turkey ===
A clandestine site called Site K, the Kürecik Radar Station, near Malatya, Turkey exists.

=== Oman ===
The United States does not have exclusive, permanent U.S.-owned military bases in Oman, but instead uses a strategic access agreement allowing U.S. forces to use specific Omani airfields and port facilities such as Duqm Port.

=== Cyprus ===
The United States does not have its own sovereign military bases in Cyprus, but U.S. forces use and help fund local and British-run facilities on the island.

=== Egypt ===
The United States does not have a permanent, official combat base in Egypt, but American military personnel utilize logistical and support facilities at locations like Cairo West Air Base.

== Closed bases ==
=== Yemen ===
The U.S. used Al-Anad Air Base in the Lahij Governorate of Yemen for counterterrorism and drone operations against Al-Qaeda in the Arabian Peninsula (AQAP). U.S. forces withdrew from the facility in 2015 following deteriorating security and the Houthi takeover of Yemen.

=== Iraq and Syria ===
The US fully withdrew from Syria in April 2026, and similarly withdrew from Iraq in September 2026.

=== Kurdistan Region ===
The United States military withdrew from its remaining bases in the Kurdistan Region, including facilities near Erbil International Airport and Harir Air Base, ahead of a total closure planned for September 2026.

== See also ==
- United States Navy submarine bases
- 2026 Iranian strikes on Arab countries
