= USS F-4 =

F-class submarine of the U.S. Navy, in service from 1912 to 1915

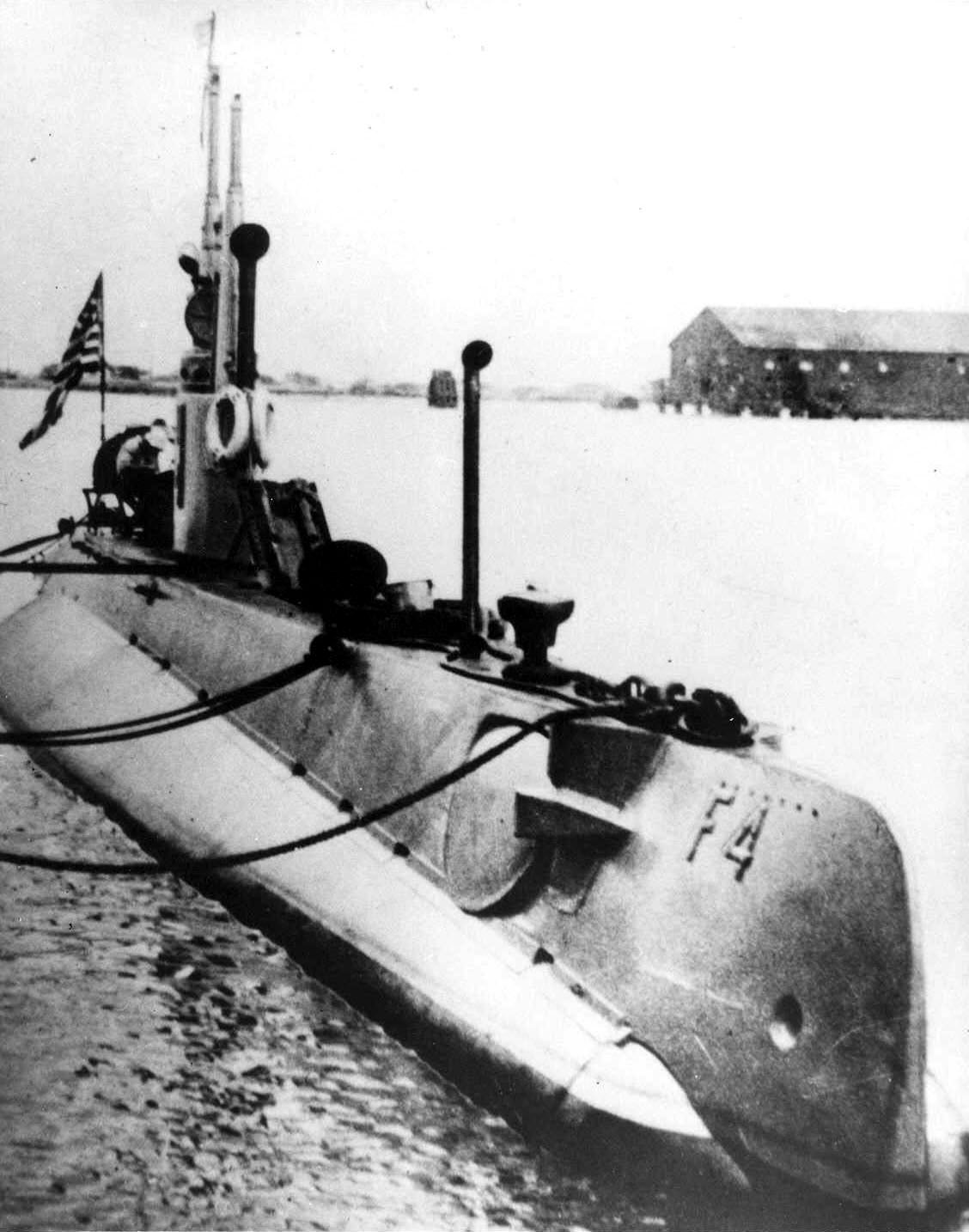
- USS F-4, ex-Skate, c. 1913-1915

History

United States
- Name: Skate
- Namesake: The skate
- Builder: The Moran Company, Seattle, Washington
- Laid down: 21 August 1909
- Launched: 6 January 1912
- Sponsored by: Mrs. Manson Franklin Backus
- Commissioned: 3 May 1913
- Renamed: F-4 (Submarine No.23), 17 November 1911
- Stricken: 31 August 1915
- Identification: Hull symbol: SS-23 (17 July 1920); Call sign: NSO
- Fate: Foundered, 25 March 1915
- Notes: Raised, 29 August 1915, but not placed back in service

General characteristics
- Class & type: F-class submarine
- Displacement: 330 long tons (335 t) surfaced; 400 long tons (406 t) submerged
- Length: 142 ft 6 in (43.43 m)
- Beam: 15 ft 5 in (4.70 m)
- Draft: 12 ft 2 in (3.71 m)
- Installed power: 780 hp (582 kW) diesel; 620 hp (462 kW) electric
- Propulsion: 2 × NELSECO diesel engines; 2 × Electro Dynamic electric motors; 2 × 60-cell batteries; 2 × Propellers
- Speed: 13.5 kn (25.0 km/h; 15.5 mph) surfaced; 11.5 kn (21.3 km/h; 13.2 mph) submerged
- Range: 2,300 nmi (4,300 km; 2,600 mi) at 11 kn (20 km/h; 13 mph) surfaced; 100 nmi (190 km; 120 mi) at 5 knots (9.3 km/h; 5.8 mph) submerged
- Test depth: 200 ft (61 m)
- Capacity: 11,500 US gal (44,000 L; 9,600 imp gal) fuel
- Complement: 1 officers; 21 enlisted
- Armament: 4 × 18 inch (450 mm) bow torpedo tubes (4 torpedoes)

USS Skate/F-4 (SS-23), also known as "Submarine No. 22", was an F-class submarine in the United States Navy (USN). She was the first ship of the United States Navy to be named for the skate, though she was renamed F-4 prior to launching. Commissioned in 1913, she operated in the Pacific Ocean, until she sank accidentally in 1915, the first commissioned submarine of the US Navy to be lost at sea.

== Design ==
The F-class boats had an overall length of 142 ft 7 in (43.5 m), a beam of 15 ft 5 in (4.7 m), and a mean draft of 12 ft 2 in (3.7 m). They displaced 330 long tons (340 t) on the surface and 400 long tons (410 t) submerged with a diving depth of 200 ft (61.0 m). The F-class submarines had a crew of 1 officer and 21 enlisted men.

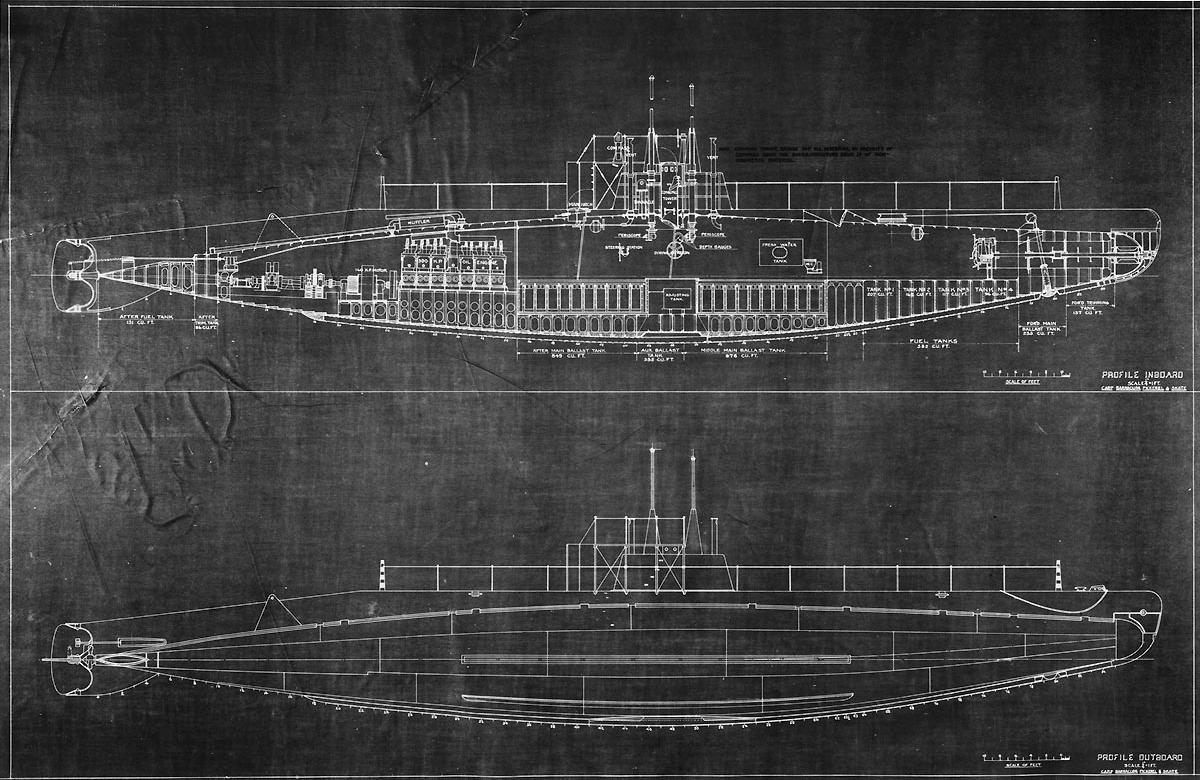
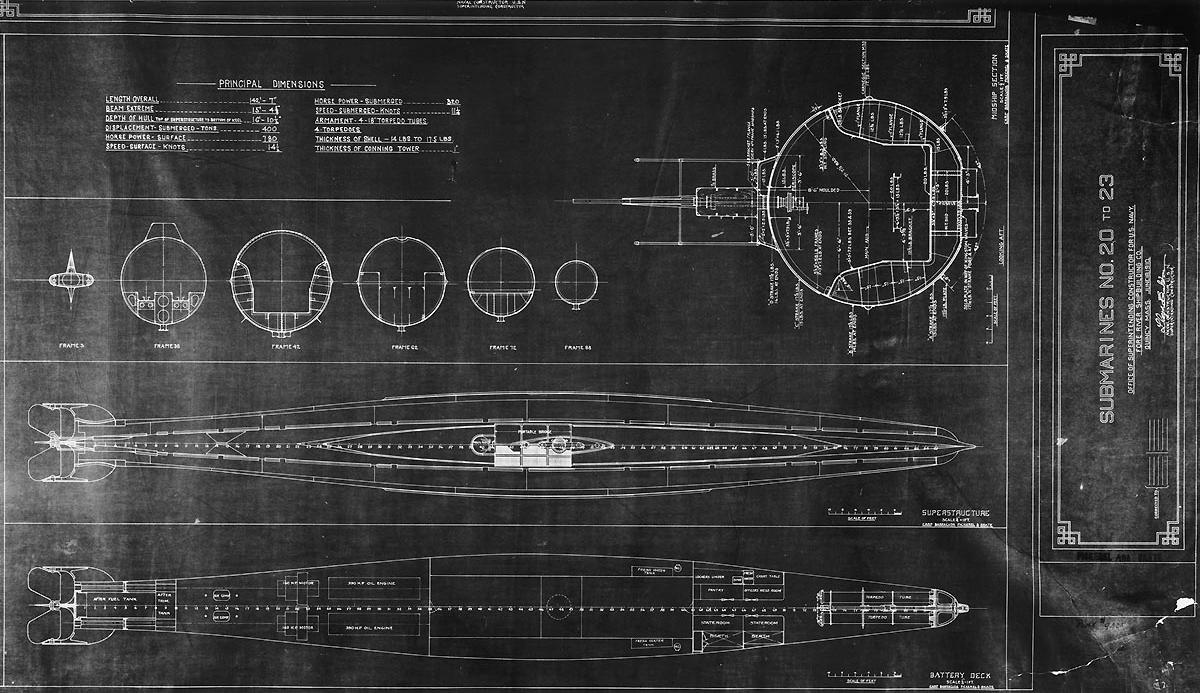
Plans for the F-class submarines of the US Navy

For surface running, the boats were powered by two 390-brake-horsepower (291 kW) NELSECO diesel engines, each driving one propeller shaft. When submerged each propeller was driven by a 310-horsepower (231 kW) electric motor. They could reach 14 kn (26 km/h; 16 mph) on the surface and 11.25 kn (20.84 km/h; 12.95 mph) underwater. On the surface, the boats had a range of 2,500 nmi (4,600 km; 2,900 mi) at 11 kn (20 km/h; 13 mph) and 100 nmi (190 km; 120 mi) at 5 kn (9.3 km/h; 5.8 mph) submerged.

The F-class submarines were armed with four 18-inch (450 mm) torpedo tubes in the bow, no reloads were carried.

== Construction ==
Skate's keel was laid down on 21 August 1909, by The Moran Company, of Seattle, Washington. She was renamed F-4 on 17 November 1911, and launched on 6 January 1912, sponsored by Mrs. Manson Franklin Backus, wife of the successful Seattle business man and banker Manson Franklin Backus. F-4 was commissioned on 3 May 1913.

== Service history ==
Joining the First Submarine Group, Pacific Torpedo Flotilla, F-4 participated in the development operations of that group along the West Coast in 1913 and into 1914. In August 1914, all four F-class submarines were transferred to duty in the Territory of Hawaii, the first submarines to operate from Hawaii, the boats towed to their new operating area by armored cruisers. The facilities at Pearl Harbor were still under construction at the time, so the submarines were based at rented pier space in Honolulu.

During training maneuvers off the entrance to Honolulu Harbor on 25 March 1915, F-4 suffered a casualty and sank to the bottom 1.5 mi (2.4 km) from the harbor, coming to rest at a depth of 51 fathoms (306 ft; 93 m). Upon noticing that F-4 had failed to return on time, Navy authorities at Honolulu began efforts to locate her. One diver from her sister ship USS F-1, Chief Gunner's Mate Jack Agraz, made numerous deep dives during the search phase without a diving suit or weights, with just a diving helmet and breast plate perched on his shoulders. Eventually searchers located F-4 on the bottom and determined that the pressure hull had imploded, flooding the submarine and killing her crew. All 21 aboard perished.

Electrician's Mate 3rd Class James Morton Hoggett, remained ashore when F-4 got underway to stand duty as a pier watchman, responsible for receiving any important news that occurred ashore while F-4 was at sea and relaying it to F-4's commanding officer upon the submarine's return, a common practice before ships had radios, as well as for looking after the submarine's supplies and gear left behind on the pier. He was F-4's only survivor.

== Salvage and recovery ==
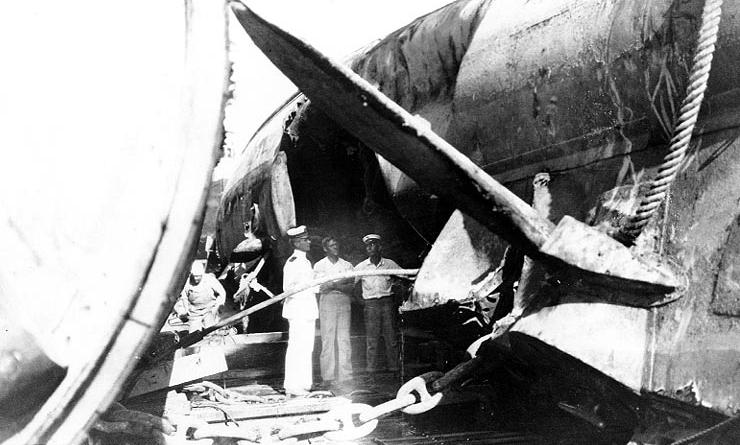
US Navy inspectors examining the implosion hole in F-4's port side in drydock at Honolulu, late August or early September 1915. Note that the submarine is upside down in the drydock, in the position she was found on the ocean bottom.

The Navy determined that the submarine needed to be raised so that the crew could be recovered and the boat examined to determine a cause of her loss. An ambitious and technologically challenging diving and engineering effort began which set a new precedent in deep-water salvage. Divers assisted in slinging lifting chains under the wreck's hull, with the chains attached to six specially built lifting pontoons. Naval Constructor Lieutenant Commander Julius A. Furer, Rear Admiral C. B. T. Moore, and Lieutenant Charles Smith, led the demanding effort. Navy diving expert Chief Gunner George D. Stillson, surveyed the wreck and found the superstructure caved in and the hull filled with water. (Note: The cited newspaper article was technically incorrect, it was actually the pressure hull that had caved in.) One of the divers involved in the salvage operation was John Henry Turpin, who was probably the first African American to qualify as a US Navy Master Diver. After five and a half months of effort the submarine was raised and returned to dry dock in Honolulu on 29 August 1915. Only four of the dead could be identified; the 17 others were buried at Arlington National Cemetery in Arlington, Virginia.

The investigating board subsequently conjectured that gradual leakage of battery acid onto the steel pressure hull below the forward battery well had weakened the hull and the rivets that held the hull together. This permitted sea water to enter the battery compartment under submerged pressure. Subsequent post-salvage examination showed that the bilge suction valves in the battery tank had been accidentally fouled by tar pitch used to seal the battery well, rendering the crew unable to pump out the flooding seawater. This flooding in the forward battery well caused the crew to lose buoyancy control, and the submarine quickly sank below her crush depth, with the hull imploding in the torpedo room. Others believe that the bypassing of an unreliable magnetic reducer closed a Kingston valve in the forward ballast tank, resulting in a delay. Based on other reported issues, there may also have been problems with the air lines supplying the ballast tank.

== Fate ==
After the completion of the investigation useful equipment was stripped from the wreck and F-4 was stricken from the Naval Vessel Register on 31 August 1915. She was removed from the dry dock in Honolulu Harbor, in early September 1915, so the other three F-class submarines, which had been rammed accidentally and lightly damaged by the Navy supply ship Supply, could be drydocked for repairs. F-4 was moved, still hanging from the pontoons, to Pearl Harbor, where she bottomed in the shallow waters of the then-unused Magazine Loch on or about 25 November 1915. She was then disconnected from the pontoons and allowed to settle into the mud at the bottom of the loch. She remained there until 1940, when she was found to be in the way of expansion of the Naval Submarine Base Pearl Harbor pier facilities. The wreck of F-4 was moved a few yards to the west and re-buried in a trench dug in the loch bottom near Submarine Base mooring S14, where it remains to this day.

Wreck location: 21.3581°N 157.9418°W

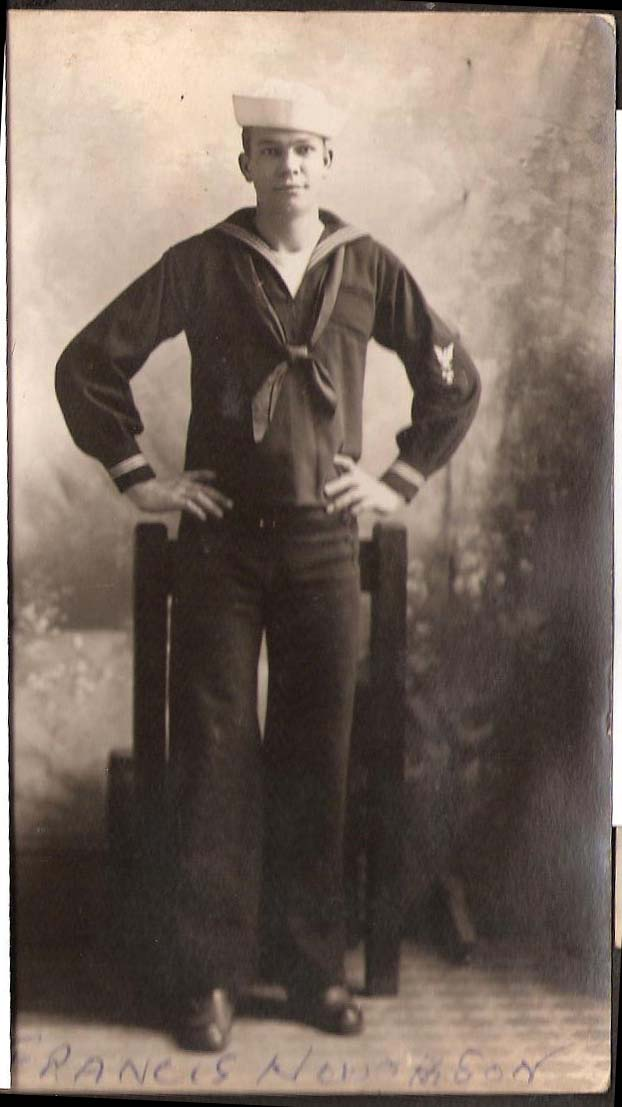
Francis Hughson, Crew Member

== Bibliography ==
- Gary, Priolo. "Skate / F-4 (SS-23)". Navsource.net.
- Cressman, Robert J. (18 May 2020). "F-4 (Submarine No. 23)". Dictionary of American Naval Fighting Ships. Navy Department, Naval History and Heritage Command. This article incorporates text from this source, which is in the public domain.
- Friedman, Norman (1995). U.S. Submarines Through 1945: An Illustrated Design History. Annapolis, Maryland: Naval Institute Press. ISBN 1-55750-263-3.
- Gardiner, Robert & Gray, Randal (1985). Conway's All the World's Fighting Ships 1906–1921. Annapolis, Maryland: Naval Institute Press. ISBN 0-85177-245-5.
- "Washington Mutual Congratulated on 44th Anniversary". The Catholic Northwest Progress. 29 September 1933. At page 3, column 5. Archived from the original on 17 May 2024.
- Hedman, Ric; Johnston, David (8 May 2025). "F-class". PigBoats.COM.
- Hedman, Ric; Johnston, David (22 September 2025a). "F-4 salvage". PigBoats.COM.
- Hedman, Ric; Johnston, David (13 March 2025b). "James Morton Hoggett". PigBoats.COM.
- Hedman, Ric; Johnston, David (18 June 2025c). "Notable Submarine Accidents". PigBoats.COM.
- Gates, John Humboldt (2022). Before the Dolphins Guild. Moonstone Publishing. ISBN 978-1-878136-03-9.
- staff (16 April 1915). "Water in Hull of F-4.; Diver Also Reports That Superstructure of Submarine Has Caved In" (PDF). NY Times.
- Cox, Samuel J. (29 April 2021). "H-060-2: Lost With All Hands". Dictionary of American Naval Fighting Ships. Navy Department, Naval History and Heritage Command.
- Honolulu Star-Bulletin (2000). "The United States Submarine F-4 March 25, 1915". Arlington National Cemetery. Archived from the original on 2 January 2009.
- Searle, Willard Franklyn Jr.; Curtis, Thomas G. Jr. (2006). "The loss and salvage of F-4, a historic milestone". Undersea Warfare. 7 (6). Navy. Archived from the original on 9 May 2016.
