= United States F-class submarine =

United States Navy submarine class

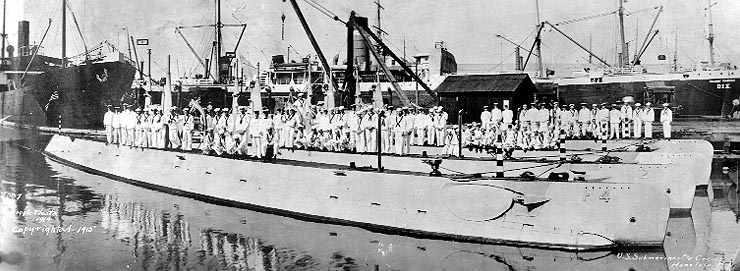
- These boats are (from front to back): USS F-4, ex-Skate, F-2, ex-Barracuda, F-3, ex-Pickerel, and F-1, ex-Carp, in Honolulu, Territory of Hawaii, in 1914. Note the "fish" flags and 13-star "boat" ensigns flown by these submarines.

Class overview
- Name: F class
- Builders: Electric Boat (design); Union Iron Works, San Francisco, California (F-1 & F-2); The Moran Company, Seattle, Washington (F-3 & F-4)
- Operators: United States Navy
- Preceded by: E class
- Succeeded by: G class
- Built: 1911–1912
- In commission: 1912–1922
- Completed: 4
- Lost: 2
- Retired: 2

General characteristics
- Type: Submarine
- Displacement: 330 long tons (335 t) surfaced; 400 long tons (406 t) submerged
- Length: 142 ft 6 in (43.43 m)
- Beam: 15 ft 5 in (4.70 m)
- Draft: 12 ft 2 in (3.71 m)
- Installed power: 780 hp (582 kW) diesel; 620 hp (462 kW) electric
- Propulsion: 2 × NELSECO diesel engines; 2 × Electro Dynamic electric motors; 2 × 60-cell batteries; 2 × Propellers
- Speed: 13.5 kn (25.0 km/h; 15.5 mph) surfaced; 11.5 kn (21.3 km/h; 13.2 mph) submerged
- Range: 2,300 nmi (4,300 km; 2,600 mi) at 11 kn (20 km/h; 13 mph) surfaced; 100 nmi (190 km; 120 mi) at 5 knots (9.3 km/h; 5.8 mph) submerged
- Test depth: 200 ft (61 m)
- Capacity: 11,500 US gal (44,000 L; 9,600 imp gal) fuel
- Complement: 1 officers; 21 enlisted
- Armament: 4 × 18 inch (450 mm) bow torpedo tubes (4 torpedoes)

The F-class submarines were a group of four submarines designed for the United States Navy by Electric Boat in 1909. F-1 and F-2 were built by Union Iron Works, in San Francisco, while F-3 and F-4 were built by The Moran Company in Seattle.

== Design ==
They were generally similar to the C-class and D-class submarines built by Electric Boat, but larger at 400 long tons (406 t) submerged vs. 337 long tons (342 t) for the D class. They were single-hulled boats with circular sections laid along the longitudinal axis. Overall length was 142 ft 6 in (43.43 m) and the beam was 15 ft 5 in (4.70 m). The E-class and the F-class submarines were the first US submarines to have bow planes. Like the E class, their early-model diesels had problems and were replaced in 1915.

The hull contained three compartments separated by partial strength watertight bulkheads:

- torpedo room with four 18 inch (450 mm) torpedo tubes,
- control room/battery rooms with the ballast control valves, hydroplane controls and periscope. Two battery wells with 60 cells each were located under the deck in the forward and aft ends of the compartment.
- engine room with two diesel engines

The two diesel engines were clutched to shafts that turned electric motors that could also be used as generators for charging the batteries. The shafts also turned the screws. For submerged operation, the diesels were de-clutched and shut down, with the battery providing all of the submarine's power. The batteries were an array of two sets of 60 cells in rubber-lined, open-topped, steel jars.

The small conning tower fairwater (also known as a sail) initially precluded any sort of bridge structure for surface cruising. For extended surface runs, a temporary piping-and-canvas structure was erected to give the topside watchstanders some protection from the elements. The considerable time required to dismantle that structure made crash diving the boat impossible, and that impediment remained until the introduction of permanent metal "chariot-style" bridge structures in 1917–1919. However, as the F-class served in the Pacific, they did not receive this upgrade.

The streamlined, rotating torpedo tube muzzle cap eliminated the drag that muzzle holes would otherwise cause. In the stowed position, the submarine appears to have no torpedo tubes, as the holes in the cap are covered by the bow stem. With the exception of the L-class and the one-off M-1, this feature remained standard for submarines designed by the Electric Boat Company, through the O-class, after which it was replaced with individual muzzle doors faired with shutters that remain standard through the modern day.

== History ==
All four F-class submarines spent their careers in the Pacific Fleet, primarily based in San Pedro Submarine Base , San Pedro, California, with a stint in Hawaii. F-4 was lost off Hawaii, on 25 March 1915, due to a battery acid leak corroding the hull. F-1 and F-3 collided off San Diego, on 17 December 1917, and F-1 was lost. F-2 and F-3 survived to be decommissioned and scrapped, in 1922, to comply with the limits of the Washington Naval Treaty.

== Boats in class ==
The following ships of the class were constructed.

Construction data
Ship name	Hull class and no.	Builder	Laid down	Launched	Comm.	Decomm.	Renamed	Rename date	Reclass. hull no.	Reclass. hull no. date	Fate
Carp	Submarine No. 20	Union Iron Works, San Francisco, California	23 August 1909	6 September 1911	19 June 1912		F-1	17 November 1911	SS-20	17 July 1920	Sunk after collision, 17 December 1917
Barracuda	Submarine No. 21	Union Iron Works, San Francisco, California	23 August 1909	19 March 1912	25 June 1912	16 March 1922	F-2	17 November 1911	SS-21	17 July 1920	Sold, 17 August 1922
Pickerel	Submarine No. 22	The Moran Company, Seattle, Washington	17 August 1909	6 January 1912	5 August 1912	15 March 1922	F-3	17 November 1911	SS-22	17 July 1920	Sold, 17 August 1922
Skate	Submarine No. 23	The Moran Company, Seattle, Washington	21 August 1909	6 January 1912	3 May 1913	31 August 1915	F-4	17 November 1911	SS-23	17 July 1920	Sunk by mechanical failure, 25 March 1915

== Bibliography ==
- Hedman, Ric; Johnston, David (8 May 2025). "PigBoats.COM Glover F-3 photos page".
- Hedman, Ric; Johnston, David (8 May 2025a). "F-class page".
- Friedman, Norman (1995). US Submarines through 1945: An Illustrated Design History. Annapolis: Naval Institute Press. ISBN 1-55750-263-3.
- Gardiner, Robert (1985). Conway's All the World's Fighting Ships 1906–1921. Conway Maritime Press. ISBN 0-85177-245-5.
- Priolo, Gary. "Carp / F-1 (SS-20)". NavSource.
- Mohl, Michael. "Barracuda / F-2 (SS-21)". NavSource.
- Mohl, Michael. "Pickerel / F-3 (SS-22)". NavSource.
- Priolo, Gary. "Skate / F-4 (SS-23)". NavSource.
