= USS F-2 (SS-21) =

F-class submarine of the United States

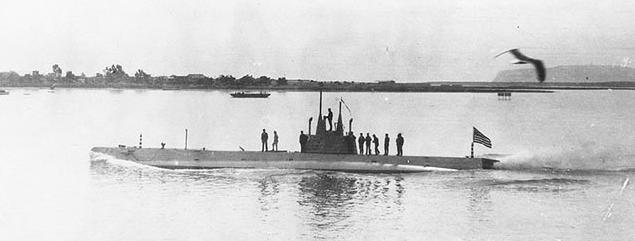
- USS F-2, ex-Barracuda, underway in San Diego Harbor, California, c. 1912–1914

History

United States
- Name: Barracuda
- Namesake: The barracuda
- Builder: Electric Boat (design); Union Iron Works, San Francisco, California
- Cost: $470,519.44 (hull and machinery)
- Laid down: 23 August 1909
- Launched: 19 March 1912
- Sponsored by: Miss Annette Reid Rolph
- Commissioned: 25 June 1912
- Decommissioned: 16 March 1916
- Recommissioned: 13 June 1917
- Decommissioned: 17 March 1922
- Renamed: F-2 (Submarine No.21), 17 November 1911
- Identification: Hull symbol: SS-21 (17 July 1920); Call sign: NCJ
- Fate: Sold, 17 August 1922

General characteristics
- Class & type: F-class submarine
- Displacement: 330 long tons (335 t) surfaced; 400 long tons (406 t) submerged
- Length: 142 ft 6 in (43.43 m)
- Beam: 15 ft 5 in (4.70 m)
- Draft: 12 ft 2 in (3.71 m)
- Installed power: 780 hp (582 kW) diesel; 620 hp (462 kW) electric
- Propulsion: 2 × NELSECO diesel engines; 2 × Electro Dynamic electric motors; 2 × 60-cell batteries; 2 × Propellers
- Speed: 13.5 kn (25.0 km/h; 15.5 mph) surfaced; 11.5 kn (21.3 km/h; 13.2 mph) submerged
- Range: 2,300 nmi (4,300 km; 2,600 mi) at 11 kn (20 km/h; 13 mph) surfaced; 100 nmi (190 km; 120 mi) at 5 knots (9.3 km/h; 5.8 mph) submerged
- Test depth: 200 ft (61 m)
- Capacity: 11,500 US gal (44,000 L; 9,600 imp gal) fuel
- Complement: 1 officers; 21 enlisted
- Armament: 4 × 18 inch (450 mm) bow torpedo tubes (4 torpedoes)

USS Barracuda/F-2 (SS-21), also known as "Submarine No. 21", was an F-class submarine in the United States Navy (USN). She was the first ship of the USN named for the barracuda, though she was renamed F-2 prior to launching.

== Design ==
The F-class boats had an overall length of 142 ft 7 in (43.5 m), a beam of 15 ft 5 in (4.7 m), and a mean draft of 12 ft 2 in (3.7 m). They displaced 330 long tons (340 t) on the surface and 400 long tons (410 t) submerged with a diving depth of 200 ft (61.0 m). The F-class submarines had a crew of 1 officer and 21 enlisted men.

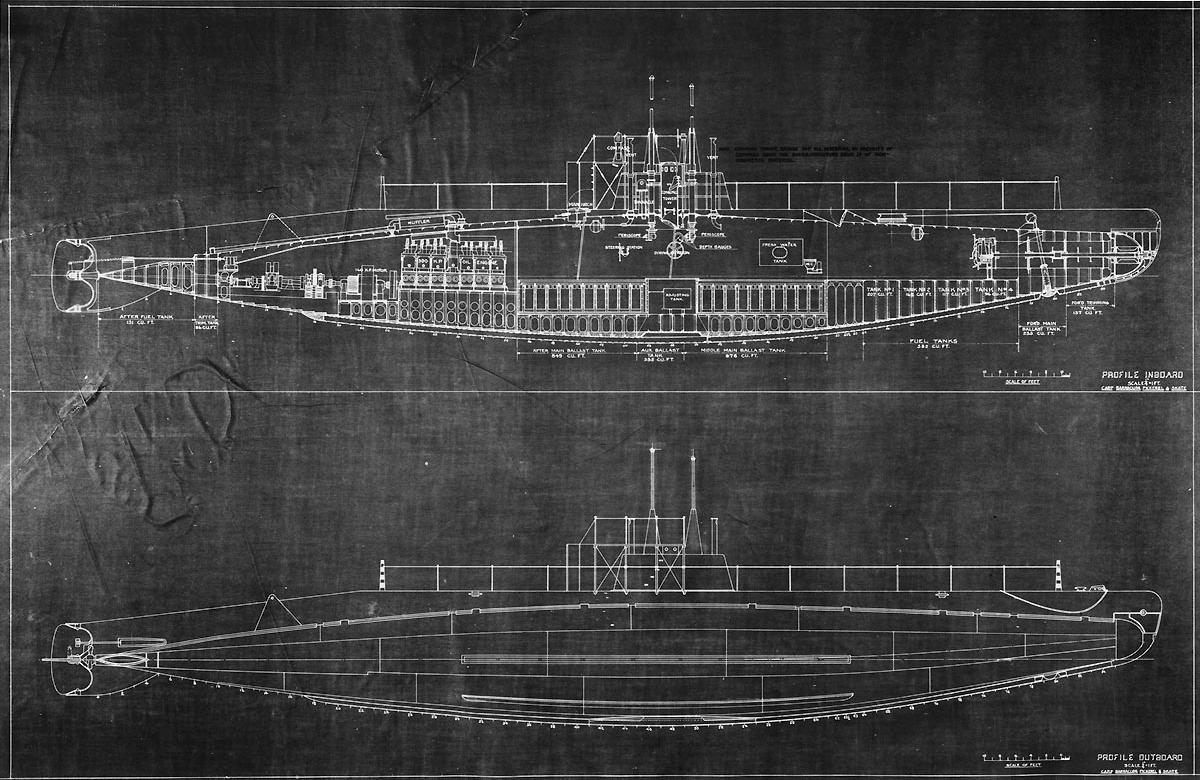
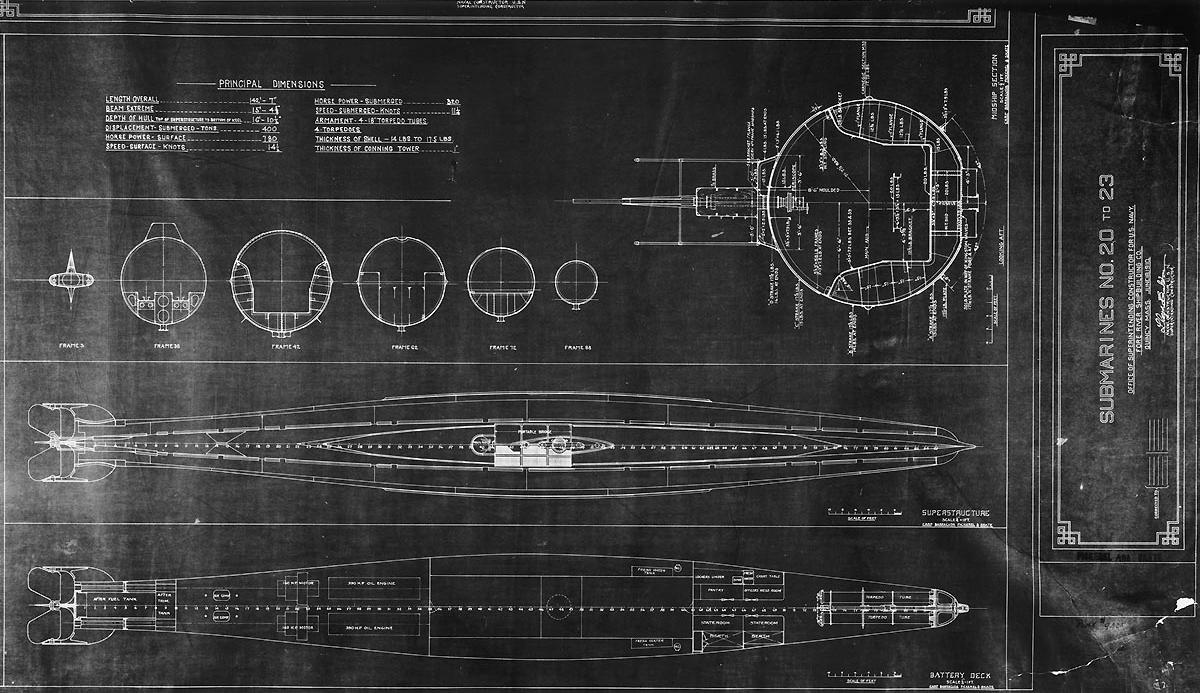
Plans for the F-class submarines of the US Navy

For surface running, the boats were powered by two 390-brake-horsepower (291 kW) NELSECO diesel engines, each driving one propeller shaft. When submerged each propeller was driven by a 310-horsepower (231 kW) electric motor. They could reach 14 kn (26 km/h; 16 mph) on the surface and 11.25 kn (20.84 km/h; 12.95 mph) underwater. On the surface, the boats had a range of 2,500 nmi (4,600 km; 2,900 mi) at 11 kn (20 km/h; 13 mph) and 100 nmi (190 km; 120 mi) at 5 kn (9.3 km/h; 5.8 mph) submerged.

The F-class submarines were armed with four 18-inch (450 mm) torpedo tubes in the bow, no reloads were carried.

== Construction ==
Barracuda's keel was laid down by Union Iron Works, of San Francisco, California, on 23 August 1909. She was launched on 19 March 1912, sponsored by Miss Annette Reid Rolph, daughter of James Rolph, the mayor of San Francisco. She was renamed F-2 on 17 November 1911, and commissioned on 25 June 1912.

== Service history ==
F-2 joined the 1st Submarine Group, Pacific Torpedo Flotilla, in operations between San Diego, California, and San Pedro, out of San Pedro Submarine Base, the Flotilla's base. She continued to play an important part in developing tactics and coordinating the use of undersea craft with the fleet during an extended training period in the Hawaiian Islands, the boats towed to their destination by armored cruisers, from August 1914 through November 1915.

After lying in ordinary at Mare Island Naval Shipyard, between 15 March 1916 and 13 June 1917, F-2 became flagboat of Division 1, Submarine Force, Pacific Fleet. Returning to operations out of San Pedro, she participated in surface and submerged exercises, torpedo-proving practice, experiments in balancing at various depths, and trained prospective crews of new submarines.

== Fate ==
On 18 September 1919, she was placed in reserve commission at San Pedro, to be used in elemental school work until decommissioned at Mare Island, on 16 March 1922. She was sold on 17 August.

== Bibliography ==
- "Table 21 - Ships on Navy List June 30, 1919". Congressional Serial Set. U.S. Government Printing Office: 764. 1921.
- Michael, Mohl. "Barracuda / F-2 (SS-21)". Navsource.net.
- Cressman, Robert J. (18 May 2020). "F-2 (Submarine No. 21)". Dictionary of American Naval Fighting Ships. Navy Department, Naval History and Heritage Command. This article incorporates text from this source, which is in the public domain.
- Friedman, Norman (1995). U.S. Submarines Through 1945: An Illustrated Design History. Annapolis, Maryland: Naval Institute Press. ISBN 1-55750-263-3.
- Gardiner, Robert & Gray, Randal (1985). Conway's All the World's Fighting Ships 1906–1921. Annapolis, Maryland: Naval Institute Press. ISBN 0-85177-245-5.
