= USS F-3 =

F-class submarine of the United States

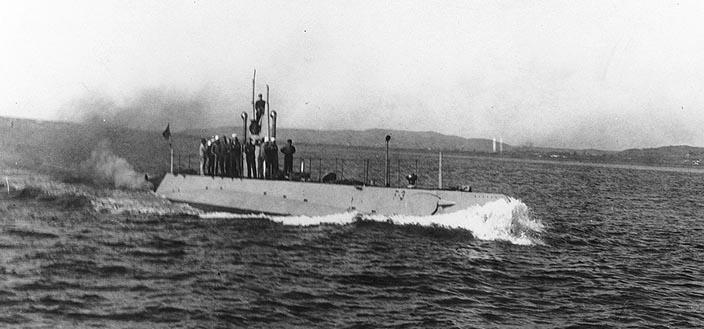
- USS F-3, ex-Pickerel, underway off San Diego, California, c. 1912

History

United States
- Name: Pickerel
- Namesake: A young pike fish
- Builder: The Moran Company, Seattle, Washington
- Cost: $469,588.17 (hull and machinery)
- Laid down: 17 August 1909
- Launched: 6 January 1912
- Sponsored by: Mrs. M. F. Backus
- Commissioned: 5 August 1912
- Decommissioned: 15 March 1916
- Recommissioned: 13 June 1917
- Decommissioned: 15 March 1922
- Renamed: F-3 (Submarine No.22), 17 November 1911
- Identification: Hull symbol: SS-22 (17 July 1920); Call sign: NQB
- Fate: Sold, 17 August 1922

General characteristics
- Class & type: F-class submarine
- Displacement: 330 long tons (335 t) surfaced; 400 long tons (406 t) submerged
- Length: 142 ft 6 in (43.43 m)
- Beam: 15 ft 5 in (4.70 m)
- Draft: 12 ft 2 in (3.71 m)
- Installed power: 780 hp (582 kW) diesel; 620 hp (462 kW) electric
- Propulsion: 2 × NELSECO diesel engines; 2 × Electro Dynamic electric motors; 2 × 60-cell batteries; 2 × Propellers
- Speed: 13.5 kn (25.0 km/h; 15.5 mph) surfaced; 11.5 kn (21.3 km/h; 13.2 mph) submerged
- Range: 2,300 nmi (4,300 km; 2,600 mi) at 11 kn (20 km/h; 13 mph) surfaced; 100 nmi (190 km; 120 mi) at 5 knots (9.3 km/h; 5.8 mph) submerged
- Test depth: 200 ft (61 m)
- Capacity: 11,500 US gal (44,000 L; 9,600 imp gal) fuel
- Complement: 1 officers; 21 enlisted
- Armament: 4 × 18 inch (450 mm) bow torpedo tubes (4 torpedoes)

USS Pickerel/F-3 (SS-22), also known as "Submarine No. 22", was an F-class submarine in the United States Navy (USN). She was the first ship of the USN to be named for the pickerel, a young pike, though she was renamed F-3 prior to launching.

== Design ==
The F-class boats had an overall length of 142 ft 7 in (43.5 m), a beam of 15 ft 5 in (4.7 m), and a mean draft of 12 ft 2 in (3.7 m). They displaced 330 long tons (340 t) on the surface and 400 long tons (410 t) submerged with a diving depth of 200 ft (61.0 m). The F-class submarines had a crew of 1 officer and 21 enlisted men.

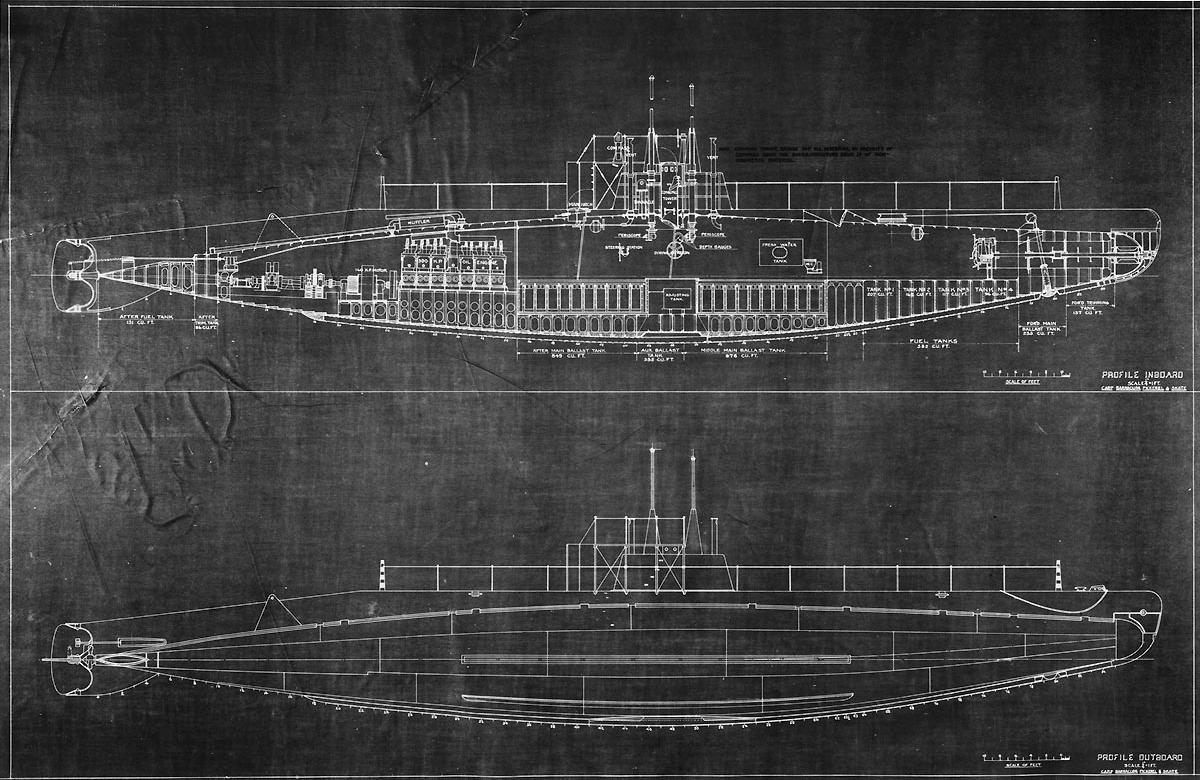
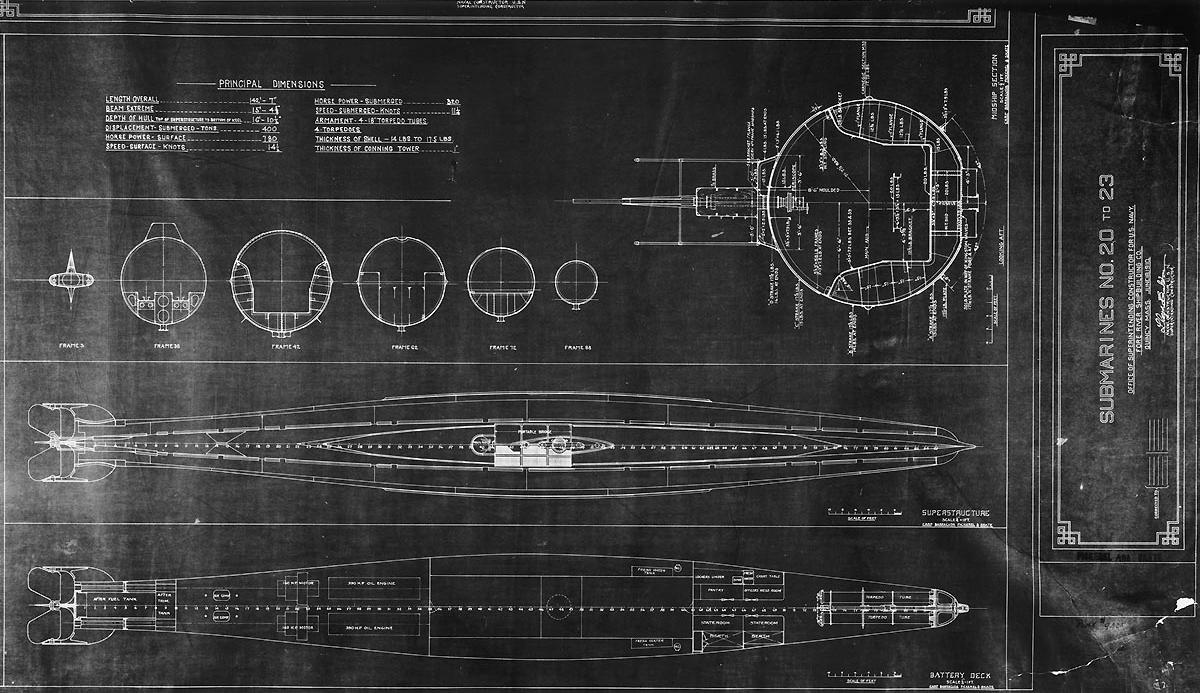
Plans for the F-class submarines of the US Navy

For surface running, the boats were powered by two 390-brake-horsepower (291 kW) NELSECO diesel engines, each driving one propeller shaft. When submerged each propeller was driven by a 310-horsepower (231 kW) electric motor. They could reach 14 kn (26 km/h; 16 mph) on the surface and 11.25 kn (20.84 km/h; 12.95 mph) underwater. On the surface, the boats had a range of 2,500 nmi (4,600 km; 2,900 mi) at 11 kn (20 km/h; 13 mph) and 100 nmi (190 km; 120 mi) at 5 kn (9.3 km/h; 5.8 mph) submerged.

The F-class submarines were armed with four 18-inch (450 mm) torpedo tubes in the bow, no reloads were carried.

== Construction ==
Pickerel's keel was laid down by The Moran Company, of Seattle, Washington, on 17 August 1909. She was renamed F-3 on 17 November 1911, and launched on 6 January 1912, sponsored by Mrs. M. F. Backus. F-3 was commissioned on 5 August 1912.

== Service history ==
F-3 completed her trials in the Puget Sound area before reporting for duty at San Francisco, California, on 15 October 1912, when she joined the First Submarine Group, Pacific Torpedo Flotilla. The Flotilla operated along the coast of California, conducting constant exercises and experiments to develop the techniques of submarine warfare, and from August 1914 to November 1915, carried out similar operations in the Hawaiian Islands, the boats towed to their new operating area by armored cruisers. F-3 was placed in ordinary at Mare Island Navy Yard, in Vallejo, California, on 15 March 1916, returning to full commission on 13 June 1917.

After training her new crew, F-3 was assigned to the Coast Torpedo Force, Pacific Fleet, based at San Pedro, California's San Pedro Submarine Base. She engaged in daily operations, surfaced and submerged, training students of the submarine school. During maneuvers on 17 December 1917, she and F-1 collided, the latter sinking almost immediately. F-3, along with other submarines with whom she was operating, rescued only three men out of the 22 on board F-1. F-3 suffered a cracked bow cap and after repairs at Mare Island Navy Yard, was assigned operations in cooperation with a civilian motion picture company in experiments with underwater photography.

== Fate ==
From 1919 to 1921, F-3 served at San Pedro, as a training ship, and on 15 March 1922, she was decommissioned. She was sold on 17 August 1922.

== Bibliography ==
- "Table 21 - Ships on Navy List June 30, 1919". Congressional Serial Set. U.S. Government Printing Office: 764. 1921.
- Michael, Mohl. "Pickerel / F-3 (SS-22)". Navsource.net.
- Cressman, Robert J. (18 May 2020). "F-3 (Submarine No. 22)". Dictionary of American Naval Fighting Ships. Navy Department, Naval History and Heritage Command. This article incorporates text from this source, which is in the public domain.
- Friedman, Norman (1995). U.S. Submarines Through 1945: An Illustrated Design History. Annapolis, Maryland: Naval Institute Press. ISBN 1-55750-263-3.
- Gardiner, Robert & Gray, Randal (1985). Conway's All the World's Fighting Ships 1906–1921. Annapolis, Maryland: Naval Institute Press. ISBN 0-85177-245-5.
