= USS F-1 =

F-class submarine of the United States

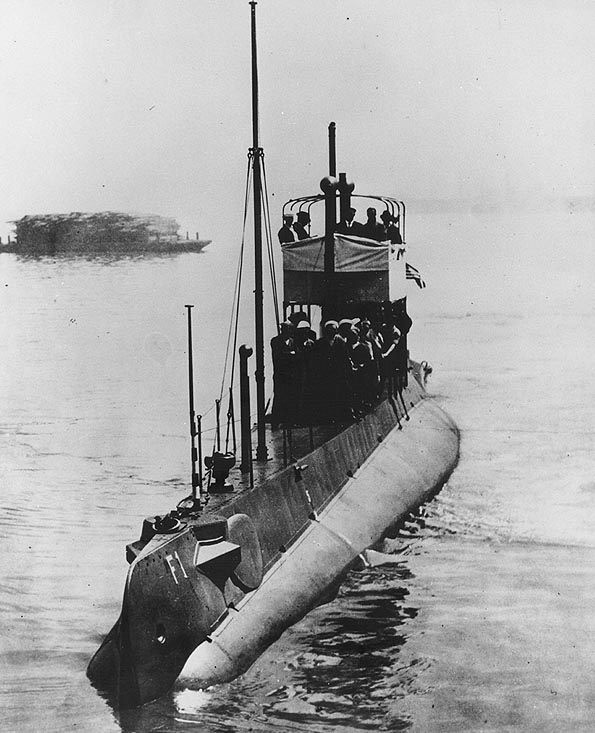
- Bow view of USS F-1, ex-Carp, in a harbor on the United States West Coast.

History

United States
- Name: Carp
- Namesake: The carp
- Builder: Electric Boat (design); Union Iron Works, San Francisco, California
- Laid down: 23 August 1909
- Launched: 6 September 1911
- Sponsored by: Miss Josephine Tynan
- Commissioned: 19 June 1912
- Decommissioned: 15 March 1916
- Recommissioned: 13 June 1917
- Renamed: F-1 (Submarine No.20), 17 November 1911
- Identification: Hull symbol: SS-20 (17 July 1920), number later given to G-1
- Fate: Sunk by collision, 17 December 1917

General characteristics
- Class & type: F-class submarine
- Displacement: 330 long tons (335 t) surfaced; 400 long tons (406 t) submerged
- Length: 142 ft 6 in (43.43 m)
- Beam: 15 ft 5 in (4.70 m)
- Draft: 12 ft 2 in (3.71 m)
- Installed power: 780 hp (582 kW) diesel; 620 hp (462 kW) electric
- Propulsion: 2 × NELSECO diesel engines; 2 × Electro Dynamic electric motors; 2 × 60-cell batteries; 2 × Propellers
- Speed: 13.5 kn (25.0 km/h; 15.5 mph) surfaced; 11.5 kn (21.3 km/h; 13.2 mph) submerged
- Range: 2,300 nmi (4,300 km; 2,600 mi) at 11 kn (20 km/h; 13 mph) surfaced; 100 nmi (190 km; 120 mi) at 5 knots (9.3 km/h; 5.8 mph) submerged
- Test depth: 200 ft (61 m)
- Capacity: 11,500 US gal (44,000 L; 9,600 imp gal) fuel
- Complement: 1 officers; 21 enlisted
- Armament: 4 × 18 inch (450 mm) bow torpedo tubes (4 torpedoes)

USS Carp/F-1 (SS-20), also known as "Submarine No. 20", was an F-class submarine. She was the first ship of the United States Navy named for the carp, though she was renamed F-1 prior to commissioning. Commissioned in 1912, she operated in the Pacific Ocean until she sank after a collision in 1917, the only US submarine lost during the US participation in World War I.

== Design ==
The F-class boats had an overall length of 142 ft 7 in (43.5 m), a beam of 15 ft 5 in (4.7 m), and a mean draft of 12 ft 2 in (3.7 m). They displaced 330 long tons (340 t) on the surface and 400 long tons (410 t) submerged with a diving depth of 200 ft (61.0 m). The F-class submarines had a crew of 1 officer and 21 enlisted men.

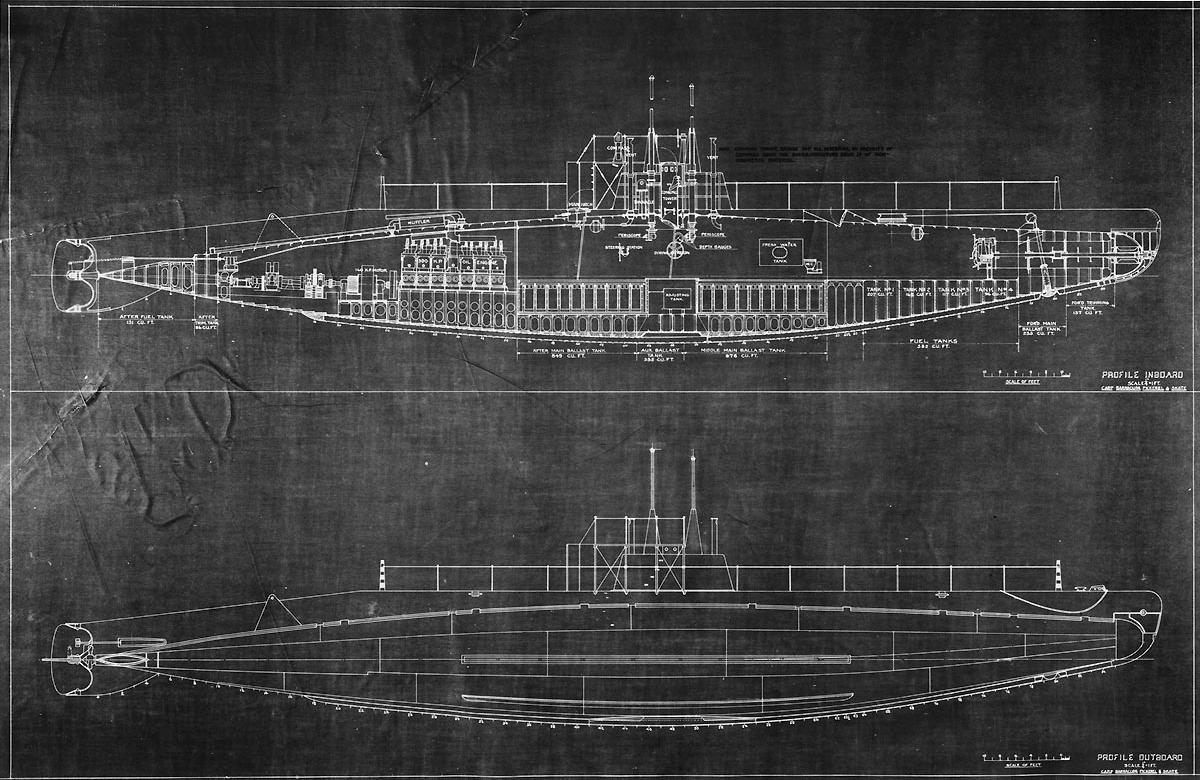
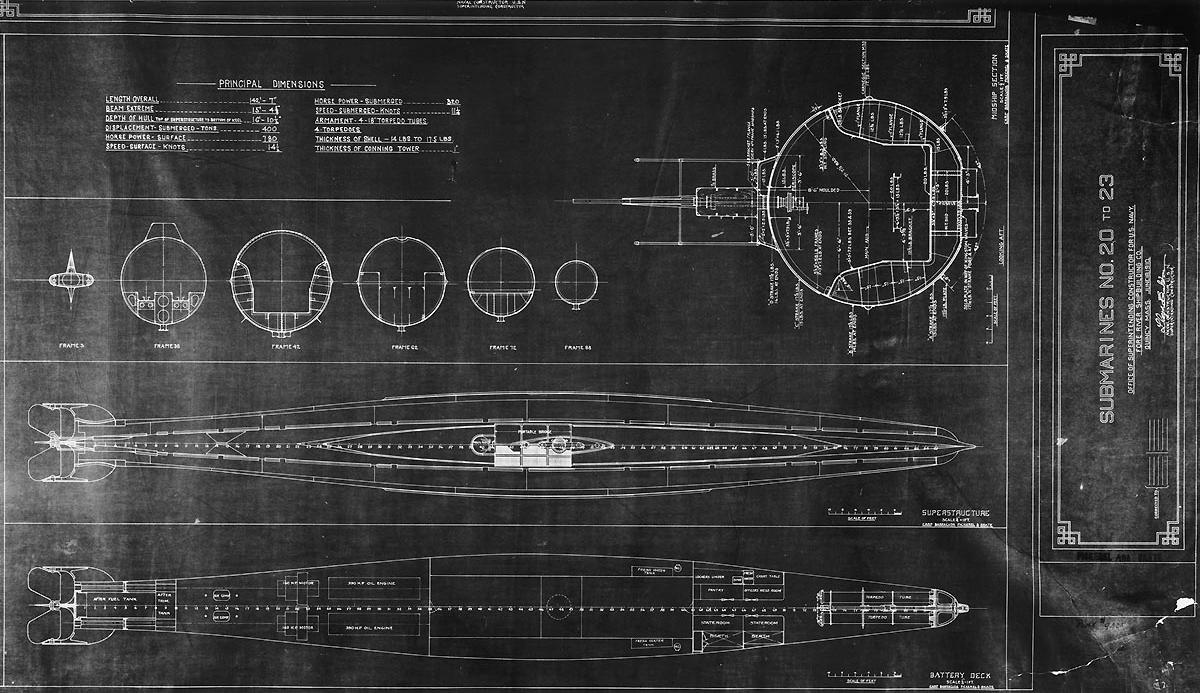
Plans for the F-class submarines of the US Navy

For surface running, the boats were powered by two 390-brake-horsepower (291 kW) NELSECO diesel engines, each driving one propeller shaft. When submerged each propeller was driven by a 310-horsepower (231 kW) electric motor. They could reach 14 kn (26 km/h; 16 mph) on the surface and 11.25 kn (20.84 km/h; 12.95 mph) underwater. On the surface, the boats had a range of 2,500 nmi (4,600 km; 2,900 mi) at 11 kn (20 km/h; 13 mph) and 100 nmi (190 km; 120 mi) at 5 kn (9.3 km/h; 5.8 mph) submerged.

The F-class submarines were armed with four 18-inch (450 mm) torpedo tubes in the bow. No reloads were carried.

== Construction ==
Carp's keel was laid down by Union Iron Works, of San Francisco, California, a subcontractor of the Electric Boat Company, on 23 August 1909. She was launched on 6 September 1911, and sponsored by Miss Josephine Tynan. She was renamed F-1 on 17 November 1911, and commissioned on 19 June 1912.

== Service history ==
Assigned to the First Submarine Group, Pacific Torpedo Flotilla, F-1 operated in the San Francisco, area on trials and tests through 11 January 1913, when she joined the flotilla for training at sea between San Diego, California, and San Pedro Submarine Base, San Pedro, then in San Diego Harbor.

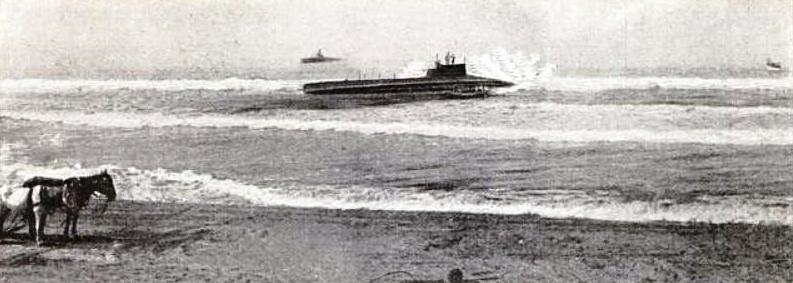
F-1 grounded in late 1912 after slipping her mooring

In late 1912, the boat, which then held the world's deep diving record, descending to 283 ft (86 m), slipped her mooring at Port Watsonville, in Monterey Bay, and grounded on a nearby beach. While most of the crew of 17 safely evacuated, two men died in the incident.

From 21 July 1914 to 14 November 1915, the Flotilla, towed to their destination by armored cruisers, was based at Honolulu, for development operations in the Hawaiian Islands.

F-1 lay in ordinary from 15 March 1916 to 13 June 1917. When she returned to full commission, she served with the Patrol Force, Pacific, making surface and submerged runs to continue her part in the development of submarine tactics. Her base during this time was San Pedro. On 17 December 1917, while maneuvering in exercises off Point Loma, F-1 and F-3 collided, the former sinking in ten seconds, her port side torn forward of the engine room. Nineteen of her men were lost; the remaining three were rescued by F-3.

F-1 sank to the seafloor over 1,300 ft (400 m) below where it was rediscovered in 2025 by researchers from the Woods Hole Oceanographic Institution, lying "remarkably intact" on its starboard side.

== Bibliography ==
- Gary, Priolo. "Carp / F-1 (SS-20)". Navsource.net.
- Martin, Christopher J. (5 June 2025). "F-1 (Submarine No. 20)". Dictionary of American Naval Fighting Ships. Navy Department, Naval History and Heritage Command. This article incorporates text from this source, which is in the public domain.
- Friedman, Norman (1995). U.S. Submarines Through 1945: An Illustrated Design History. Annapolis, Maryland: Naval Institute Press. ISBN 1-55750-263-3.
- Gardiner, Robert & Gray, Randal (1985). Conway's All the World's Fighting Ships 1906–1921. Annapolis, Maryland: Naval Institute Press. ISBN 0-85177-245-5.
- "Submarine Wrecked in Surf". Popular Mechanics Magazine. January 1913.
- Linder, Bruce (2001). San Diego's Navy. Annapolis, Maryland: Naval Institute Press. p. 63. ISBN 1-55750-531-4.
- Metcalfe, Tom (23 May 2025). "American submarine, lost for over a century, discovered 'remarkably intact' off the coast of San Diego". Live Science.
