= Kulshan (disambiguation) =

Kulshan is a name for Koma Kulshan, the volcano otherwise known as Mount Baker.

Kulshan can also refer to:

- Koma Kulshan Project, a run-of-the-river hydroelectric generation facility on the slopes of Mount Baker
- Kulshan (steamship), a steamship that operated on the Puget Sound
- Kulshan Caldera, a caldera in the Mount Baker volcanic field
- MV Kulshan, a passenger ferry operated by Washington State Ferries
- Kulshan (steamship), steamship which operated on Puget Sound from 1910 until 1929
- Kulshan Middle School, part of the Bellingham School District
- Komo Kulshan and his two wives, a Lummi creation tale
