= Arapaho-class tugboat =

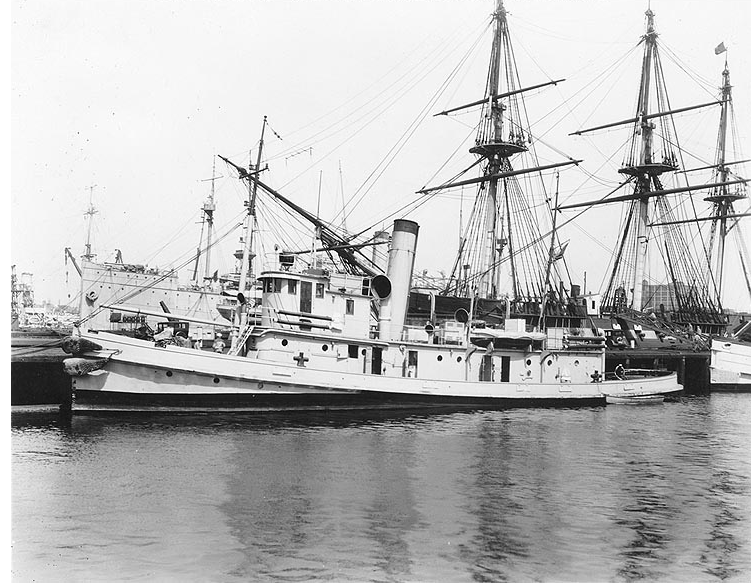
- USS Mohave, docked near USS Bridgeport and USS Constitution (r), c. 1924

Class overview
- Name: Arapaho class
- Builders: Seattle Construction and Drydock Company, Seattle, Washington
- Operators: United States Navy
- Built: 1914
- In service: 1914–1986
- Completed: 3
- Lost: 1
- Retired: 2

General characteristics
- Type: Tugboat
- Displacement: 575 tons
- Length: 122 ft 6 in (37.34 m)
- Beam: 24 ft (7.3 m)
- Draft: 12 ft 10 in (3.91 m)
- Propulsion: Steam with single screw
- Speed: 11 knots (20 km/h; 13 mph)
- Complement: 28
- Armament: 2 × 3-pounder guns (1918)

Arapaho-class tugboats were oceangoing tugboats designated fleet tugs by the United States Navy during their service in the early half of the 20th century. They were in service during World War I and World War II. Arapaho was built by the Seattle Construction and Drydock Company in Seattle, Washington.

== Ships in class ==
Arapaho class
Name	Builder	Laid down	Launched	Entered service	Fate
Arapaho	Seattle Construction and Drydock Company, Seattle, Washington	16 December 1913	20 June 1914	2 December 1914	Sold 5 May 1937, renamed Evridiki in 1960, sold and renamed Faneromini in 1968. Scrapped in 1986.
Mohave	Seattle Construction and Drydock Company, Seattle, Washington	16 December 1913	20 June 1914	2 December 1914	Wrecked on 13 February 1928 in Massachusetts Bay.
Tillamook	Seattle Construction and Drydock Company, Seattle, Washington	6 January 1914	15 August 1914	—	Scrapped in 1947

== Service history ==
The first vessel in the class Arapaho was classified as a fleet tug and initially designated Tug No. 14 by the United States Navy after it entered service on 2 December 1914. During World War I, the tug operated out of Mare Island Navy Yard in California. In 1918, the ship transited the Panama Canal and began operations with the United States Atlantic Fleet, home ported at Norfolk, Virginia. In 1920, the ship was re-designated AT-14 by the navy. The tugboat was taken out of service on 6 April 1922. While deactivated, the vessel was re-designated YT-121 in 1936. The ship was struck from the Naval Vessel Register on 22 December 1936 and sold to A. S. Hughes' Sons of Philadelphia on 24 December.

The second ship, Mohave, entered service on 2 December 1914 and designated Tug No. 15. The tugboat was assigned to Puget Sound Navy Yard until 1918 when a need for more tugboats on the East Coast caused Mohave to be re-based to Norfolk via the Panama Canal. The tugboat completed two operations to Bermuda and was temporarily loaned to the National Overseas Transportation Service. In 1919, Mohave operated in the Caribbean Sea. The ship was re-designated AT-15 in 1920. On 18 March 1921, the tugboat was re-based to Boston, Massachusetts, towing barges and lighters along the coast. On 13 February 1928, while towing an empty lighter from Provincetown, Massachusetts to Boston, the tugboat ran aground in Massachusetts Bay in heavy waves. Damaged in the engine room, the tugboat was abandoned by its crew of which three were lost. Too damaged to be returned to service, the hulk was sold for scrap on 9 April 1928.

The third and final ship of the class, Tillamook, entered service soon after its launch on 15 August 1914. The vessel, designated Tug No. 16 was assigned to Mare Island Navy Yard in San Francisco, California. The vessel spent its entire career attached to the yard. In 1920, the tug was re-designated AT-16. In 1936 older fleet tugs were re-classified as yard craft and Tillamook was once again re-designated YT-122. During World War II, the vessel was re-classified again, this time as a medium harbor tug, and re-designated YTM-122 on 13 April 1944. Following the end of the war, the vessel was taken out of service and put up for disposal on 28 April 1947.

== See also ==
- Sotoyomo-class tugboat
- Type V ship - Tugs
- List of auxiliaries of the United States Navy
