= USS Tillamook =

USS Tillamook has been the name of more than one United States Navy ship, and may refer to:

- USS Tillamook (AT-16), previously Tug No. 16, later YT-122, later YTM-122, a tug in commission from 1914 to 1947
- USS Tillamook (SP-269), later USS SP-269, a patrol vessel in commission from 1917 to 1919
- USS Tillamook (ATA-192), originally USS ATA-192, a tug in commission from 1945 to 1971
