= Panuco =

Panuco may refer to:

Places

- Pánuco (disambiguation), a name related to several places in Mexico

Ships

- USS Panuco (ID-1533), a United States Navy cargo ship in commission from 1918 to 1919
