= USS SC-48 =

United States Navy submarine chaser

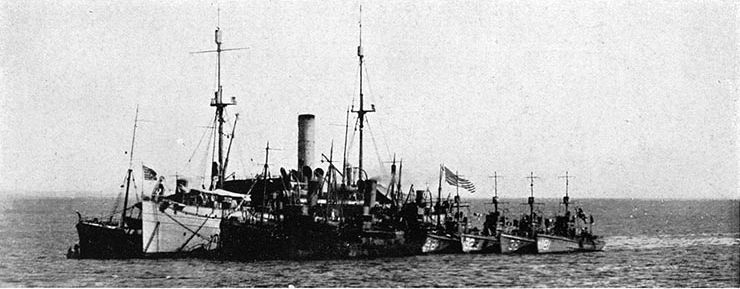
- USS SC-48 (right center, under the large American flag) anchored aport of Panther and several naval trawlers at Kirkwall Harbor, Orkney Islands, in 1919. Sister ships SC-328, SC-38, and SC-181 are aport of SC-48.

History

United States
- Name: USS SC-48
- Builder: New York Navy Yard; Brooklyn, New York
- Commissioned: 27 March 1918
- Fate: Sold on 24 June 1921; Ultimate fate unknown

General characteristics
- Class & type: SC-1-class submarine chaser
- Displacement: 85 t
- Length: 110 ft (34 m)
- Beam: 14 ft 8.75 in (4.4895 m)
- Draft: 5 ft 8 in (1.73 m)
- Propulsion: 3 × 660 hp (490 kW) Standard gasoline engines; 3 shafts
- Speed: 18 knots (33 km/h; 21 mph)
- Complement: 17
- Armament: 1 × 3"/23 caliber gun mount; 3 × .30 caliber machine guns; 1 × Y gun depth charge projector

USS SC-48, sometimes styled as either Submarine Chaser No. 48 or S.C.-48, was an SC-1-class submarine chaser built for the United States Navy during World War I. Like most members of her class, she was not named and known only by her designation.

== Construction and commissioning ==
SC-48 was built at New York Navy Yard in Brooklyn, New York in 1918. She was commissioned 27 March 1918.

== Service history ==
On 28 June 1918 SC-48 left New London, Connecticut in a convoy with 17 other submarine chasers, destroyer tender Bridgeport, and several other vessels, bound for France via Bermuda and the Azores. At 06:40 on 5 August, as the convoy neared the Ushant Light, SC-48 spotted a torpedo wake headed for Bridgeport and sounded the alarm. Bridgeport's evasive action avoided the torpedo, and, despite reports of a periscope sighting, no submarine was ever located or sunk.

SC-48 served with sister ships SC-45 and SC-47 in Unit 20 of Division 21, and was based in Plymouth and Queenstown during the war. After the Armistice, Unit 20 took part in operations to clear the North Sea Mine Barrage through the end of September 1919.

It is unclear if SC-48 remained in commission on 17 July 1920. If she were, she would have received, as part of the new U.S. Navy letter-number scheme, the hull designation of PC-48.

SC-48 was sold on 24 June 1921 to Joseph G. Hitner of Philadelphia. By 1925, the ship had been renamed Stumble Inn 1 and was owned by Clarence Fix and based in Buffalo, New York. The Fix family used this ship for bootlegging and it was seized by the Canadian government which is the last recording of its whereabouts.
