= SS Breslau =

A number of steamships were named Breslau, including

- SS Breslau (1882), a British cargo ship in service 1882–1932
- SS Breslau (1901), a German cargo ship in service 1901–14

== See also ==
- SMS Breslau, an Imperial German Navy cruiser in service 1912–1918 transferred 1914 to the Ottoman Navy and renamed Midilli
