= AT-16 =

AT-16 may refer to:

- AT-16 Scallion, the NATO reporting name for the Russian build 9K121 Vikhr laser guided anti-tank missile
- Noorduyn AT-16, a Canadian built version of the North American T-6 Texan trainer aircraft
- USS Tillamook (AT-16), a United States Navy tug in service from 1914 to 1947
