= USS Mohave =

Tugboat of the United States Navy

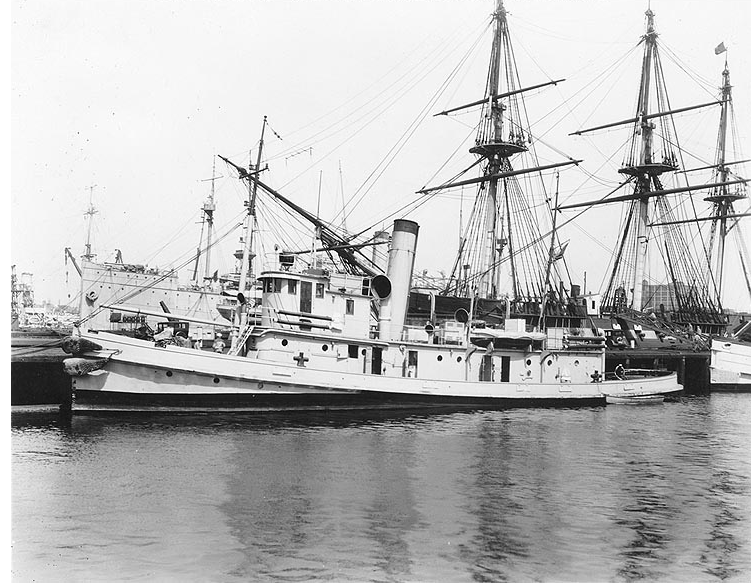
- USS Mohave (AT-15), docked near the destroyer tender USS Bridgeport (AD-10) (left background) and the frigate USS Constitution (right), ca. 1924.

History

United States
- Name: USS Mohave (AT-15)
- Namesake: Mohave people
- Builder: Seattle Construction & DD Com.
- Laid down: 16 December 1913
- Launched: 20 June 1914
- In service: 2 December 1914
- Out of service: 29 March 1928
- Stricken: 10 April 1928
- Fate: Wrecked 13 February 1928

General characteristics
- Class & type: Arapaho-class fleet tug
- Displacement: 575
- Length: 122 ft 6 in (37.34 m)
- Beam: 24 ft (7.3 m)
- Draft: 12 ft 10 in (3.91 m)
- Speed: 11 kts
- Complement: 28
- Armament: (1918) 2 x 3-pounders

USS Mohave (AT-15) was a Arapaho-class fleet tug of the United States Navy. The unnamed steel-hulled Fleet Tug No.15 was laid down on 16 December 1913 by the Seattle Construction and Drydock Company. She was named Mohave in accordance with General Order No. 97 of 9 May 1914, for the Yuman tribe on the Colorado River in Arizona, California, and Nevada. Launched on 20 June 1914; and placed in service at the Puget Sound Navy Yard, Bremerton, Washington, on 2 December 1914.

Assigned to the Puget Sound Navy Yard the same day, Mohave operated in the Bremerton‑Seattle area and off the coast of Washington on various towing assignments into 1918. Because of the desperate need created by World War I for sea‑going tugs in the Atlantic Ocean, she was detached from Puget Sound Navy Yard 6 February 1918 and sailed ten days later for the east coast. Steaming via Mare Island and San Diego, California, various Mexican ports, the Panama Canal, and Key West, Florida, the ship reached Norfolk, Virginia, on 29 April, and following operations along the east coast and two towing voyages to Bermuda, was temporarily assigned to the Naval Overseas Transportation Service (NOTS) on 6 August.

Mohave towed coal barges from Norfolk to New England ports until after the Armistice in November 1918, and was then detached from NOTS five days before Christmas (20 December) and was assigned to the 5th Naval District. In 1919, she made two voyages to Bermuda and then operated in the Caribbean between Guantanamo Bay, Cuba, and Santo Domingo, Dominican Republic, until returning to Norfolk via Key West and Charleston, S.C., on 15 December 1919. The next year, during which time she received the alphanumeric hull number AT-15 on 17 July 1920, Mohave served the fleet by towing coal and stores to Indian Head, Maryland, and making brief voyages to Charleston and New York City. On 18 March 1921, she was transferred to the 1st Naval District. Based out of Boston, the tug pulled and pushed her barges to ports all along the New England coast, making frequent trips to Portsmouth, N.H., Newport, R.I., and numerous Massachusetts ports over the next seven years.

In early January 1928, Mohave towed a large oil barge to Provincetown, Mass., to be unloaded, and then sailed on 12 February to return to Boston, with the empty lighter in tow. Steaming at 9 knots in heavy seas, Mohave ran aground in Massachusetts Bay on Harding Ledge 42°18′18″N 70°50′52″W near Nantasket, Massachusetts, on 13 February, and took a heavy list forward. Her holds and engine room flooded, and her crew abandoned ship; tragically, three enlisted men took possession of a punt, without first having obtained permission to do so, and tried to reach the shore. "No trace has since been found," the Secretary of the Navy later wrote, "of either the punt or the [three men]." By 20 February, a storm had badly damaged the ship, causing a 60° list and destruction of her upper works. Found unfit for service on 29 March, the ship was sold as a hulk on 9 April.

Mohave was stricken from the Naval Vessel Register on 10 April 1928. The wreck is still on the reef as of 2006.
