= USS SC-142 =

WWI US submarine chaser

History

France
- Name: SC-142
- Builder: Rocky River Dry Dock Co, Rocky River, Ohio
- Launched: 1917
- Fate: Unknown

General characteristics
- Class & type: SC-1-class submarine chaser
- Displacement: 75 t
- Length: 110 ft (34 m)
- Beam: 13 ft 6 in (4.11 m)
- Draft: 6 ft 3 in (1.91 m)
- Propulsion: 3 × 660 hp (490 kW) Standard gasoline engines; 3 shafts
- Speed: 18 kn (33 km/h)
- Endurance: 1,000 nmi (1,900 km) at 12 kn (22 km/h)
- Complement: 26
- Armament: 1 × 3"/23 caliber gun mount; 3 × .30 caliber machine guns; 1 × Y gun depth charge projector

USS SC-142, sometimes styled as either Submarine Chaser No. 142 or S.C.-142, was an SC-1-class submarine chaser built for the United States Navy during World War I. Upon completion, she was transferred to the French Navy.

SC-142 was built at Rocky River Dry Dock Co. in Rocky River, Ohio, probably in 1917.

On 15 April 1918 SC-142 left Bermuda in a convoy with 29 other submarine chasers, four U.S. Navy tugs, two French tugs and destroyer tender Bridgeport. Cruiser Salem and armed yacht Wadena performed escort duty for the convoy. On 25 April, SC-142 was taken under tow for a time by Bridgeport, and two days later, the convoy reached Ponta Delgada, Azores.

The ultimate fate of SC-142 is unknown.
