= USS Tillamook (SP-269) =

Patrol vessel of the United States Navy

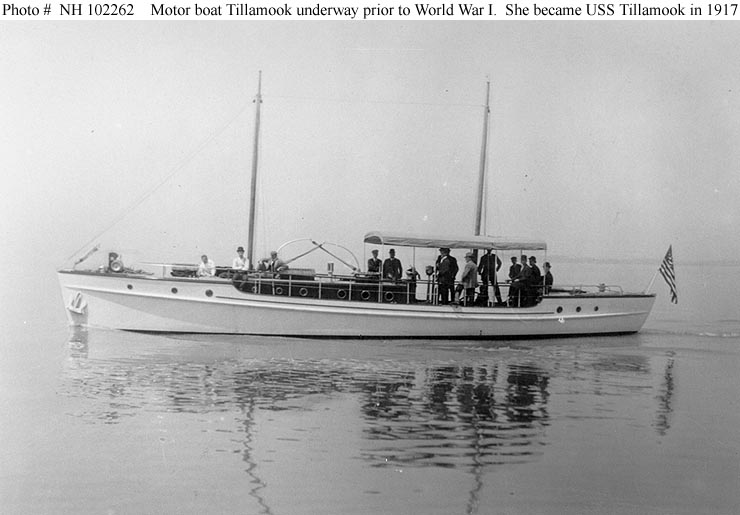
- Tillamook as a civilian motorboat or yacht sometime between 1911 and 1917, prior to her U.S. Navy service.

History

United States
- Name: USS Tillamook (1917-1918); USS SP-269
- Namesake: Tillamook, her previous name retained, was for the Tillamook, a large and prominent Coast Salish Native American tribe which occupied the shores of Tillamook Bay and its tributary rivers in northwestern Oregon; SP-269 was her section patrol number
- Builder: Matthews Boat Company, Port Clinton, Ohio
- Completed: 1911
- Acquired: 14 May 1917
- Commissioned: 1 June 1917
- Renamed: USS SP-269 either on 1 June 1917 or in early 1918
- Fate: Sold 20 November 1919
- Notes: Operated as civilian motorboat or yacht Tillamook 1911-1917

General characteristics
- Type: Patrol vessel
- Tonnage: 24 Gross register tons
- Length: 59 ft 0 in (17.98 m)
- Beam: 12 ft 6 in (3.81 m)
- Draft: 4 ft 9 in (1.45 m)
- Speed: 9.5 knots
- Complement: 9
- Armament: 1 × 3-pounder gun; 2 × machine guns

The second USS Tillamook (SP-269), later USS SP-269, was a United States Navy patrol vessel in commission from 1917 to 1919.

Tillamook was built as a civilian motorboat or motor yacht of the same name in 1911 by the Matthews Boat Company at Port Clinton, Ohio. The U.S. Navy purchased her from her owner, Mr. D. C. Whitney of Detroit, Michigan, on 14 May 1917 for World War I service as a patrol vessel. She was commissioned on 1 June 1917 as USS Tillamook (SP-269), although some sources claim that she was commissioned as USS SP-269 rather than under her civilian name.

Assigned to the 9th Naval District—at the time functioning as part of a single administrative entity known as the "9th, 10th, and 11 Naval Districts" -- Tillamook patrolled the waters of Lake Michigan. According to some sources her name change to USS SP-269 occurred during this time, early in 1918. Whenever her name change occurred, it was to avoid confusion between her and the tug USS Tillamook (Tug No. 16), which was in commission at the same time. Despite her name change, official papers often continued to refer to her as Tillamook (SP-269), particularly those regarding her disposal in 1919.

SP-269 remained active in the 9th Naval District until the autumn of 1919. She was sold to Mr. George Jerome of Detroit on 20 November 1919.
