= Sol Duc (steamship) =

1912 steamboat in United States

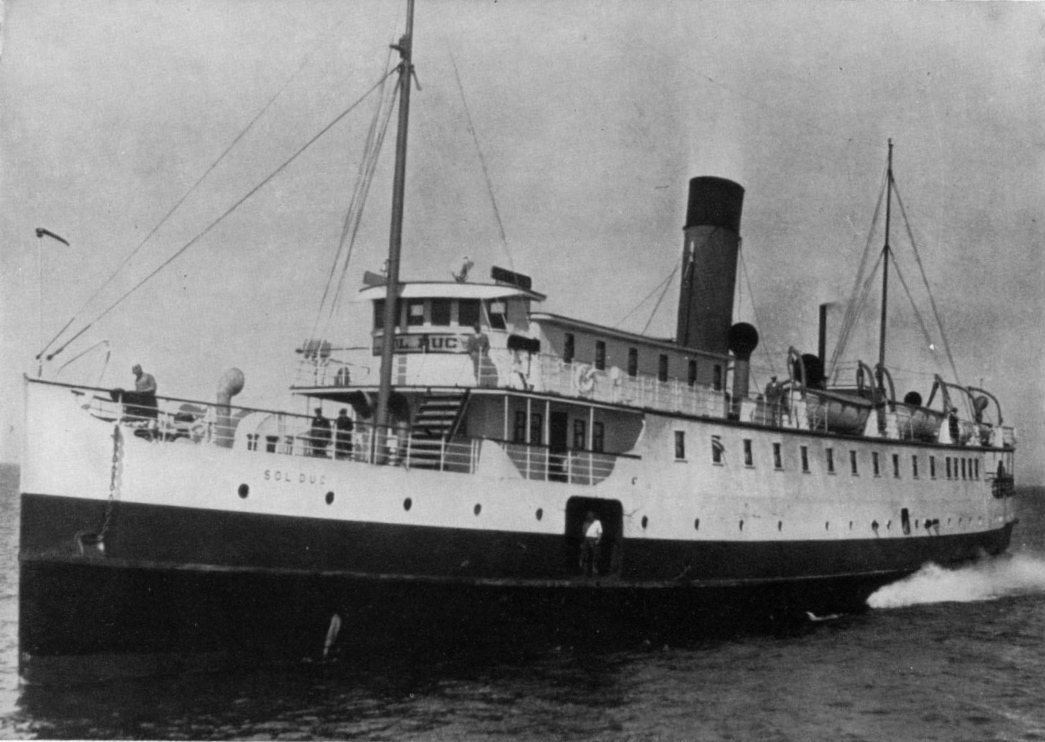

History
- Name: Sol Duc
- Owner: Puget Sound Navigation Co., U.S. Navy
- Route: Puget Sound, Strait of Juan de Fuca
- Builder: Seattle Const. & Drydock Co.
- Launched: May 28, 1912
- Completed: June 1912
- Out of service: 1947
- Identification: US registry #210133
- Fate: Scrapped
- Notes: Designated YHB-8 during WW2 naval service

General characteristics
- Type: coastal steamship
- Tonnage: 1075 gross tons
- Length: 189 ft (57.61 m)
- Beam: 31.5 ft (9.60 m)
- Depth: 22.6 ft (6.89 m) depth of hold
- Installed power: compound steam engine; cylinder bores 17 in (43.2 cm), 28 in (71.1 cm)and 47.5 in (120.7 cm); stroke 36 in (91.4 cm), 1,500 hp (1,100 kW)

Sol Duc was a steamship which was operated on northern Puget Sound from 1912 to 1935, chiefly on a route connecting ports on the Olympic Peninsula with Seattle. During the Second World War (1941–1945) Sol Duc served as a barracks ship.

== Design and constructions ==
Following the loss of the nearly-new but wooden steamship Clallam in 1904, Joshua Green, president of the Puget Sound Navigation Company, owner of the Clallam and the dominant Puget Sound shipping concern, announced that the company would replace its wooden steamships with ones built of steel. As part of this effort, the steel steamers Sol Duc and Potlatch. were built simultaneously in Seattle by the Seattle Construction and Drydock Company. Sol Duc was specifically designed for the Seattle – Port Townsend-Port Angeles-Port Crescent route.

Sol Duc was the largest steamship built to that date for the Puget Sound Navigation Company. Although similar in appearance to Potlatch, at 1,085 gross tons, Sol Duc almost twice as large. Dimensions for Sol Duc were length 189 ft (57.61 m) beam of 31.5 ft (9.60 m) and depth of hold of 22.6 ft (6.89 m). Power was supplied by a triple-expansion compound steam engine with cylinder diameters, from high pressure to low pressure, of 17 in (43.2 cm), 28 in (71.1 cm)and 47.5 in (120.7 cm), with piston strokes on all cylinders of 36 in (91.4 cm). Steam was generated by two oil-fired water-tube boilers at 225 pounds pressure, with the overall power plant generating 1,500 horsepower (1,100 kW).

The unusual name of the steamer was chosen to tie in to Michael Earles new health spa located at the Sol Duc hot springs in the foothills of the Olympic Mountains.

== Operation ==
In addition to the Seattle-Port Townsend-Port Angeles-Port Crescent route, Sol Duc also made runs across the Strait of Juan de Fuca to Victoria, British Columbia. The vessel was unfortunately prone to roll excessively when encountering rough weather in the strait.

In the summer of 1928, Sol Duc was replaced on the Olympic route with the Iroquois which had been rebuilt as a ferry. Sol Duc and other steamships could transport automobiles, but only as freight. This meant that cars had to be partially dismantled, such as having the tires removed, so that they could fit into the hold.

In 1929, Sol Duc replaced Kulshan on the Seattle-Bellingham run, only running as a night freight boat. Sol Duc stayed on this run until November 1935. A strike forced Puget Sound Navigation Co. to stop operating Sol Duc and other vessels. After the strike was over, the company took Sol Duc out of service.

One of the captains of Sol Duc was Harry Carter (1858–1930), who had also commanded State of Washington and a number of other well-known vessels. Another captain of Sol Duc was J. Howard Payne (1889–1956), who in 1917 at the age of 24 was in command of the vessel on the Seattle-Port Angeles-Victoria route. Payne later became a member of the Washington State Legislature.

== Final years ==
Unlike Potlatch and other steel steamers, Sol Duc was not scrapped in the late 1930s. In 1942, Sol Duc was taken over by the U.S. Navy and for use as a barracks ship, and renamed YHB-8, meaning “self-propelled houseboat no. 8.” After World War II, Sol Duc was sold to Freeman & Gibson, a Seattle firm. The vessel was finally scrapped by Bethlehem Steel.
