= MV Governor =

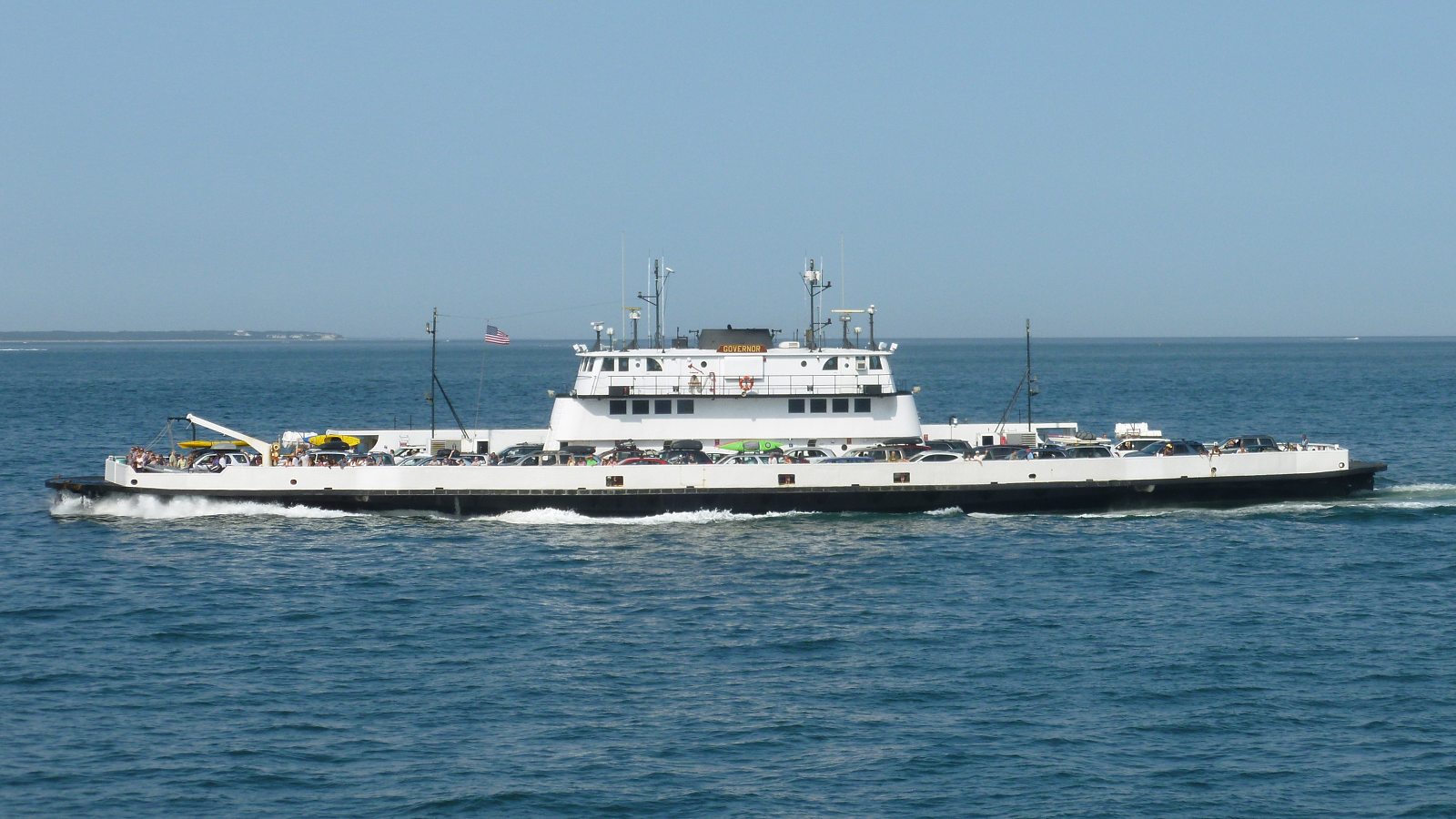
- MV Governor travelling to Woods Hole, Massachusetts on 10 August 2014.

History
- Name: 1954-1970: Crown City; 1970-1982: Kulshan; 1982-Present: Governor
- Owner: 1954-1970: San Diego and Coronado Ferry Company; 1970-1982: Washington State Ferries; 1982-26 July 1997: United States Coast Guard; 1997-Present: Steamship Authority
- Route: Clinton-Mukilteo (as MV Kulshan)
- Builder: Oakland, California
- Yard number: 267527
- Completed: 1954
- In service: 1954
- Refit: 1970
- Identification: IMO number: 8835308; MMSI number: 367345940; Callsign: WCY4957
- Status: In service
- Notes: (As Kulshan): Official Number: 267527; Call Sign: WF6787; Name Translation: From the Lummi/Nooksack language - Great White Watcher; the native name for Mount Baker

General characteristics
- Tonnage: 678
- Length: 242 ft 1.5 in (74 m)
- Beam: 65 ft 1.5 in (19.9 m)
- Draft: 12 ft 9 in (3.9 m)
- Deck clearance: 16 ft 0 in (4.9 m)
- Installed power: Total 1,200 hp from 2 x Diesel-Electric engines
- Speed: 13 kn (24 km/h)
- Capacity: 350 passengers; 59 vehicles (max 24 commercial)

MV Governor is a passenger ferry that operates in Massachusetts. She was formerly the MV Crown City between 1954 and 1970, and the MV Kulshan between 1970 and 1982.

Currently operated by the Steamship Authority, she was built in 1954 to operate the ferry service from San Diego to Coronado, California. After the San Diego-Coronado Bridge was built, spanning her original route, she was sold to Washington State Ferries where she was christened the MV Kulshan and served in Puget Sound waters from 1970 to 1982. Along with the distinction of being the most despised ferry in the WSF fleet, the Kulshan was featured as the ferry ridden by Lisa Blount and Debra Winger in the 1982 film, An Officer and a Gentleman.

After her stint with the Washington State Ferries system, the Kulshan was declared surplus to requirements and sold to the United States Coast Guard to provide service for their large Atlantic Area headquarters base on Governors Island in New York Harbor, an island community and workplace for 5000 people. The ferry was towed south and through the Panama Canal in making its way to the east coast. Once in New York City, the ferry was renamed Governor and as part of a fleet of two other ferries, the Samuel L. Coursen and the Minue, shuttled passengers and vehicles from the Battery Maritime Building in Lower Manhattan to Governors Island.

The closure of the Governors Island Coast Guard base in 1996 made her surplus for a third time whereupon she was purchased by SSA in 1998. The double-ended Governor is the widest and second-longest vessel in the SSA fleet, with a beam of 65 feet and a length of 242 ft, and is the only vessel with diesel-electric propulsion. Three Caterpillar diesel engines power two electric propulsion motors giving her a speed of 12 kn (14 mph).

In October 2007, the MV Governor was involved in a minor collision with the ferry MV Island Home as Governor was beginning a hazardous cargo trip to the Vineyard. No passengers were on board or injured in the incident. Coast Guard marine safety inspectors examined both ships and permitted the Island Home to return to service about one hour after her scheduled departure time with only a dent in the hull, above the waterline. The MV Governor required slightly more repair, but was back in service by the end of the day. Petty Officer Lauren Downs of the Coast Guard stated "Results of standard drug and alcohol tests on Governor's crew, after the accident, were negative".
