= Potlatch (steamship) =

Steamship

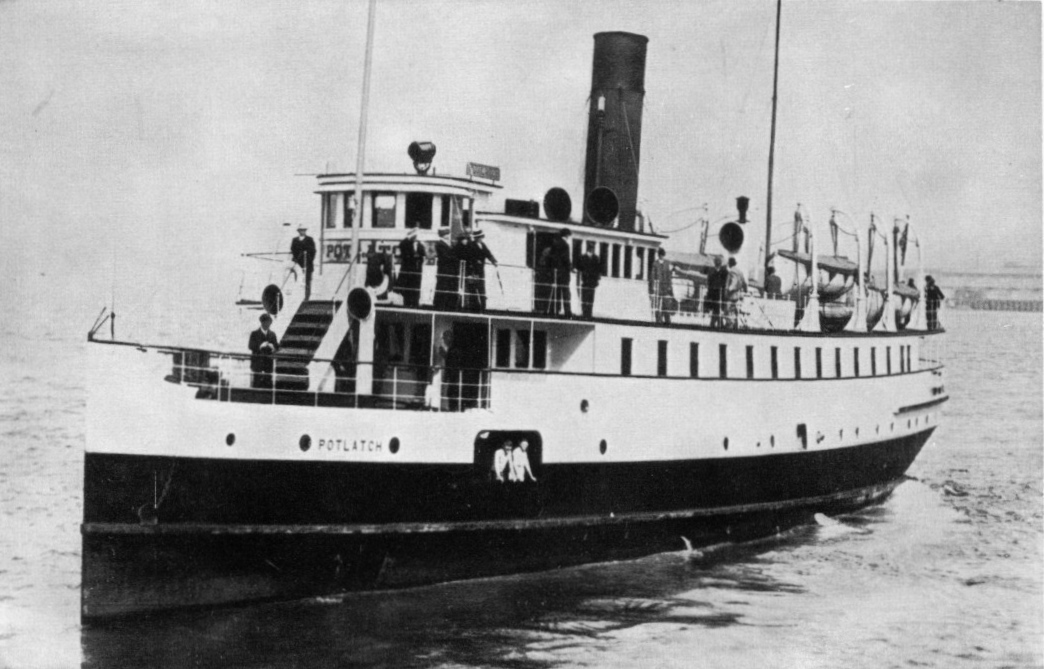

History
- Name: Potlatch
- Owner: Puget Sound Navigation Co.
- Route: Hood Canal
- Completed: 1912
- In service: 1912
- Out of service: 1937
- Identification: US registry #210378
- Fate: Scrapped

General characteristics
- Type: inland steamboat
- Length: 150 ft (45.72 m)
- Beam: 26.8 ft (8.17 m)
- Depth: 16.8 ft (5.12 m) depth of hold
- Installed power: compound steam engine; cylinder bores 15 in (38.1 cm), 24 in (61.0 cm)and 38 in (96.5 cm); stroke 24 in (61.0 cm)

Potlatch was a steamship which was operated on Hood Canal from 1912 to 1917, on Puget Sound from 1917 to 1937, although the vessel was little used after 1917.

== Design and construction ==
Following the loss of the nearly-new but wooden steamship Clallam in 1904, Joshua Green, president of the Puget Sound Navigation Company, owner of the Clallam and the dominant Puget Sound shipping concern, announced that the company would replace its wooden steamships with ones built of steel. As part of this effort, the steel steamers Potlatch and Sol Duc were built simultaneously in Seattle by the Seattle Construction and Drydock Company. Potlatch was specifically designed for the Seattle – Hood Canal route.

Potlatch was 575 gross tons in overall size, 150 ft (45.72 m) long, with a beam of 26.8 ft (8.17 m) and depth of hold of 16.8 ft (5.12 m). Power was supplied by a triple-expansion compound steam engine with cylinder diameters, from high pressure to low pressure, of 15 in (38.1 cm), 24 in (61.0 cm)and 38 in (96.5 cm), with piston strokes on all cylinders of 24 in (61.0 cm). Steam was generated by two oil-fired boilers at 200 pounds (per square inch) pressure, with the overall power plant generating 600 horsepower (450 kW).

== Operation ==
Potlatch replaced the old sternwheeler State of Washington on the Hood Canal route. In 1917, Puget Sound Navigation Co. terminated its Hood Canal service, and Potlatch was sold.

== Disposition ==
Potlatch was little used following the termination of the Hood Canal service and its sale. In 1937, Potlatch was sold by the Georgia Company, a Puget Sound towing company, to Otis Shively who was doing business as the Shively Tow Boat Company. In 1938 the vessel was scrapped.
