= USS SC-277 =

WWI US submarine chaser

History

United States
- Name: USS SC-277
- Builder: Mare Island Navy Yard; Mare Island, California
- Launched: 31 July 1917
- Commissioned: 9 April 1918
- Decommissioned: 15 June 1922
- Fate: Sold on 25 September 1922; Ultimate fate unknown

General characteristics
- Class & type: SC-1-class submarine chaser
- Displacement: 85 t
- Length: 110 ft (34 m)
- Beam: 13 ft 6 in (4.11 m)
- Draft: 6 ft 3 in (1.91 m)
- Propulsion: 3 × 660 hp (490 kW) Standard gasoline engines; 3 shafts
- Speed: 18 knots (33 km/h; 21 mph)
- Endurance: 1,000 nmi (1,900 km) at 12 kn (22 km/h)
- Complement: 27
- Armament: 1 × 3"/23 caliber gun mount; 3 × .30 caliber machine guns; 1 × Y gun depth charge projector

USS SC-277, sometimes styled as either Submarine Chaser No. 277 or S.C.-277, was an SC-1-class submarine chaser built for the United States Navy during World War I. Like most members of her class, she was not named and known only by her designation.

SC-277 was laid down at the Mare Island Navy Yard at Mare Island, California; launched on 31 July 1917; and commissioned 9 April 1918. The sub chaser conducted three trials between 11 April and 1 May, and on 3 May departed Mare Island.

While at Ponta Delgada, Azores, SC-277 received a repair party from destroyer tender Bridgeport on or after 30 April 1918.

On 17 July 1920 SC-277 received, as part of the new U.S. Navy letter-number scheme, the hull designation of PC-277. She returned to Mare Island on 17 October 1920.

SC-277 was decommissioned on 15 June 1922 and sold on 25 September 1922 to M. Levin & Sons of San Francisco, California. Her ultimate fate is unknown.
