= USS SC-255 =

History

United States
- Name: USS SC-255
- Builder: George Lawley & Sons; Neponset, Massachusetts
- Commissioned: 19 November 1917
- Fate: Sold on 24 June 1921; Ultimate fate unknown

General characteristics
- Class & type: SC-1-class submarine chaser
- Displacement: 75 t
- Length: 110 ft (34 m)
- Beam: 13 ft 6 in (4.11 m)
- Draft: 6 ft 3 in (1.91 m)
- Propulsion: 3 × 660 hp (490 kW) Standard gasoline engines; 3 shafts
- Speed: 18 knots (33 km/h; 21 mph)
- Complement: 17
- Armament: 1 × 3"/23 caliber gun mount; 3 × .30 caliber machine guns; 1 × Y gun depth charge projector

USS SC-255, sometimes styled as either Submarine Chaser No. 255 or S.C.-255, was an SC-1-class submarine chaser built for the United States Navy during World War I. Like most members of her class, she was not named and known only by her designation.

SC-255 was built at George Lawley & Sons in Neponset, Massachusetts in 1917. She was commissioned 19 November 1917.

On 15 April 1918 SC-255 left Bermuda in a convoy with 29 other submarine chasers, four U.S. Navy tugs, two French tugs and destroyer tender Bridgeport. Cruiser Salem and armed yacht Wadena performed escort duty for the convoy. On 24 April, SC-255 was taken under tow for a time by Bridgeport, and three days later, the convoy reached Ponta Delgada, Azores.

At some point in her career, SC-255 entered dry dock in Malta.

It is unclear if SC-255 remained in commission on 17 July 1920. If she were, she would have received, as part of the new U.S. Navy letter-number scheme, the hull designation of PC-255.

SC-255 was sold on 24 June 1921 to Joseph G. Hitner of Philadelphia. Her ultimate fate is unknown.
