= USS Arapaho (AT-14) =

Tugboat of the United States Navy

History

United States
- Name: USS Arapaho
- Namesake: An important plains tribe of the Algonquian family, closely associated with the Cheyenne.
- Builder: Seattle Construction and Drydock Company, Seattle, Washington
- Cost: $125,666.67 (hull and machinery)
- Laid down: 16 December 1913
- Launched: 20 June 1914
- Acquired: by the Navy, 2 December 1914
- Commissioned: 8 February 1918 as USS Arapaho
- Decommissioned: 6 April 1922 at the Philadelphia Navy Yard
- In service: 1914
- Out of service: 1917
- Reclassified: (AT-14), 17 July 1920; Yard Tug (YT-121), 27 February 1936
- Stricken: 22 December 1936
- Home port: Mare Island, California, Norfolk, Virginia, Philadelphia, Pennsylvania
- Fate: Sold to A. S. Hughes' Sons, Philadelphia, on 5 May 1937; fate unknown

General characteristics
- Type: Arapaho-class tugboat
- Displacement: 575 long tons (584 t)
- Length: 122 ft 6 in (37.34 m)
- Beam: 24 ft (7.3 m)
- Draft: 12 ft 10 in (3.91 m)
- Propulsion: steam engine; 1 × shaft
- Speed: 11 kn (13 mph; 20 km/h)
- Complement: 25 officers and enlisted
- Armament: 2 × 3-pounders

USS Arapaho (AT-14/YT-121) was an Arapaho-class fleet tug that performed various tugboat services for the United States Navy. She was constructed in Seattle, Washington; however, she spent most of her working career on the East Coast of the United States, primarily at Norfolk, Virginia, and Philadelphia, Pennsylvania.

== Launched in Seattle, Washington ==
The name Arapaho (sometimes spelled Arapahoe) was assigned on 9 May 1914 to a tug that had been laid down unnamed on 16 December 1913 at Seattle, Washington, by the Seattle Construction and Drydock Company. Launched on 20 June 1914, Arapaho was delivered to the Navy on 2 December 1914. Placed in an "in service" status as befitting a yard craft, Arapaho performed tug and tow duty at the Mare Island Navy Yard, Vallejo, California through 1917. Classified as a fleet tug on 15 December 1915, the ship was commissioned on 8 February 1918 at the Mare Island Navy Yard.

== World War I service ==
Ordered to the Atlantic Fleet, Arapaho departed Mare Island, California on 25 February 1918 and, after transiting the Panama Canal, reached Norfolk, Virginia on 6 April. The tug operated with the Atlantic Fleet, primarily out of Norfolk, Virginia, through the armistice of 11 November. Assigned to the Atlantic Fleet Train, Arapaho towed target rafts and barges and performed routine mooring buoy maintenance at Hampton Roads, Virginia, and occasionally ranged with the fleet to Guantanamo and Guayancanabo Bays, Cuba, and Narragansett Bay, Rhode Island.

== Post-war service ==
During the fleet movement to Guantanamo in January 1920, Arapaho – in company with the minesweepers Cormorant, Quail, Mallard, and Lark – towed target rafts and barges to Guantanamo for the fleet's use during the annual winter maneuvers there.

Although detached from the Train on 1 January 1920, Arapaho was apparently not assigned to the 4th Naval District (Philadelphia, Pennsylvania) until 29 February. During the first year of operations out of her new home port and yard, she was classified as AT-14 during the fleet-wide assignment of alphanumeric hull numbers on 17 July. That autumn, in company with Leonidas, she laid out a torpedo range from 19 October-1 November in the lower Potomac River. Upon completion of this duty, Arapaho returned to the Philadelphia Navy Yard for a resumption of her previous duties.

== Decommissioning ==
Arapaho remained assigned to the 4th Naval District until decommissioned at Philadelphia on the afternoon of 6 April 1922. She remained in reserve there – reclassified, while inactive, as a yard tug YT-121 on 27 February 1936 – until struck from the Naval Vessel Register on 22 December. Two days later, Arapaho was ordered to be sold, and she was eventually purchased by A. S. Hughes' Sons, Philadelphia on 5 May 1937.
