= Seattle Construction and Drydock Company =

Defunct shipyard in Seattle, Washington, U.S.

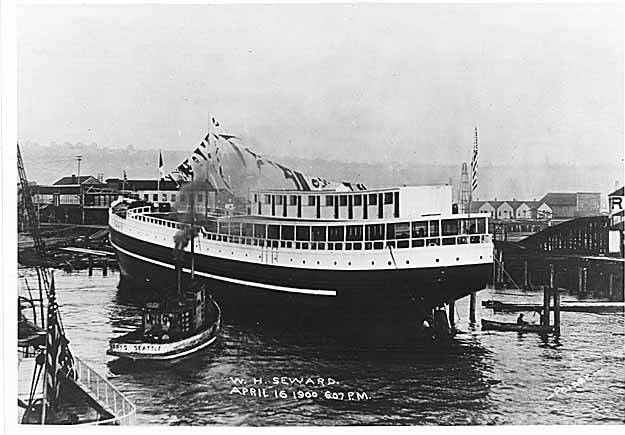
WH Seward being launched at Moran Brothers Shipyard April 16, 1900

The Seattle Construction and Drydock Company was a shipbuilding company based in Seattle, Washington. Between 1911 and 1918, it produced a substantial number of ships for both commercial and military uses. In the beginning of the 20th century, until its significance was diluted by the emergence of a number of shipyards during the World War I shipbuilding boom, it was the largest of its kind in Seattle and one of the few significant ship yards along the West Coast of the United States, second only to the Union Iron Works in San Francisco.

== History ==
Formally established in 1911, the shipyard could trace its history back to 1882, when the Moran brothers operated a machine shop at Yesler's Wharf (47.60110°N 122.337660°W) in the lower story of a new sawmill employing 8 to 10 men, built by John Anderson and owned by Anderson and Henry Yesler, who is often regarded as the founder of the city of Seattle. At the end of the year 1882 they were constructing their own 24 by 40 feet two-story machine shop next to the Yesler mill. In 1884 Moran Brothers built the machinery for William Moore's steamship Teaser.

The Seattle Dry Dock & Shipbuilding Company was established in 1888, with Bailey Gatzert as president, Robert Moran as vice president and $75,000 in capital. It was located at the foot of Charles Street (47.59498°N 122.3375°W, all subsequent extensions of the yard were from foot of Charles street southward). Machinery was bought in New York during a visit by Robert Moran in the spring and arrived late in 1888. Work on the dry dock was expected to be complete by April 1889. Robert Moran was elected mayor of Seattle on 9 July 1888 and while his shop became a victim of the Great Seattle Fire of 6 June 1889, the business continued to expand and became the Moran Brothers Shipyard.

The Moran Brothers Co. was incorporated 19 December 1889 with a capital stock of $250,000 and no stock held outside the company. A newly built foundry on Charles street was employing 70 men in February 1890 (detailed description of the new plant:). In 1902 there was a bonded debt of $500,000 first mortgage, 5% interest maturing from 1906 to 1912 and a stock of $1,000,000.

On February 27, 1906, the Moran family left the business, the yard was sold for $2,000,000 to Bertron, Storrs and Griscom of New York, who also gained the right to the company name and the yard now operated as The Moran Company and was bought by (unknown) on 30 December 1911 and became the Seattle Construction and Drydock Company. J. V. Patterson was president of both companies during the 1906 to 1916 period. A second mortgage ($1,000,000 10 year 6% bonds dated 1 January 1912) was taken and a new 10,000 ton dry dock planned. Naval constructor Holden A. Evans (also a book author) resigned from the navy to become new vice president of the company.

In July 1916, William H. Todd made one of the first acquisitions for Todd Shipyards that would become a national enterprise, later on by buying Seattle Construction and Drydock. Todd's business at that time consisted of Robins Dry Dock and Repair Company at Eire Basin in Red Hook, Brooklyn, and in Weehawken Cove, Hoboken. Planned modernizations in 1916 included the addition of 2 slipways to the existing 3 and a new 15,000 ton dry dock to augment the 3 in operation (the dry dock apparently was not actually built). At the same time, Skinner & Eddy became a major shipbuilder in Seattle, their facilities built from the ground up starting in February 1916 directly adjacent to the Seattle Construction yard. In 1918 Todd moved to the north end of Harbor Island to open a repair dock and Skinner & Eddy took control of both yards on the waterfront. The transfer took place on 11 May 1918, the price was $4,000,000. Skinner & Eddy were to pay the Emergency Fleet Corporation for the yard at a rate of $125,000 per completed ship. The Seattle Construction and Dry Dock Company was henceforth called Skinner & Eddy Plant No. 2.

Skinner & Eddy invested approx. $1,000,000 to modernize the plant, but defaulted on their payments after having paid $514,441.40 and the EFC repossessed the yard on 22 March 1920. On 21 January 1924 shipways and removable equipment were sold to the Schnitzer and Wolf Machinery Co, of Portland, Oregon (now Radius Recycling) for $226,255 and remaining "Balance of property owned" for $600,000 to the Port of Seattle on 31 December 1923. Three buildings remained "to be disposed of". In the 1930s, the area between Dearborn and Connecticut Street was Seattle's largest Hooverville.

Todd's facilities on Harbor Island would then be expanded in 1940–41 and become the "Seattle" in Seattle-Tacoma Shipbuilding Corporation.

Clarence Bagley, in his History of Seattle from the earliest settlement to the present time, Volume 2, wrote:

The plant of the Moran company, together with that of the Seattle Dry Dock & Ship Building Company, which had been organized in 1887 and was under the control of the Morans, was at this time the most complete on the Pacific Coast, outside of San Francisco. It had grown to such immense proportions that even while the construction of its masterpiece, the (USS) Nebraska, was underway, other work was being handled in the same efficient manner as before the big contract had been secured. Some of the notable work turned out during the period was the building of the steel tugs Bahada and Wyadda, the lighthouse tender Heather and the rebuilding of the steamships Cutch and Willamette.

. . .

When the Nebraska was finished and given her official trial trip in the waters of the Strait of Juan de Fuca, Captain Perkins, senior member of the trial board, pronounced her one of the best vessels in the United States navy. Notwithstanding bad weather, the ship fully met the requirements of the Government and proved that Seattle had a construction company capable of building the largest kind of ship. In March, 1906, the Moran Brothers Company was sold to Eastern capitalists, who reorganized the business under the name of The Moran Company, which, in 1912, became the Seattle Construction & Dry Dock Company. During the year 1911 the company began building the first of six submarine boats for the United States navy. About the same time five steel whalers were built for companies operating in the northern whaling waters, and in 1913 the $500,000 dry dock was completed. This dry dock was 468 feet long and 110 feet wide and the steamship Admiral Farragut was the first vessel to enter it for repairs.

The company produced over 90 ships, including a substantial number of battleships and submarines for the United States Navy, submarines for the Royal Canadian Navy, as well as commercial oceangoing vessels. By 1917, the plant covered about 27 acres (110,000 m^{2}) and employed about 1,500 men. In that year, it had six building slips up to 600 feet (180 m) long; two drydocks of 12,000 tons capacity each, one drydock of 3,000 tons capacity, and was equipped to take care of repairs of all kinds. The company formally ceased operations in 1918, due in large part to the poaching of its skilled laborers by newly established competitors. It ultimately was acquired by William H. Todd, who operated the company as a subsidiary of the Todd Pacific Shipyards Corporation, which had been founded in 1916 as the William H. Todd Corporation. It became the "Seattle" in Seattle-Tacoma Shipbuilding Corporation and operated under that name during World War II as one of the biggest suppliers of escort carriers and destroyers for the United States Navy. Other companies operated by Todd included the Robins Dry Dock and Repair Company at Erie Basin, Red Hook, Brooklyn, the Tietjen & Long Dry Dock Company of Hoboken, New Jersey.

== Ships constructed ==
The construction of USS Omaha (CL-4) was contracted for on 26 December 1916 and for Milwaukee and Cincinnati on 27 August 1917. All three of the ships were laid down after long delays by the Todd yard in Tacoma.

Yard#	Owner	Name	Type	Contracted	Launched (Note: See List of ship launches in 1914 through 1918 for references)	Delivered
Ships built by Moran Brothers (selection)
1	Navy	Rowan				
36	King County	King County				
41	Navy	Nebraska	battleship	7 Mar 01	7 Oct 04	31 May 07
Ships built by The Moran Company (selection)
55	Navy	F-3	submarine	5 Mar 09	6 Jan 12	5 Aug 12
56	Navy	F-4	submarine			
57	Puget Sound Navigation Company	Kulshan				
58	Puget Sound Navigation Company	Sioux				
59	Navy	H-3	submarine	10 Aug 10	3 Jul 13	16 Jan 14
62	Navy	K-4	submarine	31 May 11	19 Mar 14	26 Oct 14
Ships built by the Seattle Construction and Dry Dock Company (selection)
68	Puget Sound Navigation Company	Sol Duc				
69	Chile / Canada	Iquique	submarine			
70	Chile / Canada	Antofogasta	submarine			
71	Puget Sound Navigation Company	Potlatch				
73	Puget Sound Navigation Company	Tacoma				
74	Puget Sound Navigation Company	Comanche				
78	Navy	Bushnell (AS-2)	submarine tender	30 Jun 13	9 Feb 15	
79	Navy	Arapaho (AT-14)	oceangoing tug	30 Jun 13	20 Jun 14	
80	Navy	Mohave (AT-15)	oceangoing tug	30 Jun 13	20 Jul 14 or 20 Jun 14	
81	Navy	Tillamook (AT-16)	oceangoing tug	30 Jun 13	15 Aug 14	
Seattle Constr. activities as part of the Todd Corporation (complete)
82	Navy	N-1	submarine	19 Mar 15 (Note: Contractor was the Electric Boat Company, New York. Date of subcontract unknown.)	30 Dec 16	26 Sep 17
83	Navy	N-2	submarine	19 Mar 15	16 Jan 17	26 Sep 17
84	Navy	N-3	submarine	19 Mar 15	21 Feb 17	26 Sep 17
85	New York & Cuba Mail Line (Note: For some time these ships were in the hands of the USSB, but they were not "commandeered existing construction")	Cauto	cargo		23 Sep 16	9 Dec 16
86	New York & Cuba Mail Line	Panuco	cargo		21 Oct 16	9 Jan 17
87	Navy	Gwin	destroyer	8 Mar 16	20 Dec 17	18 Mar 20
88	Knut Knutsen, Norway	Golden Gate	cargo		14 Mar 17	10 May 17
89		Key West	cargo		11 Apr 17	16 Jun 17
90	Haakon Wallen Co., Norway	Storviken	cargo		6 Jun 17	23 Jul 17
91	Edgar F. Luckenbach / Req. (Note: Requisitioned by USSB)	Walter A. Luckenbach	10,500dwt cargo	9 Feb 16	15 Dec 17	31 May 18
92	Norwegian / Req.	Hull No. 92	7,500dwt cargo	3 Apr 16	21 Nov 17	28 Jan 18
93	Willy Gilbert / Req.	Southerland	7,500dwt cargo	11 Aug 16	19 Jan 18	16 May 18
94	Willy Gilbert / Req.	Bremerton	7,500dwt cargo	11 Aug 16	27 Mar 18	24 Apr 18
95	Willy Gilbert / Req.	Vittorio Emanuelle III	7,500dwt cargo	11 Aug 16	24 May 18	27 Jun 18
96	Barber SS Co. / Req		7,500dwt cargo	2 Oct 16	Transferred to and laid down in Tacoma	
97–99, 101-103	Cunard Line / Req.		7,500dwt cargo	14 Feb 17	Transferred to and laid down in Tacoma	
100	Navy	Omaha	cruiser	26 Dec 16	Transferred to and laid down in Tacoma	
106	Navy	Milwaukee	cruiser	27 Aug 17	Transferred to and laid down in Tacoma	
107	Navy	Cincinnati	cruiser	27 Aug 17	Transferred to and laid down in Tacoma	
108	USSB Contract No. 13 (Note: At least four ships of this contract were built by Seattle Construction, the rest were laid down in the just completed Todd Tacoma yard, although they are also attributed to the Seattle Construction and Drydock Company in various sources. USSB hull numbers are oddly confusing wrt. yard numbers. Willimantic USSB #107 through Gaffney USSB #110)	Willimantic	7,500dwt cargo	6 Jun 17	29 May 18	Nov 18
109	USSB Contract No. 13	Deranof	7,500dwt cargo	6 Jun 17	20 Jun 18	Dec 19
110	USSB Contract No. 13	Delight	7,500dwt cargo	6 Jun 17	4 Jul 18 (Note: One of 95 ships launched nationwide on that day)	Sep 19
111	USSB Contract No. 13	Gaffney (Note: attributed to both Seattle Constr. and (errorneously to) Skinner & Eddy, who did not buy the contract together with the yard)	7,500dwt cargo	6 Jun 17	25 Jul 18	Dec 19
