= MV Kulshan =

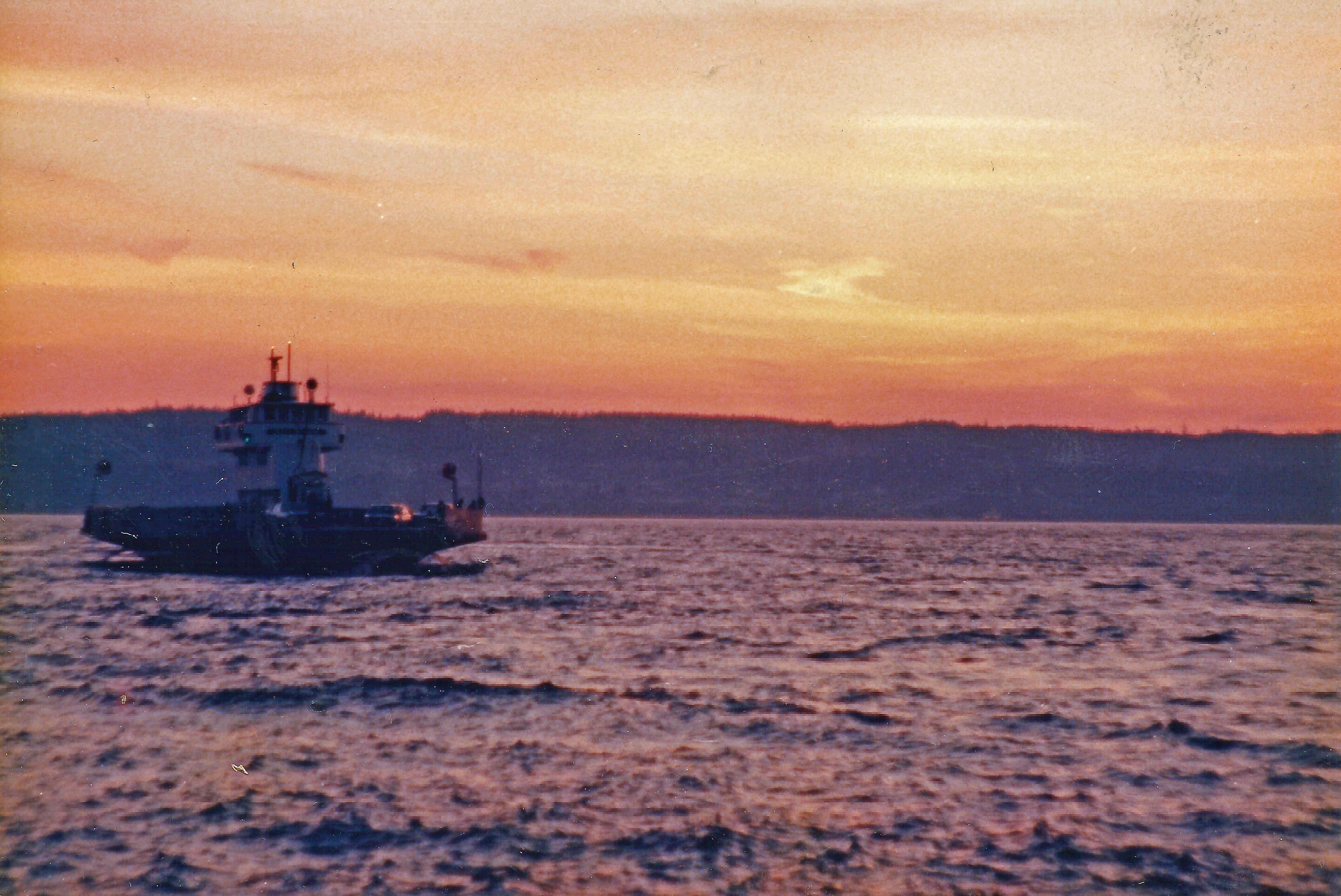
- MV Kulshan

History
- Name: 1954–1970: Crown City; 1970–1982: Kulshan; 1982-26 July 1997: Governor; 1997–Present: Governor
- Owner: 1954–1970: San Diego and Coronado Ferry Company; 1970–1982: Washington State Ferries; 1982-26 July 1997: United States Coast Guard; 1997–Present: Woods Hole, Martha's Vineyard and Nantucket Steamship Authority
- Operator: 1970–1982: Washington State Ferries
- Port of registry: Seattle, USA
- Route: Clinton-Mukilteo
- Yard number: 267527
- Launched: Oakland, California
- Christened: 1970
- Completed: Built: 1954; Refit: 1970
- Acquired: 1970
- In service: 1954
- Out of service: 1982
- Identification: IMO number: 8835308; Official Number: 267527; Call sign: WF6787
- Notes: Name Translation: From the Lummi/Nooksack language – Great White Watcher; the native name for Mount Baker

General characteristics
- Tonnage: 678
- Length: 242 ft 1.5 in (74 m)
- Beam: 65 ft 1.5 in (19.9 m)
- Draft: 12 ft 9 in (3.9 m)
- Deck clearance: 16 ft 0 in (4.9 m)
- Installed power: Total 1,200 hp from 2 x Diesel-Electric engines
- Speed: 13 kn (24 km/h)
- Capacity: 350 passengers; 59 vehicles (max 24 commercial)

MV Kulshan was a passenger ferry operated by the Washington State ferry system on Puget Sound from 1970 to 1982.

== Beginnings ==
The Kulshan started her maritime career as the MV Crown City in Oakland, California in 1954. Purchased by the San Diego and Coronado Ferry Company, the Kulshan/Crown City served as a passenger ferry there until the San Diego-Coronado bridge was completed in 1969. Other ferries running between San Diego and Coronado alongside her were the MV San Diego, the MV Coronado II, the MV Silver Strand, and the MV North Island.

== The ugliest, most despised ferry in Puget Sound ==
Following her decommissioning by the San Diego and Coronado Ferry Company, the vessel was purchased by the Washington State Ferry system in 1969, where she was re-christened the MV Kulshan. After being refitted with new Washington State Ferries livery, the Kulshan was placed on the Mukilteo-Clinton two-mile run. Alongside the Kulshan, other ferries operating on the route were the MV Olympic and MV Rhododendron from 1970 to 1972. Occasionally, the MV Chetzemoka was added as a fourth ferry on the run. In 1973, the Olympic was taken off the route and replaced with the Vashon. In 1978, the Olympic returned to the Mukilteo-Clinton run, and the larger Steel Electric Class MV Illahee, was added to the mix. Unfortunately for the Kulshan, her open decks and flat, barge-like appearance made her infamous in Puget Sound, rather than beloved and appreciated. Unlike her numerous Washington passenger ferry sailing companions, the Kulshan was considered "ugly" as well as "loathed" and "despised". Experienced cross-sound travellers were accustomed to getting on board – either on foot or with their vehicle – and then going upstairs to main passenger cabin or the onboard galley for refreshments. While there were public restrooms on board in the central island structure, the vessel was not equipped with, nor did it have room for, the usual Washington State Ferry amenities. Passengers were able to walk the car-deck, but on anything other than a clear and/or sunny day this was not a very comfortable option. During any time of year other than summer, the waters of Possession Sound were frequently rough and filled with white-caps and waves known to breach over the vessel's bulwark, consequently soaking the cars (and sometimes the passengers) on board.

== Reassignment ==
On February 13, 1979, a powerful, winter windstorm caused a catastrophic failure of the floating Hood Canal Bridge. With the sustained winds at 85 mph (137 km/h) and gusts estimated at 120 mph (193 km/h), the bridge finally succumbed at about 7:00 a.m. The western drawspan and the pontoons of the western half of the bridge had broken loose and sank, forcing those living on the Kitsap Peninsula to take an inconvenient detour. A Hood Canal ferry run was re-established by utilizing the Kulshan between Lofall and South Point across the canal just south of the unusable bridge. This route had previously been active in the 1950s but discontinued after the bridge opened in 1961. During the course of the Hood Canal Bridge closure, an additional ferry route was temporarily added between Edmonds and Port Townsend. As the need increased, the MV Tillikum was also added to the run.

While the Hood Canal Bridge was not reopened again until October 25, 1982, the Kulshan was returned to the Mukilteo-Clinton run in 1981 when she was replaced at Hood Canal by a larger ferry. This time, the Kulshan ran again alongside the MV Illahee and now also the MV Nisqually.

== For one film, a movie star ==
Although the Kulshan was strongly disliked by both Puget Sound locals and visitors, the vessel achieved a positive nod from Hollywood when she was chosen to be forever immortalized in the 1982 Paramount Pictures film, An Officer and a Gentleman. In the first half of the movie, the Kulshan is prominently featured when actresses Lisa Blount (Lynette Pomeroy) and Debra Winger (Paula Pokrifki) take a ride across Puget Sound aboard the "ugly", but perfectly-open-for-filming-purposes, MV Kulshan.

== Last of the Kulshan in Puget Sound ==
In 1983, the MV Kulshan was placed on the Point Defiance-Tahlequah route as a temporary substitute for the MV Hiyu. On her last official passenger run there, the on-board captain rang the final "finished with engines" horn and her tenure with the Washington State Ferries was finished.

== A new life in a new ocean ==
In 1983, the MV Kulshan was sold to the United States Coast Guard for service in Atlantic waters at Governor's Island, New York. While being towed on her way southward toward the Panama Canal, the Kulshan stopped briefly in San Diego in order for ferry historians to see her one last time on the west coast. After arriving in New York Harbor after her long journey, modifications were made to the vessel, including a new passenger lounge at one side and the replacement of the wooden bridge deck bulwarks with steel tubular railings. It was at this time that the MV Kulshan was re-christened the MV Governor and now ran alongside the MV Coursen, MV Minue, and the MV Tides, ferrying passengers between New York City and Governor's Island until the late 1990s.

On July 26, 1997, the Kulshan/Governor took her last sailing for the Coast Guard. The closure of Governor’s Island made the Kulshan/Governor surplus for a third time whereupon she was purchased in 1998 by the Massachusetts-based Woods Hole, Martha's Vineyard and Nantucket Steamship Authority (SSA). The “double-ended” Governor is the longest and widest vessel in the SSA fleet at 242’x 65’ and the only vessel with diesel-electric propulsion. She continues to run proudly as a passenger ferry there to this day.
