= Kulshan (steamship) =

1910 steamboat in United States

- Above : Kulshan circa 1912. below : Advertisement for Kulshan

History
- Name: Kulshan
- Owner: Puget Sound Navigation Co.
- Route: Seattle-Bellingham
- Builder: The Moran Company
- In service: 1910
- Out of service: 1929
- Identification: US registry #207780; flag signal LBPT
- Fate: Scrapped

General characteristics
- Type: inland steamboat
- Tonnage: 926 gross; 573 regist.
- Length: 160.3 ft (48.86 m)
- Beam: 32 ft (9.75 m)
- Depth: 20.7 ft (6.31 m) depth of hold
- Decks: two (2)
- Installed power: triple expansion compound steam engine; cylinders 17 in (43.2 cm) 28 in (71.1 cm)and 47.5 in (120.7 cm); stroke 36 in (91.4 cm)1,100 hp (820 kW)
- Speed: sustained (4 hours): 14.3 knots

Kulshan was a steamship which operated on Puget Sound from 1910 until 1929. When built, Kulshan was one of a newer type of inland steamships constructed entirely of steel, and was then considered one of the finest vessels ever to operate on Puget Sound.

== Nomenclature ==
"Kulshan" was one of the names of Mount Baker in the Lummi language.

== Design and construction ==
Kulshan was built at the Moran Company shipyard in Seattle, Washington and was intended for the Seattle-Bellingham service of the Puget Sound Navigation Company. Built entirely of steel, Kulshan was rated at 926 tons, with dimensions of 160.3 ft (48.86 m) long, 32 ft (9.75 m) beam, and 20.7 ft (6.31 m) depth of hold.

The powerplant was a triple expansion compound steam engine with cylinder bores, from high pressure to low, of 17 in (43.2 cm), 28 in (71.1 cm) and 47.5 in (120.7 cm); stroke was 36 in (91.4 cm) on all cylinders. Two oil-fired boilers generated steam at 225 pounds pressure, developing 1,100 horsepower (820 kW) from the engine. The vessel's specifications required a sustained speed of 13 knots. Kulshan trials easily exceeded the contract speed, averaging 14.32 knots over a four-hour continuous steaming trial. Much of the steel for the construction of the vessel was produced at the Irondale mill near Port Townsend, Washington.

== Operations ==
From 1910 to 1929, Kulshan was assigned to the Seattle-Bellingham route, which also included calls at Everett and Anacortes from 1910 to 1929, replacing the old side-wheeler George E. Starr. Kulshan was initially under the command of Capt. John "Red Jack" Ellsmore (1859–1931), who had previously commanded the sternwheeler State of Washington for 13 years, and was to command Kulshan for another 16 years. Another well-known captain of Kulshan was Henry Carter (1858–1930).

== Disposition ==
After 1929, increasing highway travel meant Kulshan could not be profitably worked, and was taken off the Seattle-Bellingham run. The steamship Sol Duc replaced Kulshan, but only as a night freighter. Unlike some other steel inland steamships, Kulshan was not suitable for conversion into a ferry. The popular and widely experienced Capt. Colin M. "Big Mac" McLennan (1894–1953) was in command of Kulshan on the vessel's last trip into lay up. Kulshan was laid up until 1938, when Puget Sound Navigation sold the steamship to Seattle Iron and Metals Corporation which later scrapped the vessel.
