= Komo Kulshan and his two wives =

Native American creation tale

The story of Komo Kulshan and his two wives is a Lummi tale describing the creations of landmarks in the Pacific Northwest. The story can be broken down into three main sections for each character, Duh-hwahk in the creation of Mount Rainier, Whaht-kway in the creation of the Nooksack River and Spieden Island, and Komo Kulshan in the creation of Mt. Baker. Each of the landmarks is named after the character and is in the Lummi native language. Komo Kulshan translates to "white, shining mountain" or "great white watcher", and his two wives, Duh-hwahk, meaning "clear sky," and Whaht-kway meaning "fair maiden".

== The Lummi ==
The Lummi (/ˈlʌmi/ LUM-ee; Lummi: Xwlemi [χʷləˈmi]; also known as Lhaq'temish (LOCK-tə‐mish), or People of the Sea), are a tribe under the Lummi Nation located along the northernmost area of the western coast of Washington in Whatcom County, and Puget Sound. Traditionally, the Lummi people have traveled back and forth between the sea and the mountains with the seasons.

== Duh-hwahk Creation of Mt. Rainier ==
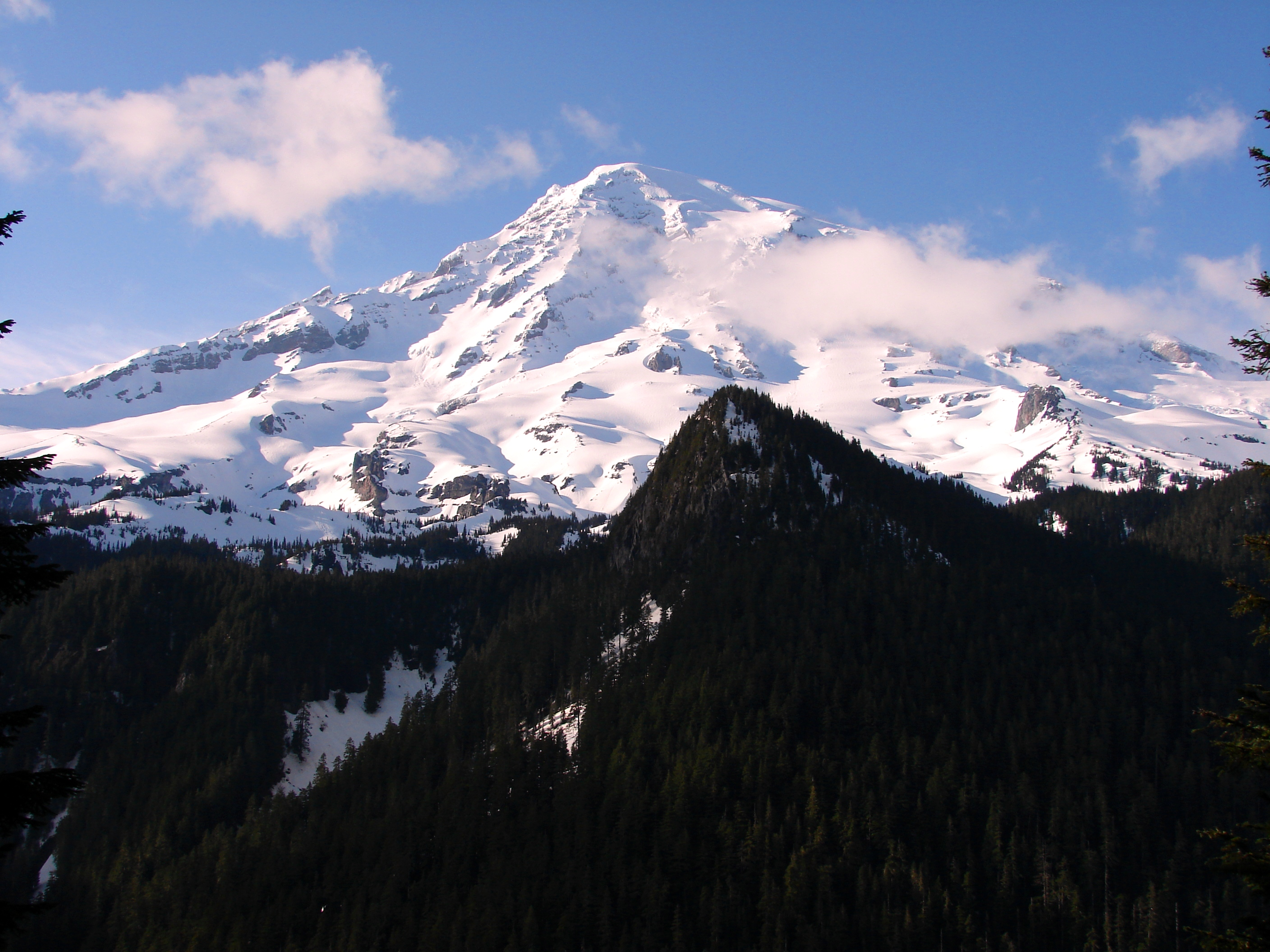
Mt. Rainier in west-central Washington

According to the Lummi people, Duh-hwahk was Komo Kulshan's favorite wife. She was the most beautiful of the pair and eventually gave birth to three children. Whaht-kway was not as beautiful as Duh-hwahk, but was much more kind and charming. Though in time, Komo Kulshan grew to love Whaht-kway more than Duh-hwahk for her caring nature, showering her with affection and attention. This made Duh-hwahk very jealous, as she believed that Komo Kulshan should love her more as she was more beautiful and the mother of his children. So she yelled at him, but he only smiled. Angry, Duh-hwahk threatened to leave him and their children thinking it would make him beg for her to stay, but he did not. Instead, he told her that she may go as soon and as far as she pleased.

So Duh-hwahk slowly packed her things filling her pack with various plants, seeds, and roots. Seeing her packed to leave her children longed for her to stay, which pleased her as surly Komo Kulshan would change his mind and ask her to stay, but he did not. When she left, she moved slowly along the mountain valleys thinking that Komo Kulshan would not be far behind calling for her to come back. But he did not, so she kept on going. Some ways further, she climbed to the top of a hill so they could see her and waited a moment for Komo Kulshan to call her back but he did not. She continued traveling among hills and mountains that slowly got taller until they were out of view. Standing atop an even taller hill, she stretch herself on her tiptoes to be able to see them, but still, Komo Kulshan did not call out. By this time, she was sure that Kulshan did not want her to come back and had become very tall from stretching herself to see her family. So, she made camp where she stood, tending to the garden of plants, seeds, and roots that she brought with her, resting nicely knowing that on clear days her family can see her. Duh-hwahk is now known as Mt. Rainier and it is said that the native plants growing in the spring and summer months are from her garden.

== Whaht-kway, creation of the Nooksack River and Spieden Island ==
Whaht-kway lived with Komo Kulshan many years after Duh-hwahk left and eventually became pregnant with a child. Whaht-kway longed to be with her mother who was on an Island in Whulge, modern-day Puget Sound. But Komo Kulshan was worried as the Island was far away and there was no clear path from their tribe to her mother, only mountains and trees. Determined to see her mother, Whaht-kway told her husband that he would have to create a way for her to travel, and so he did. Calling on all the animals with digging paws, he asked them to dig a long deep ditch. And so with ease, bears, beavers, marmots, cougars, rats, moles, and mice all got to work digging a ditch to the Island. After they finished, Komo Kulshan moved the water from the mountains to fill the hole creating a path said to be wide enough for two canoes. Today the river is called the Nooksack River.

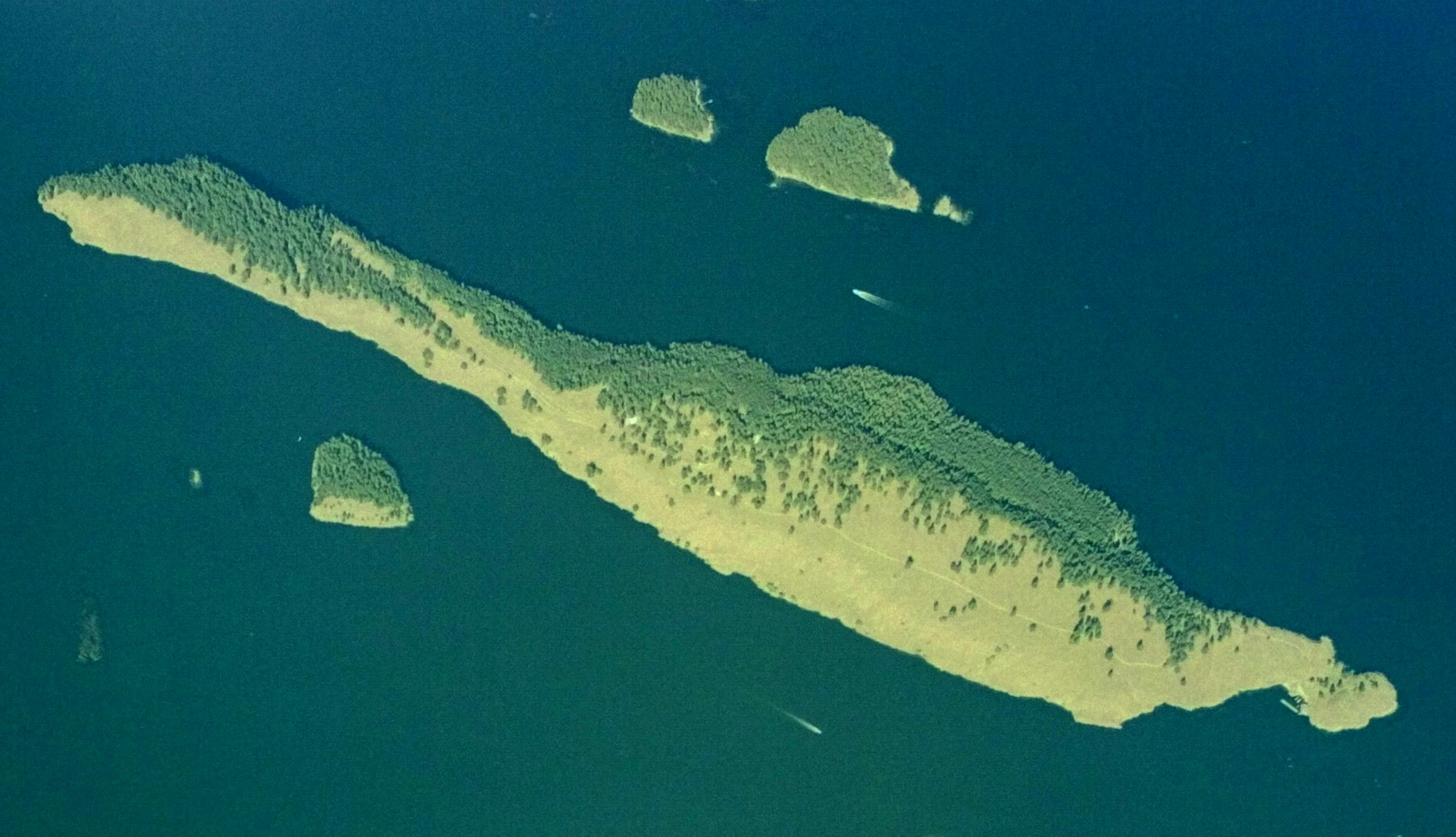
Spieden Island and Sentinel Island from a birds-eye view

Filling her canoe with different types of foods, Whaht-kway took off down the river. She eventually stopped at an island to eat the mussels she brought, leaving some there before continuing. She then did the same on another, eating and leaving Camas behind her. And again, on each Island she passed, leaving every type of food she brought with her. Now, each of the islands that she visited is named after the type of food that can be found left behind by Whaht-kway. Finally, Whaht-kway made it to an island called Flat Top Island in Whulge. There she stayed laying down to become what is known as Spieden Island. When her child was born, it became a smaller island of a similar shape known today as Sentinel Island.

== Komo Kulshan, his children, and the creation of Mount Baker ==
Sometime after, Komo Kulshan began to miss his wives so he decided to pack up his things with his children and leave so that he could be closer to both Whaht-kway and Duh-hwahk. Stretching himself so he could see them, Komo Kulshan became almost as tall as Duh-hwahk and is now known as Mount Baker. Copying their father, his children also grew up to the sky and are said to have become what is known as Twin Sisters Mountain.
