= USS Panuco =

Cargo ship of the United States Navy

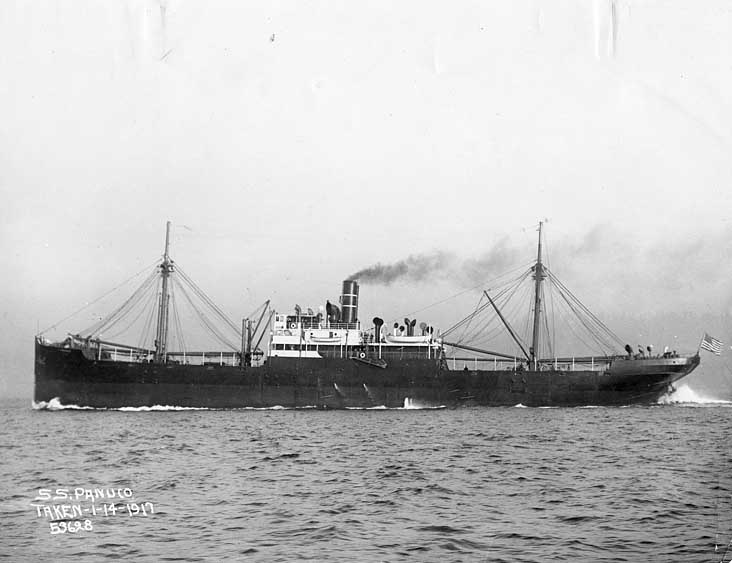
- SS Panuco in commercial service on 14 January 1917, around the time of her completion.

History

United States
- Name: USS Panuco
- Namesake: Previous name retained
- Builder: Seattle Construction and Drydock Company, Seattle, Washington
- Launched: 21 October 1916
- Completed: January 1917
- Acquired: 13 September 1918
- Commissioned: 13 September 1918
- Decommissioned: 28 April 1919
- Fate: Transferred to United States Shipping Board 28 April 1919; Returned to owner 28 April 1919
- Notes: In commercial service as SS Panuco 1917-1918 and 1919-1941; Destroyed by fire 18 August 1941

General characteristics
- Type: Cargo ship
- Tonnage: 3,832 Gross register tons
- Displacement: 8,060 tons
- Length: 351 ft 5 in (107.11 m)
- Beam: 47 ft 11 in (14.61 m)
- Draft: 22 ft 6 in (6.86 m) (mean)
- Propulsion: Steam engine
- Speed: 14 knots
- Complement: 70

USS Panuco (ID-1533) was a United States Navy cargo ship in commission from 1918 to 1919.

== Construction, acquisition, and commissioning ==
SS Panuco was completed as a commercial cargo ship in January 1917 at Seattle, Washington, by the Seattle Construction and Drydock Company for the New York and Cuba Mail Steamship Company of New York City. The U.S. Navy's 3rd Naval District inspected her in 1917 for possible naval service, and the Navy acquired her from her owner under a bareboat charter on 13 September 1918 for use during World War I. She was assigned the naval registry Identification Number (Id. No.) 1533 and commissioned as USS Panuco the same day at New York City.

== United States Navy career ==
Assigned to the Naval Overseas Transportation Service, Panuco was placed on the United States Army account and departed New York City carrying U.S. Army general cargo on 26 September 1918, arriving at Nantes, France, on 16 October 1918. After discharging her cargo at Nantes, she returned to New York City in ballast in November 1918.

On 23 December 1918, Panuco was placed on the United States Shipping Board account, under which she moved to New Orleans, Louisiana, loaded a cargo, and departed on 22 January 1919. She arrived at Montevideo, Uruguay, in February. After discharging her cargo there, she moved to Ramallo, Argentina, where she loaded a cargo of linseed cake and departed for New York City, where she arrived on 19 April 1919.

Panuco was decommissioned on 28 April 1919 and transferred to the U.S. Shipping Board the same day for simultaneous return to the New York and Cuba Mail Steamship Company.

== Later career ==
Once again SS Panuco, the ship resumed commercial service. She was still operating for the New York and Cuba firm when she was destroyed by fire while pierside at New York City on 18 August 1941.
