= Pánuco =

Pánuco may refer to the following places in Mexico:

- Pánuco (province)
- Pánuco, Veracruz
  - Pánuco Municipality, Veracruz
- Pánuco, Zacatecas
- Pánuco de Coronado Municipality, Durango
- Pánuco River
