= USS Bridgeport (AD-10) =

United States destroyer tender

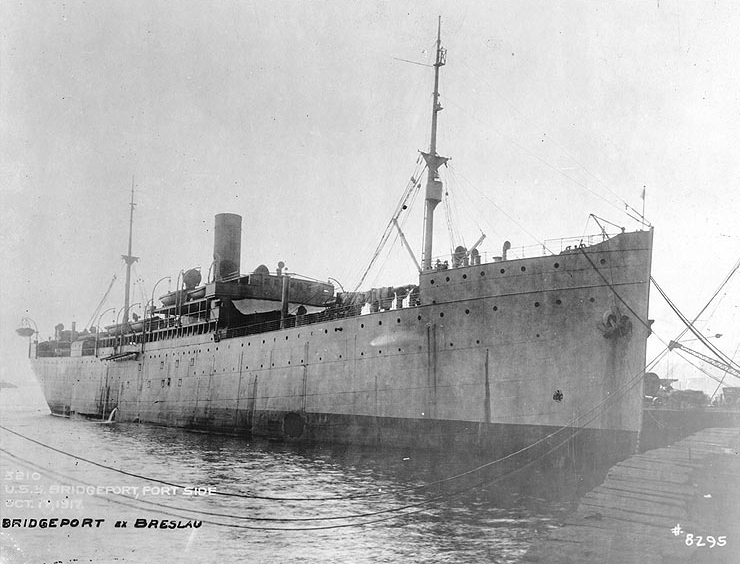
- USS Bridgeport (Id. No. 3009) at New York on 1 October 1917. She was originally the German liner SS Breslau.

History

Germany
- Name: SS Breslau
- Namesake: Breslau, Germany (today Wrocław, Poland)
- Owner: North German Lloyd
- Builder: Bremer Vulkan; Vegesack, Germany
- Laid down: 1901
- Launched: 14 August 1901
- Maiden voyage: 23 November 1901 to New York
- Route: Bremen–Baltimore, April 1902; Bremen–Baltimore–Galveston, September 1903; Bremen–Philadelphia, March 1910; Bremen–Boston–New Orleans, May 1914
- Captured: Interned at New Orleans, summer 1914; Seized by the United States, April 1917

United States
- Name: USS Bridgeport Repair Ship No. 2
- Namesake: Bridgeport, Connecticut
- Cost: $25,386 (refit costs)
- Acquired: Seized by the United States, April 1917
- Commissioned: 25 August 1917
- Refit: Boston Navy Yard, September 1917 – March 1918
- Reclassified: Destroyer Tender No. 10, 1 March 1918
- Reclassified: AD-10, 17 July 1920
- Decommissioned: 3 November 1924
- Stricken: 2 October 1941

United States
- In service: September 1943
- Renamed: USAHS Larkspur, September 1943
- Refit: Merrill-Stevens Drydock & Repair Co., Jacksonville, Florida, September 1943 – August 1944
- Renamed: USAT Bridgeport, January 1946
- Refit: Todd Shipyard, Hoboken, New Jersey, January 1946
- Out of service: 16 April 1947
- Fate: Scrapped 1948

General characteristics
- Class & type: Köln class
- Tonnage: 7,524 tons
- Length: 136.36 m (447 ft 5 in)
- Beam: 16.46 m (54 ft)
- Propulsion: 2 quadruple expansion steam engines, 3,600 hp (2,700 kW), twin screws
- Speed: 12 knots (22 km/h; 14 mph)
- Capacity: 60 cabin-class passengers, 1,660 steerage passengers
- Crew: 94–120

Differences as USS Bridgeport:
- Displacement: 8,600 tons
- Length: 447 ft 7.5 in (136.436 m)
- Beam: 54 ft 4 in (16.56 m)
- Draft: 29 ft 2 in (8.89 m)
- Speed: 12.5 knots (23 km/h; 14 mph)
- Complement: 786
- Armament: 1917: 4 × 3-inch (76 mm) guns; 1918: 8 × 5-inch (127 mm)/40-caliber guns; 2 × machine guns; 1920: 8 × 5-inch 51-caliber guns; 2 × machine guns

Differences as USAHS Larkspur:
- Tonnage: 7,995 tons
- Length: 447 ft 0 in (136.25 m)
- Draft: 29 ft 2 in (8.89 m)
- Speed: 10 knots (19 km/h; 12 mph)
- Range: 9,300 nmi (17,200 km; 10,700 mi)
- Capacity: 594 patients
- Armament: None

Differences as USAT Bridgeport:
- Draft: 29 ft 0 in (8.84 m)
- Range: 9,000 nmi (17,000 km; 10,000 mi)
- Capacity: 352 adults, 182 children

USS Bridgeport (AD-10/ID-3009) was a destroyer tender in the United States Navy during World War I and the years after. She was a twin-screw, steel-hulled passenger and cargo steamship built in 1901 at Vegesack, Germany as SS Breslau of the North German Lloyd line. Breslau was one of the seven ships of the Köln class of ships built for the Bremen to Baltimore and Galveston route.

Interned at New Orleans, Louisiana at the outbreak of World War I, Breslau was seized in 1917 by the United States after her entry into the war and commissioned into the Navy as USS Bridgeport. Originally slated to be a repair ship, she was reclassified as a destroyer tender the following year. Bridgeport completed several transatlantic convoy crossings before she was stationed at Brest, France, where she remained in a support role after the end of World War I. After returning to the United States in November 1919, she spent the next five years along the East Coast and in the Caribbean tending destroyers and conducting training missions. She was decommissioned in November 1924 and placed in reserve at the Boston Navy Yard.

After being struck from the Naval Vessel Register in October 1941, and a brief, unsuccessful attempt at merchant service early in World War II, she was transferred to the War Department for use by the United States Army in November 1942. The ship was selected for employment as a Hague Convention hospital ship and renamed USAHS Larkspur. She made three round trips to the United Kingdom before an extended tour of duty in the Mediterranean.

In January 1946, she was converted into transport ship USAT Bridgeport, destined for returning war brides and other military dependents from overseas. She continued in this role until laid up in the Reserve Fleet at Brunswick, Georgia, in 1947. Bridgeport was sold as surplus in February 1948 and broken up for scrap later that year at Mobile, Alabama.

== SS Breslau ==
Breslau was built in 1901 by the Bremer Vulkan yard at Vegesack for the North German Lloyd line as the fourth of seven ships of the Köln class. The Köln-class ships, all named after German cities, were designed for the Bremen to Baltimore and Galveston route, and were specially fitted for steerage traffic. Though the class was designed with accommodations for 120 cabin-class passengers and up to 1,850 steerage passengers for service from Germany, Breslau's capacity was somewhat lower, with room for 66 cabin-class and 1,660 in steerage. The Köln-class steerage compartments had portholes for better light and ventilation than was typical, and included cabins that housed from four to ten passengers. Köln-class ships were specially designed to carry large freight loads on return voyages to Germany, with holds customized for carrying wheat and cotton.

Breslau was a 7,524-ton steel-hulled vessel built with twin quadruple expansion steam engines that generated 3,600 horsepower (2,685 kW) and drove twin screws that moved the ship at a 12-knot (22 km/h; 14 mph) pace. Her length as built was 136.36 meters (447 ft 5 in) with a beam of 16.46 meters (54 ft). She had a single funnel, two masts, was outfitted with an awning deck, and was staffed by 94 to 120 crew members, depending upon the route and season.

After launching on 14 August 1901, Breslau sailed to New York on her maiden voyage on 23 November of that same year. In April 1902, she sailed on the Bremen to Baltimore route for the first time, and in September 1903, added Galveston to her itinerary. In March 1910, the liner was moved to the Bremen–Philadelphia run.

On 20 July 1913, while making an intermediate stop in Hoboken, New Jersey, Breslau was being warped into position when an electrical fire broke out at the pier where she was docking. Breslau made an emergency departure into the Hudson River, during which time the blaze was extinguished. The ship was not damaged and none of the 1,500 passengers aboard were injured in the incident. The ship left for Philadelphia on schedule the next day.

In May 1914, Breslau was shifted to a Bremen to Boston and New Orleans run. She left Bremen on 8 July 1914 for what turned out to be her last voyage for North German Lloyd. She landed at New York on 24 July after stops at Emden and Boston. After continuing on to New Orleans, Breslau was interned there after the German Empire had declared war, entering World War I.

== World War I ==
"Upon the entrance of the United States into World War I, customs officials seized Breslau, but not before her German crew had wrought considerable damage to her machinery. She was assigned Identification Number (Id. No.) 3009, renamed Bridgeport on 9 June 1917, and commissioned on 25 August 1917. Originally intended to be a repair ship, Bridgeport was reclassified as a destroyer tender (AD-10) on 1 March 1918 while under repair in the Boston Navy Yard between 13 September 1917 and 9 March 1918. "During this time, eight 5-inch guns and two machine guns replaced her original battery of four 3-inch (76 mm) guns."

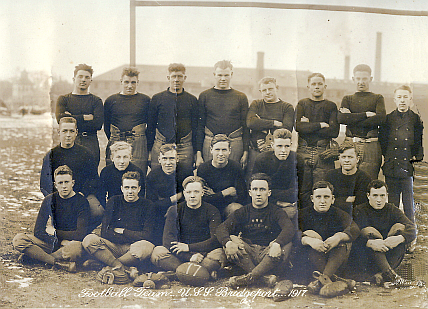

On 15 April, Bridgeport departed New York for the Azores in company with thirty 110-foot (34 m) submarine chasers that formed the convoy; four U.S. Navy and two French tugs were included to provide towing assistance if needed, while Salem and the armed yacht Wadena provided an escort; Bridgeport and the replenishment oiler Arethusa were included to provide support. "The British submarine HMS H-14 rounded out the group and gave it a truly Allied character." "Not long out of port, however, a collision reduced the numbers by two when H-14 collided with Arethusa, necessitating the former's return to Bermuda at the end of a towline astern of tug Conestoga on 18 April. That same day, Bridgeport coaled tug Montcalm while underway; on 19 April, she towed the ailing Bagaduce, and, as necessary, the submarine chaser SC-255 on 24 April and SC-142 on the day following, proving her versatility."

Reaching Ponta Delgada on the afternoon of 27 April, Bridgeport spent the remainder of April and the first two weeks of May in the Azores. Her log reflects the multi-faceted work of a ship of her type, one that was becoming increasingly important as the U.S. Navy expanded to meet the challenge imposed by a World War. Reflecting the true allied nature of her calling, Bridgeport sent repair parties to several ships three days after her arrival, 30 April, ranging from the American armed yacht Wadena and submarine chaser SC-277 to the Italian steamship Virginia and the French tug Rene. She fitted out her no. 2 motor launch to patrol the anchorage on 11 May, arming it with a machine gun and a depth charge, and two days later issued 100 depth charges to Marietta. Underway on the morning of 14 May on the first leg of her homeward voyage, Bridgeport paused briefly at Grassy Bay from 21 to 26 May, and after picking up tug Conestoga and minesweeper Lykens on 26 May, ultimately reached New London on 29 May.

Early in June, Bridgeport made a round-trip voyage to Hampton Roads, Virginia, arriving back at New London on 23 June. She took on cargo and got underway on 28 June in a convoy of 18 subchasers and other vessels, bound for Europe by way of Bermuda and the Azores. Throughout the crossing, Bridgeport provided medical assistance and repair work as required.

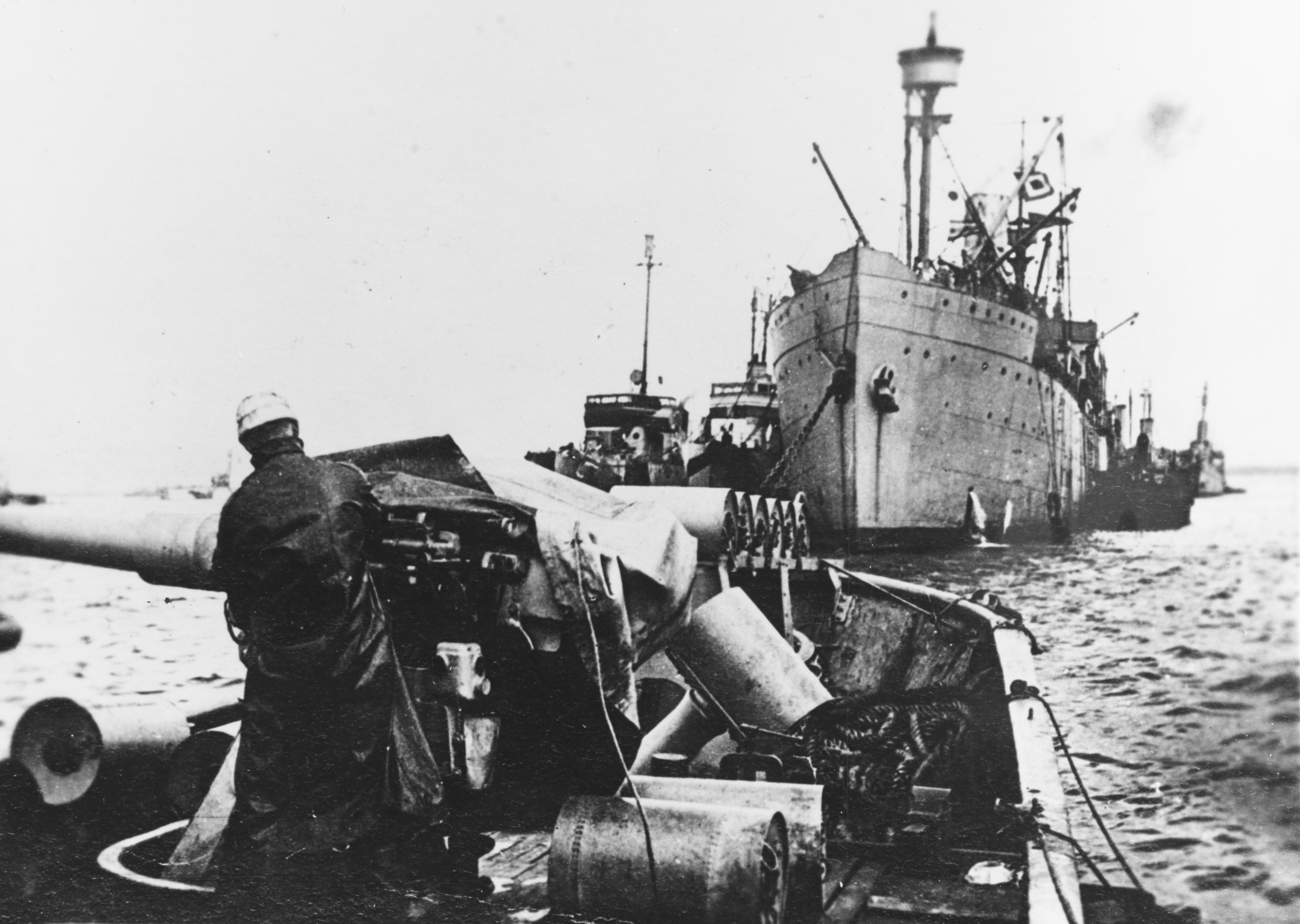
A view of USS Bridgeport at Brest in 1918, taken from Rambler

At 05:13 on 5 August, Bridgeport's lookouts spotted Ushant Light. At 06:40, SC-48 sighted a torpedo and sounded a warning. Two minutes later, men on board the tender saw the torpedo wake on Bridgeport's port quarter. Orders came down for full left rudder and full speed ahead. Bridgeport swung barely out of harm's way as men on her stern observed the torpedo disappear on the port side and reappear to starboard. It passed five feet astern, barely clearing the rudder. The starboard battery fired one shot in the direction of the torpedo—which broached on the starboard quarter—while the port guns fired in the direction from which the torpedo had come. Meanwhile, two destroyers, with a number of subchasers, hurried toward the spot where the torpedo wake had apparently begun and dropped depth charges. Bridgeport ceased fire and resumed her place in the formation. Through all this activity, no one actually saw the submarine that had fired the torpedo.

Bridgeport's lookouts later spied what looked like a submarine periscope some 2,000 yards (1,800 m) distant on the starboard bow. Putting on full right rudder, the ship commenced firing with her starboard battery while four subchasers hurried to the spot. She fired 22 rounds, but apparently to no avail. Bridgeport and her consorts reached Brest shortly afterward.

Designated the "parent ship" for destroyers based there, Bridgeport remained at Brest through the armistice and into the autumn of 1919. Bridgeport was the third such ship sent to French waters, and her arrival in August 1918 freed Panther to attend to urgent repair work in the Gironde River. Bridgeport and Prometheus not only maintained the various types of patrol craft operating with the patrol force but also supported troop transports and cargo vessels arriving in France.

== Interwar period ==
After the end of hostilities, Bridgeport joined in the salute to President Woodrow Wilson when he arrived at Brest on 13 December 1918 on board the transport George Washington.

Underway for England on the afternoon of 15 October 1919, Bridgeport arrived at Portland the following day and remained there until she sailed for New York on 26 October. En route to the United States on 3 November, the destroyer tender spotted the American merchant steamer SS Avondale with her engineering plant disabled, and sent over a repair party. Various machinery components were repaired in the tender's shops as Bridgeport's boat shuttled between the two ships carrying parts and workmen. By the following afternoon, Avondale was able to proceed under her own power, and the two ships parted company. Bridgeport reached the New York Navy Yard on 11 November and remained there into 1920.

Attached to Destroyer Squadron 3, Flotilla 2, Destroyer Force, Atlantic Fleet, Bridgeport departed New York on 6 February for Guantanamo Bay, where the fleet concentrated for winter maneuvers. Underway for Kingston, Jamaica, on 17 February, she remained there until 24 February. During the destroyer force's departure from Kingston, Dixie ran aground. Bridgeport stood in to assist her and succeeded in working Dixie out of her predicament. They reached Guantanamo Bay on 26 February. A month later, Bridgeport helped another grounded ship. She left Guantanamo Bay on 26 March bound for Guacanayabo near Manzanillo. On 27 March, the destroyer tender encountered the British merchantman SS Crostafels that had run aground off Ceiba Bank and set about to assist her in getting off the bank. Schenck joined in the effort not long thereafter, and together the two American warships had Crostafels afloat again.

After visiting Guacanayabo and Cienfuegos late in March and early in April, Bridgeport moved to Manzanillo and remained nearby until setting sail for New York on 24 April. She arrived at New York on 30 April for several days of upkeep and liberty before moving on to her summer base. On 17 May, she sailed for Newport, Rhode Island, the summer base for the destroyer squadrons, and arrived there the following day to tend the destroyers of Flotilla 2.

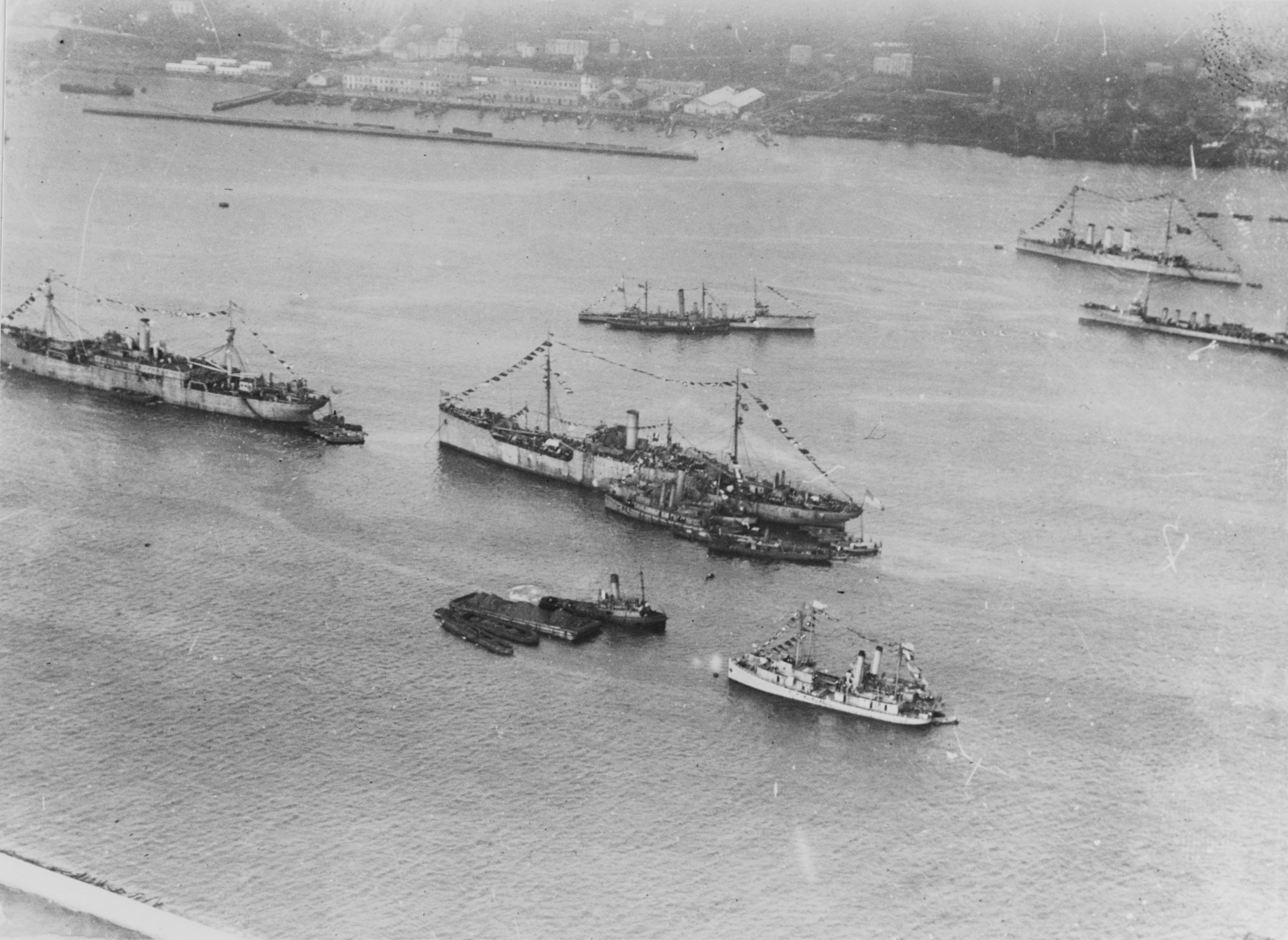
USS Bridgeport (far left) is among the ships greeting the arrival of President Woodrow Wilson in Brest.

Departing Newport on 31 May, Bridgeport arrived at the Boston Navy Yard the next day and remained there through July, undergoing repairs and alterations. During this refit, on 17 July 1920, she received the designation AD-10 when the Navy adopted the alphanumeric system of hull classification and identification. Her battery underwent its third change when her 5-inch (127 mm) guns were upgraded from the 40-caliber to the 51-caliber model. Bridgeport remained in the yard until 20 August, when she returned to Newport. Back at New York at the end of the month, Bridgeport received orders to join in the rescue effort for submarine S-5 that had sunk off the Delaware capes during post-overhaul trials. The destroyer tender left the anchorage off Tompkinsville late on 2 September and reached the scene late the following morning. Bridgeport remained in the vicinity until late the next day when she headed back to New York to reembark some of her crewmen left behind as a result of her hasty departure.

Bridgeport sailed for Charleston on 8 September, and reached that port on 14 September to serve the destroyers based there. The ship remained at Charleston into the early part of May 1921 when she sailed for New York, accompanying the fleet's destroyers northward to the Narragansett Bay operating areas. After a visit to New York City from 14 to 31 May 1921, Bridgeport arrived at Newport on 1 June and remained there, tending destroyers, into late September. She then spent the first half of October at the New York Navy Yard. Returning to Charleston on 15 October, Bridgeport worked there into late December, when she returned to the New York Navy Yard for the rest of 1921.

The year 1922 found Bridgeport continuing her service on the East Coast, mostly between Narragansett Bay and Hampton Roads, tending destroyers and assisting in destroyer target practices on the Southern Drill Grounds off the Virginia Capes. She visited the city for which she was named, Bridgeport, Connecticut, between 25 and 30 October. After a busy year's operations, she arrived at the Boston Navy Yard on 21 November 1922 and remained there into January 1923.

Later that month, Bridgeport returned to Cuban waters, and served as reference vessel for torpedo-firing exercises off Manzanillo early in February. After that mission, she transited the Panama Canal on 13 February to take part in Fleet Problem I as a "radio-relay vessel." That assignment occupied her through 21 February, and she entered Panama Bay on 23 February. She lay anchored there through the end of March and was among the ships reviewed by Admiral Robert E. Coontz, the Chief of Naval Operations, and the Honorable Edwin C. Denby, the Secretary of the Navy, who were embarked in the transport Henderson at the time. Retransiting the canal on 26 March, Bridgeport returned to Guantanamo Bay on 30 March and then headed northward, returning to Newport on 26 April.

From Narragansett Bay, Bridgeport returned to the Boston Navy Yard for post-deployment upkeep; while moored there, the ship conducted observances that followed the death of President Warren G. Harding on 2 August. Her officers and men assembled on the boat deck, aft, and after the ship's band had played two hymns—"Lead, Kindly Light," and "Nearer, My God, to Thee"—observed a moment of silence before resuming their work.

For the rest of the year, Bridgeport supported the fleet's destroyer forces, interspersing her time at Hampton Roads and on the Southern Drill Grounds with visits to Bridgeport (25 to 28 October) and Baltimore (10 to 11 November). She reached the Philadelphia Navy Yard on 18 November, and remained there through the end of 1923. Underway south on 3 January 1924, Bridgeport paused briefly at Hampton Roads the next day before pushing on toward Panama. She arrived in Chiriquí Lagoon, Panama on 12 January and participated in a search for a lost seaplane from Langley. While there, the destroyer tender also changed the starboard propeller of Childs.

Standing out of Bahía Limón, Panama on 25 January, Bridgeport visited Culebra, Puerto Rico, and Kingston, Jamaica, before she served as a reference vessel for torpedo practices being conducted by destroyers off Culebra. She departed Kingston late in April and steamed via Guantanamo Bay to New York. Returning to the Southern Drill Grounds on 20 May, the tender transferred five motor sailors and two motor whaleboats to the minesweeper Vireo, for use as tows and umpire boats for the torpedo practices fired by Putnam, Bruce, and Case. Bridgeport supported the destroyers' evolutions through mid-June.

The ship visited New York from 20 to 29 June before continuing on to Boston. She reached the Boston Navy Yard on 30 June and was decommissioned there one hour into the afternoon watch on 3 November 1924. Bridgeport remained inactive for almost two decades.

== World War II ==
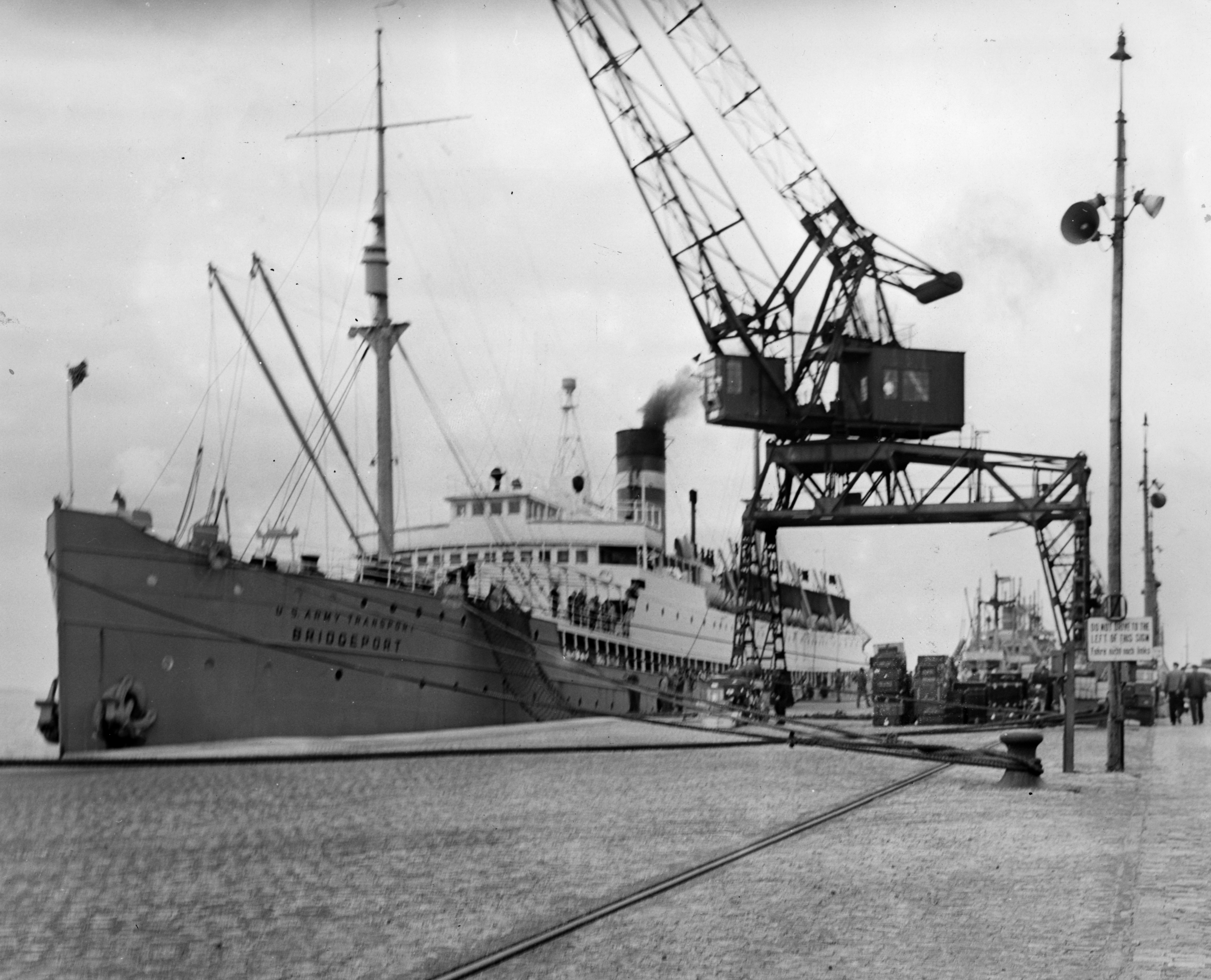
USAT Bridgeport in port, c. 1946

Bridgeport was struck from the Navy List on 2 October 1941, and she was acquired by the Bridgeport Steamship Co. on 2 February 1942 for conversion to merchant service. She proved unsuitable for service as a cargo carrier, and was returned to the government a few months later, when the War Shipping Administration (WSA) took her over on 29 June 1942. The WSA transferred the ship to the War Department in November 1942.

Surveyed and found suitable for conversion to a hospital ship, Bridgeport underwent modernization at the Merrill-Stevens Drydock & Repair Co. in Jacksonville, Florida from September 1943 to August 1944, during which time she was renamed USAHS Larkspur. Her maiden voyage as an Army hospital ship took her from Charleston, South Carolina to the British Isles. After visits to the River Clyde and to Belfast, Northern Ireland, she underwent repairs at Newport, Wales, before sailing for home. The ship reached Charleston on 16 October 1944 with her first group of patients.

Larkspur conducted two more voyages to England before she sailed for the Mediterranean where she operated for several months, visiting Oran, Algeria; Marseille, France; and Naples, Italy, among other ports. She then returned to Atlantic waters before being selected for conversion to an Army transport in January 1946. Reclassified as a United States Army Transport (USAT) and resuming operation under her old name, USAT Bridgeport was reconfigured to carry war brides and other military dependents at the Todd Shipyard in Hoboken, New Jersey. She made several voyages between England and the United States in this capacity, operating well into 1947.

Bridgeport was delivered to the United States Maritime Commission (USMC) and entered the Reserve Fleet at Brunswick, Georgia on 16 April 1947. In November 1947, the ship was declared surplus by the WSA and stripped of all equipment and wire. Bridgeport was sold for scrapping on 13 February 1948 to the H. H. Buncher Co. of Pittsburgh, Pennsylvania, and withdrawn from USMC custody on 1 March 1948. She was dismantled at Mobile, Alabama later that same year.

== Awards ==
- World War I Victory Medal with "MOBILE BASE" clasp
- American Campaign Medal
- European-African-Middle Eastern Campaign Medal
- World War II Victory Medal
- Army of Occupation Medal with "GERMANY" clasp
