= USS Panther (1889) =

Tender of the United States Navy

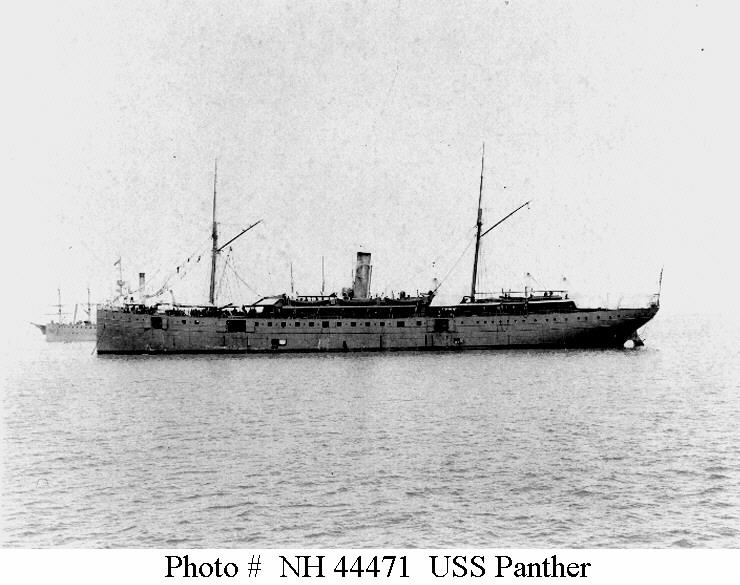
- USS "Panther"

History

United States
- Name: USS Panther
- Builder: William Cramp & Sons, Philadelphia
- Laid down: 1889 as SS Venezuela
- Acquired: by purchase, 12 April 1898
- Commissioned: 22 April 1898, as USS Panther
- Decommissioned: 20 October 1899
- Recommissioned: 19 June 1902
- Decommissioned: 21 October 1903
- Recommissioned: 8 November 1907
- Decommissioned: May 1922
- Reclassified: AD-6, 1920
- Fate: Sold, 24 March 1923

General characteristics
- Type: Auxiliary cruiser
- Displacement: 4,260 long tons (4,328 t)
- Length: 324 ft 4 in (98.86 m)
- Beam: 40 ft 6 in (12.34 m)
- Draft: 18 ft 2.5 in (5.550 m)
- Propulsion: Steam engine
- Speed: 13.5 knots (25.0 km/h; 15.5 mph)
- Armament: 6 × 5 in (130 mm) guns; 2 × 4 in (100 mm) guns; 6 × 3-pounder guns; 1 × Colt; 1 × 3 in (76 mm) howitzer

The first USS Panther (AD-6), the former SS Venezuela, was an auxiliary cruiser and naval troop transport in the United States Navy. Panther was designated AD-6 in 1920.

== Construction, acquisition, and commissioning ==
Panther was built by William Cramp & Sons, Philadelphia, in 1889. As SS Venezuela, a merchant steamship, she was used for several years as a cargo freighter transporting bananas from Central and South America. The U.S. Navy purchased Panther from the Red D Line Steamship Company on 12 April 1898, and commissioned her at New York on 22 April 1898, Commander George Cook Reiter in command.

== Service history ==
=== Spanish–American War, 1898–1899 ===
Panther was pressed into service immediately after commissioning on the outbreak of the Spanish–American War, and was hastily converted into a troop transport. On 27 April 1898 the ship took aboard the First Marine battalion commanded by Lieutenant Colonel Robert W. Huntington in preparation for combat operations in Cuba, sailing from Brooklyn, New York just five days later. As a converted 'banana boat', the Panther proved totally inadequate as a troop transport, and the morale of the Marines suffered in the tight and sweaty confines of the hastily converted ship as it steamed southward. As the Panther was unarmed, it was forced to stop at Hampton Roads, Virginia to obtain an armed escort before steaming to Key West, Florida, to await orders while the Marines disembarked for battalion drills, rifle practice, and route marches. The ship then joined the North Atlantic Fleet, portions of which blockaded Cuba throughout the conflict. Admiral William T. Sampson received word from Key West early in May that Spanish Admiral Pascual Cervera y Topete's squadron was very likely to sortie against U.S. naval forces at Santiago, Cuba. Panther and other ships of the American fleet patrolled off that port until she steamed to Guantánamo with a battalion of 633 enlisted Marines and 24 officers commanded by Lt. Col. Robert W. Huntington.

On 9–10 June 1898 the Panther disembarked the First Marine Battalion at Caimanera, Guantánamo Bay, Cuba in preparation for seizure of the harbor. During the landings, Commander Reiter of the Panther, who had continually argued over control of the Marine battalion while it was aboard ship, refused to permit the Marines to unload their small arms and artillery ammunition for their offensive, stating that he needed it for ship's ballast. He was overruled by another Navy Commander, Bowman H. McCalla, who instructed Reiter to give the Marine Lieutenant Colonel whatever he desired.

From 11 to 14 June 1898 the Marines engaged Spanish forces in the land battles of the Guantánamo Bay campaign. After a series of sharp engagements, the marines routed the 500 Spanish defenders, while suffering casualties of six killed and 16 wounded. The Panther then withdrew to her former position with the fleet in the successful campaign at Santiago. After the destruction of the Spanish fleet, Panther steamed to New York, to cruise between New York, Boston, Norfolk, and Portsmouth until 20 October 1899, when she went into ordinary at Philadelphia.

=== Caribbean Squadron, 1902–1903 ===
She remained in ordinary until recommissioning on 19 June 1902, when she fitted out as a training ship. In July, she steamed to New York to begin operations with various state militias. In this connection, she embarked crews from New Jersey in July, Pennsylvania in early August, and Connecticut later that month. In 1902, disturbing conditions in the West Indies and Caribbean required the constant presence of U.S. ships to maintain order and preserve U.S. treaty rights. In September 1902, Panther embarked a Marine battalion and departed for Caribbean waters to serve as a station ship to protect American interests during unrest in Honduras. She continued with the Caribbean Squadron until 21 October 1903, when she decommissioned at Philadelphia.

=== North Atlantic & Asiatic Station, 1907–1923 ===
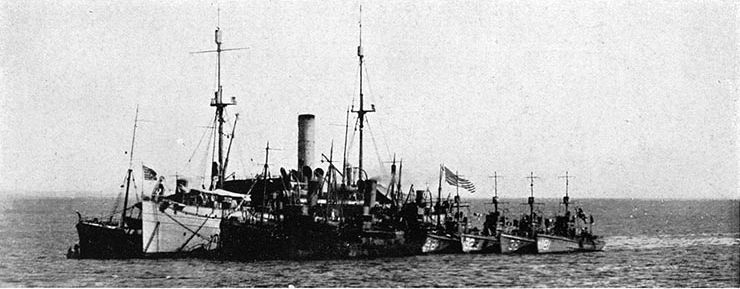
USS Panther moored in Kirkwall Harbor, Orkney Islands, with several trawlers and submarine chasers alongside, while supporting the North Sea Mine Barrage clearance operation in 1919.

Panther recommissioned on 18 November 1907 to serve as an auxiliary repair ship for the United States Atlantic Fleet until April 1917. She served as one of the auxiliary ships supporting the Great White Fleet's cruise around the world (16 December 1907 to 22 February 1909). She sailed for Brest on 1 July 1917 to serve as tender for the U.S. destroyer force during World War I.

After the war, her duties took her to ports such as Kirkwall, Scotland; Devonport, England; Lisbon, and Ponta Delgada. In 1921, American interest shifted to China; the Navy's Yangtze River Patrol had operated there for some years, guaranteeing the prevention of strife and the protection of persons and interests in the region. Panther joined the Asiatic Station's Yangtze River Patrol, where she patrolled on station until May 1922, when she returned stateside to decommission. She subsequently was sold to Tioga Steel Co., Philadelphia, 24 March 1923. She was broken up for scrap at Philadelphia in April 1923.

== Bibliography ==
- Eger, Christopher L. (March 2021). "Hudson Fulton Celebration, Part II". Warship International. LVIII (1): 58–81. ISSN 0043-0374.
