= USS Tillamook (AT-16) =

Tugboat of the United States Navy

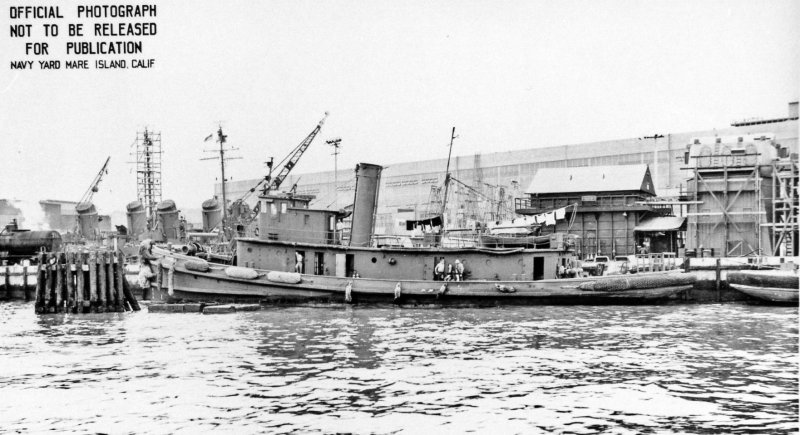
- USS Tillamook (YTM-122) at Mare Island Navy Yard in Vallejo, California 9 November 1945.

History

United States
- Name: USS Tillamook
- Namesake: The Tillamook, a large and prominent Coast Salish Native American tribe which occupied the shores of Tillamook Bay and its tributary rivers in northwestern Oregon
- Builder: Seattle Construction and Dry Dock Company, Seattle, Washington
- Laid down: 6 January 1914
- Launched: 15 August 1914
- In service: ca. August–September 1914
- Out of service: 28 April 1947
- Reclassified: From Tug No. 16 to fleet tug (AT-16) 17 July 1920; Harbor tug 31 January 1936; Medium harbor tug 13 April 1944
- Fate: Transferred to Maritime Commission for disposal 28 April 1947

General characteristics
- Type: Arapaho-class tugboat
- Displacement: 415 tons
- Length: 122 ft 6 in (37.34 m)
- Beam: 24 ft 0 in (7.32 m)
- Draft: 12 ft 10 in (3.91 m) mean
- Installed power: 800 shaft horsepower (1.1 megawatts)
- Propulsion: one 6x24x38 over 24 2 S.E. oil-burning steam engine, one shaft
- Speed: 10.5 knots
- Complement: 20
- Armament: 2 × 3-pounder guns

The first USS Tillamook (Tug No. 16), later AT-16, later YT-122, later YTM-122, was a United States Navy tug in service from 1914 to 1947.

Tillamook was laid down on 6 January 1914 by the Seattle Construction and Dry Dock Company at Seattle, Washington and launched on 15 August 1914. She was placed in service soon thereafter, probably later in August or in September 1914, as USS Tillamook (Tug No. 16).

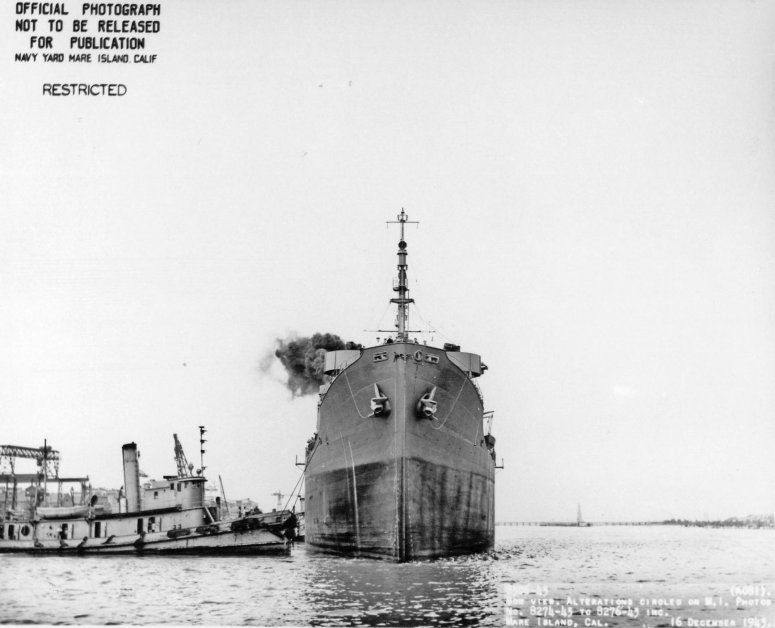
USS Tillamook (YT-122), left, assists USS Kennebago (AO-81) away from her berth at the Mare Island Navy Yard 16 December 1943.

Tillamook steamed south to San Francisco, California, and reported to the Commandant, 12th Naval District, for duty at Mare Island Navy Yard in Vallejo, California. She served her entire 33-year U.S. Navy career towing and assisting ships at Mare Island Navy Yard.

During her service, Tillamook changed designations three times. On 17 July 1920, when the Navy adopted the modern system of alpha-numeric hull designations, she was classified as a fleet tug and redesignated AT-16. On 31 January 1936, a number of old tugs previously classified as fleet tugs were reclassified as harbor tugs, and Tillamook became a harbor tug designated YT-122. She received her final classification, as a medium harbor tug, on 13 April 1944 and was redesignated YTM-122.

Tillamook was placed out of service and turned over to the Maritime Commission for disposal on 28 April 1947.
