= List of United States Navy ships: N–O =

Ships of the United States Navy

Ships in current service
- Current ships

Ships grouped alphabetically
- A–B; C; D–F; G–H; I–K; L; M; N–O; P; Q–R; S; T–V; W–Z

Ships grouped by type
- Aircraft carriers; Airships; Amphibious warfare ships; Auxiliaries; Battlecruisers; Battleships; Cruisers; Destroyers; Destroyer escorts; Destroyer leaders; Escort carriers; Frigates; Hospital ships; Littoral combat ships; Mine warfare vessels; Monitors; Oilers; Patrol vessels; Registered civilian vessels; Sailing frigates; Steam frigates; Steam gunboats; Ships of the line; Sloops of war; Submarines; Torpedo boats; Torpedo retrievers; Unclassified miscellaneous; Yard and district craft

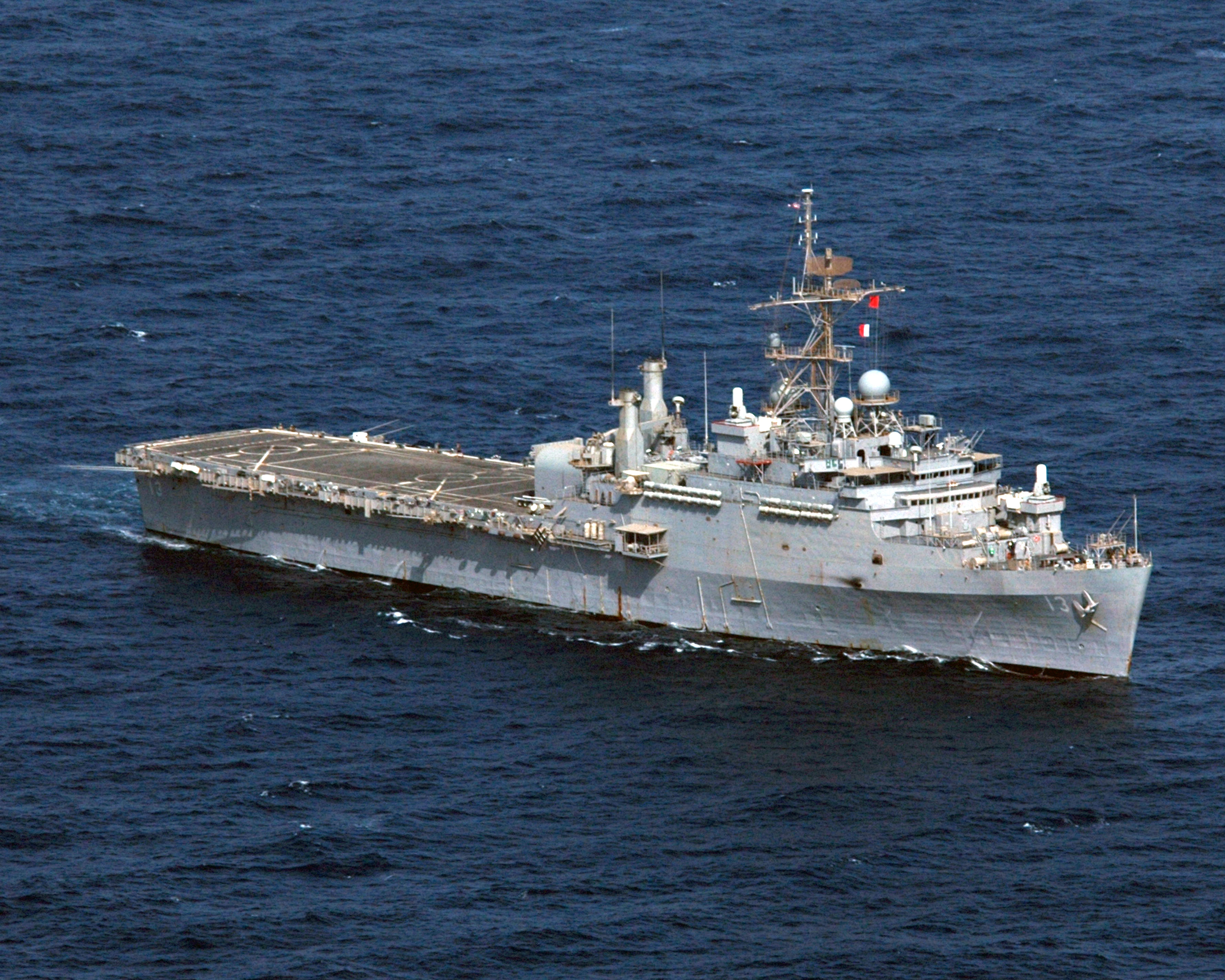
USS Nashville (LPD-13)

This section of the list of United States Navy ships contains all ships of the United States Navy with names beginning with N and O.

For a list exclusively of currently commissioned ships, see the List of current ships of the United States Navy.

For ships with unique names, "USS Ship‍name" redirects to the ship article. For reused names, "USS Ship‍name" is an index page for the ships of that name; the links after the name lead to the specific ship pages.

== N ==
- USS N-1 (SS-53)
- USS N-2 (SS-54)
- USS N-3 (SS-55)
- USS N-4 (SS-56)
- USS N-5 (SS-57)
- USS N-6 (SS-58)
- USS N-7 (SS-59)

=== Na ===
- USS Nabigwon (YTB-521/YTM-521)
- USS Nacheninga (YTB-520/YTM-520)
- USS Nadli (YTB-534/YTM-534)
- USS Nahant (1862, SP-1250, YN-102/AN-83)
- USS Nahasho (YTB-535/YTM-535)
- USS Nahma (YFB-1, SP-771)
- USS Nahoke (YTB-536/YTM-536)
- USS Nahunta (1872)
- USS Naiad (1863)
- USS Naifeh (DE-352)
- USS Naiwa (SP-3512)
- USS Najelda (SP-277)
- USS Nakarna (YTB-393/YTM-393)
- USS Namakagon (AOG-53)
- USS Namequa (YT-331/YTB-331)
- USS Namontack (YN-46/YNT-14/YTB-738)
- USS Nanigo (YTB-537/YTM-537)
- USS Nansemond (1862, 1896)
- USS Nansemond County (LST-1064)
- USS Nanshan (AG-3)
- USS Nantahala (ID-3519, AO-60)
- USS Nantasket (1867)
- USS Nanticoke (AOG-66, YTB-803)
- USS Nantucket (1862, 1907, PG-23/IX-18, SP-1153, LCS-27)
- USS Naos (AK-105)
- USS Napa (1862, AT-32, APA-157/LPA-157)
- USS Narada (SP-161)
- USS Narcissus (1863, WAGL-238)
- USS Narkeeta (1891, YT-3, YT-133/YTM-133)
- USS Narragansett (1859, SP-2196, SP-1163/YFB-1163, AT-88/ATF-88, T-ATF-167, T-ATS-14)
- USS Narraguagas (AOG-32)
- USS Narwhal (SS-17, SS-167, SSN-671)
- USS Nashawena (AG-142/YAG-35)
- USS Nashel (YTB-538)
- USS Nashira (AK-85)
- USS Nashua (YTB-774)
- USS Nashville (PG-7, CL-43, LPD-13)
- USS Nasomsee (YT-260/YTB-260)
- USS Nassau (AVG-16/ACV-16/CVE-16/CVHE-16, LHA-4)
- USS Nassuk Bay (ACV-67/CVE-67)
- USS Natahki (YTB-398/YTM-398)
- USS Natalia (SP-1251)
- USS Natalie Mae (SP-1005)
- USS Natchaug (AOG-54)
- USS Natchez (1827, PG-85, PG-102/PF-2)
- USS Natchitoches (YTB-799)
- USS Nathan Hale (SSBN-623)
- USS Nathanael Greene (SSBN-636)
- USS Nathaniel Taylor (1863)
- USS Natick (SP-570, YTB-760)
- USS National Guard (1857)
- USS Natoma (SP-666)
- USS Natoma Bay (AVG-62/ACV-62/CVE-62/CVU-62)
- USS Natoya (SP-396)
- USS Natrona (APA-214)
- USS Naubuc (1864, YN-109/AN-84/YRST-4)
- USS Naugatuck (1862, WYT-92, YTM-753)
- USS Naumkeag (1863)
- USS Nauset (AT-89/ATF-189)
- USS Nausett (1865, YT-35, IX-190, ACM-15/MMA-15)
- USS Naushon (SP-517)
- USS Nautilus (1799, 1847, SS-29, SS-168, SSN-571)
- USS Nautilus II (SP-559)
- USS Navajo (AT-52/IX-56, AT-64, ATA-211, T-ATF-169, T-ATS-6)
- USS Navajo III (SP-298)
- USS Navarro (APA-215/LPA-215)
- USS Navasota (AO-106/T-AO-106)
- USCGC Navesink (WYT-88)
- USS Navigator (SP-2225/YT-39/YTB-39, ATA-203)
- USS Navy Yard (YFB-8)
- USS Nawat (YN-55/YNT-23)
- USS Nawona (YT-261/YTB-261)

=== Ne ===
- USS Neal A. Scott (DE-769)
- USS Nebraska (1869, BB-14, SSBN-739)
- USS Neches (AO-5, AO-47, T-AO-183/T-AOT-183)
- USS Nedeva II (SP-64)
- USS Needle (SP-649)
- USS Needlefish (SS-379, SS-493)
- USS Negwagon (YT-188/YTB-188/YTM-188, YTB-834)
- USS Nehenta Bay (CVE-74/CVU-74/AKV-24)
- RV Neil Armstrong (T-AGOR-27)
- USS Nelansu (SP-610)
- USS Nellie (1876)
- USS Nellie Jackson (SP-1459)
- USS Nelson (DD-623)
- USCGC Nemaha (WSC-148)
- USS Nemasket (AOG-10)
- USS Nemes (SP-424)
- USS Nemesis (1869, SP-343, WPC-111)
- DSV Nemo
- USS Nemo
- USS Neodesha (YTB-815)
- USS Neoga (YT-263/YTB-263/YTM-263)
- USS Neokautah (YT-284/YTB-284)
- USS Neomonni (YT-349)
- USS Neosho (1863, AO-23, AO-48, AO-143/T-AO-143)
- USS Nepanet (YT-189/YTB-189/YTM-189)
- USS Nepenthe (SP-112)
- USS Neponset (ID-3581)
- USS Neptune (1863, 1869, AC-8, ARC-2/T-ARC-2)
- USS Nereus (1863, AC-10, AS-17)
- USS Nerita (SP-3028)
- USS Nerka (SS-380)
- USS Nero (AC-17)
- USS Neshaminy (1865)
- USS Neshanic (AO-71)
- USS Neshoba (APA-216)
- USS Nespelen (AOG-55)
- USS Nestor (ARB-6)
- USS Nesutan (YT-338/YTB-338)
- USS Neswage (YN-49/YNT-17)
- USS Nettie (SP-1436)
- USS Nettle (1814, 1862)
- USS Neuendorf (DE-200)
- USS Neunzer (DE-150)
- USS Nevada (BM-8, BB-36, SSBN-733)
- USS Neville (AP-16/APA-9)
- USS New (DD-818)
- USS New Bedford (PG-179/PF-71, T-AKL-17/IX-308)
- USS New Berne (1862)
- USS New England (1861, SP-1222, AS-28/AD-32)
- USS New Era (1862)
- USS New Hampshire (1864, BB-25, BB-70, SSN-778)
- USS New Hanover (AKA-73)
- USS New Haven (1776, CL-76, CL-109, CLK-2)
- USS New Ironsides (1862)
- USS New Jersey (BB-16, BB-62, SSN-796)
- USS New Kent (APA-217)
- USS New London (1859)
- USS New London County (LST-1066/T-LST-1066)
- USS New Mexico (BB-40, SSN-779)
- USS New National (1862)
- USS New Orleans (1815, PG-34/CL-22, CL-32/CA-32, LPH-11, LPD-18)
- USS New Uncle Sam (1862)
- USS New York (1776, 1800, 1820, 1869, ACR-2, BB-34, LPD-21)
- USS New York City (SSN-696)
- USS Newark (C-1, SP-266, CL-88, CL-100, CL-108)
- USS Newberry (APA-158)
- USS Newburgh (ID-1369)
- USS Newcastle Victory (AK-233)
- USS Newcomb (DD-586)
- USS Newell (DE-322/WDE-422/DER-322)
- USS Newman (DE-205/APD-59)
- USS Newman K. Perry (DD-883/DDR-883)
- USS Newport (PG-12/IX-19, PG-135/PF-27, LST-1179, T-EPF-12)
- USS Newport News (AK-3, CA-148, SSN-750)
- USS Newton (1901, ID-4306)
- USS Nezinscot (1898)

=== Ni ===
- USS Niagara (1813, 1855, 1898, SP-246, SP-263, SP-136/PY-9, CMc-2/PG-52/AGP-1, APA-87)
- USS Niagara Falls (AFS-3/T-AFS-3)
- USS Niantic (AVG-46/ACV-46/CVE-46, YTB-781)
- USS Niantic Victory (AGM-6)
- USS Niblack (DD-424)
- USS Nicholas (DD-311, DD-449/DDE-449, FFG-47)
- USS Nicholson (TB-29, DD-52, DD-442, DD-982)
- USS Nicollet (AK-199/AG-93/AVS-6)
- USS Nields (DD-616)
- USS Nightingale (1851, SP-523, AMc-18, AMc-149/IX-177, AMS-50/MSC(O)-50)
- USS Nihoa (YFB-17)
- USS Niji (SP-33)
- USCGC Nike (WPC-112)
- USS Nimble (AM-266, AM-459/MSO-459)
- USS Nimitz (CVN-68)
- USS Nina (1865)
- USS Niobe (1869)
- USS Niobrara (AO-72)
- USS Niphon (1863)
- USS Nipmuc (AT-157/ATF-157)
- USS Nipsic (1863)
- USS Nirvana (SP-706)
- USS Nirvana II (SP-204)
- USS Nita (1856)
- USS Nitro (AE-2, AE-23)
- USS Nitze (DDG-94)

=== No ===
- USS Noa (DD-343/APD-24, DD-841)
- USS Noble (1861, APA-218)
- MV Noble Star (AK-9653)
- USS Nodaway (AOG-67, T-AOG-78)
- USS Nogales (YTB-777)
- USS Noka (YN-54/YNT-22)
- USS Nokomis (SP-609/PY-6, YT-142/YTB-142/YTM-742)
- USS Noma (SP-131)
- USS Nomad (SP-1046)
- USS Nonata (1846)
- USS Nonpareil (SP-370/YT-40)
- USS Nonsuch (1813)
- USS Noord Brabant (1918)
- USS Nootka (YTB-508/YTM-771)
- USS Nopatin (SP-2195)
- USS Norfolk (1798, CA-137, DL-1, SSN-714, SSN-815)
- USS Norfolk Packet (1862)
- USS Norlina (ID-1597)
- USS Norma (AK-86)
- USS Norman Scott (DD-690)
- USS Normandy (CG-60)
- USS Normannia (SP-756)
- USS Norris (DD-859/DDE-859)
- USS North (YFB-46)
- USS North Carolina (1820, ACR-12, BB-52, BB-55, SSN-777)
- USS North Dakota (BB-29, SSN-784)
- USS North Pole (SP-3791)
- USCGC North Star (WPG-59)
- USS Northampton (SP-670, CL-26/CA-26, CA-125/CLC-1/CC-1)
- USNS Northern Light (T-AK-284)
- USS Northern Pacific (1917)
- USCGC Northland (WPG-49)
- USS Northwind (AGB-5)
- USS Norton Sound (AV-11/AVM-1)
- USNS Norwalk (T-AK-279)
- USS Norwich (1812, 1861)
- USS Notable (AM-267, AM-460/MSO-460)
- USS Nottoway (YT-18, ATA-183)
- USS Nourmahal (PG-72)
- USS Noxubee (AOG-56)

=== Nr–Ny ===
- USS NR-1 (NR-1)
- USS Nucleus (AM-268/MSF-268)
- USS Nueces (APB-40/IX-503)
- USS Numa (YTB-399/YTM-399)
- USS Numitor (ARL-17)
- USS Nuthatch (AM-60/MSF-60)
- USS Nutmeg (YN-28/AN-33)
- USS Nyack (1863, YT-19)
- USS Nyanza (1863)
- USS Nye County (LST-1067/T-LST-1067)
- USS Nymph (1863)

== O ==
- USS O'Bannon (DD-177, DD-450/DDE-450, DD-987)
- USS O'Brien (TB-30, DD-51, DD-415, DD-725, DD-975)
- USS O'Callahan (DE-1051/FF-1051)
- USS O'Flaherty (DE-340)
- USS O'Hare (DD-889/DDR-889)
- USS O'Kane (DDG-77)
- USS O'Neill (DE-188)
- USS O'Reilly (DE-330)
- USS O'Toole (DE-274, DE-527)
- USS O-1 (SS-62)
- USS O-2 (SS-63)
- USS O-3 (SS-64)
- USS O-4 (SS-65)
- USS O-5 (SS-66)
- USS O-6 (SS-67)
- USS O-7 (SS-68)
- USS O-8 (SS-69)
- USS O-9 (SS-70)
- USS O-10 (SS-71)
- USS O-11 (SS-72)
- USS O-12 (SS-73)
- USS O-13 (SS-74)
- USS O-14 (SS-75)
- USS O-15 (SS-76)
- USS O-16 (SS-77)
- USS O. H. Lee (1861)
- USS O. M. Pettit (1857)

=== Oa–Og ===
- USS Oahu (PG-46/PR-6, ARG-5)
- USS Oak Hill (APM-7/LSD-7, LSD-51)
- USS Oak Ridge (ARDM-1)
- USS Oakland (1918, CL-95/CLAA-95, LCS-24)
- USS Oberlin (PC-560)
- USS Oberon (AK-56/AKA-14/T-AKA-14/LKA-14)
- USS Oberrender (DE-344)
- USS Obispo (SS-382)
- USS Observation Island (E-AG-154/T-AGM-23)
- USS Observer (AMc-91, AM-461/MSO-461)
- USS Obstructor (ACM-7)
- USS Ocala (YTB-805)
- USS Oceanographer (OSS-26/AGS-3)
- USS Oceanside (LSM-175)
- USS Oceanus (ARB-2)
- USS Ocelot (IX-110)
- USS Ochlockonee (AOG-33)
- USS Ocklawaha (AO-84/T-AO-84)
- USS Ocmulgee (YTB-532)
- USS Ocoee (SP-1208)
- USS Oconee (AT-31, AOG-34)
- USS Oconostota (YT-375/YTB-375/YTM-375)
- USS Oconto (APA-187)
- USS Octans (AF-26)
- USS Octavia (AF-46)
- USS Octopus (SS-9)
- USS Octorara (1861, IX-139)
- USS Odax (SS-484)
- USS Odum (DE-670/APD-71)
- USS Ogden (PG-147/PF-39, LPD-5)
- USS Ogeechee (AOG-35)
- USS Oglala (CM-4/ARG-1)
- USS Oglethorpe (AKA-100)

=== Oh–On ===
- USS Ohio (1812, 1820, BB-12, BB-68, SSBN-726/SSGN-726)
- USS Ohioan (1914)
- USS Ojanco (SS-381)
- USS Ojen (SP-957)
- USS Okala (ARST-2)
- USS Okaloosa (APA-219)
- USS Okanogan (APA-220/LPA-220)
- USS Okinawa (CVE-127, LPH-3)
- USS Okisko (YN-42/YNT-10/YTL-735)
- USS Oklahoma (BB-37, SSN-802)
- USS Oklahoma City (CL-91/CLG-5/CG-5, SSN-723)
- USS Okmulgee (YTB-765)
- USS Olathe (YTM-273)
- USS Old Colony (SP-1254)
- USS Old Columbia (CA-16)
- USS Old Constitution (1797)
- USS Old Dominion (ID-3025)
- USS Oldendorf (DD-972)
- USS Oleander (1863, WAGL-264)
- USS Oliver H. Lee (1861)
- USS Oliver Hazard Perry (PFG-109/FFG-7)
- USS Oliver Mitchell (DE-417)
- USS Oliver Wolcott (1832)
- USS Olivin (PYc-22)
- USS Olmstead (APA-188/LPA-188)
- USS Olney (PC-1172)
- USS Olympia (C-6/CL-15/CA-15/IX-40, SSN-717)
- USS Olympic (SP-260)
- USS Omaha (1869, CL-4, SSN-692, LCS-12)
- USS Ommaney Bay (CVE-79)
- USCGC Onandago (1925)
- USS Ondina (1899)
- USS Oneida (1809, 1861, 1898, SP-765, APA-221)
- USS Oneka (YN-35/YNT-3/YTM-729)
- USS Oneonta (SP-1138)
- USS Oneota (1864, YN-110/AN-85)
- USS Oneyana (YT-262/YTB-262/YTM-262)
- USS Onkahye (1843)
- USS Ono (SP-128, SS-357)
- USS Onockatin (YT-277/YTB-277)
- USS Onondaga (1864, 1917, WPG-79)
- USS Onset (SP-1224)
- USS Onslow (AVP-48)
- USS Ontario (1812, 1813, AC-2, AT-13/ATO-13)
- USS Ontonagon (AOG-36/T-AOG-36)
- USS Onward (1852, SP-311)
- USS Onward II (SP-728)
- USS Onwego (PYc-48)
- USS Onyx (PYc-5)

=== Oo–Os ===
- USS Oosterdijk (ID-2586)
- USS Opal (PYc-8)
- USS Opelika (YTB-798)
- USS Ophir (ID–2800)
- USS Opponent (AM-269/MSF-269)
- USS Opportune (ARS-41)
- USS Ora (SP-75)
- USS Oracle (AM-103/MSF-103)
- USS Orange (PG-151/PF-43)
- USS Orange County (LST-1068)
- USS Oratamin (YT-347/YTB-347/YTM-347)
- USS Orca (SS-34, SP-726, SS-381, AVP-49)
- USCGC Orchid (WAGL-240)
- USS Ordronaux (DD-617)
- USS Oregon (1841, 1869, BB-3/IX-22, SSN-793)
- USS Oregon City (CA-122, CG-13)
- USS Oregonian (ID-1323)
- USS Orestes (AGP-10)
- USS Oriole (1864, 1895, 1904, AMCU-33/MHC-33, AM-7/AT-136/ATO-136, MHC-55)
- USS Orion (1869, AC-11, AS-18)
- USS Oriskany (CV-18, CV-34/CVA-34)
- USS Orizaba (ID-1536/AP-24)
- USS Orlando (PG-207/PF-99)
- USS Orleans Parish (LST-1069/MCS-6/T-LST-1069)
- USS Orleck (DD-886)
- USS Ormsby (AP-94/APA-49)
- USS Orono (YT-190/YTB-190/YTM-190)
- USS Ortolan (AM-45/ASR-5, AMCU-34/MHC-34, ASR-22)
- USS Orvetta (1861, IX-157)
- USS Osage (1863, AN-3/AP-108/LSV-3/MCS-3)
- USS Osamekin (YT-191/YTB-191)
- USS Osberg (DE-538)
- USS Osborne (DD-295)
- USS Oscar Austin (DDG-79)
- USS Osceola (1863, 1869, AT-47, YT-129/YTB-129/YTM-129)
- USS Oshkosh (YTB-757)
- USS Oskaloosa (1918)
- USS Oskawa (1919)
- USS Osmond Ingram (DD-255/AVD-9/APD-35)
- USS Osmus (DE-701)
- USS Osprey (AM-29, AM-56, AM-406, MHC-51, AMS-28/MSC(O)-28)
- USS Osprey II (SP-928)
- USS Ossahinta (YT-278/YTB-278)
- USS Ossipee (1861, WPG-50)
- USS Ostara (AKA-33)
- USS Osterhaus (DE-164)
- USS Ostfriesland (1909)
- USS Ostrich (SP-1249, AMc-51, AMS-29/MSC(O)-29)
- USS Oswald (DE-71, DE-767)
- USS Oswald A. Powers (DE-542)
- USS Oswegatchie (YTB-515/YTM-778)

=== Ot–Oz ===
- USS Otis W. Douglas (SP-313)
- USS Otokomi (YTB-400/YTM-400)
- USS Otsego (1840, 1864, 1869, 1919)
- USS Ottawa (1861, AKA-101)
- USS Otter (YFB-663, DE-210)
- USS Otterstetter (DE-244/DER-244)
- USS Ottumwa (YTB-761)
- USS Otus (AS-20/ARG-20)
- USS Ouachita (1863)
- USS Ouachita County (LST-1071)
- USS Ouellet (DE-1077/FF-1077)
- USS Outagamie County (LST-1073)
- USS Outpost (YAGR-10/AGR-10)
- USS Overseer (AM-321/MSF-321)
- USS Overton (DD-239/APD-23)
- USS Overton County (LST-1074)
- USS Owachomo (YTB-401/YTM-401)
- USS Owaissa (SP-659)
- USS Owasco (1861)
- USS Owatonna (YTM-756)
- USS Owen (DD-536)
- USS Owera (SP-167)
- USS Owl (AM-2/AT-137/ATO-137, AMCU-35/MHC-35)
- USS Owyhee River (LSM(R)-515/LFR-515)
- USS Oxford (APA-189, AG-159/AGTR-1)
- USS Oyster Bay (AVP-28/AGP-6)
- USS Ozama (1916)
- USS Ozark (1863, BM-7, CM-7/AP-107/LSV-2/MCS-2)
- USS Ozaukee (ID-3439)
- USS Ozbourn (DD-846)
- USS Ozette (ID-3985, YTB-541)
