= USS Narkeeta =

USS Narkeeta may refer to the following ships of the United States Navy:

- USS Narkeeta (1891) was a tug boat that served primarily in the New York area during the Spanish–American War and World War I.
- USS Narkeeta (YT–133) duties included tugging, towing, and firefighting, for the 11th Naval District, during World War II.
