= Samuel Gates =

Samuel or Sam Gates may refer to:

- Samuel Gates, character in List of Person of Interest episodes
- Samuel Gates (shipbuilder) of USS Ora (SP-75)
- Sam Gates, character in Spy for a Day
