= Naushon =

Naushon may refer to:

- Naushon Island, one of the Elizabeth Islands in Gosnold, Massachusetts
- USS Naushon (SP-517), a United States Navy patrol vessel in commission from 1918 to 1919
- USCGC Naushon (WPB-1311), a United States Coast Guard Island-class patrol boat
- SS Naushon (1957), a car ferry operating in Massachusetts from 1957 to 1987
