= Nantahala =

Nantahala may refer to:

- Nantahala Lake, a lake in Macon County, North Carolina, in the United States
- The Nantahala National Forest, a national forest in North Carolina in the United States
- The Nantahala Outdoor Center, a commercial outdoor guide service and retail store near Bryson City, North Carolina, in the United States
- The Nantahala River, a river in western North Carolina in the United States
- The Southern Nantahala Wilderness, a federally preserved wilderness area in Georgia and North Carolina in the United States
- USS Nantahala, the name of more than one United States Navy ship
