= Nahma =

Nahma may refer to:

Places:

- Nahma Township, Michigan, USA
  - Nahma, Michigan, an unincorporated community
- Nahma, Ontario, Canada

Ships named USS Nahma

- USS Nahma (YFB-1)
- USS Nahma (SP-771)
