= USS Noble =

USS Noble may refer to the following vessels operated by the United States Navy:

- USS Noble (1861), part of the Stone Fleet in 1862
- USS Noble (APA-218), acquired by the US Navy in 1944 and transferred to Spain in 1964
