= USS Ono =

USS Ono has been the name of more than one United States Navy ship, and may refer to:

- USS Ono (SP-128), a patrol boat in commission from 1917 to 1919
- USS Ono (SS-357), proposed submarine for which the construction contract was cancelled in 1944
