= USS Onward =

USS Onward and USS Onward II have been the name of more than one United States Navy ship, and may refer to:

- USS Onward (1852), a clipper ship in commission from 1862 to 1865 and again, as a store ship, from 1865 to 1884
- USS Onward (SP-311), a patrol vessel in commission from 1917 to 1919
- USS Onward II (SP-728), a patrol vessel in commission from 1917 to 1918
