= USS Naugatuck =

USS Naugatuck may refer to the following ships:

- USS Naugatuck (1844) the name incorrectly attributed to the U.S. Revenue Cutter E.A. Stevens (later renamed USRC Naugatuck), a semi-submersible armored gunboat employed by the Revenue Cutter Service 1861–1889
- USS Naugatuck (YTM–753), was a medium harbor tugboat taken over from the U.S. Army in 1963.

== See also ==
- USCGC Naugatuck (YN-88), was a U.S. Coast Guard patrol boat commissioned in June 1926.
- USCGC Naugatuck (WYT-92), was a U.S. Coast Guard harbor tug launched in March 1939.
