= USS Ostrich =

USS Ostrich is a name used more than once by the United States Navy, and may refer to:

- USS Ostrich (SP-1249), a patrol boat in commission from 1917 to 1918
- USS Ostrich (AMc-51), a coastal minesweeper in service from 1941 to 1945
- USS Ostrich (YMS-430), a minesweeper originally named USS YMS-430, in commission from 1944 to 1946 and again from 1946 to 1957, renamed USS Ostrich in 1947
