= USS Nemesis =

Ship name

USS Nemesis has been the name of more than one United States Navy ship, and may refer to:

- USS Napa (1864), a torpedo boat launched in 1864 but never commissioned, which was named USS Nemesis from June to August 1869 before resuming the name Napa
- USS Nemesis (SP-343), a patrol boat in commission from 1917 to 1918
- USCGC Nemesis (WPC-111), a United States Coast Guard cutter in commission from 1934 to 1964, which served in the U.S. Navy as USS Nemesis from 1941 to 1946
