= USS New Bedford =

USS New Bedford may refer to the following ships of the United States Navy:

- USS New Bedford (PF-71), was a Tacoma-class frigate launched in 1943 and sold for scrap in 1947
- USNS New Bedford, was originally the US Army freighter FS-289 and acquired by the US Navy in 1950; sold in 1996
