= USS Narragansett =

USS Narragansett may refer to the following ships operated by the United States Navy:

- USS Narragansett (1859), a Union sloop, launched in 1859 and decommissioned in 1875. During that time she saw significant action in the American Civil War.
- USS Narragansett (SP-1163), a United States Navy ship
- USS Narragansett (SP-2196), a passenger liner that served as a troopship in Europe during World War I.
- USS Narragansett (YFB-1163), built in 1905, purchased by the Navy in 1918 and struck in 1944.
- USS Narragansett (AT-88), commissioned in 1943 and decommissioned in 1946.
- USNS Narragansett (T-ATF-167), a fleet ocean tug launched in 1979 and struck in 2002.
- USNS Narragansett (T-ATS-14), a planned Navajo-class rescue and salvage ship
