= USS New England =

USS New England has been the name of more than one United States Navy ship, and may refer to:

- USS New England (1861), a whaler purchased in 1861 and sunk as an obstruction as part of the "Stone Fleet" in 1862
- USS New England (SP-1222), a tug in commission from 1917 to 1919
- USS New England (AD-32), a ship originally planned as a submarine tender (AS-28), laid down as a destroyer tender (AD-32) in 1944, and cancelled in 1945 prior to launching
