= USS Nettle =

USS Nettle may refer to the following ships of the United States Navy:

- USS Nettle (1814), was a galley launched in 1814 and sold in 1825
- USS Nettle (1862), was a side-wheel steamer acquired by the US Navy in September 1862 and sunk in a collision in October 1865
