= USS Nanticoke =

USS Nanticoke may refer to the following ships operated by the United States Navy:

- USS Nanticoke (AOG-66), a gasoline tanker launched in 1945, was eventually acquired by the Argentine Navy served there until 1985
- Nanticoke (YTB-803), a large harbor tug launched in 1969, was struck in 1999
