= USS Orvetta =

USS Orvetta is a name used more than once by the U.S. Navy:

- USS Orvetta (1861), an American Civil War schooner
- USS Orvetta (IX-157), a barracks ship commissioned 7 June 1944
