= USS Nathaniel Taylor =

History
- Name: Nathaniel Taylor
- Fate: Captured 8 April 1863
- Name: USS Nathaniel Taylor
- Acquired: 19 May 1863
- Fate: Sunk as an obstruction

General characteristics
- Sail plan: Schooner

USS Nathaniel Taylor was a Union schooner.

USS Commodore Perry captured the schooner, Nathaniel Taylor, in the Pasquotank River, North Carolina, 8 April 1863.

== Assigned to the stone fleet ==
Although the schooner was not sent north for adjudication, the Union Navy purchased her from the New York City prize court 19 May 1863, and she was sunk as an obstruction at Petit Bois Channel.

== See also ==
- Union Blockade
