= USS Octavia =

Cargo ship of the United States Navy

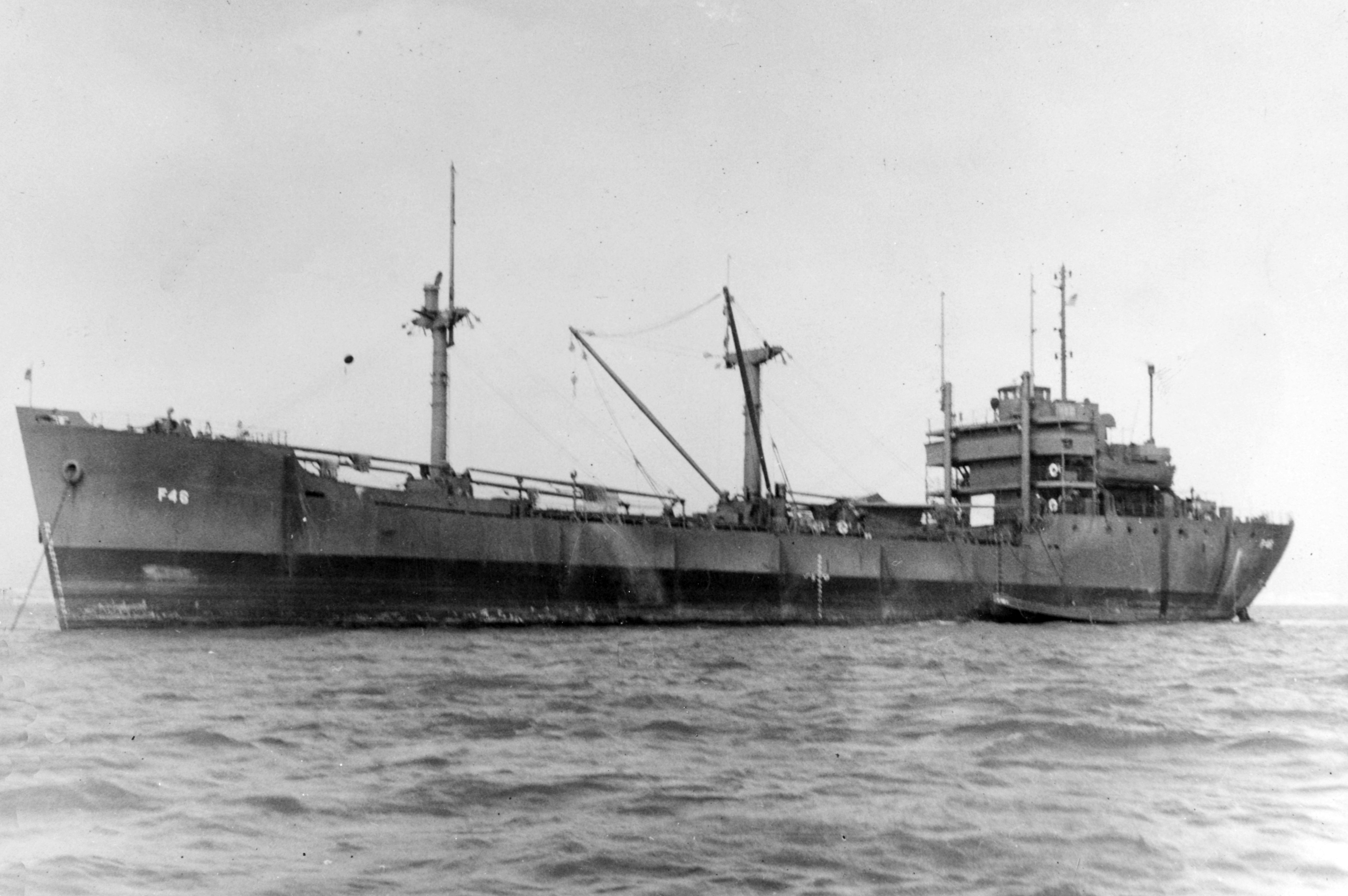

History

United States
- Ordered: as R1-M-AV3 hull, MC hull 2338
- Laid down: 22 November 1944
- Launched: 18 January 1945
- Acquired: 31 May 1945
- Commissioned: 19 June 1945
- Decommissioned: 12 August 1946
- Stricken: 8 October 1946
- Identification: IMO number: 5395151
- Fate: Converted to fish factory ship; Scrapped, 2006

General characteristics
- Tonnage: 2,120 long tons deadweight (DWT)
- Displacement: 3,139 t.(lt) 6,240 t.(fl)
- Length: 338 ft (103 m)
- Beam: 50 ft (15 m)
- Draught: 18 ft (5.5 m)
- Propulsion: diesel engine, single screw, 1,700shp
- Speed: 12 kts. (max)
- Complement: 84
- Armament: one single 3 in (76 mm) dual purpose gun mount, six single 20 mm gun mounts

USS Octavia (AF-46) was an Adria-class stores ship in service with the United States Navy from 1945 to 1946. She was sold into commercial service in 1972 and was scrapped in 2006.

== History ==
Octavia was laid down as MC Hull 2338 under a Maritime Commission contract 22 November 1944 by Pennsylvania Shipyards, Inc., Beaumont, Texas; named Octavia 6 December 1944; launched 18 January 1945; sponsored by Mrs. J. Linscott; acquired by the Navy on loan charter from the Maritime Commission 31 May 1945; and commissioned 19 June 1945.

=== World War II ===
Upon completion of shakedown, Octavia departed Galveston, Texas, 12 July 1945 for Pearl Harbor, sailing via the Panama Canal and San Pedro, California. From the end of August to the first week in December, she made two round trips between the big Hawaiian base and the Marshall Islands. Octavia returned to the U.S. West Coast for upkeep, arriving at Seattle, Washington, on 18 December. On 8 January 1946, with a full load of stores, she sailed to Subic Bay, Manila, and Samar in the Philippines, returning to Seattle on 26 March. Following two final trips to Pearl Harbor, Octavia arrived in San Francisco Bay 30 May.

=== Decommissioning and fate ===
Decommissioned 12 August, Octavia was turned over to the War Shipping Administration the same day and was struck from the Navy List 8 October. Renamed Yardarm Knot, she was berthed at Suisun Bay, California, as part of the Maritime Administration Reserve Fleet. In 1972, she was sold by the Maritime Administration. At some point between 1972 and 1985, she was converted into a fish factory ship. In 1985, Yardarm Knot Inc. was incorporated to acquire M/V Yardarm Knot, which had been sitting idle in Lake Washington, Seattle, WA for several years at that point. Yardarm Knot Inc. operated her as their primary ship for over a decade, moving over a million pounds a day of fish through her processing lines at peak. In 1999, Yardarm Knot became inactive, and was sold again in 2004. Renamed to Momma, she was sent to scrap in Alang, India in August 2006. Current Disposition: Scrapped in 2006.

== Military awards and honors ==
Octavia’s crew was eligible for the following medals:

- American Campaign Medal
- Asiatic-Pacific Campaign Medal
- World War II Victory Medal
- Navy Occupation Service Medal (with Asia clasp)
