= USS Natalia =

Patrol vessel of the United States Navy

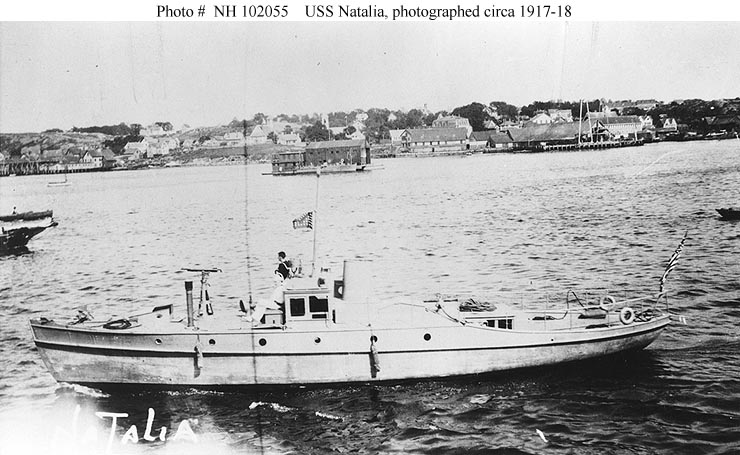
- USS Natalia (SP-1251) during World War I.

History

United States
- Name: USS Natalia
- Namesake: Previous name retained
- Completed: 1909
- Acquired: 8 May 1917
- Commissioned: 8 May 1917
- Fate: Returned to owner 5 July 1918
- Notes: Operated as private motorboat Natalia 1909-1917 and from 1918

General characteristics
- Type: Patrol vessel
- Length: 55 ft (17 m)
- Beam: 10 ft 3 in (3.12 m)
- Draft: 6 ft 6 in (1.98 m)
- Speed: 12 knots
- Armament: 1 × .30-caliber (7.62-mm) machine gun

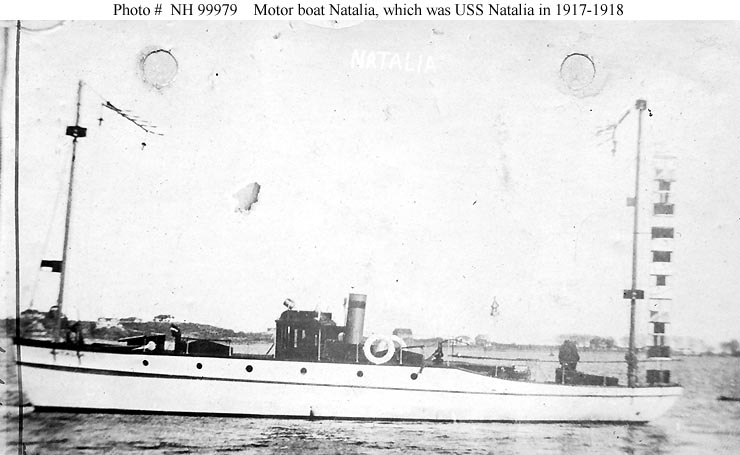
Natalia as a private motorboat sometime between 1909 and 1917.

USS Natalia (SP-1251) was a United States Navy patrol vessel in commission from 1917 to 1918

Natalia was built as a private motorboat of the same name in 1909 at either Stamford, Connecticut, or Gloucester, Massachusetts, to a design by Whittelsey & Whitaker. On 8 May 1917 the U.S. Navy acquired her from her owner, John Hayes Hammond Jr., of either Gloucester or Stamford, for use as a section patrol boat during World War I. She was commissioned the same day as USS Natalia (SP-1251).

Assigned to the 1st Naval District in northern New England, Natalia entered service as a section patrol boat. However, she proved unsuitable for naval use and was returned to Hammond on 5 July 1918.
