= USS Okinawa =

Two ships of the United States Navy have been named USS Okinawa, in honor of the Battle of Okinawa.

- The first USS Okinawa (CVE-127) was to be a Commencement Bay-class escort carrier, but was cancelled before completion.
- The second USS Okinawa (LPH-3) was an Iwo Jima-class amphibious assault ship in service from 1962 to 1992.
