= USS Nelansu =

United States Navy patrol vessel

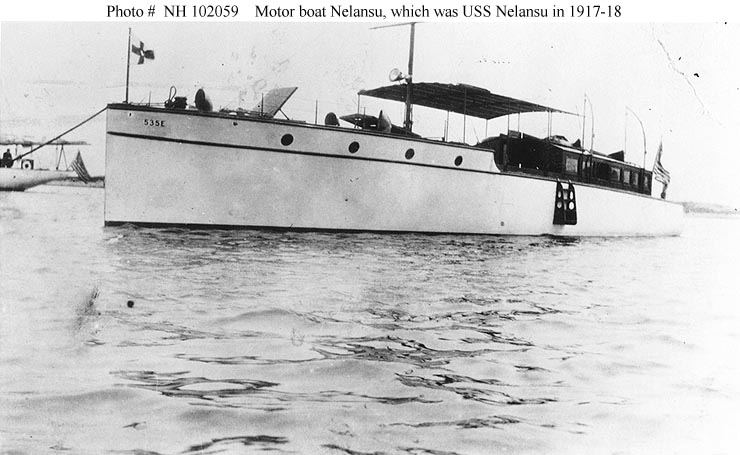
- Nelansu as a private motorboat prior to her acquisition by the U.S. Navy.

History

United States
- Name: USS Nelansu
- Namesake: Previous name retained
- Builder: R. Bigelow, Monument Beach, Massachusetts
- Acquired: Either on or prior to 26 May 1917 or on 20 July 1917
- Commissioned: 26 May 1917
- Decommissioned: 30 November 1918
- Fate: Returned to owner 30 November 1918
- Notes: Operated as private motorboat U. S. Kent and Nelansu until 1917 and Nelansu from 1918

General characteristics
- Type: Patrol vessel
- Tonnage: 15 gross register tons
- Length: 51 ft 1.5 in (15.583 m)
- Beam: 10 ft 0 in (3.05 m)
- Draft: 2 ft 10 in (0.86 m)
- Speed: 22 knots
- Complement: 8
- Armament: 1 × 1-pounder gun

USS Nelansu (SP-610) was a United States Navy patrol vessel in commission from 1917 to 1918.

Nelansu was built as a private motorboat by R. Bigelow at Monument Beach, Massachusetts. Some sources say her original name was U. S. Kent, while others state that this only was a possibility, but all agree that she was named Nelansu by 1917.

In 1917, the U.S. Navy acquired her under a free lease from her owner, John S. Kent, for use as a section patrol boat during World War I, and she was commissioned as USS Nelansu (SP-610). Sources disagree on the timing of these events, claiming acquisition dates of both 26 May and 20 July 1917; the only source to provide a commissioning date places it on 26 May 1917.

Assigned to the 1st Naval District in northern New England, Kiowa carried out patrol duties in the Boston, Massachusetts, area for the rest of World War I.

Nelansu was decommissioned on 30 November 1918 and returned to Kent the same day.
