= USS Nakarna (YTM-393) =

History

United States
- Name: USS Nakarna
- Builder: Consolidated Shipbuilding Corp., Morris Heights, New York
- Laid down: September 1944
- Launched: 28 October 1944
- Reclassified: YTM–393, February 1962
- Fate: Still active as of 1970

General characteristics
- Type: Tugboat
- Displacement: 237 long tons (241 t)
- Length: 100 ft (30 m)
- Beam: 25 ft (7.6 m)
- Draft: 9 ft 7 in (2.92 m)
- Speed: 12 knots (22 km/h; 14 mph)
- Complement: 8

USS Nakarna (YTB-393/YTM-393) was laid down in September 1944 by Consolidated Shipbuilding Corp., Morris Heights, New York; named on 16 May; launched on 28 October; delivered 6 February 1945 and assigned duties in the 3rd Naval District.

Her primary function was to support the Navy in the New York area. There she provided assistance in the vicinity of anchorages and piers for berthing and docking evolutions. She also provided towing services and waterfront fire protection, and served as an inner harbor patrol craft.

At the end of hostilities she was placed out of service and berthed with reserve units of the 16th Fleet at Green Cove Springs, Florida.

She was reactivated in August 1946 and assigned to 6th Naval District duties in the immediate area of Charleston, South Carolina. Reclassified YTM–393 in February 1962, she continued to serve in support of the active forces of the Navy into 1970.
