= USS Nimble =

USS Nimble may refer to the following ships of the United States Navy:

- USS Nimble (AM-266), was a minesweeper commissioned in 1944 and transferred to Taiwan in 1948
- USS Nimble (MSO-459), was a minesweeper commissioned in 1955 and sold in 1981
