= USS Naubuc =

USS Naubuc may refer to the following ships of the United States Navy:

- USS Naubuc (1864), a monitor during the American Civil War
- USS Naubuc (AN-84), a net laying ship in operation at the end of World War II
