= USS Nassau =

USS Nassau may refer to:

- USS Nassau (CVE-16) was an escort aircraft carrier in service from 1943 to 1946.
- USS Nassau (LHA-4) is an amphibious assault ship commissioned 1979 and decommissioned in 2011
