= USS Newton =

USS Newton may refer to the following ships operated by the United States Navy:

- USS Newton (1901), was launched in 1901; acquired by the US Navy in 1918 and used as a troop transport until 1919
- USS Newton (ID-4306), was acquired by the US Navy in 1922, redesignated IX-33 in 1941 and sold in September 1946
