= USS Oxford =

USS Oxford is a name used more than once by the U.S. Navy:

- USS Oxford (APA-189), an attack transport commissioned 11 September 1944.
- USS Oxford (AGTR-1), laid down 23 June 1945.
