= USS Octopus =

USS Octopus may refer to:

- USS Octopus (SS-9), a United States Navy submarine in commission from 1908 to 1919 and renamed USS C-1 (SS-9) in 1911
- USS Octopus, a fictional World War II United States Navy submarine in Edward L. Beach's 1955 novel Run Silent, Run Deep
