= USS Neoga =

Tugboat of the United States Navy

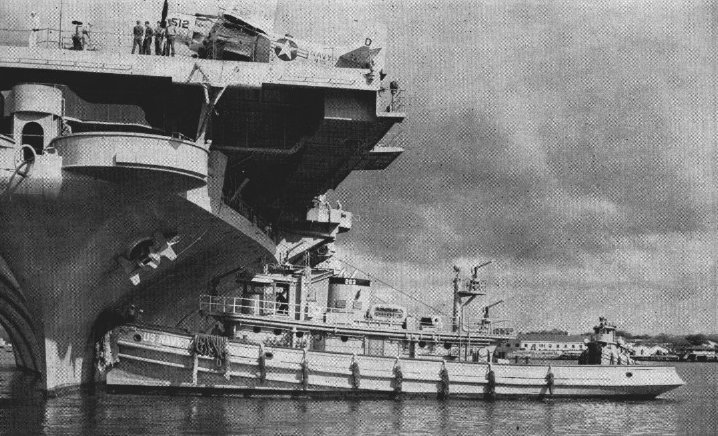
- USS Neoga (YTB-263) nudges USS Hancock (CVA-19) into the channel at Pearl Harbor.

History

United States
- Name: USS Neoga (YTB-263)
- Builder: J.M. Martinac Shipbuilding Corp., Tacoma, WA
- Laid down: 24 December 1943
- Launched: 13 June 1944
- In service: 21 October 1944
- Out of service: 1 May 1965
- Reclassified: District Harbor Tug, Large YTB-264 15 May 1944; District Harbor Tug, Medium YTM-263 in February 1962
- Stricken: 1 May 1965
- Fate: unknown

General characteristics
- Class & type: Cahto-class district harbor tug
- Displacement: 410 long tons (417 t)
- Length: 110 ft 0 in (33.53 m)
- Beam: 27 ft 0 in (8.23 m)
- Draft: 11 ft 4 in (3.45 m)
- Speed: 12 knots (22 km/h; 14 mph)
- Complement: 12
- Armament: 2 × .50-caliber machine guns

USS Neoga (YTB-263) was laid down as YT–263, 24 December 1943, by the J.M. Martinac Shipbuilding Corp., Tacoma, Washington; named Neoga 28 April 1944; reclassified YTB–263, 15 May 1944; launched 13 June 1944; and placed in service 21 October 1944.

== Service life ==
Neoga, a harbor tug, performed towing, docking, berthing, firefighting, and salvage services in the 14th Naval District, headquartered at Pearl Harbor, throughout her career. Redesignated YTM–263 in February 1962, she was placed out of service and struck from the Navy List 1 May 1965.
