= USS Oneota =

USS Oneota may refer to the following ships of the United States Navy:

- USS Oneota (1864), a monitor built in Ohio for the American Civil War
- USS Oneota (AN-85), a net laying ship built during World War II
