= USS Ossipee =

USS Ossipee may refer to the following ships of the United States Navy:

- USS Ossipee (1861), launched in 1861, commissioned in 1862 and decommissioned for the final time in 1889.
- USS Ossipee (WPG-50), commissioned in 1915 for coastal service, transferred to the Navy in 1917, served in the Coast Guard during Prohibition, returned to the Navy in 1941 and decommissioned in 1945.
