= USS Niji =

Patrol vessel of the United States Navy

History

United States
- Name: USS Niji
- Namesake: Previous name retained
- Builder: Essington Shipbuilding Company, Essington, Pennsylvania
- Completed: 1914
- Acquired: 21 June 1917
- Commissioned: 21 June 1917
- Fate: Returned to owner 21 January 1919
- Notes: Operated as private motorboat Wilfreda and Niji 1914-1917 and Niji from 1919

General characteristics
- Type: Patrol vessel
- Length: 50 ft 2 in (15.29 m)
- Beam: 9 ft 6 in (2.90 m)
- Draft: 5 ft (1.5 m)
- Speed: 21 knots
- Complement: 10
- Armament: 2 × 1-pounder guns

USS Niji (SP-33) was an armed motorboat that served in the United States Navy as a patrol vessel from 1917 to 1919.

Niji was built in 1914 by Essington Shipbuilding Company at Essington, Pennsylvania, as the private motorboat Wilfreda. She had been renamed Niji by the time the U.S. Navy acquired her from her owner, R. B. McEwan of New York City, on 21 June 1917 for World War I service. She was commissioned as USS Niji (SP-33) the same day.

Niji was assigned to the 2nd Naval District, headquartered at Newport, Rhode Island. She spent the war patrolling the waters off southern New England.

The Navy decommissioned Niji after the end of the war and returned her to her former owner on 21 January 1919.
