= USS Najelda =

Patrol vessel of the United States Navy

History

United States
- Name: USS Najelda
- Builder: N. Emanuel, Brunswick, Georgia
- Launched: 1907
- Acquired: 1 May 1917
- Commissioned: 6 May 1917
- Decommissioned: 9 December 1918
- Stricken: 11 June 1919
- Fate: Sold, 30 October 1919

General characteristics
- Type: Patrol boat
- Displacement: 52 long tons (53 t)
- Length: 65 ft (20 m)
- Beam: 18 ft 5 in (5.61 m)
- Draft: 5 ft (1.5 m)
- Speed: 10 knots (19 km/h; 12 mph)
- Complement: 5
- Armament: 1 × 6-pounder gun; 2 × machine guns

USS Najelda (SP-277) was a wooden motor boat, was built in 1907 by N. Emanuel, Brunswick, Georgia, for Capt. F. P. Barry, of New Orleans, Louisiana. She was acquired by the United States Navy on 1 May 1917, and commissioned on 6 May 1917.

After patrol duty along the Gulf Coast, she was decommissioned on 9 December 1918, struck from the Naval Vessel Register on 11 June 1919, and sold to A. Denapolis, New Orleans, on 30 October 1919.
