= USS Nahunta =

Seagoing barge in the American navy, 1917–1919

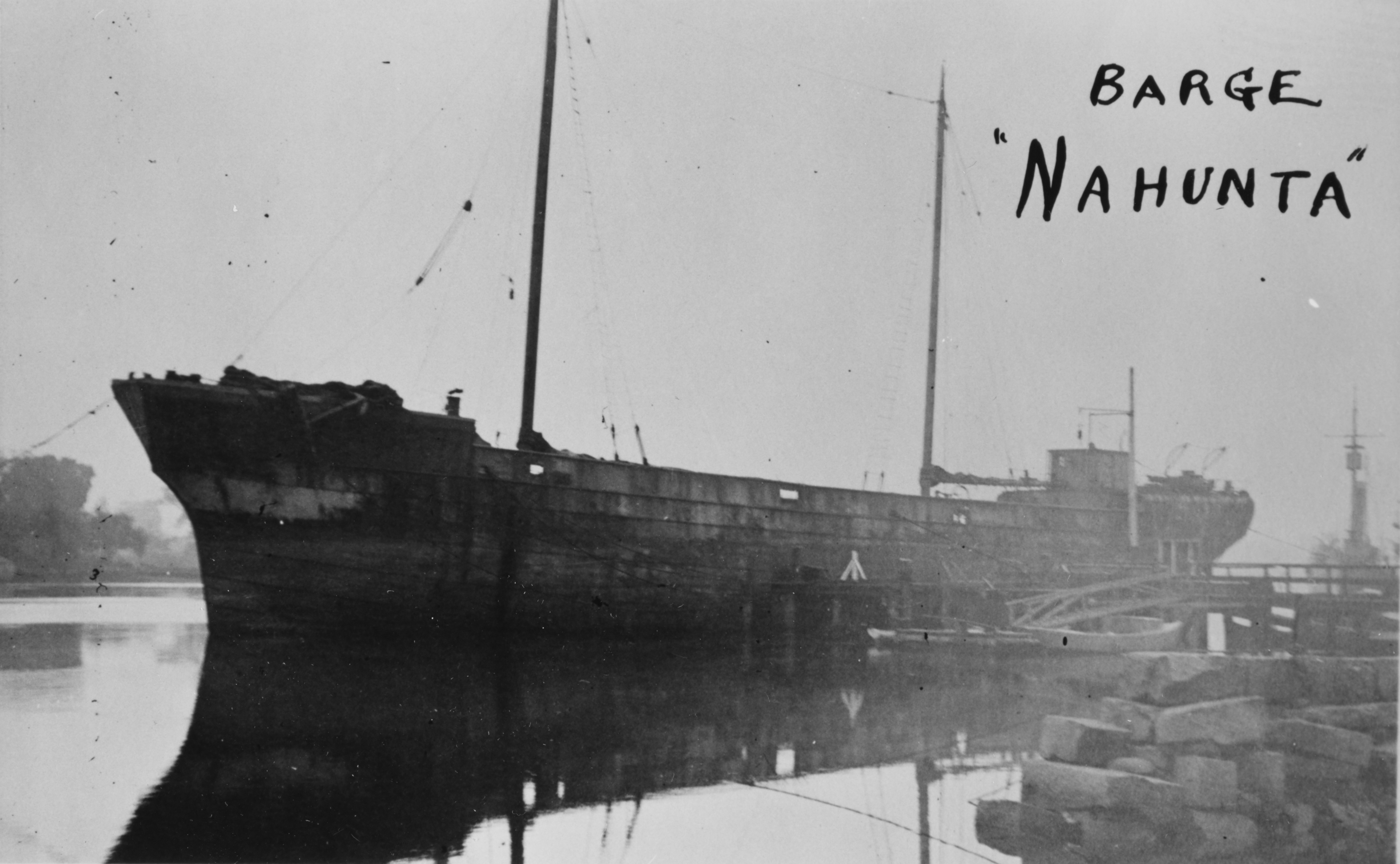

History

United States
- Name: USS Nahunta
- Builder: Aitken Mansel, Glasgow, Scotland
- Laid down: 1872
- Commissioned: 8 August 1917
- Fate: Sold, 2 October 1919

General characteristics
- Type: Barge
- Displacement: 1,213 long tons (1,232 t)
- Length: 226 ft 6 in (69.04 m)
- Beam: 38 ft 8 in (11.79 m)
- Draft: 21 ft (6.4 m)
- Complement: 6

USS Nahunta, a seagoing barge, was built as West Point by Aitken Mansel, Glasgow, Scotland, in 1872. It was acquired by the United States Navy as Nahunta from Luckenbach Steamship Co., Inc. of New York City and commissioned 8 August 1917.

The barge operated in the 5th Naval District until assigned to Naval Overseas Transportation Service on 8 August 1917. Nahunta served along the east coast carrying coal from Norfolk, Virginia, until 15 August 1919 when she was detached from NOTS. She continued duty in the 5th Naval District until sold on 2 October.

The ship takes its name from the city of Nahunta, Georgia. The Nahunta retained its former name after being sold.
