= USS Nahant =

USS Nahant may refer to the following ships of the United States Navy:

- USS Nahant (1862), an ironclad monitor launched in 1862 that saw service in the American Civil War and the Spanish–American War
- USS Nahant (SP-1250), a tugboat acquired by the U.S. Navy in 1917 and decommissioned in 1928
- USS Nahant (AN-83), a net laying ship commissioned in 1945 and sold to Uruguay in 1968
