= USS Nitro =

USS Nitro may refer to the following ships of the United States Navy:

- USS Nitro (AE-2), a Pyro-class ammunition ship launched in 1919 and sold for scrap in 1949
- USS Nitro (AE-23), lead ship of the Nitro class of ammunition ship; launched in 1958 and struck in 1995
