= USS Otsego =

USS Otsego may refer to the following ships of the United States Navy:

- USS Otsego (1840), was a small schooner obtained on loan from the Army in 1840 for action against the Seminole Indians
- USS Otsego (1863), was a gunboat commissioned in the spring of 1864
- USS Tunxis (1864) was a light draft monitor originally which was renamed Hydra in 1869 and Ostego^{?} later that year
- SS Otsego was a passenger-cargo steamship built in Germany in 1902 as Prinz Eitel Friedrich which in 1919 served as the troop transport USS Otsego (ID-1628)
