= USS Niantic =

USS Niantic may refer to the following ships operated by the United States:

- USS Niantic (CVE-46), was a light aircraft carrier launched in June 1943 and transferred to the United Kingdom on 8 November and commissioned as Ranee. She was sold in 1947.
- Niantic (YTB-781), was a large harbor tug launched in 1965 and sold in 2006
