= USS Natahki =

Tugboat of the United States Navy

History

United States
- Name: USS Natahki (YTB-398)
- Namesake: Natahki was the name of a Piegan Blackfeet Indian woman who was married to noted explorer and national park guide James Willard Schultz.
- Builder: Gibbs Gas Engine Co., Jacksonville, Florida
- Laid down: 15 May 1944 (As YT–398)
- Launched: 2 November 1944
- Commissioned: 13 April 1945
- Reclassified: 1.District Harbor Tug, Large (YTB-398) while still under construction 15 May 1944; 2.District Harbor Tug, Medium (YTM-398) in February 1962
- Fate: Sold for scrapping by the Defense Reutilization and Marketing Service (DRMS), 6 April 1987

General characteristics
- Class & type: Sassaba-class harbor tug
- Type: Harbor Tug
- Displacement: 237 tons light; 310 tons full load
- Length: 101 ft (31 m)
- Beam: 28 ft (8.5 m)
- Draft: 11 ft (3.4 m)
- Propulsion: Diesel engine, single propeller
- Speed: 12 kn (22 km/h; 14 mph)
- Complement: 10
- Armament: 2 x .50-caliber machine guns

USS Natahki (YTB-398) was a Sassaba-class harbor tug that served in the United States Navy from 1945 into the mid-1980s. The exact date she was decommissioned is unknown.

Natahki was assigned to the Pacific Fleet (11th Naval District, San Diego, California) upon delivery to the Navy. She served out the duration of World War II there and into 1946 when, like many wartime ships, she was placed in reserve as surplus. In 1951, Natahki was withdrawn from reserve and re-activated in the 11th Naval District. Records of her service from 1951 onward are virtually non-existent although presumably she served in southern California ports for the remainder of her career. Natahki was re-designated a district harbor tug, medium (YTM) in February 1962.

Her name was struck from the Navy list sometime in the mid-1980s and she was sold for scrapping by the Defense Reutilization and Marketing Service (DRMS), 6 April 1987.
