= Ocala (YTB-805) =

United States Navy tugboat

History

United States
- Namesake: Ocala, Florida
- Awarded: 4 March 1969
- Builder: Peterson Builders, Sturgeon Bay, WI
- Laid down: 20 August 1969
- Launched: 30 March 1970
- In service: 19 September 1970
- Out of service: 28 October 1997
- Renamed: Beth M. McAllister
- Stricken: 28 October 1997
- Identification: IMO number: 8980919; MMSI number: 366995010; Callsign: WCZ8598
- Fate: Sold into civilian service, 4 May 2000

General characteristics
- Class & type: Natick-class large harbor tug
- Displacement: 282 long tons (287 t) (light); 341 long tons (346 t) (full)
- Length: 109 ft (33 m)
- Beam: 31 ft (9.4 m)
- Draft: 14 ft (4.3 m)
- Speed: 12 knots (14 mph; 22 km/h)
- Complement: 12

Ocala (YTB-805) was a United States Navy Natick-class large harbor tug named for Ocala, Florida.

== Construction ==
The contract for Ocala was awarded on 4 March 1969; she was laid down on 20 August of the same year at Sturgeon Bay, Wisconsin by Peterson Builders, and launched on 20 March 1970.

== Operational history ==
Placed in service on 19 September 1970, Ocala was assigned to the Naval Base at La Maddalena, Italy where she served her whole career.

Stricken from the Navy List on 28 October 1997, Ocala was sold by the Defense Reutilization and Marketing Service (DRMS) to McAllister Towing, and renamed Beth M. McAllister.
