= USS O'Toole =

USS O'Toole has been the name of more than one United States Navy ship, and may refer to:

- USS O'Toole (DE-274), a destroyer escort transferred to the United Kingdom upon completion which served in the Royal Navy as HMS Gardiner (K478) from 1943 to 1945
- USS O'Toole (DE-327), a destroyer escort renamed USS Brister (DE-327) in 1943 while under construction
- USS O'Toole (DE-527), a destroyer escort in commission from 1944 to 1945
