= USS Nadli =

Tugboat of the United States Navy

History

United States
- Name: USS Nadli
- Builder: Consolidated Shipbuilding Corp., Morris Heights, New York
- Laid down: 1944
- Launched: July 1945
- Reclassified: YTM–534, February 1962
- Status: Unknown
- Notes: Was still active in 1970

General characteristics
- Type: Tugboat
- Displacement: 237 long tons (241 t)
- Length: 100 ft (30 m)
- Beam: 25 ft (7.6 m)
- Draft: 11 ft 6 in (3.51 m)
- Speed: 12 knots (22 km/h; 14 mph)
- Complement: 8

USS Nadli (YTB-534/YTM-534) was a Hisada-class harbor tug in the service of the United States Navy.

Nadli provided towing and berthing services in the San Francisco Bay area. She also assumed waterfront fire protection and inner harbor patrol duties on an on-call basis. In March 1946 Nadli was placed in reserve, out of service, and berthed at Astoria, Oregon. She shifted berths to Green Cove Springs, Florida in 1954 and remained there until July 1955.

Reactivated in August 1956, Nadli was assigned to the 3rd Naval District. She was redesignated YTM–534 in February 1962 and remained active in the New York area until 1967. The next year she was reassigned to the 10th Naval District and operated in San Juan Harbor, Puerto Rico, until at least 1970.
