= USS Nausett =

USS Nausett may refer to the following ships of the United States Navy:

- USS Nausett (1865), a light draft monitor, built by Donald McKay, South Boston, Massachusetts
- USS Nausett (YT-35), the second name of wooden tug USS Carl R. Gray (No. 2671); renamed on 24 November 1920
- USS Nausett (IX-190), a tanker completed in April 1918 by the Bethlehem Shipbuilding Corp., Alameda, California
- USS Nausett (ACM-15), originally a mine planter for the U.S. Army; transferred to the U.S. Navy in March 1951
- USS Nauset (AT-89)
