= USS Noa =

USS Noa may refer to the following ships of the United States Navy:

- USS Noa (DD-343), a destroyer, commissioned in 1921, converted to a transport and sunk in an accident in 1944.
- USS Noa (DD-841), commissioned in 1946, stricken in 1975 and transferred to Spain.
