= USS Nautilus II (SP-559) =

US Coast Guard patrol vessel

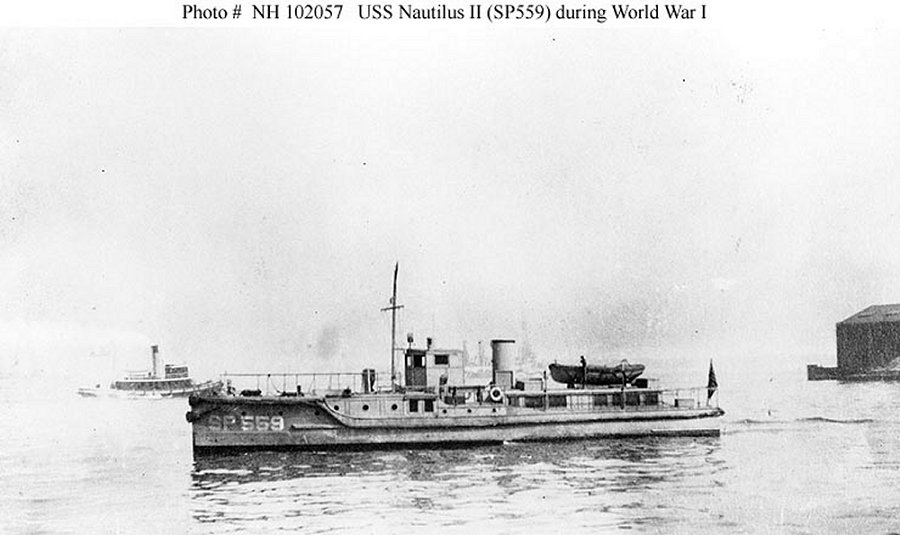

History

United States
- Name: USS Nautilus II
- Builder: Kyle & Purday Shipyard, City Island, New York
- Launched: 1917
- Acquired: 17 August 1917
- Commissioned: 9 October 1917
- Decommissioned: 14 February 1919
- Fate: Returned to owner, 14 February 1919

General characteristics
- Type: Motor yacht
- Tonnage: 23 long tons (23 t)
- Length: 60 ft 6 in (18.44 m)
- Beam: 11 ft 6 in (3.51 m)
- Draft: 3 ft 1 in (0.94 m)
- Speed: 18 knots (33 km/h; 21 mph)
- Complement: 8

Nautilus II was a motor pleasure boat built at City Island, New York in early 1917. She was enrolled in the Naval Coast Defense Reserve and commissioned into the United States Navy in October 1917 as the motor patrol boat USS Nautilus (SP-559), and assigned to patrol and escort duties of the New York City area for the remainder of World War I. She was decommissioned and returned to her owner, E.E. Dickinson of Essex County, Connecticut, on 14 February 1919.

The U.S. Navy considers the name Nautilus II to be separate from the Nautilus lineage.
