= USS Onset =

Patrol vessel of the United States Navy

History

United States
- Name: USS Onset
- Namesake: Previous name retained
- Builder: Hacketts, Bayonne, New Jersey
- Completed: 1888
- Acquired: 15 June 1917
- Commissioned: 1917
- Decommissioned: 21 December 1918
- Fate: Returned to owner 21 December 1918
- Notes: Operated as private motorboat Onset 1888-1917 and from 1918

General characteristics
- Type: Patrol vessel
- Tonnage: 5 Gross register tons
- Length: 40 ft 0 in (12.19 m)
- Beam: 13 ft 0 in (3.96 m)
- Draft: 2 ft 6 in (0.76 m)
- Speed: 6 knots
- Complement: 6
- Armament: 1 × 1-pounder gun

USS Onset (SP-1224) was a United States Navy patrol vessel in commission from 1917 to 1918.

Onset was built as a private motorboat of the same name in 1888 by Hacketts at Bayonne, New Jersey. She was rebuilt in 1910. On 15 June 1917, the U.S. Navy acquired Onset from her owner, W. H. Steelman of Chincoteague, Virginia, for use as a section patrol boat during World War I. She was commissioned as USS Onset (SP-1224).

Assigned to the 5th Naval District and based at Norfolk, Virginia, Onset performed patrol duties for the rest of World War I.

The Navy decommissioned Onset on 21 December 1918 and returned her to Steelman the same day.
