= USS Nirvana =

USS Nirvana or USS Nirvana II may refer to more than one United States Navy ship:

- USS Nirvana (SP-706), later USS SP-706, a patrol vessel in commission in 1917 and from 1918 to 1919
- USS Nirvana II (SP-204), a patrol vessel in commission from 1917 to 1918
