= USS Osage =

Two ships of the United States Navy have been named Osage after the Osage Native American tribe.

- USS Osage (1863), a single-turreted Neosho-class river monitor
- USS Osage (LSV-3), a vehicle landing ship which served during World War II
