= USS Oconee =

History

United States
- Name: USS Oconee
- Namesake: Oconee River in Georgia
- Ordered: as T1-M-A2 tanker hull; MC hull 1531
- Builder: East Coast Shipyard, Inc., Bayonne, New Jersey
- Laid down: 18 October 1944
- Launched: 19 November 1944
- Acquired: 23 December 1944
- Commissioned: 23 December 1944
- Decommissioned: 28 March 1946
- Stricken: 1 May 1946
- Identification: IMO number: 5279204
- Fate: Reflagged Brazilian, scrapped November 2003

General characteristics
- Class & type: Mettawee-class gasoline tanker
- Tonnage: 1,228 tonnes deadweight (DWT)
- Displacement: 846 long tons (860 t) light; 2,270 long tons (2,306 t) full load
- Length: 220 ft 6 in (67.21 m)
- Beam: 37 ft (11 m)
- Draft: 17 ft (5.2 m)
- Propulsion: Diesel direct drive, single screw, 720 hp (537 kW)
- Speed: 10 knots (19 km/h; 12 mph)
- Complement: 62
- Armament: 1 × 3"/50 caliber gun; 2 × single 40 mm guns; 3 × single 20 mm guns

USS Oconee (AOG-34) was a Mettawee-class gasoline tanker acquired by the U.S. Navy for the dangerous task of transporting gasoline to warships in the fleet, and to remote Navy stations.

Oconee, formerly MC Hull 1531, was laid down under a Maritime Commission contract on 18 October 1944 by East Coast Shipyard, Inc., Bayonne, New Jersey; launched 19 November 1944; sponsored by Miss Ethel Borst; acquired by the Navy on 23 December 1944; and commissioned 12 January 1945.

== World War II service ==
Following shakedown in the Chesapeake Bay, Oconee, manned by a U.S. Coast Guard crew, sailed to Bermuda and Aruba before transiting the Panama Canal 15 March 1945. Stopping briefly at San Diego, California, the gasoline tanker proceeded to Pearl Harbor, arriving there 4 May. After a short upkeep period she sailed unescorted to Eniwetok, Marshall Islands, thence on to Ulithi. From mid-June to the end of July she serviced all sizes of ships and craft in the huge anchorage then steamed to Okinawa with her vital cargo. She remained there through the end of the war, serving ships of the mighty U.S. fleet and riding out two treacherous typhoons.

== Post-war decommissioning ==
On 12 November Oconee sailed for San Francisco, California, stopping at Pearl Harbor before arriving on 28 December. She decommissioned there on 28 March 1946, was struck from the Navy List on 1 May, and returned to the Maritime Commission on 1 July. She was sold for commercial service, as M/V Piratini, and reflagged Brazilian. She was scrapped in November 2003.

== Military awards and honors ==
Oconee's crew was eligible for the following medals:

- American Campaign Medal
- Asiatic-Pacific Campaign Medal
- World War II Victory Medal
- Navy Occupation Service Medal (with Asia clasp)
