= USS Notable =

USS Notable is a name used more than once by the U.S. Navy:

- USS Notable (AM-267) was laid down 17 September 1943 by the Gulf Shipbuilding Corp., Chickasaw, Alabama.
- USS Notable (MSO-460) was laid down 8 June 1953 by Higgins Inc., New Orleans, Louisiana.
