= USS Newport =

USS Newport may refer to the following ships of the United States Navy:

- USS Newport (PG-12), was a gunboat that served during the Spanish–American War
- USS Newport (PF-27), was a Tacoma-class frigate that served during World War II
- USS Newport (LST-1179), was the lead ship of the Newport-class landing ship tank that served during the Cold War

== See also ==
- USNS Newport (T-EPF-12), is a Spearhead-class Expeditionary Fast Transport
