= USS Ortolan =

USS Ortolan is a name used more than once by the United States Navy in naming of its ships:

- USS Ortolan (AM-45) a minesweeper laid down on 9 July 1918 by the Staten Island Shipbuilding Co., New York, New York.
- USS Ortolan (AMCU-34) laid down as LCI(L)-976 on 15 March 1944.
- USS Ortolan (ASR-22) laid down on 28 August 1968 as a twin-hulled submarine rescue ship.
