= USS Neponset =

US Navy cargo ship during World War I

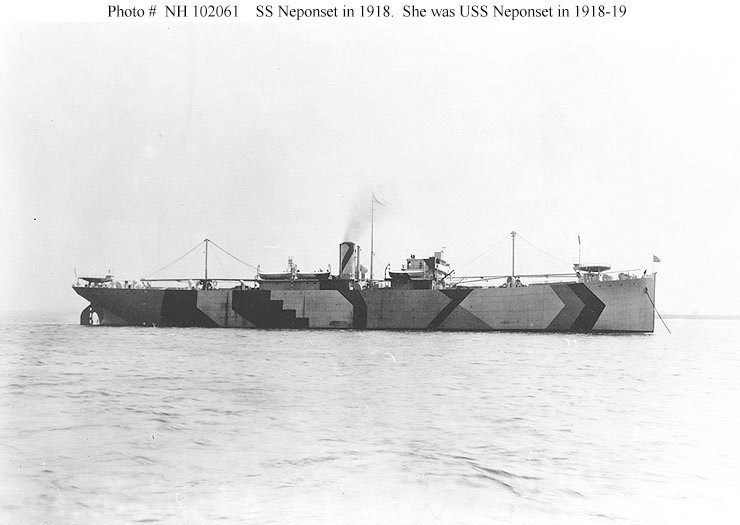

History

United States
- Name: USS Neponset
- Namesake: Neponset River
- Builder: Sun Shipbuilding & Drydock Co., Chester, Pennsylvania
- Laid down: 7 November 1917
- Launched: 4 July 1918
- Commissioned: 28 October 1918
- Decommissioned: 4 February 1919
- Fate: Returned to United States Shipping Board

General characteristics
- Type: Screw steamer
- Displacement: 16,008 long tons (16,265 t)
- Length: 450 ft (140 m)
- Beam: 57 ft 7 in (17.55 m)
- Draft: 28 ft 1 in (8.56 m)
- Speed: 10.5 knots (19.4 km/h; 12.1 mph)
- Complement: 86
- Armament: 1 × 5 in (130 mm) gun; 1 × 3 in (76 mm) gun

USS Neponset (ID-3581) was a cargo ship of the United States Navy during World War I. The ship was built by the Sun Shipbuilding & Drydock Co. in Chester, Pennsylvania. She was laid down as Shawmut on 7 November 1917 and launched on 4 July 1918.

The US Navy took ownership at New York on 28 October 1918, renamed her Neponset (ID-3581), and commissioned her the same day. Neponset made one voyage across the Atlantic carrying general cargo, horses, and veterinary replacement personnel. She cleared New York for France on 13 November 1918, arriving at Bordeaux on the 30th. She returned to the US, was decommissioned on 4 February 1919, and was returned to the United States Shipping Board. Later renamed again to Shawmut and Susan V. Luckenbach.
