= USS Ogden =

USS Ogden may refer to the following ships of the United States Navy:

- USS Ogden (PF-39), a Tacoma-class frigate commissioned in 1943; received three battle stars for World War II service.
- USS Ogden (LPD-5), an Austin-class amphibious transport dock; decommissioned 21 February 2007
