= USS Naiwa =

Cargo ship of the United States Navy

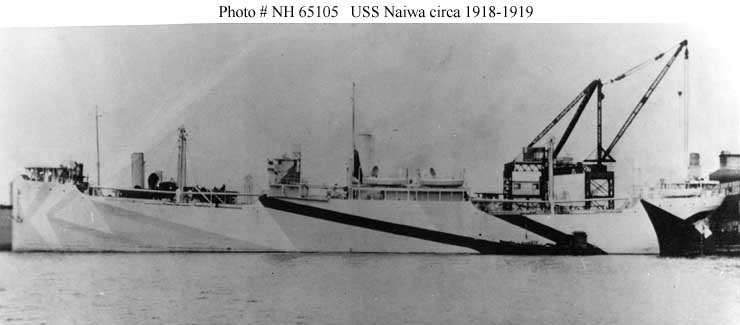
- USS Naiwa (ID-3512) probably shortly after its completion in late 1918.

History

United States
- Name: USS Naiwa
- Namesake: Previous name retained
- Builder: Baltimore Shipbuilding and Drydock Company, Baltimore, Maryland
- Launched: 4 July 1918
- Acquired: 10 September 1918
- Completed: October 1918
- Commissioned: 4 November 1918
- Decommissioned: 9 May 1919
- Fate: Transferred to U.S. Shipping Board 9 May 1919; Scrapped 1929
- Notes: Was SS Naiwa 1918 and 1919–1929

General characteristics
- Type: Cargo ship
- Tonnage: 6,240 GRT
- Displacement: 12,260 long tons (12,457 t) normal
- Length: 423 ft 9 in (129.16 m)
- Beam: 54 ft (16 m)
- Draft: 24 ft 6 in (7.47 m)
- Speed: 10.5 knots (19.4 km/h; 12.1 mph)
- Complement: 85
- Armament: 1 × 5 in (127 mm) gun; 1 × 4 in (102 mm) gun

USS Naiwa (SP-3512), was a cargo ship of the United States Navy in commission from 1918 to 1919.

== Construction, acquisition, and commissioning ==
Naiwa was laid down as the commercial cargo ship SS Naiwa by the Baltimore Shipbuilding and Drydock Company at Baltimore, Maryland, in 1918 for the United States Shipping Board. Launched on 4 July 1918, she was turned over to the U.S. Navy on 10 September 1918 and completed in October 1918. Assigned the naval registry identification number 3512, she was commissioned at Baltimore on 4 November 1918 as USS Naiwa (ID-3512).

== Operational history ==
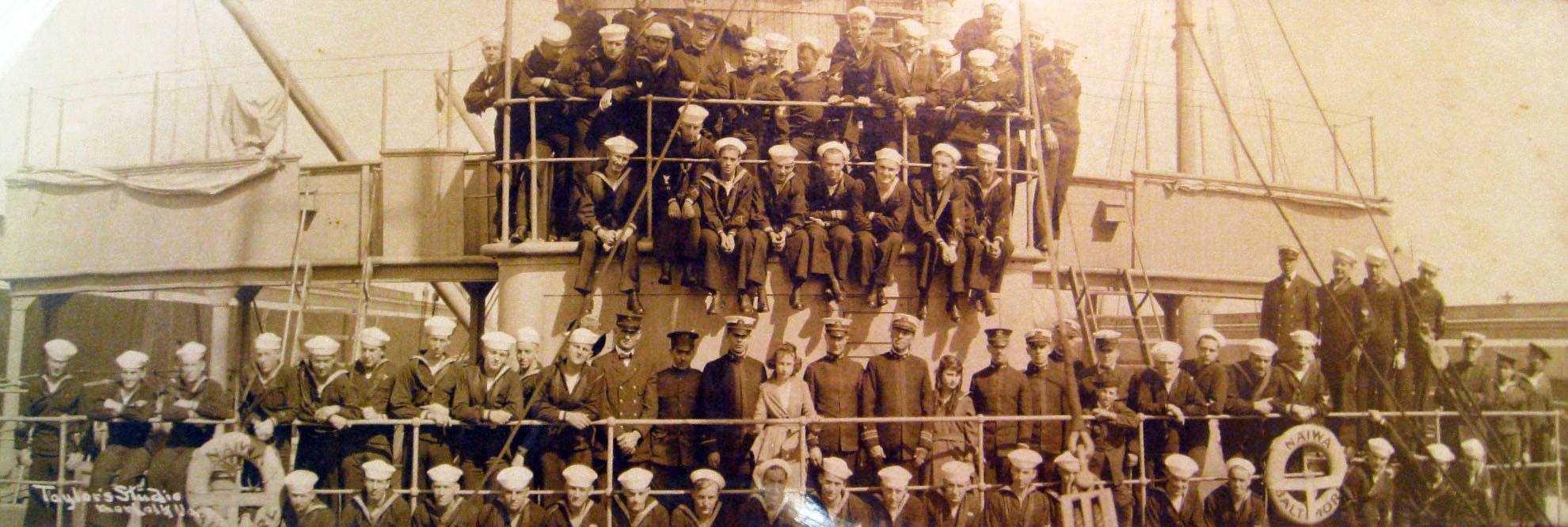
USS Naiwa's ship's company at Naval Operating Base Hampton Roads, 1919

Naiwa was assigned to Naval Overseas Transportation Service on a United States Army account. After refitting for naval service, Naiwa cleared Baltimore Harbor on 27 November 1918 with a general cargo for France, but was forced to turn back because of jammed steering gear. Following extensive repairs in drydock, she steamed from Norfolk, Virginia, on 8 March 1919 to again attempt a transatlantic crossing, and this time arrived at La Pallice, France, on 23 March 1919. She then went on to Bordeaux, where she discharged her cargo.

Naiwa cleared Bordeaux on 12 April 1919 and steamed to Brest, where she took on a cargo of 7,130 tons of German guns and gun parts, then departed for Norfolk, Virginia. She arrived at Norfolk on 2 May 1919.

== Decommissioning and disposal ==
Naiwa she was decommissioned on 9 May 1919 and returned to the U.S. Shipping Board the same day. She remained in the custody of the Shipping Board as SS Naiwa until she was scrapped in 1929.
