= USS Northampton (SP-670) =

Patrol vessel of the United States Navy

History

United States
- Name: USS Northampton
- Namesake: Northampton, Massachusetts, the ship's previous name retained
- Builder: Wilson, Birdsnest, Virginia
- Acquired: 5 May 1917
- Fate: Returned to owner 19 December 1918

General characteristics
- Type: Wooden motor boat
- Length: 38 ft (12 m)
- Beam: 11 ft (3.4 m)
- Draft: 2 ft (0.61 m)
- Speed: 8 knots (14.8 km/h)
- Armament: 1 × 1-pounder gun

The first USS Northampton (SP-670), was a wooden motor boat acquired by the United States Navy for patrol duty during World War I.

Northampton was built by Wilson of Birdsnest, Virginia, and was acquired by the U.S. Navy on free lease from John A. Parsons of Norfolk, Virginia, on 5 May 1917.

Northampton was assigned to the 5th Naval District. She operated on section patrol until returned to her owner on 19 December 1918.
