= USS Nokomis =

USS Nokomis may refer to:

- USS Nokomis (SP-609), served the US Navy as a patrol craft during World War I
- USS Nokomis (YT-142), a tugboat in service from 1940 to 1974
