= USS Ottawa =

Ottawa is a name used by the US Navy twice:

- USS Ottawa (1861), was a gunboat during the American Civil War
- USS Ottawa (AKA-101), was a Tolland-class attack cargo ship commissioned 8 February 1945 and decommissioned 10 January 1947
