= USS Niagara (SP-246) =

Patrol vessel of the United States Navy

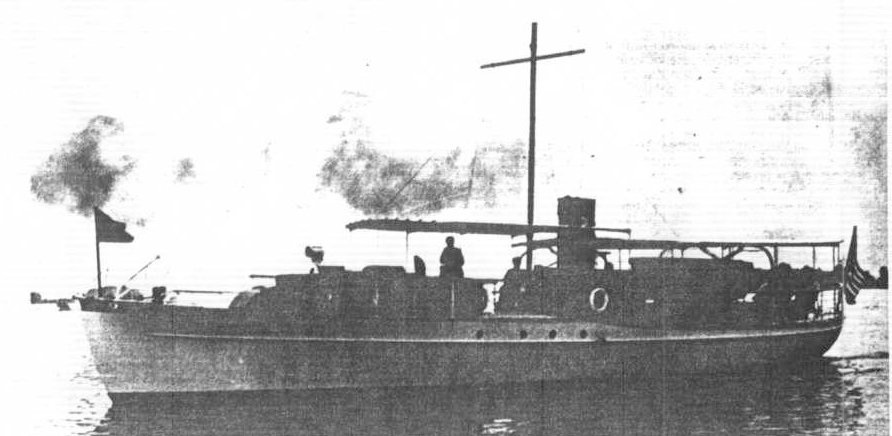

History

United States
- Name: USS Niagara
- Namesake: Fort Niagara
- Builder: Matthews Boat Company, Port Clinton, Ohio
- Completed: 1913
- Acquired: 9 June 1917
- Commissioned: 9 June 1917
- Fate: Returned to owner 20 March 1919

General characteristics
- Type: Motor boat
- Displacement: 46 tons
- Length: 80 ft 6 in (24.54 m)
- Beam: 14 ft 4 in (4.37 m)
- Draft: 4 ft 6 in (1.37 m)
- Speed: 12 knots (22 km/h)
- Complement: 11
- Armament: 1 × 3-pounder gun; 1 × 1-pounder gun; 2 × machine guns

The fourth USS Niagara (SP-246) was a motor boat that served in the United States Navy during World War I.

Niagara was built by Matthews Boat Company at Port Clinton, Ohio, in 1913. She was acquired by the U.S. Navy on lease from Lawrence D. Buhl of Detroit, Michigan, on 9 June 1917 for service in World War I, and was commissioned the same day.

Niagara served as a motor patrol boat in the 9th Naval District until returned to her owner on 20 March 1919.
