= USS Nyack =

USS Nyack has been the name of two ships in the United States Navy. The name "Nyack" is taken from Nyack, a village in Rockland County, New York, which derives its name from the Indian word meaning "point" or "corner".

- USS Nyack (1863), a wooden-hulled screw gunboat, served in the Union during the American Civil War.
- USS Nyack (YT-19), was renamed from Tug Sioux to Nyack on 20 February 1918.
