= USS Observer =

USS Observer is a name used more than once by the U.S. Navy:

- USS Observer (AMc-91), a coastal minesweeper laid down 6 September 1941.
- USS Observer (MSO-461), a minesweeper laid down 20 July 1953.
