= USS Nabigwon =

Tugboat of the United States Navy

History

United States
- Name: USS Nabigwon
- Builder: Gibbs Gas Engine Co., Jacksonville, Florida
- Laid down: 28 February 1945
- Launched: 1 June 1945
- Commissioned: 22 October 1945
- Reclassified: YTM-521, February 1962
- Fate: Sold for scrapping, 28 July 1987

General characteristics
- Type: Tugboat
- Displacement: 237 long tons (241 t)
- Length: 100 ft (30 m)
- Beam: 25 ft (7.6 m)
- Draft: 11 ft 6 in (3.51 m)
- Speed: 12 knots (22 km/h; 14 mph)
- Complement: 8

USS Nabigwon (YTB-521/YTM-521) was a Hisada-class harbor tug in the service of the United States Navy. The name "Nabigwon" is taken from a Native American language, meaning "ship".

Nabigwon was assigned advanced base duty in the Pacific. In addition to towing and berthing services, she provided harbor fire protection and was utilized as an inner harbor patrol craft. Redesignated YTM in February 1962, Nabigwon remained active as a medium harbor tug at Pearl Harbor into the 1970s.

Nabigwon was sold by the Defense Reutilization and Marketing Service (DRMS) for scrapping on 28 July 1987.
