= USS Nedeva II =

Patrol vessel of the United States Navy

History

United States
- Name: USS Nedeva II
- Namesake: Previous name retained
- Builder: Essington Shipbuilding Company, Essington, Pennsylvania
- Completed: 1917
- Acquired: 10 April 1917
- Commissioned: 10 April 1917
- Decommissioned: After World War I
- Fate: Returned to owner
- Notes: In use as private motorboat Nedeva II in 1917 and after World War I

General characteristics
- Type: Patrol vessel
- Displacement: 18 tons
- Length: 60 ft (18 m)
- Beam: 10 ft 10 in (3.30 m)
- Draft: 1 ft 2 in (0.36 m)
- Speed: 12 knots
- Armament: 1 × 1-pounder gun

USS Nedeva II (SP-64) was an armed motorboat that served in the United States Navy as a patrol vessel from 1917 until after the end of World War I.

Nedeva II was built as a private motorboat of the same name in 1917 by Essington Shipbuilding Company at Essington, Pennsylvania. The U.S. Navy acquired her for World War I service as a patrol vessel from her owner, J. H. H. Cromwell of Philadelphia, Pennsylvania, on 10 April 1917 and commissioned her the same day as USS Nedeva II (SP-64) with Cromwell in command.

Operating in the 4th Naval District headquartered at Philadelphia, Nedeva II patrolled in the Philadelphia area, protecting shipping in the Delaware River. After wartime service, she was decommissioned and returned to her owner.
