= USS Okisko =

Decommissioned United States Navy ship

History

United States
- Name: USS Okisko
- Launched: 1939
- Acquired: 29 October 1940
- Commissioned: 19 December 1940
- Decommissioned: 21 February 1947
- Out of service: 1947
- Stricken: 8 May 1947
- Identification: Ship International Radio Callsign: NILM

General characteristics
- Length: 63 feet
- Beam: 16 feet 6 inches
- Draft: 7 feet 6 inches
- Speed: 10 Knots
- Complement: 7

USS Okisko was a Small Steam Harbor Tug in service with the United States Navy from 1940 to 1947.

Built in 1939 as the Tugboat Cornelius Kroll, she was purchased from Terry Dalehite Towing Co. on 29 October 1940 by the U.S. Navy, renamed USS Okisko (YN-42), and converted for naval service at Naval Station New Orleans. She entered service on 19 December 1940 as a boom (net) tender. Allocated to the 6th Naval District, on 8 April 1942 Okisko was reclassified to be considered a net tender (tug class). In 1944, she was assigned to the 8th Naval District in 1944. On 2 August 1945, her classification was changed to little harbor tug, and her hull number was changed to YLT-735. Okisko was decommissioned on 21 February 1947. After being struck from the naval register, on 8 May 1947, she made a return to civilian life, as the Tug Wilcox of the Wilcox Floating Equipment Co. Over 20 years later, she was purchased by the Reinauer Transportation Co., of Staten Island, New York whilst retaining her name. Her fate is unknown.

== Ship names and designations ==
Over the years, Okisko has enjoyed a variety of names, including;

- Cornelius Kroll 1939–1940
- USS Okisko YN-42 29 October 1940 – 8 April 1942
- USS Okisko YNT-10 8 April 1942 – 2 August 1945
- USS Okisko YTL-735 2 August 1945 – 8 May 1947
- Wilcox

== Ship Awards ==

- American Defense Service Medal
- American Campaign Medal
- World War II Victory Medal
