= USS Niagara (SP-263) =

Patrol vessel of the United States Navy

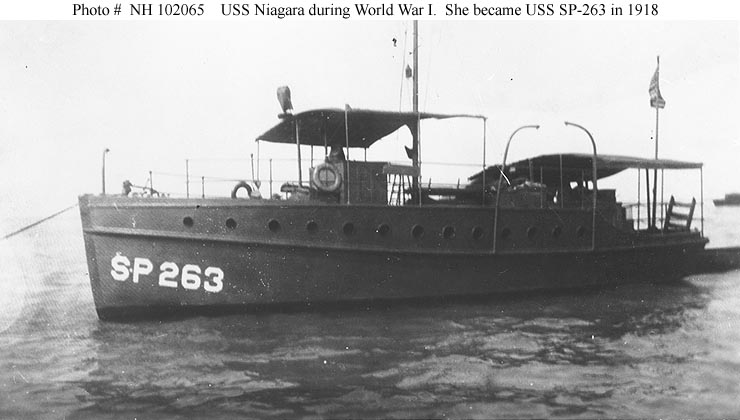
- USS Niagara (SP-263)

History

United States
- Name: USS Niagara
- Builder: E. A. Fonda, Miami, Florida
- Launched: 1915
- Acquired: 5 July 1917
- Fate: Transferred to the United States Lighthouse Service, 29 May 1919

United States
- Name: USLHT Poinsettia
- Acquired: 29 May 1919
- Decommissioned: 21 April 1922
- Fate: Sold, 1922; Caught fire and sank, 27 December 1928

General characteristics
- Type: Patrol boat / Lighthouse tender
- Displacement: 33 long tons (34 t)
- Length: 50 ft (15 m)
- Beam: 16 ft (4.9 m)
- Draft: 2 ft 9 in (0.84 m)
- Propulsion: 50 hp (37 kW) gasoline engine, one shaft
- Speed: 10.4 knots (19.3 km/h; 12.0 mph)
- Complement: 5
- Armament: 1 × 1-pounder gun; 1 × machine gun

USS Niagara (SP-263) was a vessel of the United States Navy during World War I.

Niagara, a yacht built in 1915 by E. A. Fonda of Miami, Florida, was purchased by the United States Navy on 5 July 1917 from General H. M. Creel, of Miami, and was designated USS Niagara (SP-263). The navy redesignated the boat as SP-263 on 11 April 1918, dropping the name Niagara.

After the war, on 29 May 1919, she was transferred to the United States Lighthouse Service, converted into a lighthouse tender and rechristened USLHT Poinsettia. She was assigned to the 7th Lighthouse District in Key West, Florida.

Poinsettia was decommissioned on 21 April 1922 at the Philadelphia Navy Yard and was sold. She caught fire and sank on 27 December 1928.
