= USS Nottoway =

USS Nottoway may refer to the following ships operated by the United States Navy:

- USS Accomac (YTL-18), a district harbor tugboat, which bore the name Nottoway for a time
- USS Nottoway (ATA-183), a Sotoyomo-class tugboat launched in 1944 and struck in 1962
