= USS Naushon =

Patrol vessel of the United States Navy

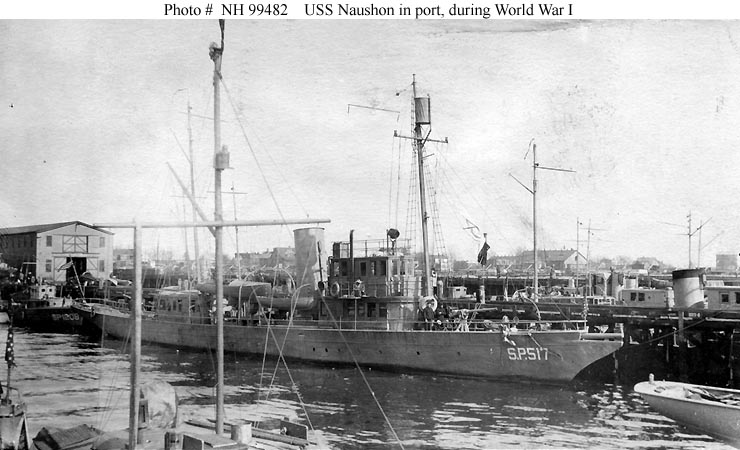
- USS Naushon (SP-517) in port, ca. 1918. The patrol vessel USS Ocoee (SP-1208) is astern of her.

History

United States
- Name: USS Naushon
- Namesake: Previous name retained
- Builder: Delaware River Iron Ship Building and Engine Works, Chester, Pennsylvania
- Completed: 1895
- Acquired: 31 August 1917
- Commissioned: 21 February 1918
- Stricken: 13 June 1919
- Fate: Sold 17 November 1920
- Notes: Operated as private yacht Oneonota, Norman and Naushon 1895-1917

General characteristics
- Type: Patrol vessel
- Tonnage: 135 gross register tons
- Length: 154 ft 3 in (47.02 m)
- Beam: 18 ft 5 in (5.61 m)
- Draft: 7 ft 6 in (2.29 m)
- Propulsion: Steam engine
- Speed: 13 knots
- Complement: 75
- Armament: 2 × 6-pounder guns; 2 × .30-caliber (7.62-mm) machine guns

USS Naushon (SP-517) was a United States Navy patrol vessel in commission from 1918 to 1919.

Naushon was built in 1895 as the private steel-hulled steam yacht Oneonota by Delaware River Iron Ship Building and Engine Works at Chester, Pennsylvania. She later was renamed Norman and then Naushon.

On 31 August 1917, the U.S. Navy acquired Naushon from her owner, J. Shewan of Brooklyn, New York, for use as a section patrol vessel during World War I. She was commissioned as USS Naushon (SP-517) on 21 February 1918.

Assigned to the 7th Naval District, Naushon served on patrol duty along the United States Gulf Coast for the remainder of World War I.

Decommissioned after World War I, Naushon was stricken from the Naval Register on 13 June 1919. She was sold to Jose Frauquia & Company of Tampa, Florida, on 17 November 1920.
