= USS Napa =

USS Napa may refer to the following ships operated by the United States Navy:

- USS Napa (1864), a non-commissioned Union ship in the American Civil War
- USS Napa (AT-32), a Bagaduce-class ocean tug; scuttled by her crew in the Philippines on 9 April 1942.
- USS Napa (APR-10), assigned 23 August 1942; contract for construction of the rescue vessel was cancelled 12 March 1943
- USS Napa (APA-157), a Haskell-class attack transport which served in World War II during 1944–1945.
