= USS Neches =

Ship name

USS Neches may refer to the following ships operated by the United States Navy:

- USS Neches (AO-5), a U.S. Navy fleet replenishment oiler; launched in 1920 and sunk by the Japanese, 23 January 1942
- USS Neches (AO-47), a U.S. Navy fleet replenishment oiler; launched in 1942 and scrapped in 1973
- USNS Neches (T-AO-183), a tanker leased by the U.S. Navy; launched in 1971 and scrapped in 1983
