= USS Natoya =

Patrol vessel of the United States Navy

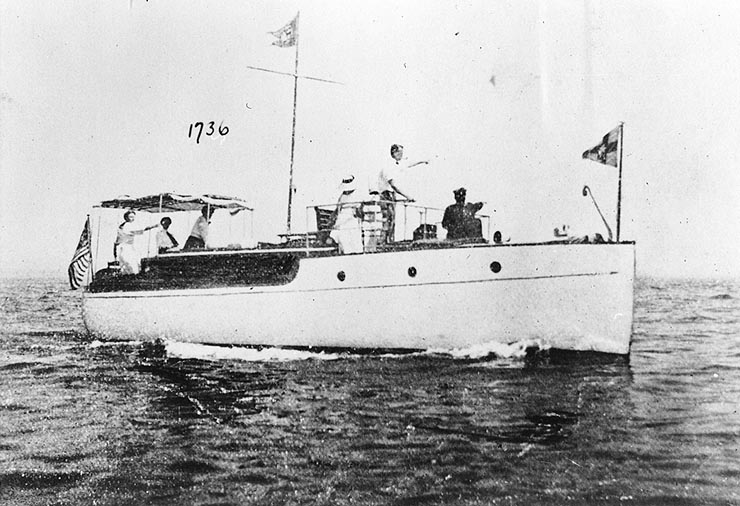
- Natoya as a private motorboat sometime between 1909 and 1917.

History

United States
- Name: USS Natoya
- Namesake: Previous name retained
- Completed: 1909
- Acquired: 11 June 1917
- Commissioned: 11 June 1917 or 19 June 1917
- Decommissioned: 11 January 1918
- Recommissioned: 18 May 1918
- Decommissioned: 18 December 1918
- Fate: Transferred to U.S. Customs Service 3 April 1919 or 12 April 1919
- Notes: Operated as private motorboat Natoya 1909-1917

General characteristics
- Type: Patrol vessel
- Tonnage: 12 gross register tons
- Length: 44 ft 6 in (13.56 m)
- Beam: 9 ft 7 in (2.92 m)
- Draft: 4 ft (1.2 m)
- Speed: 10 knots
- Complement: 9
- Armament: 1 × 1-pounder gun

USS Natoya (SP-396) was a United States Navy patrol vessel in commission from 1917 to 1919.

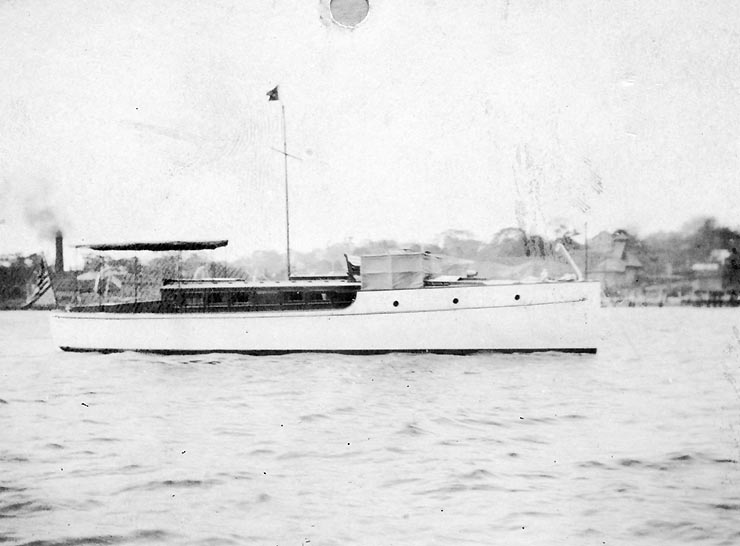
Natoya as a private motorboat sometime between 1909 and 1917.

Natoya was built as a private motorboat in 1909. On 11 June 1917, the U.S. Navy acquired her from her owner, R. M. Haddock of Ossining, New York, for use as a section patrol boat during World War I. She was commissioned at New York City as USS Natoya (SP-391) on either 11 June 1917 or 19 June 1917.

Natoya served on patrol duties in New York Harbor. She was decommissioned on 11 January 1918 to undergo repairs. After their completion, she was recommissioned on 18 May 1918 and resumed her patrol duties for the remainder of World War I.

Natoya was decommissioned for the second and last time on 18 December 1918. On either 3 April 1919 or 12 April 1919, she was transferred to the United States Department of the Treasury for use by the United States Customs Service.
