= USS Octorara =

USS Octorara is a name used more than once by the U.S. Navy:

- USS Octorara (1861), a steamer in the Union Navy during the American Civil War.
- USS Octorara (IX-139), a tanker built in 1921.
