= USS Oneyana =

Tugboat of the United States Navy

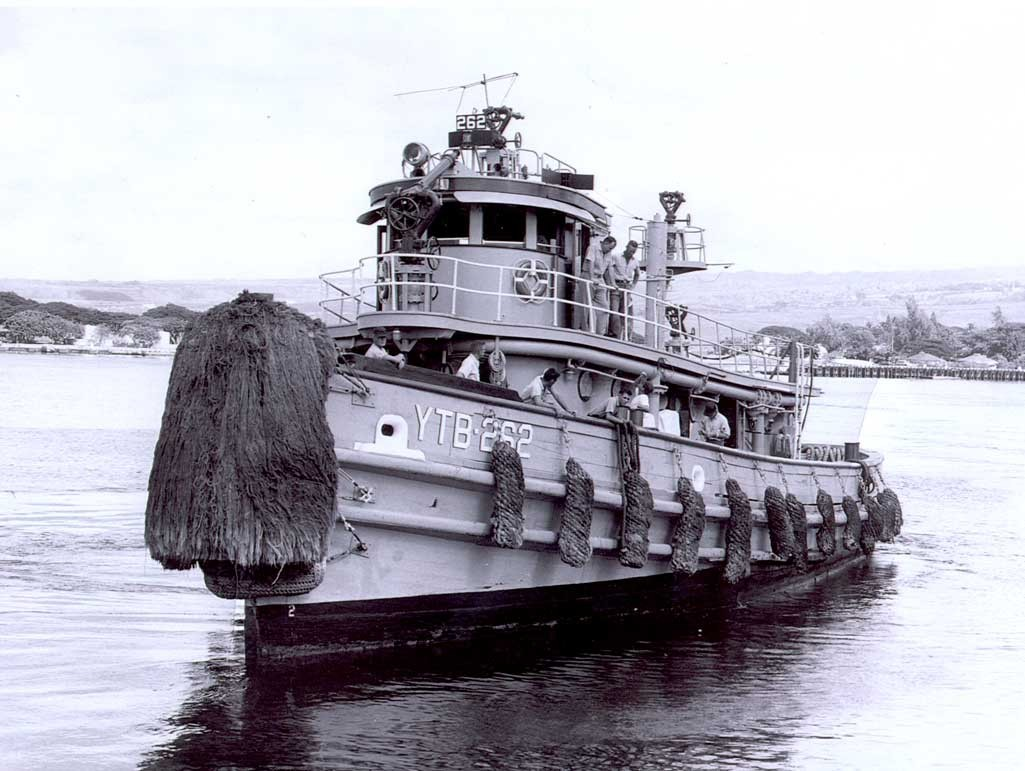
- USS Oneyana (YTB-262) underway, probably at Pearl Harbor, circa 1960-61.

History

United States
- Name: USS Oneyana (YTB-262)
- Builder: J.M. Martinac Shipbuilding Corp., Tacoma, Washington
- Laid down: 20 June 1943
- Launched: 27 March 1944
- Out of service: 1962
- Reclassified: District Harbor Tug, Large YTB-262 15 May 1944; District Harbor Tug (Medium) YTM-262 in February 1962
- Stricken: 1962
- Fate: Authorized for disposal in August 1963 final fate, unknown

General characteristics
- Class & type: Cahto-class district harbor tug
- Displacement: 410 long tons (417 t)
- Length: 110 ft 0 in (33.53 m)
- Beam: 27 ft 0 in (8.23 m)
- Draft: 11 ft 4 in (3.45 m)
- Speed: 12 knots (22 km/h; 14 mph)
- Complement: 12
- Armament: 2 × .50-caliber machine guns

USS Oneyana (YTB-262) was a U.S. Navy tugboat laid down as YT–262, 20 June 1943 at J.M. Martinac Shipbuilding Corp., Tacoma, Washington launched 27 March 1944; reclassified YTB 262, 15 May 1944: and placed in service 23 August 1944.

== Service life ==
After sea trials Oneyana departed the West Coast for duty under the Commandant, 14th Naval District. As a harbor tug she assisted the larger naval vessels in docking and berthing at Pearl Harbor and executed towing missions throughout the Hawaiian Islands for over 17 years. Redesignated YTM–262 in February 1962 she was shortly thereafter struck from the Naval Register and authorized for disposal in August 1963.
