= USS Negwagon =

USS Negwagon may refer to two ships operated by the United States Navy:

- USS Negwagon (YT-188) was a tugboat acquired by the U.S. Navy in 1943
- Negwagon (YTB-834) was a tugboat acquired by the U.S. Navy in 1975
