= USS Nahasho =

Tugboat of the United States Navy

History

United States
- Name: USS Nahasho
- Builder: Consolidated Shipbuilding Corp., Morris Heights, New York
- Laid down: 14 November 1944
- Launched: 14 February 1945
- Commissioned: 30 July 1945
- Reclassified: YTM–535, February 1962
- Status: Unknown
- Notes: Was still active in 1970

General characteristics
- Type: Tugboat
- Displacement: 237 long tons (241 t)
- Length: 100 ft (30 m)
- Beam: 25 ft (7.6 m)
- Draft: 11 ft 6 in (3.51 m)
- Speed: 12 knots (22 km/h; 14 mph)
- Complement: 8

USS Nahasho (YTB-535/YTM-535) was a Hisada-class tug boat. Its name comes from a Navajo word meaning “it is damp.”

Assigned to the 1st Fleet, Nahasho operated in Hawaiian waters until placed out of service, in reserve, at Pearl Harbor in November 1947. Reactivated in June 1949, she was transferred to the east coast to serve the 5th Naval District, headquartered at Norfolk. Redesignated YTM–535 in February 1962, Nahasho continued, into 1970, to render towing, fire fighting and other services of her type to naval vessels and commands in the Tide Water region of Virginia.
