= USS Natick =

USS Natick may refer to the following ships of the United States Navy:

- USS Agawam (SP-570), was renamed USS Natick (SP-570) in 1917
- Natick (YTB-760), a tugboat acquired by the U.S. Navy in 1961
