= USS Nahoke =

Tugboat of the United States Navy

History

United States
- Name: USS Nahoke
- Builder: Consolidated Shipbuilding Corp., Morris Heights, New York
- Laid down: 4 December 1944
- Launched: 27 March 1945
- Commissioned: 11 August 1945
- Reclassified: YTM–536, February 1962
- Status: Unknown
- Notes: Was still active in 1970

General characteristics
- Type: Tugboat
- Displacement: 237 long tons (241 t)
- Length: 100 ft (30 m)
- Beam: 25 ft (7.6 m)
- Draft: 11 ft 6 in (3.51 m)
- Speed: 12 knots (22 km/h; 14 mph)
- Complement: 8

USS Nahoke (YTB-536/YTM-536) was a Hisada-class tugboat built during World War II. The Nahoke gets its name from a Navajo word meaning “the land in distinction to water.”

The Nahoke was laid down by the Consolidated Shipbuilding Corp., Morris Heights, New York. She was assigned to the 15th Naval District, operated in the Panama Canal Zone until transferred to the 5th Naval District. She was headquartered at Norfolk, in the spring of 1961. In February 1962, the Nahoke was redesignated YTM–536, and continued, into 1970, to provide vital tug services to naval vessels and commands in the Chesapeake Bay area.
