= USS Nacheninga =

Tugboat of the United States Navy

History

United States
- Name: USS Nacheninga
- Builder: Consolidated Shipbuilding Corp., Morris Heights, New York
- Laid down: February 1945
- Launched: 16 May 1945
- Reclassified: YTM-520, 1954
- Stricken: 1967
- Fate: Sold

General characteristics
- Type: Tugboat
- Displacement: 237 long tons (241 t)
- Length: 100 ft (30 m)
- Beam: 25 ft (7.6 m)
- Draft: 11 ft 6 in (3.51 m)
- Speed: 12 knots (22 km/h; 14 mph)
- Complement: 8

USS Nacheninga (YTB-520) was a Hisada-class harbor tug in the service of the United States Navy. She operated mainly in Pearl Harbor, providing assistance in the vicinity of anchorages and piers for berthing and docking evolutions. She also provided towing services, waterfront fire protection, and served as an inner harbor patrol craft.

In the late 1940s, she was temporarily declared inactive, out of service, but resumed duties shortly thereafter. From 1951, she continued to operate in the 14th Naval District, Pearl Harbor. Redesignated YTM-520 in 1954, she served as an activity craft at Pearl Harbor through 1967, when she was struck from the Naval Register and sold.
