= USCGC Northland =

There have been several USCGC (United States Coast Guard Cutter) named Northland:

- USCGC Northland (WPG-49) served in the U.S. Coast Guard from 1927–1946. She was designed for Arctic patrol and served in World War II.
- USCGC Northland (WMEC-904), is a medium endurance cutter based out of Portsmouth, Virginia.
