= USS Nereus =

USS Nereus may refer to the following ships of the United States Navy:

- USS Nereus (1863), an American Civil War steamer
- USS Nereus (AC-10), a Proteus-class collier
- USS Nereus (AS-17), a Fulton-class submarine tender
