= USS Owl =

USS Owl may refer to the following ships of the United States Navy:

- USS Owl (AM-2), laid down 25 October 1917 by the Todd Shipbuilding Corp., Brooklyn, New York.
- USS Owl (AMCU-35), originally laid down as LCI(L)-982 on 23 March 1944 by Consolidated Steel Corp., Orange, Texas.
