= USS Narwhal =

USS Narwhal has been the name of more than one United States Navy ship, and may refer to:

- USS Narwhal, a submarine renamed USS D-1 (SS-17) in 1911, in commission from 1909 to 1922
- USS Narwhal (SS-167), a submarine in commission from 1930 to 1945, named USS V-1 (SS-167) from 1930 to 1931
- USS Narwhal (SSN-671), a submarine in commission from 1969 to 1999
