= USS Nodaway =

USS Nodaway may refer to:

- USS Nodaway (AOG-67), was a gasoline tanker launched in 1945 and eventually acquired by Sun Oil
- USNS Nodaway (T-AOG-78), was a gasoline tanker launched in 1945 as MV Tarcoola
