= USS Navigator =

USS Navigator may refer to the following ships of the United States Navy:

- USS Navigator (YTB-39) a harbor tugboat built in 1898 and struck in 1946
- USS Navigator (ATA-203) a Sotoyomo-class tugboat built in 1944 and struck in 1962.
