= USS Needlefish =

USS Needlefish has been the name of more than one United States Navy ship, and may refer to:

- USS Needlefish (SS-379), a submarine cancelled in July 1944 before she was laid down
- USS Needlefish (SS-493), a submarine cancelled in August 1945 before she was laid down
- A fictitious USS Needlefish is mentioned in Edward L. Beach's novel Run Silent, Run Deep.
