= USS New Bedford (PF-71) =

Tacoma-class patrol frigate

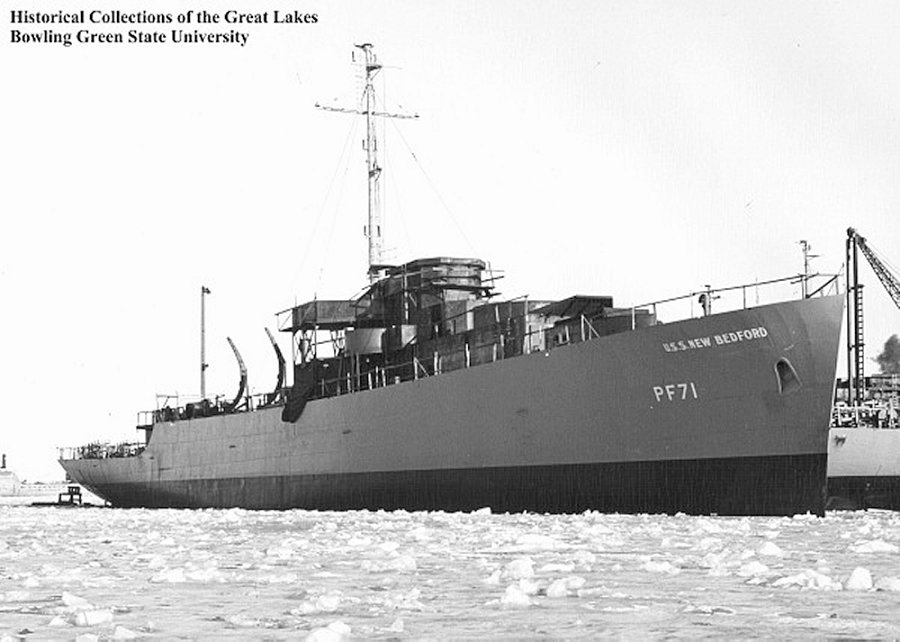
- USS New Bedford (PF-71)

History

United States
- Name: New Bedford
- Namesake: City of New Bedford, Massachusetts
- Builder: Leathem D. Smith Shipbuilding Company, Sturgeon Bay, Wisconsin
- Laid down: 2 October 1943
- Launched: 29 December 1943
- Commissioned: 18 November 1944
- Decommissioned: 24 May 1946
- Fate: Sold for scrap, 16 November 1947

General characteristics
- Class & type: Tacoma-class frigate
- Displacement: 1,430 long tons (1,453 t) light; 2,415 long tons (2,454 t) full
- Length: 303 ft 11 in (92.63 m)
- Beam: 37 ft 6 in (11.43 m)
- Draft: 13 ft 8 in (4.17 m)
- Propulsion: 2 × 5,500 shp (4,101 kW) turbines; 3 boilers; 2 shafts
- Speed: 20 knots (37 km/h; 23 mph)
- Complement: 190
- Armament: 3 × 3"/50 dual purpose guns (3x1); 4 x 40 mm guns (2×2); 9 × 20 mm guns (9×1); 1 × Hedgehog anti-submarine mortar; 8 × K-gun depth charge projectors; 2 × Depth charge tracks

USS New Bedford (PF-71), a Tacoma-class frigate, was the first ship of the United States Navy to be named for New Bedford, Massachusetts.

== Construction ==
New Bedford (PF-71) was built by the Leathem D. Smith Shipbuilding Company of Sturgeon Bay, Wisconsin, and was launched there on 29 December 1943. She was sponsored by four-year old Cynthia Zeilinski, who at the time was believed to be the youngest sponsor of a fighting ship. New Bedford was towed down the Mississippi River and ferried to Houston, Texas, for completion and fitting out. She was commissioned 18 November 1944.

== Service history ==
She proceeded to Bermuda on 6 December 1944, for a month's shakedown exercises, returning to Philadelphia on 12 January 1945 for post-shakedown availability.

Departing New York on 6 February 1945, New Bedford proceeded to Oran escorting her first trans-Atlantic convoy which put safely into Oran on 23 February. On 3 March the frigate joined the anti-submarine screen of a west bound convoy, arriving Boston 20 March. She next sailed to Hampton Roads, Virginia, to pick up an east bound convoy. She departed Hampton Roads 8 April and arrived at Oran on 24 April. She made her final westbound passage on 2 May and arrived at Boston, Massachusetts, on 19 May. She was then converted for duty as a weather ship while on an availability that lasted until 31 July 1945.

She was assigned to weather patrol in the Pacific and sailed from Boston on 31 July. The war ended as she was en route from the Panama Canal Zone to Pearl Harbor, where she arrived on 27 August 1945. Three days later she departed for Guam. For the next six months, New Bedford stood regular weather station patrols, returning to Guam, her home base, only long enough to fuel, provision, and afford a period of recreation for the crew. The weather patrols were, for the most part, dull and tiring. Violent tropical storms sometimes beat her unmercifully as she stood her station. Once a Japanese destroyer on a peaceful repatriation mission was sighted.

The frigate arrived at San Francisco, California, on 10 March 1946, and then proceeded to Seattle, Washington. She was decommissioned there on 24 May 1946.
