= USS Onward II =

Patrol vessel of the United States Navy

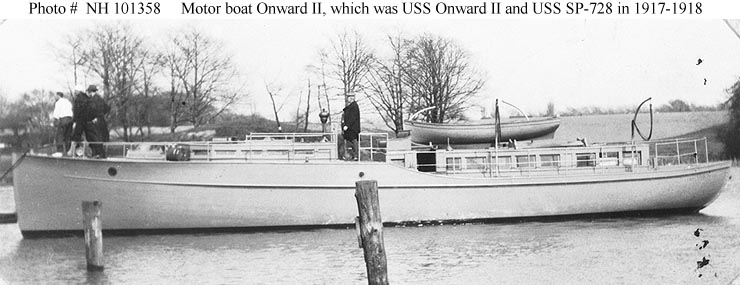
- Onward II as a private motorboat prior to her U.S. Navy service.

History

United States
- Name: USS Onward II (1917-1918); USS SP-728 (1918)
- Namesake: Onward II was her previous name retained; SP-728 was her section patrol number
- Builder: Defoe Boat and Motor Works, Bay City, Michigan
- Acquired: 23 June 1917
- Commissioned: 25 June 1917
- Fate: Returned to owner 2 December 1918
- Notes: Served as civilian motorboat Onward II until 1917 and from December 1918

General characteristics
- Type: Patrol vessel
- Tonnage: 14 tons
- Length: 60 ft (18 m)
- Beam: 11 ft 6 in (3.51 m)
- Draft: 3 ft (0.91 m) mean
- Speed: 9 knots
- Complement: 11
- Armament: 1 × 1-pounder guns; 1 × machine gun

USS Onward II (SP-728), later USS SP-728, was an armed motorboat that served in the United States Navy as a patrol vessel from 1917 to 1918.

Onward II was built as a civilian motorboat of the same name by Defoe Boat and Motor Works at Bay City, Michigan. The U.S. Navy acquired her from her owner, W. S. Forsythe, on 23 June 1917 for World War I service as a patrol vessel and commissioned her on 25 June 1917 as USS Onward II (SP-728).

For the rest of World War I, Onward II performed routine harbor patrol duties at Newport, Rhode Island. In 1918 she was renamed USS SP-728.

SP-728 was returned to her owner on 2 December 1918.

Onward II should not be confused with the patrol vessel USS Onward (SP-311), in commission from 1917 to 1919.
