= USS Noble (1861) =

USS Noble (1861) was a wooden bark purchased during the American Civil War by the Union Navy 2 December 1861 at Sag Harbor, New York.

Noble was selected to be used as part of the obstructions placed in the "Stone Fleet" – a fleet of hulks sunk in selected waterways of the Confederate States of America to prevent passage of ships.

She was sunk in a channel leading to Savannah, Georgia, early in 1862.

== See also ==
- Union Blockade
