= USS Orvetta (1861) =

Gunboat of the United States Navy

History

United States
- Acquired: 1 October 1861
- Commissioned: 27 January 1862
- Decommissioned: 3 July 1865
- Fate: Sold, 15 August 1865

General characteristics
- Displacement: 199 tons
- Length: 93 ft (28 m)
- Beam: 27 ft 2 in (8.28 m)
- Depth of hold: 7 ft 10 in (2.39 m)
- Propulsion: sail
- Speed: 11 knots (20 km/h; 13 mph)
- Complement: 37
- Armament: 2 × 32-pounder guns; 1 × 13" mortar; 2 × 12-pounder smoothbores

USS Orvetta was a schooner acquired by the Union Navy during the American Civil War. She was used by the Navy to patrol navigable waterways of the Confederacy to prevent the South from trading with other countries.

== Service history ==
Orvetta was purchased by the Navy at New York City 1 October 1861 from E. & D. Bigelow, agents; and commissioned at New York Navy Yard 27 January 1862, Acting Master Francis E. Blanchard in command. One of 21 schooners fitted out with mortars for a bomb flotilla organized by Comdr. David Dixon Porter to support Flag Officer David Farragut's deep draft ships in their attack on New Orleans, Orvetta sailed down the Atlantic coast, across the Gulf of Mexico, and into the Mississippi River through Pass a l'Outre below Fort St. Philip and Fort Jackson, 18 April 1862. Orvetta and her sister schooners opened fire and maintained the barrage on the Confederate fortifications until the 24th when Farragut's salt water ships passed the forts. The next day New Orleans, Louisiana, surrendered. The schooner subsequently supported operations in the Mississippi River, especially against Vicksburg and served in the Gulf of Mexico. After the war she decommissioned at New York City 3 July 1865 and was sold at auction there to a Mr. Henseman 15 August 1865. Her mortar is now a memorial in Bristol, New Hampshire.

== See also ==
- Union Blockade
