= USS Naugatuck (YTM–753) =

Tugboat of the United States Navy

History

United States
- Name: USS Naugatuck
- Namesake: An Indian word meaning "one tree" or "fork of the river."
- Builder: Higgins Industries, New Orleans, Louisiana
- Laid down: date unknown
- Launched: 1953
- In service: 21 January 1963
- Out of service: date unknown
- Identification: IMO number: 8728165
- Fate: Scrapped 1974

General characteristics
- Type: tugboat
- Displacement: 295 tons
- Length: 107 ft (33 m)
- Beam: 27 ft (8.2 m)
- Draft: 12 ft (3.7 m)
- Speed: 12 knots
- Crew: 10 crew members

USS Naugatuck (YTM-753) was a tugboat acquired by the U.S. Navy from the U.S. Army. She was assigned to harbor duty at New York City harbor.

== Acquired from the U.S. Army ==
Naugatuck – the second U.S. Navy ship to be so named—was a medium harbor tug, was taken over from the Army in 1963. Built as an Army Design 423 Large Tug by Higgins Industries, New Orleans, Louisiana, delivered February 1953, LT–1964 served the Army until acquired by the Navy in 1962, on a loan basis.

The Navy assumed permanent possession the next year, and effective 21 January 1963 the tug was named and reclassified Naugatuck (YTM–753).

== 3rd Naval District service ==
Assigned duties in the 3rd Naval District, she continued to provide services in the New York Harbor area into 1970. The ship was scrapped in 1974.
