= USS New England (SP-1222) =

Tugboat of the United States Navy

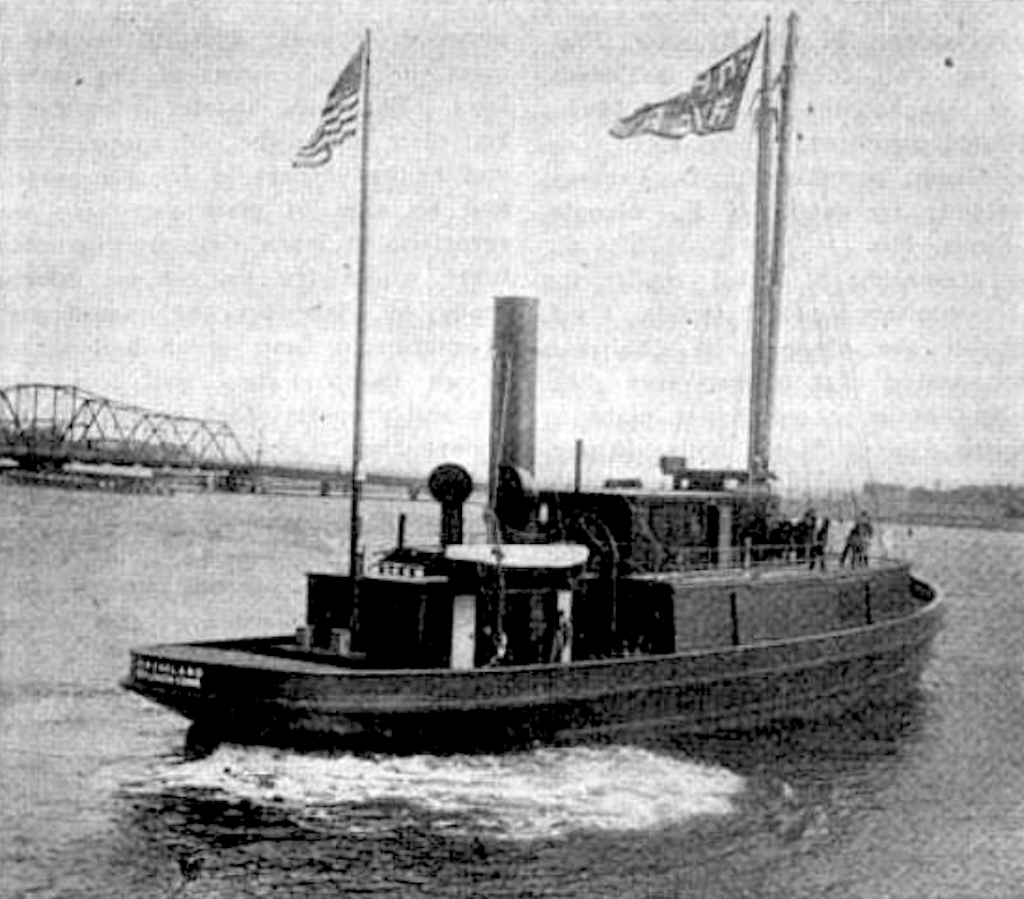
- Steam lighter New England flying Fore River pennant, probably during builder's trials.

History

United States
- Name: New England
- Namesake: Previous name retained
- Builder: Fore River Shipbuilding Company, Quincy, Massachusetts
- Completed: 1907, Delivered November 1907
- Acquired: (by Navy) 23 October 1917
- Commissioned: (by Navy) 24 October 1917
- Out of service: (Navy) 11 May 1919
- Fate: Returned to owner 11 May 1919
- Notes: Commercial steam lighter New England 1907–1917 and from 1919

General characteristics
- Type: Tug
- Tonnage: 417 GRT
- Displacement: 579 tons
- Length: 130 ft (39.6 m) LOA
- Beam: (extreme) 31 ft 6 in (9.6 m)
- Draft: 9 ft 4 in (2.84 m)
- Speed: 8.25 knots

The second USS New England (SP-1222) was operated as a United States Navy tug in commission from 1917 to 1919. New England was built as a steel steam lighter by the Fore River Shipbuilding Company at Quincy, Massachusetts, for the New England Steamship Company of New York City.

== Construction ==
The construction contract for the lighter intended for service in Boston harbor, but shortly after trials diverted to New Bedford, was let on 5 March 1907 and builder's trials completed in October with construction having been completed six weeks before stipulated.

The lighter was 130 feet (39.6 m) in length overall with an extreme beam of 31 feet 6 inches (9.6 m) and molded depth at center of 13 feet 6 inches (4.1 m) with tonnage at 417 GRT, though an earlier, pre trial description gave 450 GRT. The foremast was of a single Oregon pine 68 feet (20.7 m) at the truck with a 55 feet (16.8 m) boom served by a twin drum hoisting system, all designed for 7 ton capacity.

A 7 feet 6 inches (2.3 m) four-bladed propeller with 10 feet 6 inches (3.2 m) pitch, was driven by a direct drive engine with 26 inches (66.0 cm) cylinders with 26 inches (66.0 cm) stroke fed steam by two horizontal water tube boilers of 66 inches (167.6 cm) diameter by 14 feet (4.3 m) length. On builder's trials the lighter made 11.3 miles per hour (9.8 kn; 18.2 km/h).

Built for hard service in the port the vessel had strengthened towing bitts and ice guards and a hull with three watertight bulkheads. The deck house contained rooms for the captain and mate with a galley aft. An 8 feet 3 inches (2.5 m) square hatch was located on the foredeck for access below.

In a change of plan the lighter was to see service in New Bedford rather than Boston and on her delivery voyage met severe weather that incapacitated her engine room crew with seasickness making stops at Provincetown and Woods Hole necessary. New England was to serve as a packet boat between New Bedford and Martha's Vineyard as part of the revised duty.

== Naval service ==
On 23 October 1917, the U.S. Navy chartered her from her owner for use during World War I. She was commissioned as USS New England on 24 October 1917 designated as SP-1222. Assigned to the 2nd Naval District in southern New England and based at Newport, Rhode Island, New England operated as a tug, aiding ships arriving at and departing from Newport and ferrying supplies for the rest of World War I and into 1919.

The Navy returned New England to the New England Steamship Company on 11 May 1919.
