= USS Nettle (1862) =

Tugboat of the United States Navy

History

United States
- Acquired: 30 September 1862
- In service: 19 October 1862
- Fate: Sank, 20 October 1865

General characteristics
- Displacement: 50 tons
- Propulsion: steam engine; side wheel-propelled

USS Nettle was a steamer acquired by the Union Navy from the Union Army during the American Civil War.

She served the Navy primarily as a tugboat on the Mississippi River.

== Service history ==
Wonder, a side-wheel steamer, purchased by the Union Army early in the Civil War for service in the Western Flotilla, was transferred to the Navy 30 September 1862 and renamed Nettle 19 October 1862. Nettle, commanded by Acting Ens. Perry C. Wright, served as a tug on the Mississippi River above Vicksburg, Mississippi, until after the Confederate river fortress fell 4 July 1863. Then, based at Vicksburg, she continued supporting operations of the Mississippi Squadron maintaining Union lines of supply and communication along the inland waters of the Mississippi and its tributaries. She was sunk in a collision with an ironclad 20 October 1865.

== See also ==
- Anaconda Plan
