= USS Narkeeta (YT-133) =

Tugboat of the United States Navy

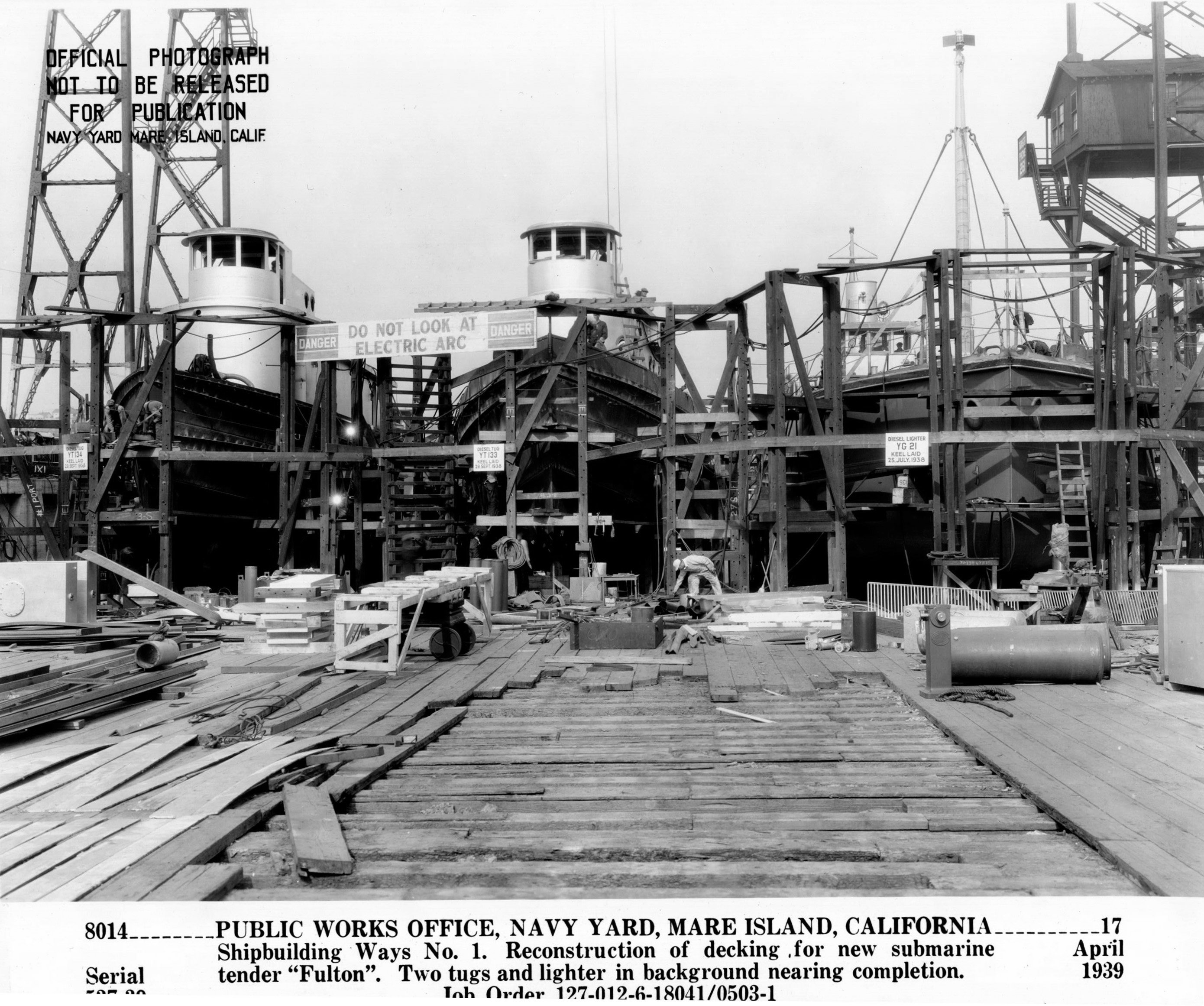
- From left to right; Wahneta (YT-134), Narkeeta (YT-133) and Self-propelled Garbage Lighter YG-21

History

United States
- Name: USS Narkeeta
- Builder: Mare Island Naval Shipyard
- Laid down: 29 September 1938
- Launched: 4 May 1939
- Commissioned: 16 June 1939
- Reclassified: YTM–133, 15 May 1944
- Stricken: 21 November 1946
- Fate: Transferred to Maritime Commission for disposal, 2 June 1947

General characteristics
- Type: Tugboat
- Displacement: 258 long tons (262 t)
- Length: 100 ft (30 m)
- Beam: 25 ft 1 in (7.65 m)
- Draft: 7 ft 9 in (2.36 m)

The second USS Narkeeta (YT-133) was a Harbor Tug, laid down on 29 September 1938 at the Naval Shipyard, Mare Island, California; launched on 4 May 1939; and placed in service on 16 June 1939.

For a little over seven years Narkeeta performed the necessary services of her type, tugging, towing, and firefighting, for the 11th Naval District. Redesignated Medium Harbor Tug, YTM–133, on 15 May 1944, she was declared surplus to Navy needs after World War II and struck from the Navy List on 21 November 1946. On 2 June 1947 she was transferred to the Maritime Commission for disposal.
