= USS Ocoee =

Patrol vessel of the United States Navy

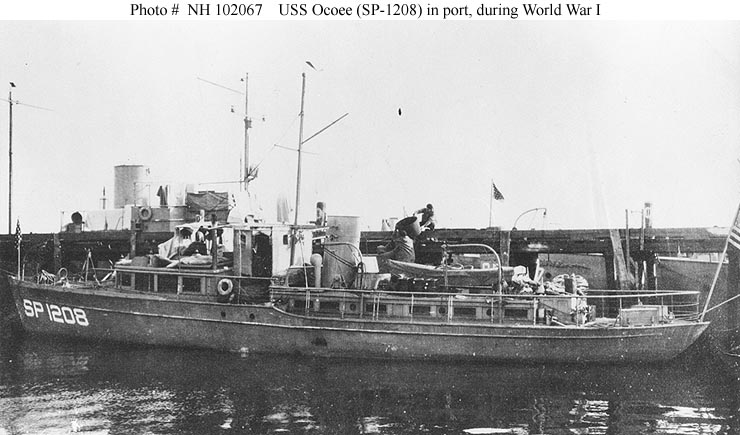
- USS Ocoee (SP-1208) in port during World War I.

History

United States
- Name: USS Ocoee
- Namesake: Previous name retained
- Builder: Matthews Boat Company, Port Clinton, Ohio
- Completed: 1911
- Acquired: 24 August 1917
- Commissioned: 17 September 1917
- Fate: Returned to owner 17 January 1919
- Notes: Operated as private motorboat Ocoee 1911-1917 and from 1919

General characteristics
- Type: Patrol vessel
- Tonnage: 29 gross register tons
- Length: 67 ft 6 in (20.57 m)
- Beam: 13 ft (4.0 m)
- Draft: 4 ft 6 in (1.37 m)
- Speed: 10 knots
- Armament: 1 × 3-pounder gun; 1 machine gun

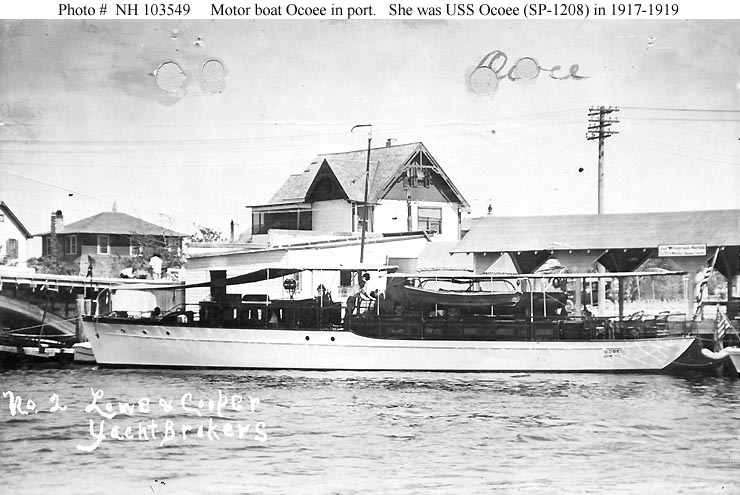
Ocoee as a private motorboat at a yachting facility sometime between 1911 and 1917.

USS Ocoee (SP-1208) was a United States Navy patrol vessel in commission from 1917 to 1918.

Ocoee was built in 1911 as a private motorboat of the same name by the Matthews Boat Building Company at Port Clinton, Ohio. On 24 August 1917, the U.S. Navy chartered her from her owner, H. Walter Blumenthal of New York City, for use as a section patrol vessel during World War I. She was commissioned as USS Ocoee (SP-1208) on 17 September 1917.

Assigned to the 3rd Naval District, Ocoee was tasked with patrol duties in the New York City area. However, on either 5 or 6 July 1918 she was reported to be unfit for naval service, and the Commandant, 3rd Naval District ordered her returned to Blumenthal. After a delay of over six months, she finally was returned to Blumenthal on 17 January 1919.
