= USS Nemesis (SP-343) =

Patrol vessel of the United States Navy

History

United States
- Name: USS Nemesis
- Namesake: Previous name retained
- Builder: G. Smith, Patchogue, New York
- Completed: 1896
- Acquired: 25 May 1917
- In service: 7 June 1917
- Fate: Returned to owner 14 December 1918
- Notes: Operated as private motorboat Nemesis 1896-1917 and from 1918

General characteristics
- Type: Patrol vessel
- Tonnage: 10 gross register tons
- Length: 41 ft 9 in (12.73 m)
- Beam: 12 ft 3 in (3.73 m)
- Draft: 2 ft 6 in (0.76 m) aft
- Speed: 6.8 knots
- Armament: one machine gun

USS Nemesis (SP-343) was a patrol vessel that served in the United States Navy from 1917 to 1918.

Nemesis was built as a private motorboat of the same name in 1896 by G. Smith at Patchogue, Long Island, New York. On 25 May 1917, the U.S. Navy acquired her under a free lease from her owner, W. L. Suyden of Else Point, Long Island, New York, for use as a patrol boat during World War I. She was placed in service as USS Nemesis (SP-343) on 7 June 1917.

Assigned to the 3rd Naval District, Nemesis served on patrol duties in the New York City area through the end of World War I. The Navy returned her to her owner on 14 December 1918.
