= Nanticoke (YTB-803) =

Tugboat of the United States Navy

History

United States
- Awarded: 4 March 1969
- Builder: Peterson Builders, Sturgeon Bay, WI
- Laid down: 26 May 1969
- Launched: 14 December 1969
- Acquired: 21 June 1970
- In service: 21 June 1970
- Stricken: 9 November 1999
- Identification: IMO number: 9068574; MMSI number: 367091120; Callsign: WDC8669
- Fate: Sold into civilian service

General characteristics
- Class & type: Natick-class large harbor tug
- Displacement: 282 long tons (287 t) (light); 341 long tons (346 t) (full)
- Length: 109 ft (33 m)
- Beam: 31 ft (9.4 m)
- Draft: 14 ft (4.3 m)
- Speed: 12 knots (14 mph; 22 km/h)
- Complement: 12
- Armament: None

Nanticoke (YTB-803) was a United States Navy Natick-class large harbor tug.

== Construction ==
The contract for Nanticoke was awarded 4 March 1969. She was laid down on 26 May 1969 at Sturgeon Bay, Wisconsin, by Peterson Builders and launched 14 December 1969.

== Operational history ==
Nanticoke was placed in service in the 12th Naval District at San Francisco in 1970.

Stricken from the Navy List 9 November 1999, Nanticoke was sold to a private concern and renamed Canal Protector. Ex-Nanticoke was subsequently resold and renamed Robert E. McAllister.
