= USS Nahma =

USS Nahma may refer to the following ships of the United States Navy:

- USS Nahma (YFB-1) was a small ferry/patrol boat that was built in 1902 and served the New Orleans area during World War I.
- USS Nahma (SP-771) was a motor patrol boat used primarily as an escort for British shipping into the Mediterranean during World War I.
