= USS Nantahala =

USS Nantahala has been the name of more than one United States Navy ship, and may refer to:

- USS Nantahala (ID-3519), a cargo ship in commission from 1918 to 1919
- USS Nantahala (AO-60), an oiler in commission from 1944 to June 1950 and from December 1950 to 1973
