= USS Narkeeta (1892) =

Tugboat of the United States Navy

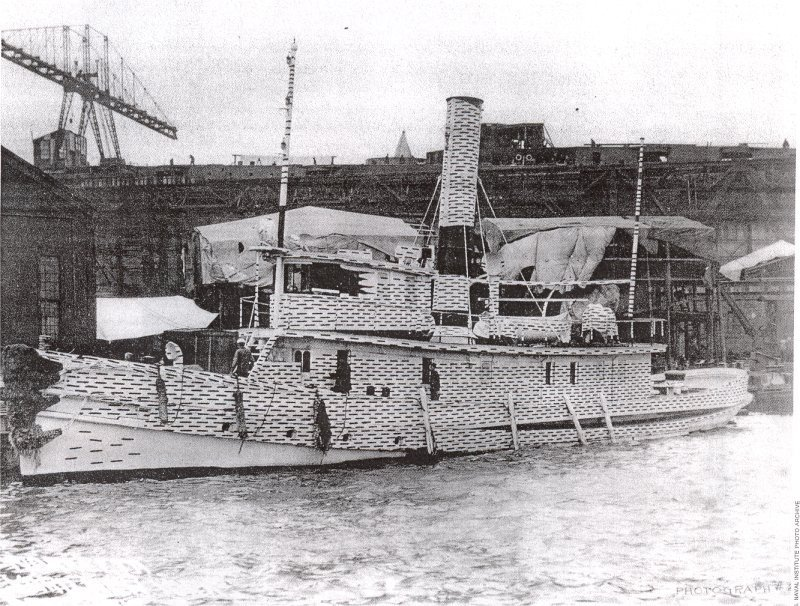

History

United States
- Name: USS Narkeeta
- Builder: City Point Iron Works, Boston, Massachusetts
- Laid down: April 1891
- Launched: 11 February 1892
- Acquired: 12 March 1892
- Commissioned: 14 April 1892
- Decommissioned: April 1923
- Reclassified: YT-3, 17 July 1920
- Fate: Sold, 28 October 1926

General characteristics
- Class & type: Wahneta-class tugboat
- Displacement: 192 long tons (195 t)
- Length: 92 ft 6 in (28.19 m)
- Beam: 21 ft (6.4 m)
- Draft: 8 ft (2.4 m)
- Speed: 11.5 knots (21.3 km/h; 13.2 mph)
- Complement: 9

The first USS Narkeeta (YT-3), was known as Steam Tug #3. She was laid down in April 1891 by the City Point Iron Works, Boston, Massachusetts; launched on 11 February 1892; accepted by the Navy at the Navy Yard, Boston, on 12 March 1892; and commissioned 14 April 1892.

Narkeeta, a two-masted steel tug, served the Navy, performing seemingly mundane, but all important, towing and tugging services, until 1923. Operating primarily in the New York area, she aided in the efficient movement of larger vessels in and out of that congested port during two wars, the Spanish–American War and World War I. Decommissioned in April 1923, she remained at New York until sold on 28 October 1926, to Joseph F. O'Boyle.
