= USS Ostrich (SP-1249) =

Patrol vessel of the United States Navy

History

United States
- Name: USS Ostrich
- Namesake: Previous name retained
- Builder: Electric Launch Company (ELCO), Bayonne, New Jersey
- Completed: 1909
- Acquired: 20 July 1917
- Commissioned: 25 October 1917
- Decommissioned: 23 December 1918
- Fate: Returned to owner 23 December 1918
- Notes: Operated as private motorboat Ostrich 1909–1917 and from 1918

General characteristics
- Type: Patrol vessel
- Tonnage: 38 Gross register tons
- Length: 35 ft (11 m)
- Beam: 5 ft 3 in (1.60 m)
- Draft: 2 ft 8 in (0.81 m)
- Complement: 2

The first USS Ostrich (SP-1249) was a United States Navy patrol vessel in commission from 1917 to 1919.

Ostrich was built as a private motorboat of the same name in 1909 in by the Electric Launch Company (ELCO) at Bayonne, New Jersey, for Nathan Strauss Jr. On 20 July 1917, the U.S. Navy acquired her on loan from her owner for use as a section patrol boat during World War I. She was commissioned on 25 October 1917 as USS Ostrich (SP-1249).

Assigned to the 3rd Naval District, Ostrich carried out patrol duties for the rest of World War I.

The Navy decommissioned Ostrich on 23 December 1918 and returned her to her owner the same day.
