= USS Ora =

History

United States
- Name: USS Ora
- Namesake: Previous name retained
- Builder: Samuel Gates, Key West, Florida
- Completed: 1914
- Acquired: 11 June 1917
- Commissioned: 13 July 1917
- Fate: Transferred to U.S. Department of Agriculture 6 December 1920
- Notes: In use as private motorboat Ora 1914-1917

General characteristics
- Type: Patrol vessel
- Tonnage: 33 tons
- Length: 55 ft (17 m)
- Beam: 15 ft 7 in (4.75 m)
- Draft: 3 ft 5 in (1.04 m)
- Speed: 10 knots
- Complement: 6
- Armament: 2 × 1-pounder guns

USS Ora (SP-75) was an armed motorboat that served in the United States Navy as a patrol vessel from 1917 to 1920.

Ora was built as a private motorboat of the same name in 1914 by Samuel Gates at Key West, Florida. The U.S. Navy acquired her for World War I service from her owners, I. W. Knight and W. R. Porter, on 11 June 1917 and commissioned her on 13 July 1917 as USS Ora (SP-75).

Operating in the 7th Naval District during World War I, Ora patrolled off Key West in 1918, guarding the port, towing barges in the area, and ferrying boarding officers to various ships to check their identification. Occasionally she sighted foreign ships such as the Peruvian Penaun and the Uruguayan gunboat Montevideo. In 1919 she operated off the Florida Keys, aiding in the location of several sunken barges, delivering messages to ships, and participating in drills and signal practice.

Ora was ordered sold on 30 July 1920, but was withdrawn from sale on 16 October 1920. Instead, she was transferred to the United States Department of Agriculture on 6 December 1920.
