= USS Ono (SP-128) =

Patrol vessel of the United States Navy

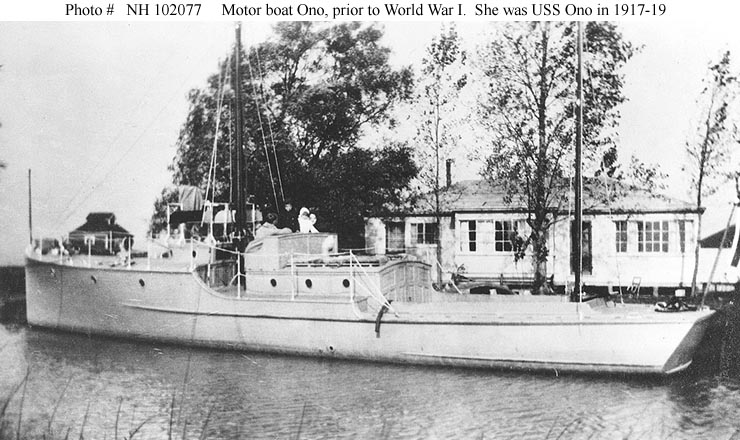
- Ono as a civilian motorboat prior to her U.S. Navy service.

History

United States
- Name: USS Ono
- Namesake: Previous name retained
- Builder: Seymour, Detroit, Michigan
- Completed: 1908
- Acquired: 16 June 1917 (formally purchased 2 July 1917)
- Commissioned: 16 June 1917
- Stricken: 12 August 1919
- Fate: Sold 20 November 1919
- Notes: Operated as private motorboat Ono 1908-1917

General characteristics
- Type: Patrol vessel
- Displacement: 6 tons
- Length: 46 ft 0 in (14.02 m)
- Beam: 10 ft (3.0 m)
- Draft: 2 ft 8 in (0.81 m)
- Speed: 15 miles per hour
- Complement: 5
- Armament: 1 × 1-pounder gun; 2 × machine guns

USS Ono (SP-128) was an armed motorboat that served in the United States Navy as a patrol vessel from 1917 to 1919.

Ono was built as a civilian motorboat in 1908 by Seymour at Detroit, Michigan. The U.S. Navy took control of Ono from her owner, William Reed-Hill of Detroit, on 16 June 1917 for use as a patrol boat during World War I. She was commissioned the same day as USS Ono (SP-128). The Navy formally purchased Ono from Reed-Hill on 2 July 1917.

Ono was assigned to the 10th Naval District, and patrolled the waters of the Great Lakes for the remainder of the war.

Ono was stricken from the Navy List on 12 August 1919 and sold to Harry M. Coomer on 20 November 1919.
