= USS Savannah (AS-8) =

Tender of the United States Navy

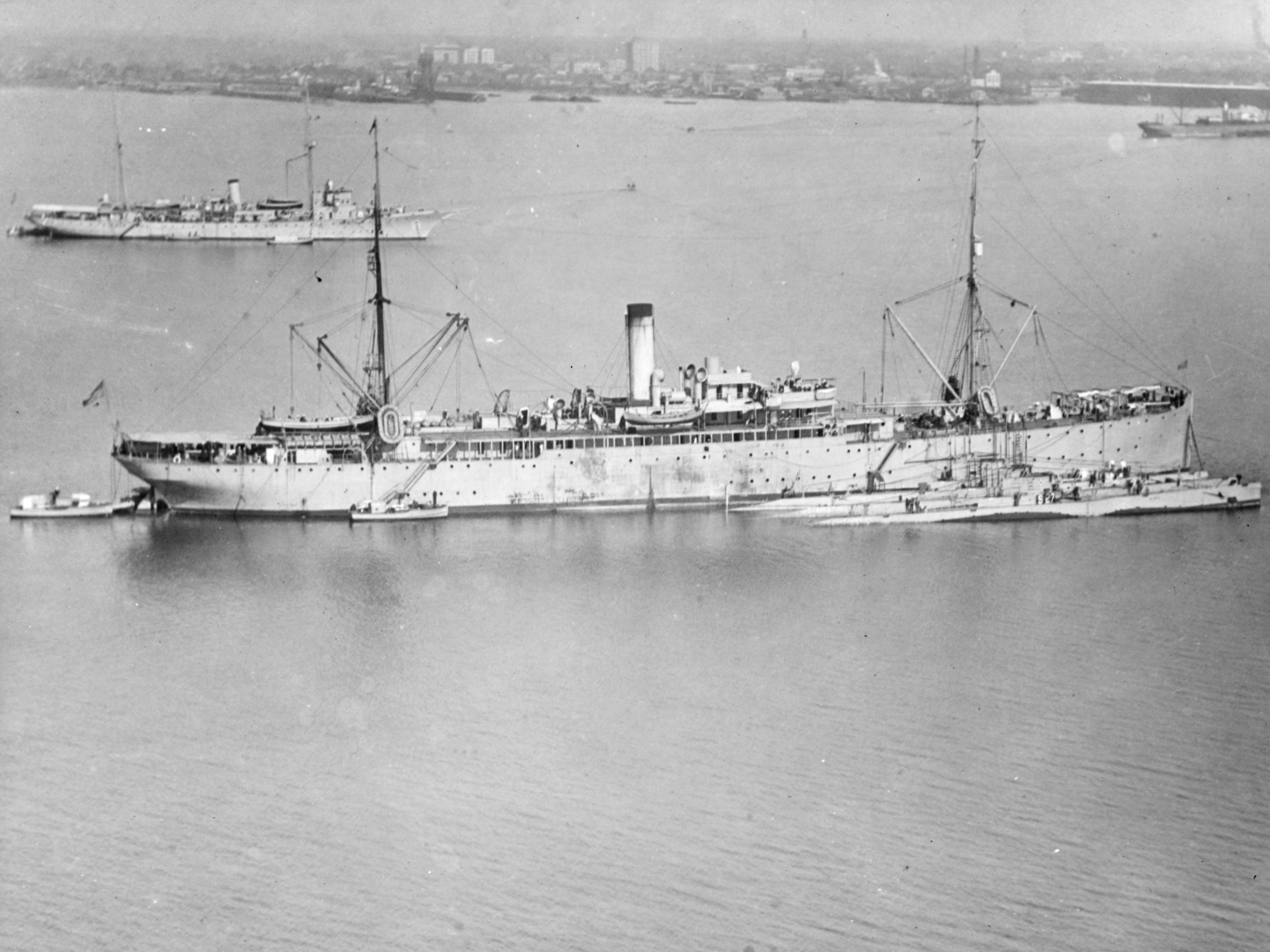
- Savannah with three S-class submarines alongside, in December 1924

History

United States
- Builder: Flensburger Schiffbau-Gesellschaft, Flensburg, Germany
- Launched: 18 April 1899
- Acquired: seized 1917
- Commissioned: 3 November 1917
- Decommissioned: 26 June 1934
- Renamed: AS-8 on 15 September 1933
- Stricken: 26 June 1934
- Fate: sold on 26 September 1934 to Mider & Marcus of Seattle, Washington, for mercantile service; Renamed Orbis in 1942; Scrapped in Japan, 1954

General characteristics
- Displacement: 10,800 tons
- Length: 414 ft 6 in (126.34 m)
- Beam: 46 ft 1 in (14.05 m)
- Draft: 26 ft 5 in (8.05 m)
- Complement: 275 officers and enlisted
- Armament: four 5-inch guns

USS Savannah (Id. No. 3015) (later designated AS-8) was a submarine tender in the United States Navy in World War I and the years after. She was launched 18 April 1899 as a German commercial freighter SS Saxonia, but was seized by the United States in 1917 and renamed Savannah. In 1933, the ship was renamed USS AS-8 to allow USS Savannah to have the Savannah name.

== Operational history ==
=== World War I ===
Saxonia was launched on 18 April 1899 for the Hamburg American Steamship Company, by the Flensburger Schiffbau-Gesellschaft, Flensburg, Germany. Seized, upon United States entry into World War I, at Seattle, Washington, where she had been interned since 1914, Saxonia was renamed Savannah on 9 June 1917; ordered converted to a submarine tender for the United States Navy on 20 October 1917; and commissioned on 3 November 1917 at the Puget Sound Navy Yard.

Completing temporary outfitting as a tender, Savannah was assigned to Submarine Division 8 which had been ordered to the east coast of the United States. Departing Puget Sound on 21 November, Savannah and submarines, N-1, N-2, and N-5 called at several ports including San Pedro, California; Magdalena Bay and Acapulco, Mexico; before arriving at Balboa, Canal Zone, on 31 December 1917. Transiting the Panama Canal, Savannah proceeded to Kingston, Jamaica; Key West, Florida; Norfolk, Virginia; and New London, Connecticut; eventually reaching the Boston Navy Yard for an extensive overhaul and conversion on 13 February 1918.

Standing out of Boston harbor on 1 August 1918, Savannah made for Newport, Rhode Island, to rejoin the 8th Division, Submarine Force, then consisting of O-3, O-4, O-5, O-6, O-7, O-8, O-9, and O-10. After cruising along the New York and New Jersey coasts, Savannah made a cruise to Ponta Delgada, Azores, in support of a submarine division bound for European waters. Arriving in the Azores on 16 November 1918, after the Armistice, Savannah was recalled. She returned to Charleston, South Carolina, on 13 December for repairs.

=== Post World War I years ===
Remaining with Submarine Division 8, Savannah operated along the east coast of the United States and in the Caribbean through July 1924. Her operations included support of frequent torpedo practice exercises, fleet maneuvers, and normal upkeep and maintenance of her flotilla. On 17 July 1920, Savannah was designated AS-8. In February 1923, she transited the Panama Canal during a fleet exercise, towing R-9, R-21, R-27, and S-20 at various times. Returning to the Caribbean, Savannah was employed in towing O-1 from Guantanamo Bay to the Norfolk Navy Yard, arriving on 21 April 1923. Other duties included assistance to S-23, stranded at the entrance to Chiriquí Lagoon, Panama, in April 1924.

Reassigned to Submarine Division 11 in July, Savannah continued to operate in the Atlantic and the Gulf of Mexico into 1925. Then ordered to the Pacific Fleet, Savannah departed the Canal Zone on 23 February 1925 for San Diego, arriving on 12 March. After two cruises to San Francisco, Savannah deployed to Kaunakakai, Molokai, Territory of Hawaii, for Fleet Problem III. Remaining in Hawaiian waters, she entered Pearl Harbor on 28 April for an abbreviated overhaul, after which she joined the Battle Force for exercises in Lahaina Roads.

Subsequently ordered to return to the west coast of the United States, Savannah arrived at Portland, Oregon, on 12 June 1925; and participated in the Rose Festival through 21 June. Overhaul at the Mare Island Navy Yard followed; and, in mid-September, Savannah took part in the California Diamond Jubilee celebrations at San Francisco. Assigned to duty as flagship, Commander, Submarine Divisions, Battle Force, Savannah operated along the Pacific coast from Washington to Panama into September 1926. Savannah's last duty was carrying passengers from San Pedro to Bremerton, where she arrived on 15 October. She was decommissioned on 16 December 1926 and was placed in reserve at the Puget Sound Navy Yard.

The large number of new vessels planned for the United States Fleet in the 1930s led to the selection of the name Savannah for a light cruiser, CL-42. Accordingly, Savannah (AS-8)'s name was dropped on 15 September 1933, the ship becoming just AS-8. Subsequently declared surplus to naval requirements, AS-8 was struck from the Naval Vessel Register on 26 June 1934 and sold on 26 September 1934 to Mider & Marcus of Seattle, for mercantile service.

=== World War II and beyond ===
In 1942, the ship was renamed Orbis and sailed as a merchant vessel in Atlantic convoys.

On 24 October 1942, Orbis was traveling with the Iceland-bound portion of Convoy SC 105, when her steering gear broke. While she underwent repairs, U.S. Coast Guard cutter Duane stood by until she got underway four hours later.

On 28 November 1942, Orbis joined Convoy ON 148 in Iceland to journey to Halifax.

The ship was broken up for scrap in Japan during 1954.
