= USS O-9 =

O-class submarine of the United States

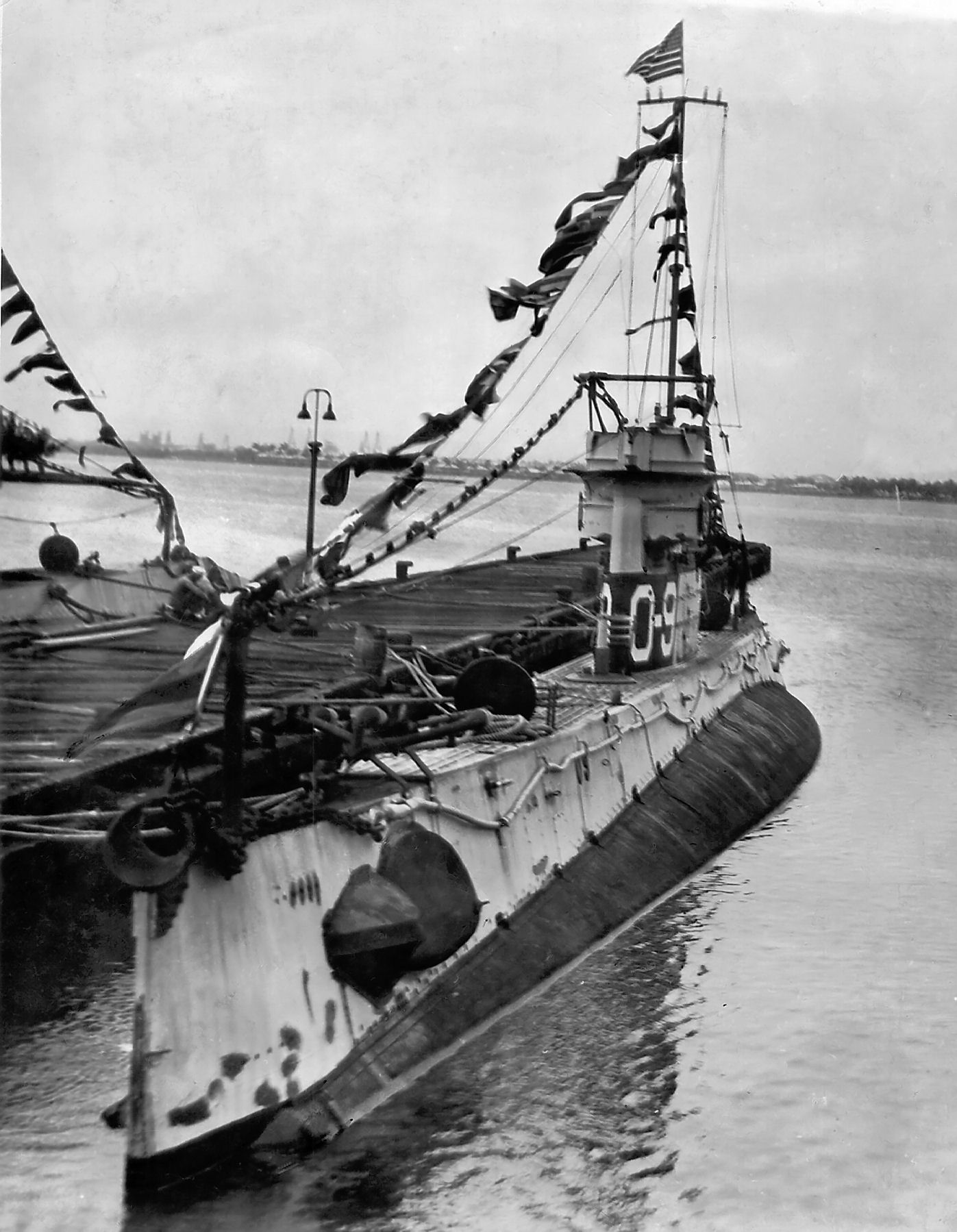
- O-9 dressed overall on Washington's Birthday, 1928, in Coco Solo, Panama Canal Zone

History

United States
- Name: O-9
- Ordered: 3 March 1916
- Builder: Fore River Shipbuilding Company, Quincy, Massachusetts
- Cost: $522,187.97 (hull and machinery)
- Laid down: 15 February 1917
- Launched: 27 January 1918
- Sponsored by: Mrs. Fanny Sherman
- Commissioned: 27 July 1918
- Decommissioned: 25 June 1931
- Recommissioned: 14 April 1941
- Stricken: 23 October 1941
- Identification: Hull symbol: SS-70 (17 July 1920); Call sign: NAGB
- Fate: Foundered, 20 June 1941

General characteristics
- Class & type: O-1-class submarine
- Displacement: 520 long tons (528 t) surfaced; 629 long tons (639 t) submerged
- Length: 172 ft 4 in (52.53 m)
- Beam: 18 ft (5.5 m)
- Draft: 14 ft 5 in (4.39 m)
- Installed power: 880 bhp (656 kW) diesel; 740 hp (552 kW) electric
- Propulsion: 2 × NELSECO 6-EB-14 diesel engines; 2 × Electro-Dynamic Company electric motors; 2 × 60-cell batteries; 2 × Propellers
- Speed: 14 knots (26 km/h; 16 mph) surfaced; 10.5 knots (19.4 km/h; 12.1 mph) submerged
- Range: 5,500 nmi (10,200 km) at 11.5 kn (21.3 km/h; 13.2 mph) surfaced; 250 nmi (460 km) at 5 kn (9.3 km/h; 5.8 mph) submerged
- Test depth: 200 ft (61 m)
- Capacity: 21,897 US gal (82,890 L; 18,233 imp gal) fuel
- Complement: 2 officers; 27 enlisted
- Armament: 4 × 18 inch (450 mm) bow torpedo tubes (8 torpedoes); 1 × 3 in (76 mm)/23 caliber retractable deck gun

USS O-9 (SS-70), also known as "Submarine No. 70", was one of 16 O-class submarines of the United States Navy commissioned during World War I. She was recommissioned on 14 April 1941, prior to the United States entry into WWII, for use as a trainer. On 20 June 1941, she sank approximately 15 mi (24 km) off Portsmouth, New Hampshire, with the loss of 33 lives. The wreck was located in 1997.

== Design ==
The O-1-class submarines were designed to meet a Navy requirement for coastal defense boats. The submarines had a length of 172 ft 4 in (52.5 m) overall, a beam of 18 ft 1 in (5.5 m), and a mean draft of 14 ft 5 in (4.4 m). They displaced 520 long tons (530 t) on the surface and 629 long tons (639 t) submerged. The O-class submarines had a crew of 2 officers and 27 enlisted men. They had a diving depth of 200 ft (61.0 m).

For surface running, the boats were powered by two 440-brake-horsepower (328 kW) NELSECO 6-EB-14 diesel engines, each driving one propeller shaft. When submerged each propeller was driven by a 370-horsepower (276 kW) Electro-Dynamic Company electric motor. They could reach 14 knots (26 km/h; 16 mph) on the surface and 10.5 kn (19.4 km/h; 12.1 mph) underwater. On the surface, the O-class had a range of 5,500 nautical miles (10,200 km; 6,300 mi) at 11.5 kn (21.3 km/h; 13.2 mph).

The boats were armed with four 18-inch (450 mm) torpedo tubes in the bow. They carried four reloads, for a total of eight torpedoes. The O-class submarines were also armed with a single 3 in (76 mm)/23 caliber retractable deck gun.

== Construction ==
O-9's keel was laid down on 15 February 1917, at Fore River Shipbuilding Company, of Quincy, Massachusetts. She was launched on 27 January 1918, sponsored by Mrs. Fanny Sherman, the wife of Lieutenant Commander Frederick C. Sherman, the ships commanding officer while under construction, and commissioned on 27 July 1918.

== Service history ==
During the final months of World War I, O-9 operated on coastal patrol and protected the Atlantic coast from German U-boats. She departed Newport, Rhode Island, on 2 November 1918, with a 20-sub contingent for Britain, in order to conduct her first war patrol. However, the end of the war came before O-9 reached Europe.

After the war, O-9 continued in Naval service and trained submarine crews at the Submarine School at New London, Connecticut.

When the US Navy adopted its hull classification system on 17 July 1920, she received the hull number SS-70.

Proceeding to Coco Solo, Panama Canal Zone, in 1924, the boat was reclassified to a second-line submarine during her year there. Returning to operate at New London, O-9 reverted to a first-line submarine on 6 June 1928. Sailing up to Portsmouth, New Hampshire, in January 1930, the submarine returned to New London, in March; the following February, she sailed to Philadelphia Navy Yard, to decommission there on 25 June 1931.

Remaining on the Naval Vessel Register, O-9 was recalled to training service as the US involvement in World War II became more inevitable. The 12 Tambor-class submarines were already nearing completion and 73 Gato class boats had already been ordered when O-9 was recommissioned at Philadelphia, on 14 April 1941, and went to New London on 31 May.

In all, eight of the original ten O-boats were recommissioned to serve as training submarines in the Second World War. O-5 had been sunk after a collision, in 1923, and O-1 had been scrapped in 1938. O-9, in particular, required extensive work, and still suffered mechanical problems even after being returned to service.

=== Operational loss ===
On the morning of 19 June 1941, O-9 and two of her sisters, O-6 and O-10, left as a group from the submarine base in New London, for the submarine test depth diving area east of the Isles of Shoals. Upon reaching their designated training area the following day, some 15 mi (24 km) off Portsmouth, New Hampshire, O-6 made the first dive, followed by O-10. Finally, at 07:38, O-9 began her dive; the sub did not surface thereafter but was crushed by the pressure of the water over 400 ft (120 m) below. The sub went down in the area where Squalus had been lost.

Rescue ships swung into action immediately. O-6 and O-10, submarine Triton, submarine rescue ship Falcon, and other ships, searched for O-9, and divers went down from 13:00, 21 June, until 11:43, 22 June. Divers went to record depths for salvage operations but could stay but a brief time at the 440-foot (130 m) depth; but nonetheless set endurance and depth records for salvage operations until those operations were cancelled, as they were considered too risky. The boat and her 33 officers and men were declared lost as of 20 June.

On 22 June, Secretary of the Navy Frank Knox conducted memorial services for the 33 officers and men lost on the boat. O-9 was struck from the Naval Vessel Register on 23 October 1941.

== Memorial ==
A commemorative plaque, listing the officers and men of O-9, is located at Albacore Park in Portsmouth, New Hampshire.

== Wreck discovery ==
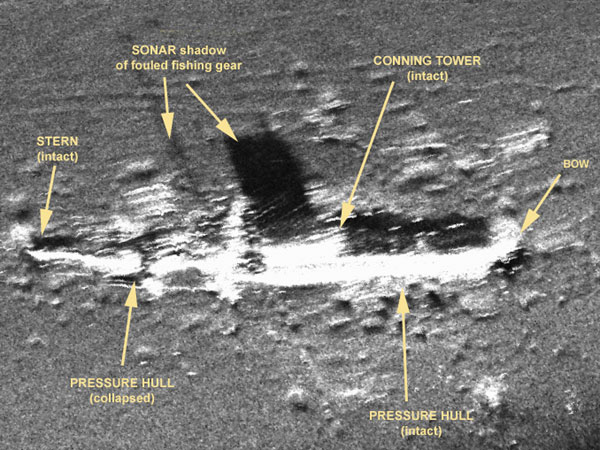
Sonar image of USS O-9 by NOAA Office of Ocean Exploration and Research

A three-day pass from USS O-9 dated 26 May 1930

In September 1997, the wreckage of O-9 was located, approximately 17 nmi (31 km; 20 mi) off of Portsmouth, at a depth of approximately 430 ft (130 m). Sonar equipment from Klein Associates of Salem, New Hampshire, was used to find the submarine. Her hull was seen to be crushed from just abaft the conning tower all the way to the stern, though the forward hull appeared intact. There are no plans to salvage O-9. Her exact location was disclosed only to the Naval Historical Center.

Wreck location: 43°00′18″N 70°20′36″W

== In popular culture ==
In H. P. Lovecraft's short story The Shadow over Innsmouth, written in 1931, a US Navy submarine is described as firing torpedoes into the undersea habitation of Deep Ones, off the fictional Innsmouth, Massachusetts.

More recently, and following Lovecraft's own pretense of presenting a pseudo-historical tale, Kenneth Hite and Kennon Bauman, have depicted the submarine as being O-9 in their book The Cthulhu Wars. In doing so, they presented the vessel's loss in 1941, as having been related to the fictional torpedo attack on the Deep Ones. They even mentioned the actual commander of O-9 in 1927–1928, Lieutenant J. T. Acree.

== See also ==
- List of disasters in New Hampshire by death toll

== Bibliography ==
- "Table 21 - Ships on Navy List June 30, 1919". Congressional Serial Set. U.S. Government Printing Office: 768. 1921.
- Priolo, Gary. "O-9 (SS-70)". Navsource.net.
- Friedman, Norman (1995). U.S. Submarines Through 1945: An Illustrated Design History. Annapolis, Maryland: Naval Institute Press. ISBN 1-55750-263-3.
- Gardiner, Robert & Gray, Randal (1985). Conway's All the World's Fighting Ships 1906–1921. Annapolis, Maryland: Naval Institute Press. ISBN 0-85177-245-5.
- "O-9". Dictionary of American Naval Fighting Ships. Navy Department, Naval History and Heritage Command. 17 August 2015. This article incorporates text from this source, which is in the public domain.
- Hall, Anne Martin (1925). Ships of the United States navy and their sponsors, 1913-1923.
- McCool, Joseph Daniel (23 September 1997). "Commemorative plaque". The Day. New London, Connecticut – via newspapers.com.
- Hamilton, Robert A. (23 September 1997). "Sonar discovers U.S. sub lost 56 years ago". The Day. New London, Connecticut – via newspapers.com.
- Hite, Kenneth; Bauman, Kennon (2016). The Cthulhu Wars: The United States' Battles Against the Mythos. Oxford, UK: Osprey Publishing. ISBN 978-1-4728-0787-8.
- Navy Directory: Officers of the United States Navy and Marine Corps. Washington, DC: Government Printing Office. 1927.
- "Special sonar locates missing sub". Sun Journal. Lewiston, Maine. AP. 17 September 1997 – via newspapers.com.
- Lovecraft, Howard Phillips (2014). Klinger, Leslie S. (ed.). The New Annotated H.P. Lovecraft. New York: Liveright Publishing Corporation. ISBN 978-0-87140-453-4.
