= USS O-11 =

O-class submarine of the United States

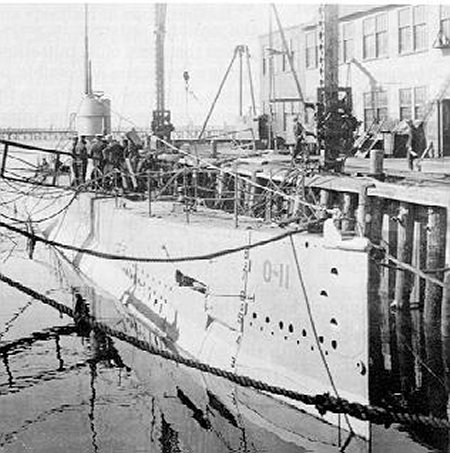
- USS O-11 fitting out at the Lake Torpedo Boat Company, Bridgeport, Connecticut, July 1918

History

United States
- Name: O-11
- Ordered: 3 March 1916
- Builder: Lake Torpedo Boat Company, Bridgeport, Connecticut
- Cost: $46,932.10 (hull and machinery)
- Laid down: 6 March 1916
- Launched: 29 October 1917
- Sponsored by: Mrs. Anne Baruch
- Commissioned: 19 October 1918
- Decommissioned: 21 June 1924
- Stricken: 9 May 1930
- Identification: Hull symbol: SS-72 (17 July 1920); Call sign: NETK
- Fate: Sold for scrap, 30 July 1930

General characteristics
- Class & type: O-11-class submarine
- Displacement: 485 long tons (493 t) surfaced; 566 long tons (575 t) submerged
- Length: 175 ft (53 m)
- Beam: 16 ft 7 in (5.05 m)
- Draft: 13 ft 11 in (4.24 m)
- Installed power: 1,000 bhp (746 kW); 800 hp (597 kW)
- Propulsion: 2 × Busch-Sulzer diesel engines; 2 × Diehl Manufacture Company electric motors; 1 × 120-cell battery; 2 × shafts
- Speed: 14 kn surfaced; 11 kn (20 km/h; 13 mph) submerged
- Range: 5500 nmi at 11.5 kn surfaced; 250 nmi at 5 kn submerged
- Test depth: 200 ft
- Capacity: 18,588 US gal (70,360 L; 15,478 imp gal) fuel
- Complement: 2 officers; 27 enlisted
- Armament: 4 × 18 inch bow torpedo tubes (8 torpedoes); 1 × 3 in/23 caliber retractable deck gun

USS O-11 (SS-72), also known as "Submarine No. 72", was one of 16 O-class submarines of the United States Navy commissioned during World War I.

== Design ==
The later O-boats, O-11 through O-16, were designed by the Lake Torpedo Boat Company, to different specifications from the earlier boats designed by Electric Boat. They did not perform as well, and are sometimes considered a separate class. The submarines had a length of 175 ft (53.3 m) overall, a beam of 16 ft 7 in (5.1 m), and a mean draft of 13 ft 11 in (4.2 m). They displaced 485 long tons (493 t) on the surface and 566 long tons (575 t) submerged. The O-class submarines had a crew of 2 officers and 27 enlisted men. They had a diving depth of 200 ft (61.0 m).

For surface running, the boats were powered by two 500-brake-horsepower (373 kW) Busch-Sulzer diesel engines, each driving one propeller shaft. When submerged each propeller was driven by a 370-horsepower (276 kW) Diehl Manufacture Company electric motor. They could reach 14 knots (26 km/h; 16 mph) on the surface and 11 kn (20 km/h; 13 mph) underwater. On the surface, the O class had a range of 5,500 nautical miles (10,200 km; 6,300 mi) at 11.5 kn (21.3 km/h; 13.2 mph).

The boats were armed with four 18-inch (450 mm) torpedo tubes in the bow. They carried four reloads, for a total of eight torpedoes. The O-class submarines were also armed with a single 3 in (76 mm)/23 caliber retractable deck gun.

== Construction ==
O-11's keel was laid down on 6 March 1916, by the Lake Torpedo Boat Company, in Bridgeport, Connecticut. She was launched on 29 October 1917, sponsored by Mrs. Anne Baruch, and commissioned at the New York Navy Yard, on 19 October 1918.

== Service history ==
Commissioned too late for World War I combat service, O-11 joined other boats of her class at Cape May, New Jersey, in 1919. On 20 September 1919, she was placed in commission, in reserve, at Cape May, and steamed to the Philadelphia Navy Yard, in October; workmen at Philadelphia, spent months working on the boat before she departed for Coco Solo, in the Panama Canal Zone.

The arrival of a submarine squadron at Coco Solo, in 1913, had demonstrated the usefulness of the boats, the base continued as a distant submarine overhaul and testing area, into the 1920s.

When the US Navy adopted its hull classification system on 17 July 1920, she received the hull number SS-72.

O-11 reported there in 1922; after deck crews had brought her up to prime efficiency, she took several test dives off Panama, in spring 1923. In October, she sailed to Philadelphia.

== Fate ==
O-11 decommissioned at Philadelphia, 21 June 1924, after just five and a half years of service, and was turned over to the Commandant, Navy Yard, Philadelphia. Struck from the Naval Vessel Register on 9 May 1930, the boat was sold in July 1930.

== Bibliography ==
- "Table 21 - Ships on Navy List June 30, 1919". Congressional Serial Set. U.S. Government Printing Office: 769. 1921.
- Gary, Priolo. "O-11 (SS-72)". Navsource.net.
- Friedman, Norman (1995). U.S. Submarines Through 1945: An Illustrated Design History. Annapolis, Maryland: Naval Institute Press. ISBN 1-55750-263-3.
- Gardiner, Robert & Gray, Randal (1985). Conway's All the World's Fighting Ships 1906–1921. Annapolis, Maryland: Naval Institute Press. ISBN 0-85177-245-5.
- "O-11". Dictionary of American Naval Fighting Ships. Navy Department, Naval History and Heritage Command. 17 August 2015. This article incorporates text from this source, which is in the public domain.
- Hall, Anne Martin (1925). Ships of the United States navy and their sponsors, 1913-1923.
