= USS O-2 =

O-class submarine of the United States

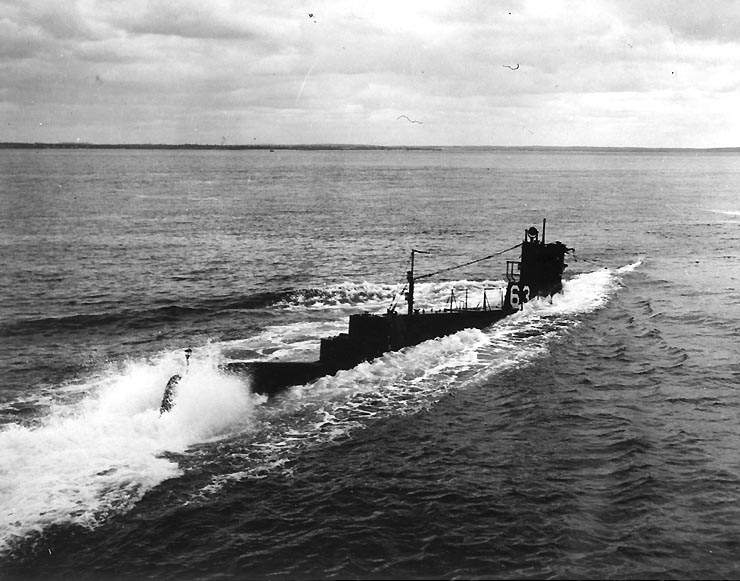
- USS O-2 (SS-63) diving, during training operations out of New London, Connecticut, 26 November 1943

History

United States
- Name: O-2
- Ordered: 3 March 1916
- Builder: Puget Sound Navy Yard, Bremerton, Washington
- Cost: $698,412.51 (hull and machinery)
- Laid down: 7 July 1917
- Launched: 24 May 1918
- Sponsored by: Mrs. Mary Chew
- Commissioned: 19 October 1918
- Decommissioned: 25 June 1931
- Recommissioned: 3 February 1941
- Decommissioned: 26 July 1945
- Stricken: 11 August 1945
- Identification: Hull symbol: SS-63 (17 July 1920); Call sign: NETJ
- Fate: Sold for scrap, 16 November 1945

General characteristics
- Class & type: O-1-class submarine
- Displacement: 520 long tons (528 t) surfaced; 629 long tons (639 t) submerged
- Length: 172 ft 4 in (52.53 m)
- Beam: 18 ft (5.5 m)
- Draft: 14 ft 5 in (4.39 m)
- Installed power: 880 bhp (656 kW) diesel; 740 hp (552 kW) electric
- Propulsion: 2 × NELSECO 6-EB-14 diesel engines; 2 × New York Navy Yard electric motors; 2 × 60-cell batteries; 2 × Propellers
- Speed: 14 knots (26 km/h; 16 mph) surfaced; 10.5 knots (19.4 km/h; 12.1 mph) submerged
- Range: 5,500 nmi (10,200 km) at 11.5 kn (21.3 km/h; 13.2 mph) surfaced; 250 nmi (460 km) at 5 kn (9.3 km/h; 5.8 mph) submerged
- Test depth: 200 ft (61 m)
- Capacity: 21,897 US gal (82,890 L; 18,233 imp gal) fuel
- Complement: 2 officers; 27 enlisted
- Armament: 4 × 18 inch (450 mm) bow torpedo tubes (8 torpedoes); 1 × 3 in (76 mm)/23 caliber retractable deck gun

USS O-2 (SS-63), also known as "Submarine No. 63", was one of 16 O-class submarines of the United States Navy commissioned during World War I. She was recommissioned prior to the United States entry into WWII, for use as a trainer.

== Design ==
The O-1-class submarines were designed to meet a Navy requirement for coastal defense boats. The submarines had a length of 172 ft 4 in (52.5 m) overall, a beam of 18 ft 1 in (5.5 m), and a mean draft of 14 ft 5 in (4.4 m). They displaced 520 long tons (530 t) on the surface and 629 long tons (639 t) submerged. The O-class submarines had a crew of 2 officers and 27 enlisted men. They had a diving depth of 200 ft (61.0 m).

For surface running, the boats were powered by two 440-brake-horsepower (328 kW) NELSECO 6-EB-14 diesel engines, each driving one propeller shaft. When submerged each propeller was driven by a 370-horsepower (276 kW) New York Navy Yard electric motor. They could reach 14 knots (26 km/h; 16 mph) on the surface and 10.5 kn (19.4 km/h; 12.1 mph) underwater. On the surface, the O-class had a range of 5,500 nautical miles (10,200 km; 6,300 mi) at 11.5 kn (21.3 km/h; 13.2 mph).

The boats were armed with four 18-inch (450 mm) torpedo tubes in the bow. They carried four reloads, for a total of eight torpedoes. The O-class submarines were also armed with a single 3 in (76 mm)/23 caliber retractable deck gun.

== Construction ==
O-2's keel was laid down on 27 July 1917, by the Puget Sound Navy Yard, in Bremerton, Washington. She was launched on 24 May 1918, sponsored by Mrs. Mary Chew, and commissioned at Puget Sound, on 19 October 1918.

== Service history ==
During World War I, O-2 patrolled off the New England coast until war's end.

When the US Navy adopted its hull classification system on 17 July 1920, she received the hull number SS-63.

Reclassified as a second-line submarine on 25 July 1924, and reverting to a first-liner on 6 June 1928, she served at the submarine base, New London, Connecticut, in training officers and men until 1931, except for a brief tour at Coco Solo, Panama Canal Zone, in 1924. In 1931, she transferred to the Philadelphia Navy Yard, where she decommissioned on 25 June 1931.

With increasing possibility of US involvement in World War II, O-2 recommissioned at Philadelphia, on 3 February 1941. Steaming to New London, in June, she trained submarine crews there until after Germany collapsed.

== Fate ==
She decommissioned on 26 July 1945, was struck on 11 August 1945, and was sold on 16 November 1945.

== Awards ==
- World War I Victory Medal
- American Defense Service Medal
- American Campaign Medal
- World War II Victory Medal

== Bibliography ==
- "Table 21 - Ships on Navy List June 30, 1919". Congressional Serial Set. U.S. Government Printing Office: 768. 1921.
- Gary, Priolo. "O-2 (SS-63)". Navsource.net.
- Friedman, Norman (1995). U.S. Submarines Through 1945: An Illustrated Design History. Annapolis, Maryland: Naval Institute Press. ISBN 1-55750-263-3.
- Gardiner, Robert & Gray, Randal (1985). Conway's All the World's Fighting Ships 1906–1921. Annapolis, Maryland: Naval Institute Press. ISBN 0-85177-245-5.
- "O-2". Dictionary of American Naval Fighting Ships. Navy Department, Naval History and Heritage Command. This article incorporates text from this source, which is in the public domain.
- Hall, Anne Martin (1925). Ships of the United States navy and their sponsors, 1913-1923.
