= O13 =

O13 or O-13 may refer to:

- Curtiss O-13 Falcon, an observation aircraft of the United States Army Air Corps
- HNLMS O 13, a submarine of the Royal Netherlands Navy
- Oxygen-13, an isotope of oxygen
- Pyramid O-13, the hypothesized mortuary temple of Itzam Kʼan Ahk II
- USS O-13 (SS-74), a submarine of the United States Navy

== See also ==
- 013, a music venue in Tilburg, the Netherlands
