= USS O-7 =

O-class submarine of the United States

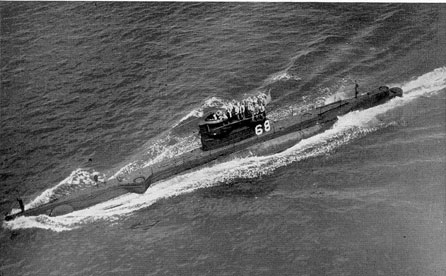
- USS O-7 (SS-68) possibly in October 1944, in the Atlantic, south of Fishers Island

History

United States
- Name: O-7
- Ordered: 3 March 1916
- Builder: Fore River Shipbuilding Company, Quincy, Massachusetts
- Cost: $521,016.74 (hull and machinery)
- Laid down: 14 February 1917
- Launched: 16 December 1917
- Sponsored by: Miss Constance Sears
- Commissioned: 4 July 1918
- Decommissioned: 1 July 1931
- Recommissioned: 12 February 1941
- Decommissioned: 2 July 1945
- Stricken: 11 July 1945
- Identification: Hull symbol: SS-68 (17 July 1920); Call sign: NAMC
- Fate: Sold for scrap, 22 January 1946

General characteristics
- Class & type: O-1-class submarine
- Displacement: 520 long tons (528 t) surfaced; 629 long tons (639 t) submerged
- Length: 172 ft 4 in (52.53 m)
- Beam: 18 ft (5.5 m)
- Draft: 14 ft 5 in (4.39 m)
- Installed power: 880 bhp (656 kW) diesel; 740 hp (552 kW) electric
- Propulsion: 2 × NELSECO 6-EB-14 diesel engines; 2 × Electro-Dynamic Company electric motors; 2 × 60-cell batteries; 2 × Propellers
- Speed: 14 knots (26 km/h; 16 mph) surfaced; 10.5 knots (19.4 km/h; 12.1 mph) submerged
- Range: 5,500 nmi (10,200 km) at 11.5 kn (21.3 km/h; 13.2 mph) surfaced; 250 nmi (460 km) at 5 kn (9.3 km/h; 5.8 mph) submerged
- Test depth: 200 ft (61 m)
- Capacity: 21,897 US gal (82,890 L; 18,233 imp gal) fuel
- Complement: 2 officers; 27 enlisted
- Armament: 4 × 18 inch (450 mm) bow torpedo tubes (8 torpedoes); 1 × 3 in (76 mm)/23 caliber retractable deck gun

USS O-7 (SS-68), also known as "Submarine No. 68", was one of 16 O-class submarines of the United States Navy commissioned during World War I. She was recommissioned prior to the United States entry into WWII, for use as a trainer.

== Design ==
The O-1-class submarines were designed to meet a Navy requirement for coastal defense boats. The submarines had a length of 172 ft 4 in (52.5 m) overall, a beam of 18 ft 1 in (5.5 m), and a mean draft of 14 ft 5 in (4.4 m). They displaced 520 long tons (530 t) on the surface and 629 long tons (639 t) submerged. The O-class submarines had a crew of 2 officers and 27 enlisted men. They had a diving depth of 200 ft (61.0 m).

For surface running, the boats were powered by two 440-brake-horsepower (328 kW) NELSECO 6-EB-14 diesel engines, each driving one propeller shaft. When submerged each propeller was driven by a 370-horsepower (276 kW) Electro-Dynamic Company electric motor. They could reach 14 knots (26 km/h; 16 mph) on the surface and 10.5 kn (19.4 km/h; 12.1 mph) underwater. On the surface, the O-class had a range of 5,500 nautical miles (10,200 km; 6,300 mi) at 11.5 kn (21.3 km/h; 13.2 mph).

The boats were armed with four 18-inch (450 mm) torpedo tubes in the bow. They carried four reloads, for a total of eight torpedoes. The O-class submarines were also armed with a single 3 in (76 mm)/23 caliber retractable deck gun.

== Construction ==
O-7' keel was laid down on 14 February 1917, by the Fore River Shipbuilding Company, in Quincy, Massachusetts. She was launched on 16 December 1917, sponsored by Miss Constance Sears, and commissioned on 4 July 1918 with Lieutenant Commander Frederick C. Sherman, in command.

== Service history ==
During the final stages of World War I, O-7 operated out of the Philadelphia Navy Yard, on coastal patrol from Cape Cod, in Massachusetts, to Key West, in Florida. On 2 November 1918, she departed Newport, Rhode Island, with a 20-sub contingent bound for European waters, however, the Armistice with Germany was signed before the ships reached the Azores, and they returned to the United States.

In 1919, O-7 reported to the newly established Submarine School, at New London, Connecticut, to train there for the next decade.

When the US Navy adopted its hull classification system on 17 July 1920, she received the hull number SS-68.

In 1924, she went to Coco Solo, in the Panama Canal Zone, for maneuvers and was reclassified a second-line submarine on 25 July 1924. Returning to New London, she reverted to first-line on 6 June 1928. In January 1930, she joined her sister boats in a run to Portsmouth, New Hampshire, thence back to New London, in February. After returning from Washington, DC, in July, she continued operations at New London. She sailed to Philadelphia, Pennsylvania, on 23 February 1931, and decommissioned there on 1 July 1931.

After a decade in mothballs, O-7 was recalled to active duty and recommissioned at Philadelphia, 12 February 1941. She reported to New London, in May, and trained sub crews there until the end of World War II.

== Fate ==
O-7 was decommissioned on 2 July 1945; was struck from the Naval Vessel Register on 11 July 1945; and sold to North American Smelting Company, of Philadelphia, on 22 January 1946.

== Bibliography ==
- "Table 21 - Ships on Navy List June 30, 1919". Congressional Serial Set. U.S. Government Printing Office: 768. 1921.
- Mohl, Michael. "O-7 (SS-68)". Navsource.net.
- Friedman, Norman (1995). U.S. Submarines Through 1945: An Illustrated Design History. Annapolis, Maryland: Naval Institute Press. ISBN 1-55750-263-3.
- Gardiner, Robert & Gray, Randal (1985). Conway's All the World's Fighting Ships 1906–1921. Annapolis, Maryland: Naval Institute Press. ISBN 0-85177-245-5.
- "O-7". Dictionary of American Naval Fighting Ships. Navy Department, Naval History and Heritage Command. This article incorporates text from this source, which is in the public domain.
- Hall, Anne Martin (1925). Ships of the United States navy and their sponsors, 1913-1923.
