= USS O-3 =

O-class submarine of the United States

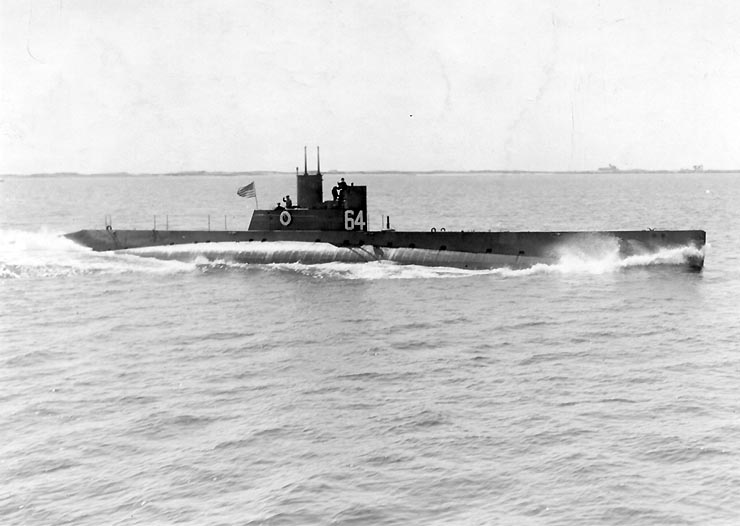
- USS O-3 underway, c. 1918, in much of her original form with a 3in/23 gun in a disappearing mount forward of her bridge fairwater and her two periscopes in faired shears

History

United States
- Name: O-3
- Ordered: 3 March 1916
- Builder: Fore River Shipbuilding Company, Quincy, Massachusetts
- Cost: $573,619.36 (hull and machinery)
- Laid down: 2 December 1916
- Launched: 27 September 1917
- Sponsored by: Mrs. Alma Dickson
- Commissioned: 13 June 1918
- Decommissioned: 6 June 1931
- Recommissioned: 3 February 1941
- Decommissioned: 11 September 1945
- Stricken: 11 October 1945
- Identification: Hull symbol: SS-64 (17 July 1920); Call sign: NAMR
- Fate: Sold for scrap, 4 September 1946

General characteristics
- Class & type: O-1-class submarine
- Displacement: 520 long tons (528 t) surfaced; 629 long tons (639 t) submerged
- Length: 172 ft 4 in (52.53 m)
- Beam: 18 ft (5.5 m)
- Draft: 14 ft 5 in (4.39 m)
- Installed power: 880 bhp (656 kW) diesel; 740 hp (552 kW) electric
- Propulsion: 2 × NELSECO 6-EB-14 diesel engines; 2 × New York Navy Yard electric motors; 2 × 60-cell batteries; 2 × Propellers
- Speed: 14 knots (26 km/h; 16 mph) surfaced; 10.5 knots (19.4 km/h; 12.1 mph) submerged
- Range: 5,500 nmi (10,200 km) at 11.5 kn (21.3 km/h; 13.2 mph) surfaced; 250 nmi (460 km) at 5 kn (9.3 km/h; 5.8 mph) submerged
- Test depth: 200 ft (61 m)
- Capacity: 21,897 US gal (82,890 L; 18,233 imp gal) fuel
- Complement: 2 officers; 27 enlisted
- Armament: 4 × 18 inch (450 mm) bow torpedo tubes (8 torpedoes); 1 × 3 in (76 mm)/23 caliber retractable deck gun

USS O-3 (SS-64), also known as "Submarine No. 64", was one of 16 O-class submarines of the United States Navy commissioned during World War I. She was recommissioned prior to the United States entry into WWII, for use as a trainer.

== Design ==
The O-1-class submarines were designed to meet a Navy requirement for coastal defense boats. The submarines had a length of 172 ft 4 in (52.5 m) overall, a beam of 18 ft 1 in (5.5 m), and a mean draft of 14 ft 5 in (4.4 m). They displaced 520 long tons (530 t) on the surface and 629 long tons (639 t) submerged. The O-class submarines had a crew of 2 officers and 27 enlisted men. They had a diving depth of 200 ft (61.0 m).

For surface running, the boats were powered by two 440-brake-horsepower (328 kW) NELSECO 6-EB-14 diesel engines, each driving one propeller shaft. When submerged each propeller was driven by a 370-horsepower (276 kW) New York Navy Yard electric motor. They could reach 14 knots (26 km/h; 16 mph) on the surface and 10.5 kn (19.4 km/h; 12.1 mph) underwater. On the surface, the O-class had a range of 5,500 nautical miles (10,200 km; 6,300 mi) at 11.5 kn (21.3 km/h; 13.2 mph).

The boats were armed with four 18-inch (450 mm) torpedo tubes in the bow. They carried four reloads, for a total of eight torpedoes. The O-class submarines were also armed with a single 3 in (76 mm)/23 caliber retractable deck gun.

== Construction ==
O-3's keel was laid down on 2 December 1916, by the Fore River Shipbuilding Company, in Quincy, Massachusetts. She was launched on 27 September 1917, sponsored by Mrs. Alma Dickson, and commissioned on 13 June.

== Service history ==
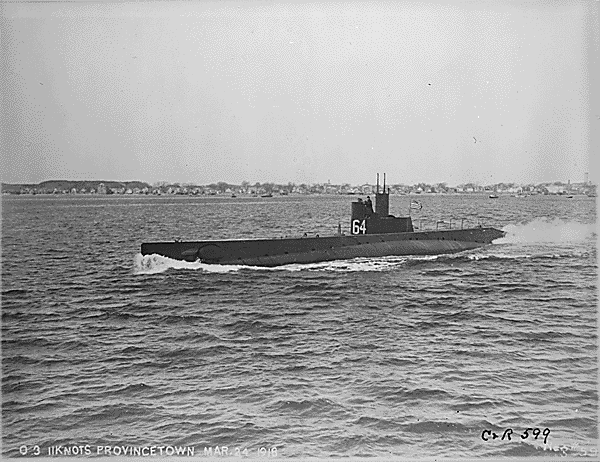
USS O-3 pictured here during her shakedown trials on 24 March 1918

The new submarine joined the Atlantic coastal patrol and kept watch for U-boats from Cape Cod, in Massachusetts, to Key West, in Florida. In November, she joined a 20-submarine contingent that departed Newport, Rhode Island, on 3 November for service in European waters. Before the ships had reached the Azores, the Armistice with Germany ended World War I.

After the war that had proved the worth of subs, O-3 sailed to New London, Connecticut, to train Submarine School students.

When the US Navy adopted its hull classification system on 17 July 1920, she received the hull number SS-64.

Reclassified as a second-line submarine, on 25 July 1924, while at Coco Solo, Panama Canal Zone, and reverting to a first-liner on 6 June 1928, the vessel remained at New London, until she moved to the Philadelphia Navy Yard, to decommission on 6 June 1931.

As American involvement in World War II became imminent, O-3 recommissioned at Philadelphia, on 3 February 1941, and sailed to New London, in June, to train submarine personnel, at the submarine school there, until war's end. She then steamed to Portsmouth, New Hampshire, to decommission on 11 September 1945.

== Fate ==
She was struck from the Naval Vessel Register on 11 October 1945, and sold to John J. Duane Company, for scrapping, on 4 September 1946.

== Awards ==
- World War I Victory Medal
- American Defense Service Medal
- American Campaign Medal
- World War II Victory Medal

== Bibliography ==
- "Table 21 - Ships on Navy List June 30, 1919". Congressional Serial Set. U.S. Government Printing Office: 768. 1921.
- Gary, Priolo. "O-3 (SS-64)". Navsource.net.
- Friedman, Norman (1995). U.S. Submarines Through 1945: An Illustrated Design History. Annapolis, Maryland: Naval Institute Press. ISBN 1-55750-263-3.
- Gardiner, Robert & Gray, Randal (1985). Conway's All the World's Fighting Ships 1906–1921. Annapolis, Maryland: Naval Institute Press. ISBN 0-85177-245-5.
- "O-3". Dictionary of American Naval Fighting Ships. Navy Department, Naval History and Heritage Command. This article incorporates text from this source, which is in the public domain.
- Hall, Anne Martin (1925). Ships of the United States navy and their sponsors, 1913-1923.
