= USS O-13 =

O-class submarine of the United States

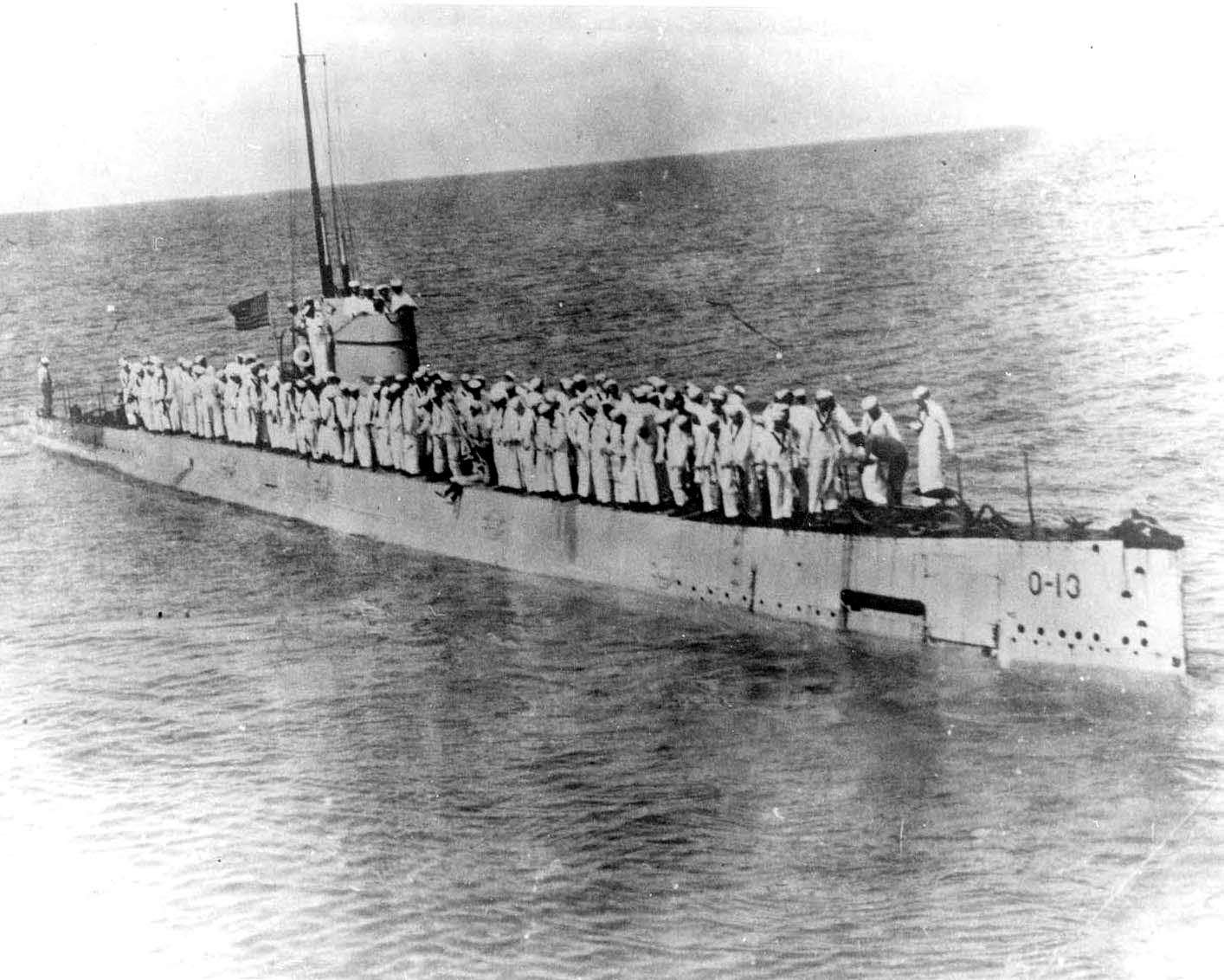
- USS O-13 in 1918, with crew in dress whites lined up on deck

History

United States
- Name: O-13
- Ordered: 3 March 1916
- Builder: Lake Torpedo Boat Company, Bridgeport, Connecticut
- Cost: $614,685.05 (hull and machinery)
- Laid down: 6 March 1916
- Launched: 27 December 1917
- Sponsored by: Miss Margaret Arletta Adams
- Commissioned: 27 November 1918
- Decommissioned: 11 June 1924
- Stricken: 9 May 1930
- Identification: Hull symbol: SS-74 (17 July 1920); Call sign: NEZN
- Fate: Sold for scrap, 30 July 1930

General characteristics
- Class & type: O-11-class submarine
- Displacement: 485 long tons (493 t) surfaced; 566 long tons (575 t) submerged
- Length: 175 ft (53 m)
- Beam: 16 ft 7 in (5.05 m)
- Draft: 13 ft 11 in (4.24 m)
- Installed power: 1,000 bhp (746 kW); 800 hp (597 kW)
- Propulsion: 2 × Busch-Sulzer diesel engines; 2 × Diehl Manufacture Company electric motors; 1 × 120-cell battery; 2 × shafts
- Speed: 14 kn surfaced; 11 kn (20 km/h; 13 mph) submerged
- Range: 5500 nmi at 11.5 kn surfaced; 250 nmi at 5 kn submerged
- Test depth: 200 ft
- Capacity: 18,588 US gal (70,360 L; 15,478 imp gal) fuel
- Complement: 2 officers; 27 enlisted
- Armament: 4 × 18 inch bow torpedo tubes (8 torpedoes); 1 × 3 in/23 caliber retractable deck gun

USS O-13 (SS-74), also known as "Submarine No. 74", was one of 16 O-class submarines of the United States Navy commissioned after the end of World War I.

== Design ==
The later O-boats, O-11 through O-16, were designed by the Lake Torpedo Boat Company, to different specifications from the earlier boats designed by Electric Boat. They did not perform as well, and are sometimes considered a separate class. The submarines had a length of 175 ft (53.3 m) overall, a beam of 16 ft 7 in (5.1 m), and a mean draft of 13 ft 11 in (4.2 m). They displaced 485 long tons (493 t) on the surface and 566 long tons (575 t) submerged. The O-class submarines had a crew of 2 officers and 27 enlisted men. They had a diving depth of 200 ft (61.0 m).

For surface running, the boats were powered by two 500-brake-horsepower (373 kW) Busch-Sulzer diesel engines, each driving one propeller shaft. When submerged each propeller was driven by a 370-horsepower (276 kW) Diehl Manufacture Company electric motor. They could reach 14 knots (26 km/h; 16 mph) on the surface and 11 kn (20 km/h; 13 mph) underwater. On the surface, the O class had a range of 5,500 nautical miles (10,200 km; 6,300 mi) at 11.5 kn (21.3 km/h; 13.2 mph).

The boats were armed with four 18-inch (450 mm) torpedo tubes in the bow. They carried four reloads, for a total of eight torpedoes. The O-class submarines were also armed with a single 3 in (76 mm)/23 caliber retractable deck gun.

== Construction ==
O-13's keel was laid down on 6 March 1916, by the Lake Torpedo Boat Company, in Bridgeport, Connecticut. She was launched 27 December 1917, sponsored by Miss Margaret Arletta Adams, and commissioned at the New York Navy Yard, on 27 November 1918.

== Service history ==
While conducting submerged trials in Long Island Sound, on 5 October 1918, prior to her commissioning, O-13 rammed Mary Alice, the section patrol boat that was accompanying her during a submerged circular run off Bridgeport, Connecticut, holing Mary Alice amidships. Although Mary Alice sank within minutes, O-13 rescued her entire crew.

O-13 operated along the coast of New Jersey and New York, until 8 October 1919, when she arrived at the Philadelphia Navy Yard, for a five-month overhaul. After returning to Cape May, New Jersey, on 8 March 1920, she departed on 1 April, for duty in the Caribbean Sea. Steaming via Key West, Florida, and Havana, Cuba, she arrived Coco Solo, in the Panama Canal Zone, on 30 April.

When the US Navy adopted its hull classification system on 17 July 1920, she received the hull number SS-74.

For over three years O-13 operated out of the Submarine Base, at Coco Solo, both in the Caribbean Sea, and in the Pacific Ocean. Cruises sent her to ports in Colombia, Ecuador, and Peru, while assigned to Submarine Division 10.

== Fate ==
She sailed on 15 October 1923, for the United States, arriving at Philadelphia, on 8 November. O-13 decommissioned there on 11 June 1924, after just five and a half years of service, and was placed in reserve. Her name was struck from the Naval Vessel Register on 9 May 1930, and her hull was sold for scrap on 30 July 1930.

== Bibliography ==
- "Table 21 - Ships on Navy List June 30, 1919". Congressional Serial Set. U.S. Government Printing Office: 769. 1921.
- Gary, Priolo. "O-13 (SS-74)". Navsource.net.
- Friedman, Norman (1995). U.S. Submarines Through 1945: An Illustrated Design History. Annapolis, Maryland: Naval Institute Press. ISBN 1-55750-263-3.
- Gardiner, Robert & Gray, Randal (1985). Conway's All the World's Fighting Ships 1906–1921. Annapolis, Maryland: Naval Institute Press. ISBN 0-85177-245-5.
- "O-13". Dictionary of American Naval Fighting Ships. Navy Department, Naval History and Heritage Command. 17 August 2015. This article incorporates text from this source, which is in the public domain.
- Hall, Anne Martin (1925). Ships of the United States navy and their sponsors, 1913-1923.
