= USS O-15 =

O-class submarine of the United States

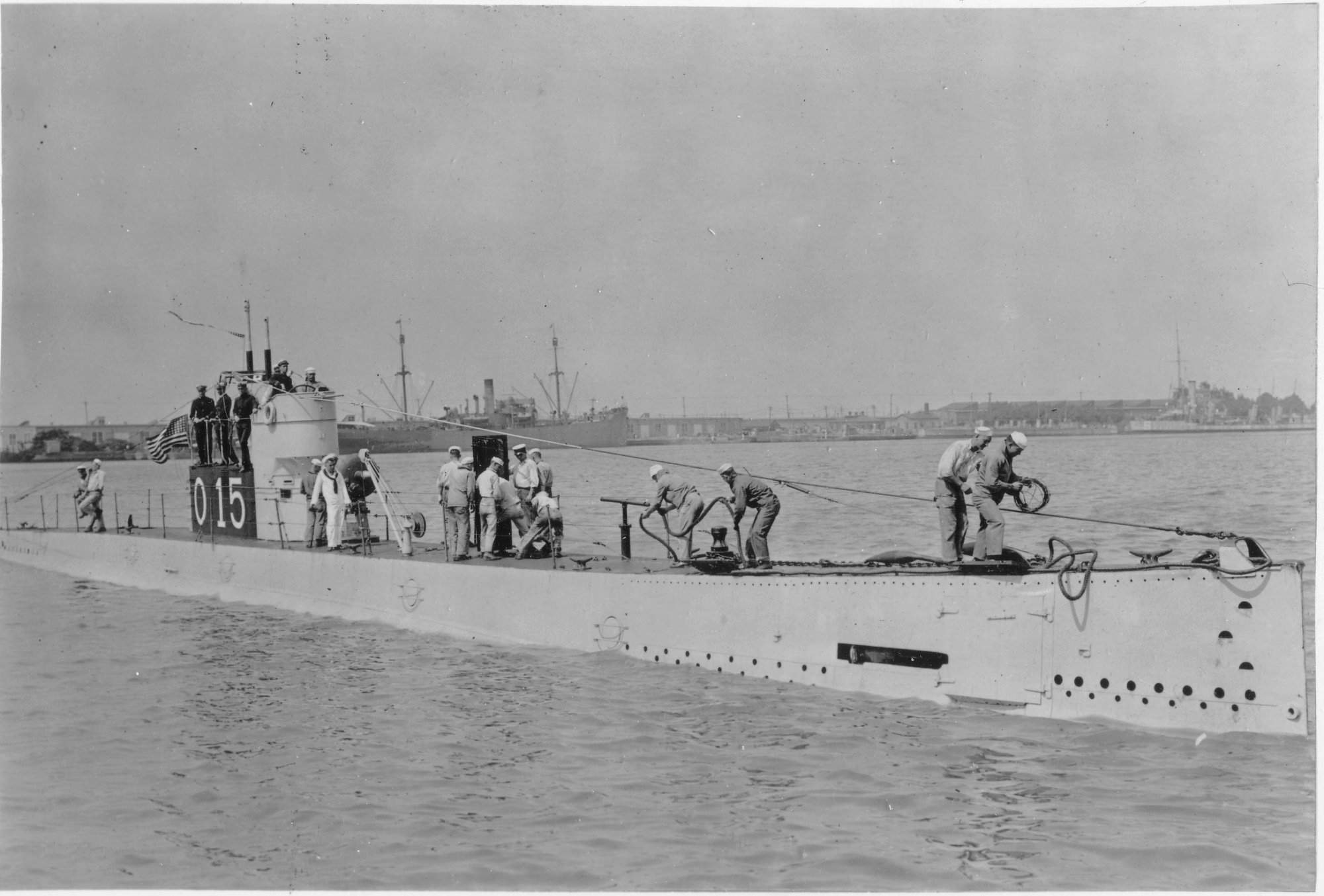
- USS O-15 at the Philadelphia Navy Yard, on 28 June 1919

History

United States
- Name: O-15
- Ordered: 3 March 1916
- Builder: California Shipbuilding Company, at the Craig Shipbuilding Company, in Long Beach, California
- Cost: $611,272.76 (hull and machinery)
- Laid down: 21 September 1916
- Launched: 12 February 1918
- Sponsored by: Mrs. James J. Murphy
- Commissioned: 27 August 1918
- Decommissioned: 11 June 1924
- Stricken: 9 May 1930
- Identification: Hull symbol: SS-76 (17 July 1920); Call sign: NAXS
- Fate: Sold for scrap, 30 July 1930

General characteristics
- Class & type: O-11-class submarine
- Displacement: 485 long tons (493 t) surfaced; 566 long tons (575 t) submerged
- Length: 175 ft (53 m)
- Beam: 16 ft 7 in (5.05 m)
- Draft: 13 ft 11 in (4.24 m)
- Installed power: 1,000 bhp (746 kW); 800 hp (597 kW)
- Propulsion: 2 × Busch-Sulzer diesel engines; 2 × Diehl Manufacture Company electric motors; 1 × 120-cell battery; 2 × shafts
- Speed: 14 kn surfaced; 11 kn (20 km/h; 13 mph) submerged
- Range: 5500 nmi at 11.5 kn surfaced; 250 nmi at 5 kn submerged
- Test depth: 200 ft
- Capacity: 18,588 US gal (70,360 L; 15,478 imp gal) fuel
- Complement: 2 officers; 27 enlisted
- Armament: 4 × 18 inch bow torpedo tubes (8 torpedoes); 1 × 3 in/23 caliber retractable deck gun

USS O-15 (SS-76), also known as "Submarine No. 76", was one of 16 O-class submarines of the United States Navy commissioned during World War I.

== Design ==
The later O-boats, O-11 through O-16, were designed by the Lake Torpedo Boat Company, to different specifications from the earlier boats designed by Electric Boat. They did not perform as well, and are sometimes considered a separate class. The submarines had a length of 175 ft (53.3 m) overall, a beam of 16 ft 7 in (5.1 m), and a mean draft of 13 ft 11 in (4.2 m). They displaced 485 long tons (493 t) on the surface and 566 long tons (575 t) submerged. The O-class submarines had a crew of 2 officers and 27 enlisted men. They had a diving depth of 200 ft (61.0 m).

For surface running, the boats were powered by two 500-brake-horsepower (373 kW) Busch-Sulzer diesel engines, each driving one propeller shaft. When submerged each propeller was driven by a 370-horsepower (276 kW) Diehl Manufacture Company electric motor. They could reach 14 knots (26 km/h; 16 mph) on the surface and 11 kn (20 km/h; 13 mph) underwater. On the surface, the O class had a range of 5,500 nautical miles (10,200 km; 6,300 mi) at 11.5 kn (21.3 km/h; 13.2 mph).

The boats were armed with four 18-inch (450 mm) torpedo tubes in the bow. They carried four reloads, for a total of eight torpedoes. The O-class submarines were also armed with a single 3 in (76 mm)/23 caliber retractable deck gun.

== Construction ==
O-15's keel was laid down on 21 September 1916, at the Craig Shipbuilding Company, in Long Beach, California, by the California Shipbuilding Company. She was launched on 12 February 1918, sponsored by Mrs. James J. Murphy, and completed at the Mare Island Navy Yard. O-15 was commissioned on 27 August 1918.

== Service history ==
Commissioning during the final months of World War I, O-15 saw brief war time service, on patrol along the Atlantic coast.

After the war, she reported to the Philadelphia Navy Yard, where machinists and electricians worked on her until 20 September 1919, when she was reduced to "in commission, in reserve", at Cape May, New Jersey.

She departed Philadelphia, in April 1920, and proceeded, via Jamaica, to Coco Solo, in the Panama Canal Zone, where she underwent overhaul and conducted experimental tests.

When the US Navy adopted its hull classification system on 17 July 1920, she received the hull number SS-76.

Conducting training cruises, she operated in and around Cuba, and the Virgin Islands, early in 1922, and returned to Coco Solo, in April.

== Fate ==
O-15 reported to Philadelphia, in November 1923, and decommissioned there 11 June 1924, after just five and a half years of service. Struck from the Naval Vessel Register on 9 May 1930, she was scrapped, under terms of the London Naval Treaty, on 30 July 1930.

== Bibliography ==
- "Table 21 - Ships on Navy List June 30, 1919". Congressional Serial Set. U.S. Government Printing Office: 769. 1921.
- Gary, Priolo. "O-15 (SS-76)". Navsource.net.
- Friedman, Norman (1995). U.S. Submarines Through 1945: An Illustrated Design History. Annapolis, Maryland: Naval Institute Press. ISBN 1-55750-263-3.
- Gardiner, Robert & Gray, Randal (1985). Conway's All the World's Fighting Ships 1906–1921. Annapolis, Maryland: Naval Institute Press. ISBN 0-85177-245-5.
- "O-15". Dictionary of American Naval Fighting Ships. Navy Department, Naval History and Heritage Command. 17 August 2015. This article incorporates text from this source, which is in the public domain.
- Hall, Anne Martin (1925). Ships of the United States navy and their sponsors, 1913-1923.
- Colton, Tim (12 December 2021). "Craig Shipbuilding, Long Beach, CA".
