= USS O-6 =

O-class submarine of the United States

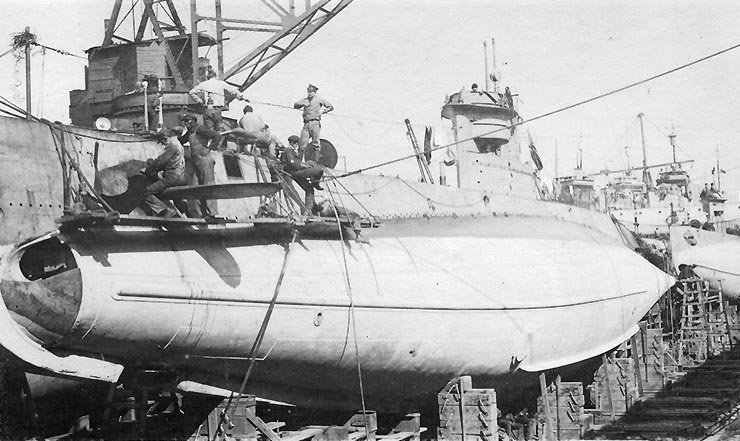
- USS O-6 in drydock with other O-boats at the Charleston Navy Yard, South Carolina, c. 1919

History

United States
- Name: O-6
- Ordered: 3 March 1916
- Builder: Fore River Shipbuilding Company, Quincy, Massachusetts
- Cost: $537,566.37 (hull and machinery)
- Laid down: 6 December 1916
- Launched: 25 November 1917
- Sponsored by: Mrs. Dessaline Wright
- Commissioned: 12 June 1918
- Decommissioned: 9 June 1931
- Recommissioned: 4 February 1941
- Decommissioned: 11 September 1945
- Stricken: 11 October 1945
- Identification: Hull symbol: SS-67 (17 July 1920); Call sign: NAMB
- Fate: Scrapped, 4 September 1946

General characteristics
- Class & type: O-1-class submarine
- Displacement: 520 long tons (528 t) surfaced; 629 long tons (639 t) submerged
- Length: 172 ft 4 in (52.53 m)
- Beam: 18 ft (5.5 m)
- Draft: 14 ft 5 in (4.39 m)
- Installed power: 880 bhp (656 kW) diesel; 740 hp (552 kW) electric
- Propulsion: 2 × NELSECO 6-EB-14 diesel engines; 2 × Electro-Dynamic Company electric motors; 2 × 60-cell batteries; 2 × Propellers
- Speed: 14 knots (26 km/h; 16 mph) surfaced; 10.5 knots (19.4 km/h; 12.1 mph) submerged
- Range: 5,500 nmi (10,200 km) at 11.5 kn (21.3 km/h; 13.2 mph) surfaced; 250 nmi (460 km) at 5 kn (9.3 km/h; 5.8 mph) submerged
- Test depth: 200 ft (61 m)
- Capacity: 21,897 US gal (82,890 L; 18,233 imp gal) fuel
- Complement: 2 officers; 27 enlisted
- Armament: 4 × 18 inch (450 mm) bow torpedo tubes (8 torpedoes); 1 × 3 in (76 mm)/23 caliber retractable deck gun

USS O-6 (SS-67), also known as "Submarine No. 67", was one of 16 O-class submarines of the United States Navy commissioned during World War I. She was recommissioned prior to the United States entry into WWII, for use as a trainer.

== Design ==
The O-1-class submarines were designed to meet a Navy requirement for coastal defense boats. The submarines had a length of 172 ft 4 in (52.5 m) overall, a beam of 18 ft 1 in (5.5 m), and a mean draft of 14 ft 5 in (4.4 m). They displaced 520 long tons (530 t) on the surface and 629 long tons (639 t) submerged. The O-class submarines had a crew of 2 officers and 27 enlisted men. They had a diving depth of 200 ft (61.0 m).

For surface running, the boats were powered by two 440-brake-horsepower (328 kW) NELSECO 6-EB-14 diesel engines, each driving one propeller shaft. When submerged each propeller was driven by a 370-horsepower (276 kW) Electro-Dynamic Company electric motor. They could reach 14 knots (26 km/h; 16 mph) on the surface and 10.5 kn (19.4 km/h; 12.1 mph) underwater. On the surface, the O-class had a range of 5,500 nautical miles (10,200 km; 6,300 mi) at 11.5 kn (21.3 km/h; 13.2 mph).

The boats were armed with four 18-inch (450 mm) torpedo tubes in the bow. They carried four reloads, for a total of eight torpedoes. The O-class submarines were also armed with a single 3 in (76 mm)/23 caliber retractable deck gun.

== Construction ==
O-6's keel was laid down on 6 December 1916, by the Fore River Shipbuilding Company, in Quincy, Massachusetts. She was launched on 25 November 1917, sponsored by Mrs. Carroll Q. Wright, and commissioned at Boston, Massachusetts, on 12 June 1918.

== Service history ==
=== World War I ===
The United States had already entered World War I by the time O-6 was commissioned, and she operated from Philadelphia, Pennsylvania, on coastal patrol along the East Coast, hunting Imperial German Navy U-boats from Cape Cod, in Massachusetts, to Key West, in Florida.

O-6 was the target in a friendly fire incident in the Atlantic Ocean, in August 1918. On 6 August 1918, she departed Hampton Roads, Virginia, as one of the escorts for a convoy of five troop transports. With orders to escort the convoy for one day, she followed the convoy on the surface at a distance of two nautical miles (3.7 km; 2.3 mi), maintaining a speed of 12.5 knots (23.2 km/h; 14.4 mph). During the night of 6–7 August, she lost sight of the convoy in the darkness. After sunrise on 7 August 1918, she followed the expected track of the convoy, expecting to catch up with it. On the afternoon of 7 August, she sighted ships ahead which she assumed belonged to the convoy she was escorting. After following the ships for 15 minutes, she realized that they did not belong to her convoy and that she was in fact following a convoy of 28 cargo ships. At 15:00, when she was about to turn away and head for port at the Delaware Breakwater, in accordance with her orders, the last ship in the convoy, the American armed cargo ship Jason, which was slightly behind the rest of the convoy's ships, sighted her and mistook her for a German submarine with a mast and sail set. US Navy gunners aboard Jason opened fire on O-6 with Jason's 5-inch (127 mm) gun at a range of 3,000 yards (1.7 mi; 2.7 km). Jason fired eight rounds, scoring five hits. After the first hit, O-6 attempted to dive, but the second hit struck her conning tower and started leaks that made it impossible for her to submerge. O-6 blew her ballast tanks and returned to the surface. She flashed recognition signals by blinker light and members of her crew waved a United States flag on her deck. Jason reported that O-6 fired six shots from her deck gun at Jason, apparently misinterpreting O-6's recognition signals as gun flashes. Another of the convoy's cargo ships also opened fire, and shell splashes from that ship's gunfire fell short of O-6, this may have appeared to Jason's crew and gunners to have come from O-6. O-6 stopped, and Jason ceased fire as she steamed out of range of O-6. One of the convoy's escorts, the US Navy destroyer Paul Jones, had meanwhile, reversed course and approached Jason, which signaled that she had a submarine in sight. Paul Jones then closed with O-6 and opened 3-inch (76 mm) gunfire, but all of her shots fell short, and she ceased fire when she closed to a range of 3,000 yards (1.7 mi; 2.7 km) and saw that O-6 was flying a US flag from her conning tower. Paul Jones came alongside O-6 to render assistance. O-6 suffered no casualties, but she had sustained serious damage, including to her compasses, which had been knocked out, and her steering gear. Paul Jones escorted her to port at the Delaware Breakwater, where they arrived on 8 August 1918.

O-6 received a commendation for her crew's conduct during the incident. Lieutenant Wright was promoted to lieutenant commander on 15 August 1918, and later was awarded a Navy Distinguished Service Medal, the citation for which says, "The courage and coolness with which Lieutenant Commander Wright handled his vessel under these very trying conditions undoubtedly saved the ship and crew." In his report of the affair to United States Secretary of the Navy Josephus Daniels, O-6's submarine division commander wrote, "It is believed that recognition should be made of the exceedingly efficient gunnery work of the merchant vessel in question, in that she got on so quickly, and held a difficult target under the circumstances of possible enemy attack." Jason at first was misidentified as a British merchant ship, but her actual identity later was established. Her gun crew had fired with great accuracy at long range, and the commander of her Navy gun crew was awarded a Navy Cross, the citation crediting Jason with an engagement with an enemy submarine.

On 2 November 1918, O-6 departed Newport, Rhode Island, in a 20-submarine contingent bound for service in European waters. but the armistice with Germany of 11 November 1918, brought World War I to an end before the submarines reached the Azores. They returned to the United States.

=== 1919–1941 ===
After World War I, O-6 operated as a training ship from Naval Submarine Base New London at Groton, Connecticut. When the US Navy adopted its hull classification system on 17 July 1920, she received the hull number SS-67. Reclassified as a second-line submarine on 25 July 1924, while stationed at Coco Solo, in the Panama Canal Zone, she reverted to first-line status on 6 June 1928, and continued to operate from New London, until February 1929, when she proceeded to Philadelphia. She was decommissioned there on 9 June 1931.

As US involvement in World War II approached, the US Navy (USN) began to recommission old submarines for use as training ships. O-6 recommissioned at Philadelphia, on 4 February 1941, then returned to New London, to train students at the Submarine School. On 19 June 1941, she made a trial run to Portsmouth, New Hampshire. The next day, the submarine O-9 sank 15 nmi (28 km; 17 mi) off Portsmouth. O-6 joined the submarines O-10 and Triton and other vessels in the search for O-9, but to no avail.

=== World War II ===
O-6 remained in the Portsmouth area. The United States entered World War II on 7 December 1941, and she carried out training duties from Portsmouth, through the end of the war, which concluded with the surrender of Japan on 15 August 1945.

== Fate ==
O-6 was decommissioned at Portsmouth, on 11 September 1945. She was struck from the Naval Vessel Register the same day, and was sold to the John J. Duane Company, of Quincy, Massachusetts, on 4 September 1946. She was scrapped in December 1946.

== Awards ==
- World War I Victory Medal
- American Defense Service Medal
- American Campaign Medal
- World War II Victory Medal

== Bibliography ==
- "Table 21 - Ships on Navy List June 30, 1919". Congressional Serial Set. U.S. Government Printing Office: 768. 1921.
- Mohl, Michael. "O-6 (SS-67)". Navsource.net.
- Friedman, Norman (1995). U.S. Submarines Through 1945: An Illustrated Design History. Annapolis, Maryland: Naval Institute Press. ISBN 1-55750-263-3.
- Gardiner, Robert & Gray, Randal (1985). Conway's All the World's Fighting Ships 1906–1921. Annapolis, Maryland: Naval Institute Press. ISBN 0-85177-245-5.
- "O-6". Dictionary of American Naval Fighting Ships. Navy Department, Naval History and Heritage Command. This article incorporates text from this source, which is in the public domain.
- Hall, Anne Martin (1925). Ships of the United States navy and their sponsors, 1913-1923.
- Doughty, Leonard Jr Lieutenant Commander (October 1934). "Mistaken Attacks in the World War". Proceedings.
