= United States O-class submarine =

United States Navy submarine class

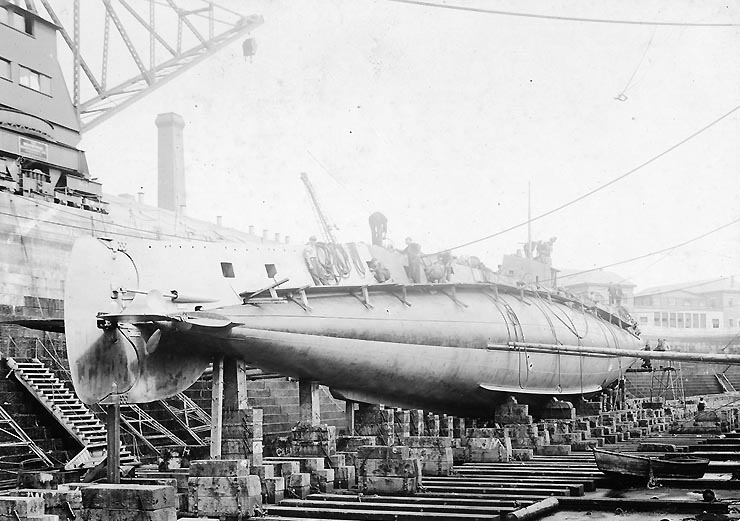
- USS O-1, lead ship of her class, in dry dock, at Portsmouth Navy Yard, on 5 September 1918

Class overview
- Name: O class
- Builders: Portsmouth Navy Yard (O-1); Puget Sound Navy Yard (O-2); Fore River Shipyard (O-3 to O-10); Lake Torpedo Boat Company (O-11 to O-13); California Shipbuilding Company (O-14 to O-16)
- Operators: United States Navy
- Preceded by: N class
- Succeeded by: R class
- Built: 1916–1918
- In commission: 1918–1931; 1941–1946
- Completed: 16
- Lost: 3 (1 scuttled)
- Scrapped: 13

General characteristics
- Class & type: O-1-class (O-1 to O-10)
- Type: Submarine
- Displacement: 520 long tons (528 t) surfaced; 629 long tons (639 t) submerged
- Length: 172 ft 4 in (52.53 m)
- Beam: 18 ft (5.5 m)
- Draft: 14 ft 5 in (4.39 m)
- Installed power: 880 bhp (656 kW) diesel; 740 hp (552 kW) electric
- Propulsion: 2 × NELSECO 6-EB-14 diesel engines; 2 × New York Navy Yard (O-1-O-5) or Electro-Dynamic Company (O-6-O-10) electric motors; 2 × 60-cell batteries; 2 × Propellers
- Speed: 14 knots (26 km/h; 16 mph) surfaced; 10.5 knots (19.4 km/h; 12.1 mph) submerged
- Range: 5,500 nmi (10,200 km) at 11.5 kn (21.3 km/h; 13.2 mph) surfaced; 250 nmi (460 km) at 5 kn (9.3 km/h; 5.8 mph) submerged
- Test depth: 200 ft (61 m)
- Complement: 2 officers; 27 enlisted
- Armament: 4 × 18 inch (450 mm) bow torpedo tubes (8 torpedoes); 1 × 3 in (76 mm)/23 caliber retractable deck gun

General characteristics
- Class & type: O-11-class (O-11 to O-16)
- Type: Submarine
- Displacement: 485 long tons (493 t) surfaced; 566 long tons (575 t) submerged
- Length: 175 ft (53 m)
- Beam: 16 ft 7 in (5.05 m)
- Draft: 13 ft 11 in (4.24 m)
- Installed power: 1,000 bhp (746 kW); 800 hp (597 kW)
- Propulsion: 2 × Busch-Sulzer diesel engines; 2 × Diehl Manufacture Company electric motors; 1 × 120-cell battery; 2 × shafts
- Speed: 14 kn surfaced; 11 kn (20 km/h; 13 mph) submerged
- Range: 5500 nmi at 11.5 kn surfaced; 250 nmi at 5 kn submerged
- Test depth: 200 ft
- Complement: 2 officers; 27 enlisted
- Armament: 4 × 18 inch bow torpedo tubes (8 torpedoes); 1 × 3 in/23 caliber retractable deck gun

The United States O-class submarines were a class of sixteen coastal patrol submarines laid down for the United States Navy (USN) just before, and just after, the United States entry into World War I. The USN used two different designs by two different builders, the O-1-class, built by the Electric Boat Company, of Groton, Connecticut, and the O-11-class, built by the Lake Torpedo Boat Company, of Bridgeport, Connecticut. The O-1-class served during WWI, and seven were recommissioned as training boats during World War II. The O-11-class were all decommissioned in June 1924, and most were scrapped in 1930.

== Description ==
Following the design trend of the day, these boats were scaled up versions of the preceding L class, reversing the fiscally created shrinkage in size of the N-class. The O-class were about 80 long tons (81 t) larger than the L-class, with greater power and endurance for wider ranging patrols. Due to the American entry into World War I the O-class were built much more rapidly than previous classes, and were all commissioned in 1918. O-1 through O-10, referred to as the O-1-class, were designed by the Electric Boat Company (EB), and O-11 through O-16, referred to as the O-11-class, were designed by the Lake Torpedo Boat Company, and differed considerably from the EB design. All had the same military characteristics and performance and thus were considered by the Navy to be the same class. The EB design boats had a spindle shaped hull with an axially mounted rudder and twin lateral mounted propeller shafts. The bow diving planes controlled depth with the stern diving planes (mounted laterally behind the propellers) controlling the boat's angle while submerged. The Lake design also had a spindle shaped hull, but the rudder was ventrally mounted under the flat shovel-shaped stern with the propeller shafts also exiting the hull ventrally.

The EB design reverted to the semi-hemispherical rotating bow cap that covered the four 18-inch (450 mm) diameter torpedo tubes. Although a common feature on earlier EB submarines, this would prove to be the last of the EB designs with the cap. The Lake design used individual muzzle doors with hydro-dynamic shutters to seal the tubes, a feature that would become standard on all later USN submarines. These boats were big enough to have a semi-retractable 3 in (76 mm)/23 caliber deck gun forward of the conning tower fairwater. This gun partially retracted into a vertical watertight cylinder that penetrated the pressure hull into the forward battery compartment (EB design), or the control room (Lake design). When retracted the circular gun shield formed the top of the cylinder with only the barrel of the gun protruding above deck.

The Lake design retained Simon Lake's trademark amidships diving planes, theoretically used to enable zero-angle, or "even-keel" diving. This was a marked contrast to the angled-diving technique used by the EB design boats. Zero-angle diving proved to be unworkable and Lake used it here for the last time. His design for the follow-on R-class boats would abandon the method in favor of the EB angle-diving arrangement.

The USN obtained a legal license to build two of the EB design boats at government owned Navy Yards: O-1 by the Portsmouth Navy Yard, in Kittery, Maine, and O-2 by the Puget Sound Navy Yard, in Bremerton, Washington. O-3 through O-10, of the EB design, were built by the Fore River Shipyard, in Quincy, Massachusetts. O-11 through O-13, were Lake design, built by the Lake Torpedo Boat Company, of Bridgeport, Connecticut. Once again, desirous of having submarines built at a west coast yard, the Navy got Lake to build the O-14 through O-16, at a sub-contractor named California Shipbuilding Company, not to be confused with the California Shipbuilding Corporation, at the Craig Shipbuilding Company, in Long Beach, California. California Shipbuilding suffered from numerous management and production issues and all three boats assigned to them had to be towed up the coast to the Mare Island Naval Shipyard, north of San Francisco, in Vallejo, California, for completion.

== Service ==
The class originally operated in the anti-submarine role off the United States' East Coast. Two of the boats, O-4 and O-6, mistakenly came under fire from a British merchant ship in the Atlantic on 24 July 1918. The steamer scored six hits on O-4's conning tower fairwater and pressure hull before her identity was discovered. O-4 suffered minor damage caused by shell splinters. The boats O-3 to O-10 formed part of the twenty-strong submarine force that left Newport, Rhode Island, on 2 November 1918, for the Azores, but the task force was recalled after the Armistice was signed nine days later.

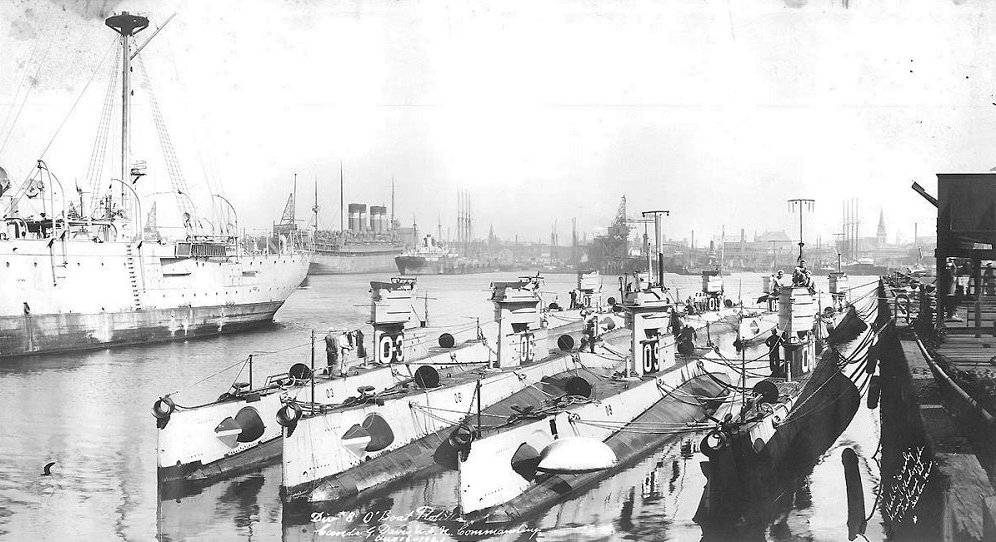
Nine O-class submarines from Submarine Division 8, at Boston, 1921

The Lake design boats, O-11 through O-16, built by the Lake Torpedo Boat Company and California Shipbuilding Company, suffered from electrical, structural, and mechanical problems. O-11 was immediately sent to the Philadelphia Navy Yard for a five-month overhaul. In October 1918, O-13 sank the patrol boat Mary Alice in a collision while she was submerged. O-15 also underwent a refit but was sent into reserve soon after, before she went into service, at Coco Solo, in the Panama Canal Zone. This also involved another overhaul. O-16 underwent a refit soon after commissioning, and later suffered a fire in her conning tower, in December 1919. All six of the Lake design boats were decommissioned in July 1924, with five being scrapped in July 1930, under the terms of the London Naval Treaty. However, the decommissioned O-12 was leased back to Simon Lake, for use in an Arctic expedition, by Sir Hubert Wilkins. Disarmed, she was rebuilt with specialized Arctic exploration equipment and renamed Nautilus. After the conclusion of the expedition she was scuttled in a Norwegian fjord, in November 1931, to keep within the provisions of the lease agreement, as the Navy no longer wanted her but didn't want the boat to fall into foreign hands.

The EB design boats served well, although O-5 was rammed by a cargo ship and sunk, near the Panama Canal, on 28 October 1923, with the loss of three crew members. All nine of the surviving EB design boats were decommissioned into reserve status in 1931. The harsh economics of the Great Depression prevented proper pre-layup maintenance, and very little, if any work, was done on the boats during the nine years they laid in reserve at the Philadelphia Naval Shipyard.

In 1929–1930, the EB design O-class boats were modified for improved safety in the event of sinking. This was work prompted by the loss of the S-4 in 1927. Two marker buoys were added fore and aft. In the event the submarine was stranded on the bottom the buoys could be released to show the submarine's position. A motor room escape hatch was also added, the motor room being the aft most compartment. The tapered after dorsal skeg became a step as a result of these modifications.

Eight of the boats, O-1 had been scrapped in 1938, were refitted and recommissioned in 1941, to serve as training boats based at the Naval Submarine Base New London, in Connecticut. The looming war emergency forced the work to be rushed, and many of the eight O-class still needed thorough maintenance, after being recommissioned. O-9 sank during deep submergence trials in June 1941, likely due to her poor material condition. Thirty-three of her crew were lost.

The 18-inch torpedo tubes of this class forced the Navy to retain the old Mark 7 torpedo, solely for the use by these boats. All other 18-inch torpedoes prior to the 21-inch (533mm) Mark 8 were discarded before WWII as a cost saving measure.

During World War II, the seven remaining O boats were stationed at the New London Submarine Base, and served as training platforms for the Submarine School. The last O-boat, O-4, was decommissioned in September 1945. O-4 had served for 27 years and was, at that time, the longest serving submarine in the history of the US Navy.

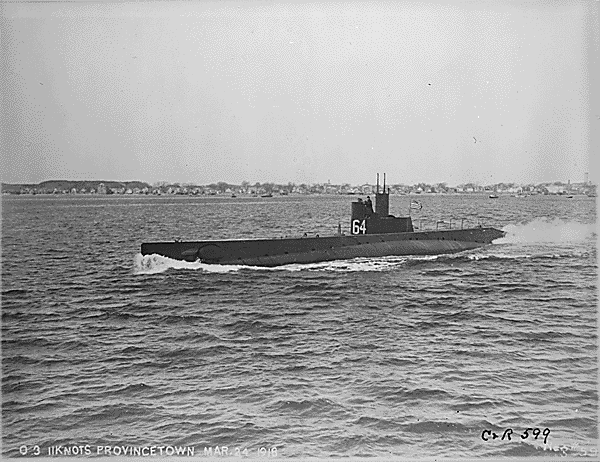
O-3 underway, 1918

== Boats in class ==
The 16 submarines of the O class were:

| Ship name | Hull class and no. | Builder | Laid down | Launched | Comm. | Decomm. | Reclass. hull no. | Reclass. hull no. date | Fate |
|---|---|---|---|---|---|---|---|---|---|
| O-1 | Submarine No. 62 | Portsmouth Navy Yard | 26 March 1917 | 9 October 1918 | 5 November 1918 | 11 June 1931 | SS-62 | 17 July 1920 | Scrapped 1938 |
| O-2 | Submarine No. 63 | Puget Sound Navy Yard | 27 July 1917 | 24 May 1918 | 19 October 1918 | 26 July 1945 | SS-63 | 17 July 1920 | Scrapped 1945 |
| O-3 | Submarine No. 64 | Fore River Shipbuilding, Quincy, Massachusetts | 2 December 1916 | 27 September 1917 | 13 June 1918 | 11 September 1945 | SS-64 | 17 July 1920 | Scrapped 1946 |
| O-4 | Submarine No. 65 | Fore River Shipbuilding, Quincy, Massachusetts | 4 December 1916 | 20 October 1917 | 29 May 1918 | 20 September 1945 | SS-65 | 17 July 1920 | Scrapped 1946 |
| O-5 | Submarine No. 66 | Fore River Shipbuilding, Quincy, Massachusetts | 8 December 1916 | 11 November 1917 | 8 June 1918 | —N/a | SS-66 | 17 July 1920 | Lost in a collision 28 October 1923; raised and scrapped 1924 |
| O-6 | Submarine No. 67 | Fore River Shipbuilding, Quincy, Massachusetts | 6 December 1916 | 25 November 1917 | 12 June 1918 | 11 September 1945 | SS-67 | 17 July 1920 | Scrapped 1946 |
| O-7 | Submarine No. 68 | Fore River Shipbuilding, Quincy, Massachusetts | 14 February 1917 | 16 December 1917 | 4 July 1918 | 2 July 1945 | SS-68 | 17 July 1920 | Scrapped 1946 |
| O-8 | Submarine No. 69 | Fore River Shipbuilding, Quincy, Massachusetts | 27 February 1917 | 31 December 1917 | 11 July 1918 | 11 September 1945 | SS-69 | 17 July 1920 | Scrapped 1946 |
| O-9 | Submarine No. 70 | Fore River Shipbuilding, Quincy, Massachusetts | 15 February 1917 | 27 January 1918 | 27 July 1918 | —N/a | SS-70 | 17 July 1920 | Lost on a test dive 20 June 1941; wreckage located in 1997 |
| O-10 | Submarine No. 71 | Fore River Shipbuilding, Quincy, Massachusetts | 27 February 1917 | 21 February 1918 | 17 August 1918 | 10 September 1945 | SS-71 | 17 July 1920 | Scrapped 1946 |
| O-11 | Submarine No. 72 | Lake Torpedo Boat Company, Bridgeport, Connecticut | 6 March 1916 | 29 October 1917 | 19 October 1918 | 21 June 1924 | SS-72 | 17 July 1920 | Scrapped 1930 |
| O-12 | Submarine No. 73 | Lake Torpedo Boat Company, Bridgeport, Connecticut | 6 March 1916 | 29 September 1917 | 18 October 1918 | 17 June 1924 | SS-73 | 17 July 1920 | Civilian Arctic expedition vessel; scuttled 1931 |
| O-13 | Submarine No. 74 | Lake Torpedo Boat Company, Bridgeport, Connecticut | 6 March 1916 | 27 December 1917 | 27 November 1918 | 11 June 1924 | SS-74 | 17 July 1920 | Scrapped 1930 |
| O-14 | Submarine No. 75 | California Shipbuilding Company, Long Beach, California | 6 July 1916 | 6 May 1918 | 1 October 1918 | 17 June 1924 | SS-75 | 17 July 1920 | Scrapped 1930 |
| O-15 | Submarine No. 76 | California Shipbuilding Company, Long Beach, California | 21 September 1916 | 12 February 1918 | 27 August 1918 | 11 June 1924 | SS-76 | 17 July 1920 | Scrapped 1930 |
| O-16 | Submarine No. 77 | California Shipbuilding Company, Long Beach, California | 7 October 1916 | 9 February 1918 | 1 August 1918 | 21 June 1924 | SS-77 | 17 July 1920 | Scrapped 1930 |

== See also ==
- List of lost United States submarines
- List of United States submarine classes

== Bibliography ==
- Friedman, Norman (1995). US Submarines through 1945: An Illustrated Design History. Annapolis, Maryland: Naval Institute Press. ISBN 1-55750-263-3.
- Christley, Jim (2011). US Submarines 1900-35. Osprey Publishing. ISBN 978-1-84908-185-6.
- Hedman, Ric; Johnston, David (19 October 2025). "O-class Design and Construction Notes". Pigboats.com.
- Colton, Tim (12 December 2021). "Craig Shipbuilding". ShipbuildingHistory.com.
- Hedman, Ric; Johnston, David (24 October 2025a). "Wilkins Expedition page". Pigboats.com.
- Hedman, Ric; Johnston, David (18 June 2025b). "Notable Submarine Accidents page". Pigboats.com.
- "O-13". Dictionary of American Naval Fighting Ships. Navy Department, Naval History and Heritage Command. 17 August 2015. This article incorporates text from this source, which is in the public domain.
