= O10 =

O10 or O-10 may refer to:

- Loening O-10, an amphibious observation aircraft of the United States Army Air Corps
- HNLMS O 10, a submarine of the Royal Netherlands Navy
- USS O-10 (SS-71), a submarine of the United States Navy
- O-10, a pay grade in the United States armed forces; see Uniformed services pay grades of the United States
