= USS O-4 =

O-class submarine of the United States

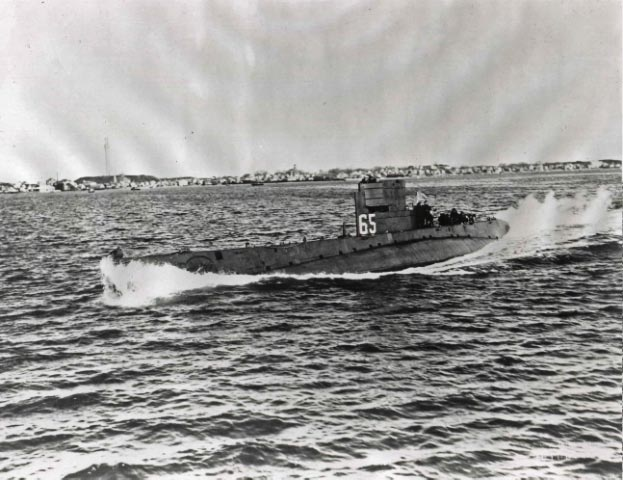
- USS O-4 doing 14 kn (26 km/h; 16 mph) off Provincetown, Massachusetts, 23 March 1918

History

United States
- Name: O-4
- Ordered: 3 March 1916
- Builder: Fore River Shipbuilding Company, Quincy, Massachusetts
- Cost: $562,341.45 (hull and machinery)
- Laid down: 4 December 1916
- Launched: 20 October 1917
- Sponsored by: Mrs. Maud Williams
- Commissioned: 29 May 1918
- Decommissioned: 3 June 1931
- Recommissioned: 29 January 1941
- Decommissioned: 20 September 1945
- Stricken: 11 October 1945
- Identification: Hull symbol: SS-65 (17 July 1920); Call sign: NAMX
- Fate: Scrapped, 1 February 1946

General characteristics
- Class & type: O-1-class submarine
- Displacement: 520 long tons (528 t) surfaced; 629 long tons (639 t) submerged
- Length: 172 ft 4 in (52.53 m)
- Beam: 18 ft (5.5 m)
- Draft: 14 ft 5 in (4.39 m)
- Installed power: 880 bhp (656 kW) diesel; 740 hp (552 kW) electric
- Propulsion: 2 × NELSECO 6-EB-14 diesel engines; 2 × New York Navy Yard electric motors; 2 × 60-cell batteries; 2 × Propellers
- Speed: 14 knots (26 km/h; 16 mph) surfaced; 10.5 knots (19.4 km/h; 12.1 mph) submerged
- Range: 5,500 nmi (10,200 km) at 11.5 kn (21.3 km/h; 13.2 mph) surfaced; 250 nmi (460 km) at 5 kn (9.3 km/h; 5.8 mph) submerged
- Test depth: 200 ft (61 m)
- Capacity: 21,897 US gal (82,890 L; 18,233 imp gal) fuel
- Complement: 2 officers; 27 enlisted
- Armament: 4 × 18 inch (450 mm) bow torpedo tubes (8 torpedoes); 1 × 3 in (76 mm)/23 caliber retractable deck gun

USS O-4 (SS-65), also known as "Submarine No. 65", was one of 16 O-class submarines of the United States Navy commissioned during World War I. She was recommissioned prior to the United States entry into WWII, for use as a trainer.

== Design ==
The O-1-class submarines were designed to meet a Navy requirement for coastal defense boats. The submarines had a length of 172 ft 4 in (52.5 m) overall, a beam of 18 ft 1 in (5.5 m), and a mean draft of 14 ft 5 in (4.4 m). They displaced 520 long tons (530 t) on the surface and 629 long tons (639 t) submerged. The O-class submarines had a crew of 2 officers and 27 enlisted men. They had a diving depth of 200 ft (61.0 m).

For surface running, the boats were powered by two 440-brake-horsepower (328 kW) NELSECO 6-EB-14 diesel engines, each driving one propeller shaft. When submerged each propeller was driven by a 370-horsepower (276 kW) New York Navy Yard electric motor. They could reach 14 knots (26 km/h; 16 mph) on the surface and 10.5 kn (19.4 km/h; 12.1 mph) underwater. On the surface, the O-class had a range of 5,500 nautical miles (10,200 km; 6,300 mi) at 11.5 kn (21.3 km/h; 13.2 mph).

The boats were armed with four 18-inch (450 mm) torpedo tubes in the bow. They carried four reloads, for a total of eight torpedoes. The O-class submarines were also armed with a single 3 in (76 mm)/23 caliber retractable deck gun.

== Construction ==
O-4's keel was laid down on 4 December 1916, by the Fore River Shipbuilding Company, in Quincy, Massachusetts. She was launched on 20 October 1917, sponsored by Mrs. Maud Williams, and commissioned on 29 May 1918.

== Service history ==
O-4 operated out of Philadelphia, Pennsylvania, during World War I, and patrolled the US Atlantic coast from Cape Cod, in Massachusetts, to Key West, in Florida.

On 24 July 1918, a British steamer mistook O-4 and O-6 for German U-boats and fired on the submarines. Although O-4 received six hits from the steamer, she suffered no major damage. In November, she joined the 20-submarine contingent that departed Newport, Rhode Island, on 3 November for European waters, however, hostilities ceased before the boats had reached the Azores.

O-4 then sailed to New London, Connecticut, to train students at the Submarine School there.

When the US Navy adopted its hull classification system on 17 July 1920, she received the hull number SS-65.

Reclassified to a second-line submarine on 26 July 1924, and reverting to a first-liner on 6 June 1928, she trained Submarine School students at New London until 1931, with the exception of a brief tour at Coco Solo, Panama Canal Zone. O-4 decommissioned on 3 June 1931.

The approach of World War II saw the recall of O-4 to active service. She recommissioned on 29 January 1941 and trained students at the Submarine School until war's end.

== Fate ==
After the war, she steamed to Portsmouth, New Hampshire, to decommission there on 20 September 1945. She was struck from the Naval Vessel Register on 11 October 1945, and scrapped on 1 February 1946.

== Length of service ==
Following the decommissioning of the submarines N-1, N-2, and N-3, in April 1926, O-4 was the oldest submarine in active service with the United States Navy, until her final decommissioning in September 1945. Although O-4 was fourth boat numerically in the O-class, she was the first commissioned. O-4 held the distinction of being the US Navy's submarine in service for the longest period of time, 27 years 4 months, until surpassed by Picuda in February 1971.

== Awards ==
- World War I Victory Medal
- American Defense Service Medal
- American Campaign Medal
- World War II Victory Medal

== Bibliography ==
- "Table 21 - Ships on Navy List June 30, 1919". Congressional Serial Set. U.S. Government Printing Office: 768. 1921.
- Gary, Priolo. "O-4 (SS-65)". Navsource.net.
- Friedman, Norman (1995). U.S. Submarines Through 1945: An Illustrated Design History. Annapolis, Maryland: Naval Institute Press. ISBN 1-55750-263-3.
- Gardiner, Robert & Gray, Randal (1985). Conway's All the World's Fighting Ships 1906–1921. Annapolis, Maryland: Naval Institute Press. ISBN 0-85177-245-5.
- "O-4". Dictionary of American Naval Fighting Ships. Navy Department, Naval History and Heritage Command. This article incorporates text from this source, which is in the public domain.
- Hall, Anne Martin (1925). Ships of the United States navy and their sponsors, 1913-1923.
