= USS O-10 =

O-class submarine of the United States

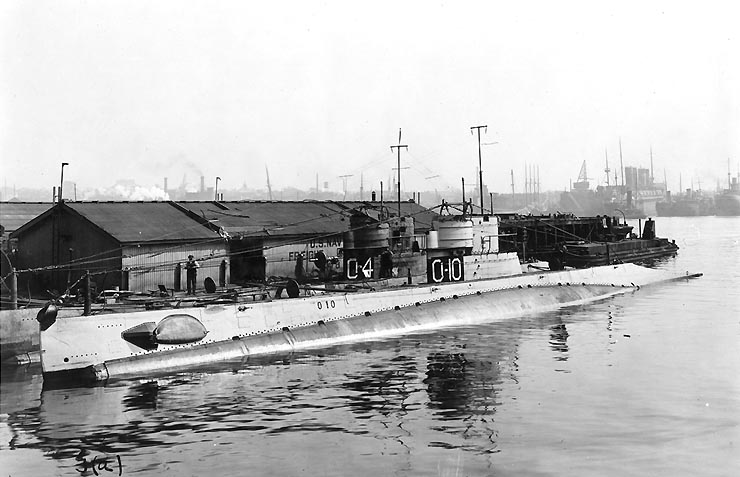
- USS O-10 at the Boston Navy Yard, on 28 September 1922, USS O-4 is moored inboard of O-10

History

United States
- Name: O-10
- Ordered: 3 March 1916
- Builder: Fore River Shipbuilding Company, Quincy, Massachusetts
- Cost: $550,179.58 (hull and machinery)
- Laid down: 27 February 1917
- Launched: 21 February 1918
- Sponsored by: Mrs. Bertha Bailey
- Commissioned: 17 August 1918
- Decommissioned: 25 June 1931
- Recommissioned: 10 March 1941
- Decommissioned: 10 September 1945
- Stricken: 11 October 1945
- Identification: Hull symbol: SS-71 (17 July 1920); Call sign: NAXT
- Fate: Sold for scrap, 21 August 1946

General characteristics
- Class & type: O-1-class submarine
- Displacement: 520 long tons (528 t) surfaced; 629 long tons (639 t) submerged
- Length: 172 ft 4 in (52.53 m)
- Beam: 18 ft (5.5 m)
- Draft: 14 ft 5 in (4.39 m)
- Installed power: 880 bhp (656 kW) diesel; 740 hp (552 kW) electric
- Propulsion: 2 × NELSECO 6-EB-14 diesel engines; 2 × Electro-Dynamic Company electric motors; 2 × 60-cell batteries; 2 × Propellers
- Speed: 14 knots (26 km/h; 16 mph) surfaced; 10.5 knots (19.4 km/h; 12.1 mph) submerged
- Range: 5,500 nmi (10,200 km) at 11.5 kn (21.3 km/h; 13.2 mph) surfaced; 250 nmi (460 km) at 5 kn (9.3 km/h; 5.8 mph) submerged
- Test depth: 200 ft (61 m)
- Capacity: 21,897 US gal (82,890 L; 18,233 imp gal) fuel
- Complement: 2 officers; 27 enlisted
- Armament: 4 × 18 inch (450 mm) bow torpedo tubes (8 torpedoes); 1 × 3 in (76 mm)/23 caliber retractable deck gun

USS O-10 (SS-71), also known as "Submarine No. 71", was one of 16 O-class submarines of the United States Navy commissioned during World War I. She was recommissioned prior to the United States entry into WWII, for use as a trainer.

== Design ==
The O-1-class submarines were designed to meet a Navy requirement for coastal defense boats. The submarines had a length of 172 ft 4 in (52.5 m) overall, a beam of 18 ft 1 in (5.5 m), and a mean draft of 14 ft 5 in (4.4 m). They displaced 520 long tons (530 t) on the surface and 629 long tons (639 t) submerged. The O-class submarines had a crew of 2 officers and 27 enlisted men. They had a diving depth of 200 ft (61.0 m).

For surface running, the boats were powered by two 440-brake-horsepower (328 kW) NELSECO 6-EB-14 diesel engines, each driving one propeller shaft. When submerged each propeller was driven by a 370-horsepower (276 kW) Electro-Dynamic Company electric motor. They could reach 14 knots (26 km/h; 16 mph) on the surface and 10.5 kn (19.4 km/h; 12.1 mph) underwater. On the surface, the O-class had a range of 5,500 nautical miles (10,200 km; 6,300 mi) at 11.5 kn (21.3 km/h; 13.2 mph).

The boats were armed with four 18-inch (450 mm) torpedo tubes in the bow. They carried four reloads, for a total of eight torpedoes. The O-class submarines were also armed with a single 3 in (76 mm)/23 caliber retractable deck gun.

== Construction ==
O-10's keel was laid down on 27 February 1917, by the Fore River Shipbuilding Company, in Quincy, Massachusetts. She was launched on 21 February 1918, sponsored by Mrs. Alice C. Burg, and commissioned on 17 August 1918.

== Service history ==
O-10 served during World War I operating out of the Philadelphia Navy Yard, on coastal patrol against German U-boats, until 2 November 1918, when she departed Newport, Rhode Island, with other submarines, for service in European waters. However, the Armistice with Germany was signed before the ships reached the Azores, and the ships returned to the United States.

In 1919, O-10 joined others of her class at New London, Connecticut, to train submarine crews at the Submarine School there.

When the US Navy adopted its hull classification system on 17 July 1920, she received the hull number SS-71.

In 1924, O-10 steamed to Coco Solo, in the Panama Canal Zone, where she was reclassified as a second-line submarine on 25 July 1924. Returning to operations at New London, she reverted to first-line duties on 6 June 1928. She continued at New London, until January 1930, when she sailed north to Portsmouth, New Hampshire, returning to New London, in February. She continued training duties until February 1931, when she sailed to Philadelphia, and decommissioned there on 25 June.

With the approach World War II, there was a recognized need for numerous training submarines. O-10 recommissioned at Philadelphia, on 10 March 1941, and went to New London, in May. She departed on a trial run to Portsmouth, on 19 June 1941, the day before O-9 failed to return. O-10 joined in the search for her sister boat, but found no trace of her. At 16:55 on 22 June, Triton, with Secretary of the Navy, Frank Knox, on board, fired a 21-gun salute for the crew lost on the ill-fated vessel. Returning to New London, O-10 trained crews there until war's end.

== Fate ==
On 10 September 1945, she then sailed to Portsmouth, and decommissioned there. Struck from the Naval Vessel Register on 11 October 1945, she was sold to the John J. Duane Company, of Quincy, on 21 August 1946.

== Bibliography ==
- "Table 21 - Ships on Navy List June 30, 1919". Congressional Serial Set. U.S. Government Printing Office: 769. 1921.
- Priolo, Gary. "O-10 (SS-71)". Navsource.net.
- Friedman, Norman (1995). U.S. Submarines Through 1945: An Illustrated Design History. Annapolis, Maryland: Naval Institute Press. ISBN 1-55750-263-3.
- Gardiner, Robert & Gray, Randal (1985). Conway's All the World's Fighting Ships 1906–1921. Annapolis, Maryland: Naval Institute Press. ISBN 0-85177-245-5.
- "O-10". Dictionary of American Naval Fighting Ships. Navy Department, Naval History and Heritage Command. 17 August 2015. This article incorporates text from this source, which is in the public domain.
- Hall, Anne Martin (1925). Ships of the United States navy and their sponsors, 1913-1923.
