= USS O-8 =

O-class submarine of the United States

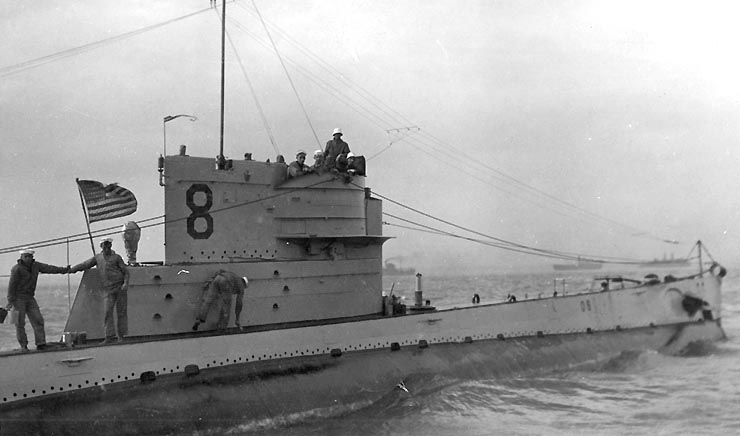
- USS O-8 with the "Victory Fleet" off New York City, in 1919

History

United States
- Name: O-8
- Ordered: 3 March 1916
- Builder: Fore River Shipbuilding Company, Quincy, Massachusetts
- Cost: $522,187.97 (hull and machinery)
- Laid down: 27 February 1917
- Launched: 31 December 1917
- Sponsored by: Mrs. Alice Burg
- Commissioned: 11 July 1918
- Decommissioned: 27 May 1931
- Recommissioned: 28 April 1941
- Decommissioned: 11 September 1945
- Stricken: 11 October 1945
- Identification: Hull symbol: SS-69 (17 July 1920); Call sign: NAMD
- Fate: Sold for scrap, 4 September 1946

General characteristics
- Class & type: O-1-class submarine
- Displacement: 520 long tons (528 t) surfaced; 629 long tons (639 t) submerged
- Length: 172 ft 4 in (52.53 m)
- Beam: 18 ft (5.5 m)
- Draft: 14 ft 5 in (4.39 m)
- Installed power: 880 bhp (656 kW) diesel; 740 hp (552 kW) electric
- Propulsion: 2 × NELSECO 6-EB-14 diesel engines; 2 × Electro-Dynamic Company electric motors; 2 × 60-cell batteries; 2 × Propellers
- Speed: 14 knots (26 km/h; 16 mph) surfaced; 10.5 knots (19.4 km/h; 12.1 mph) submerged
- Range: 5,500 nmi (10,200 km) at 11.5 kn (21.3 km/h; 13.2 mph) surfaced; 250 nmi (460 km) at 5 kn (9.3 km/h; 5.8 mph) submerged
- Test depth: 200 ft (61 m)
- Capacity: 21,897 US gal (82,890 L; 18,233 imp gal) fuel
- Complement: 2 officers; 27 enlisted
- Armament: 4 × 18 inch (450 mm) bow torpedo tubes (8 torpedoes); 1 × 3 in (76 mm)/23 caliber retractable deck gun

USS O-8 (SS-69), also known as "Submarine No. 69", was one of 16 O-class submarines of the United States Navy commissioned during World War I. She was recommissioned prior to the United States entry into WWII, for use as a trainer.

== Design ==
The O-1-class submarines were designed to meet a Navy requirement for coastal defense boats. The submarines had a length of 172 ft 4 in (52.5 m) overall, a beam of 18 ft 1 in (5.5 m), and a mean draft of 14 ft 5 in (4.4 m). They displaced 520 long tons (530 t) on the surface and 629 long tons (639 t) submerged. The O-class submarines had a crew of 2 officers and 27 enlisted men. They had a diving depth of 200 ft (61.0 m).

For surface running, the boats were powered by two 440-brake-horsepower (328 kW) NELSECO 6-EB-14 diesel engines, each driving one propeller shaft. When submerged each propeller was driven by a 370-horsepower (276 kW) Electro-Dynamic Company electric motor. They could reach 14 knots (26 km/h; 16 mph) on the surface and 10.5 kn (19.4 km/h; 12.1 mph) underwater. On the surface, the O-class had a range of 5,500 nautical miles (10,200 km; 6,300 mi) at 11.5 kn (21.3 km/h; 13.2 mph).

The boats were armed with four 18-inch (450 mm) torpedo tubes in the bow. They carried four reloads, for a total of eight torpedoes. The O-class submarines were also armed with a single 3 in (76 mm)/23 caliber retractable deck gun.

== Construction ==
O-8's keel was laid down on 27 February 1917, by the Fore River Shipbuilding Company, in Quincy, Massachusetts. She was launched on 31 December 1917, sponsored by Mrs. Alice C. Burg, and commissioned on 11 July 1918.

== Service history ==
During the final stages of World War I, O-8 operated out of the Philadelphia Navy Yard, on coastal patrol duty from Cape Cod, in Massachusetts, to Key West, in Florida. She departed Newport, Rhode Island, on 2 November 1918, with a 20-sub contingent bound for European waters; the duty was cancelled, however, as the Armistice with Germany was signed before the vessels reached the Azores.

The end of the "war to end all wars" did not terminate O-8's career; she now operated in a training capacity at the Submarine School, New London, Connecticut.

When the US Navy adopted its hull classification system on 17 July 1920, she received the hull number SS-69.

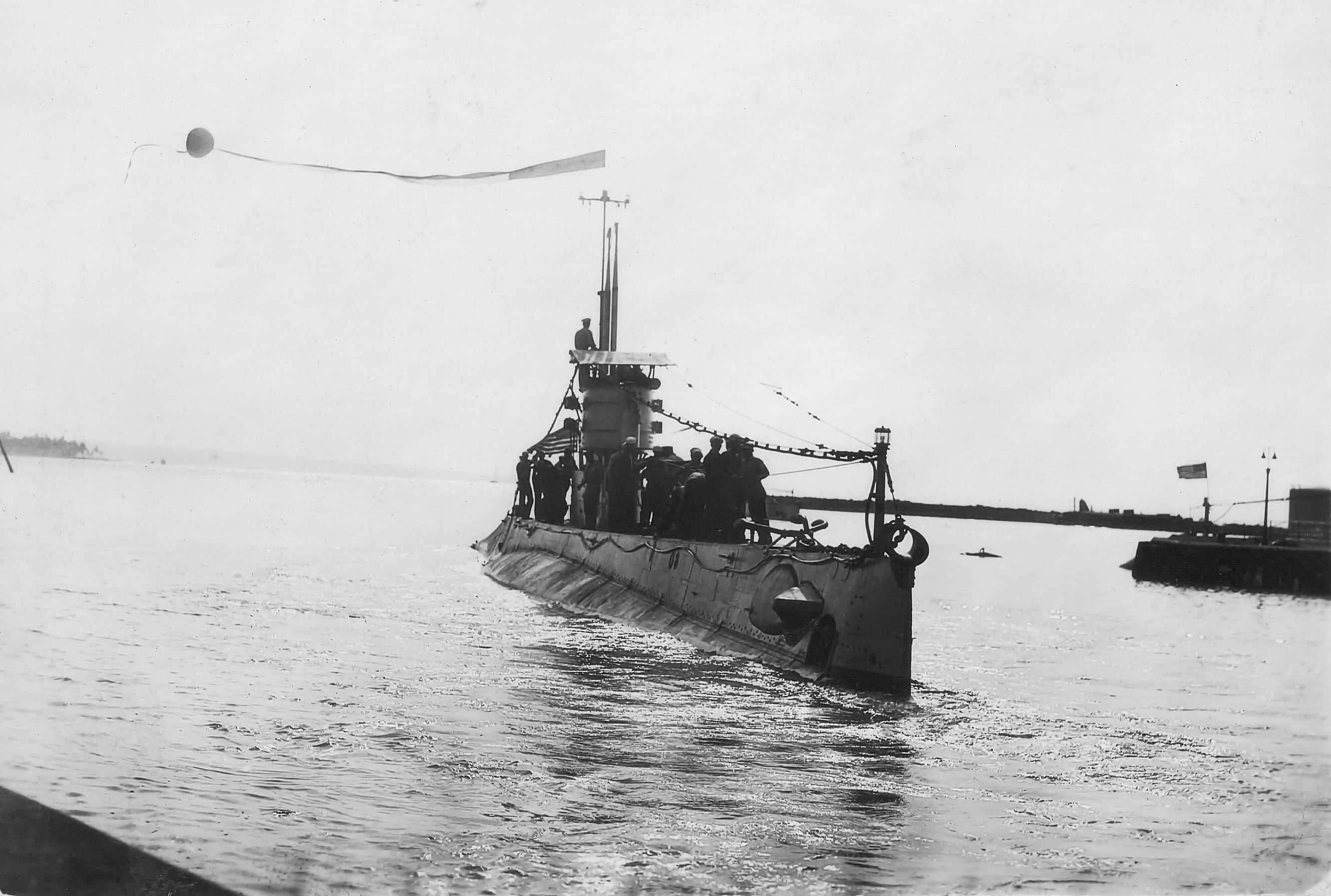
USS O-8 arriving in port, c. 1927

In 1924, she sailed for duty in Panama, where she was classified as a second-line submarine on 25 July 1924. Reverting to a first-liner on 6 June 1928, she sailed from New London, in February 1931, to Philadelphia, and decommissioned there 27 May 1931.

The imminence of World War II sparked the recall to service. O-8 recommissioned at Philadelphia, on 28 April 1941, with Lieutenant John S. McCain, Jr. taking command. In June, she returned to Submarine School, New London, to train students there until war's end.

== Fate ==
Departing New London, on 25 August 1945, the ship steamed to Portsmouth, New Hampshire, and decommissioned there on 11 September 1945; she was struck from the Naval Vessel Register on 11 October 1945, and was sold to the John J. Duane Company, of Quincy, on 4 September 1946.Famous American Admirals

== Bibliography ==
- "Table 21 - Ships on Navy List June 30, 1919". Congressional Serial Set. U.S. Government Printing Office: 768. 1921.
- Priolo, Gary. "O-8 (SS-69)". Navsource.net.
- Friedman, Norman (1995). U.S. Submarines Through 1945: An Illustrated Design History. Annapolis, Maryland: Naval Institute Press. ISBN 1-55750-263-3.
- Gardiner, Robert & Gray, Randal (1985). Conway's All the World's Fighting Ships 1906–1921. Annapolis, Maryland: Naval Institute Press. ISBN 0-85177-245-5.
- "O-8". Dictionary of American Naval Fighting Ships. Navy Department, Naval History and Heritage Command. 17 August 2015.
- Hall, Anne Martin (1925). Ships of the United States navy and their sponsors, 1913-1923.
- Reynolds, Clark G. (1978). Famous American Admirals. Van Nostrand Reinhold. ISBN 9780442260682.
