= USS Mary Alice =

Patrol vessel of the United States Navy

Coordinates: 41.1112°N 73.2216°W

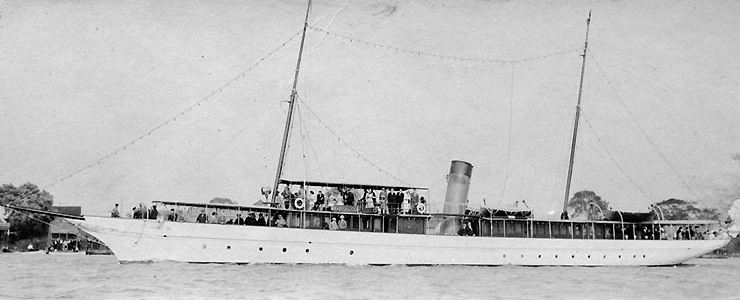
- Mary Alice as a private yacht, sometime between 1910 and 1917.

History

United States
- Name: USS Mary Alice
- Namesake: Previous name retained
- Completed: 1897
- Acquired: 10 August 1917
- Commissioned: 10 August 1917
- Fate: Sunk in collision 5 October 1918
- Notes: Operated as private yacht Bernice 1897–1907, Oneta 1907–1910, and Mary Alice 1910–1917

General characteristics
- Type: Patrol vessel
- Tonnage: 180 gross register tons
- Length: 174 ft (53 m)
- Beam: 18 ft 9 in (5.72 m)
- Draft: 9 ft 9 in (2.97 m)
- Propulsion: Steam engine, one shaft
- Speed: 20 knots
- Complement: 51
- Armament: 2 × 3-pounder guns; 2 × machine guns

USS Mary Alice (SP-397) was a United States Navy patrol vessel commissioned in 1917 and sunk in 1918.

Mary Alice was built as the fast, private steam yacht Bernice in 1897 in Brooklyn, New York. She was renamed Oneta in 1907 and Mary Alice in 1910.

On 10 August 1917, the U.S. Navy purchased Mary Alice from William J. Conners of Buffalo, New York, for use as a section patrol vessel during World War I. She was commissioned as USS Mary Alice (SP-397) the same day.

As a unit of the Naval Coast Defense Reserve, Mary Alice was assigned to the 3rd Naval District. She patrolled Long Island Sound and the approaches to New York Harbor.

In early October 1918, Mary Alice, with Captain William A. Gill, President of the U.S. Navy's Board of Inspection and Survey, embarked, served as an escort for the new submarine USS O-13 (Submarine No. 74) in Long Island Sound during O-13's pre-commissioning acceptance trials. On 5 October 1918 while conducting a submerged circular run off Bridgeport, Connecticut, O-13 suddenly rammed Mary Alice amidships and holed her. Mary Alice sank within a few minutes 1,800 yards (1,646 meters) south of Penfield Reef Light with no loss of life, and O‑13 quickly rescued her entire crew from the water.
