= USS O-1 =

O-class submarine of the United States

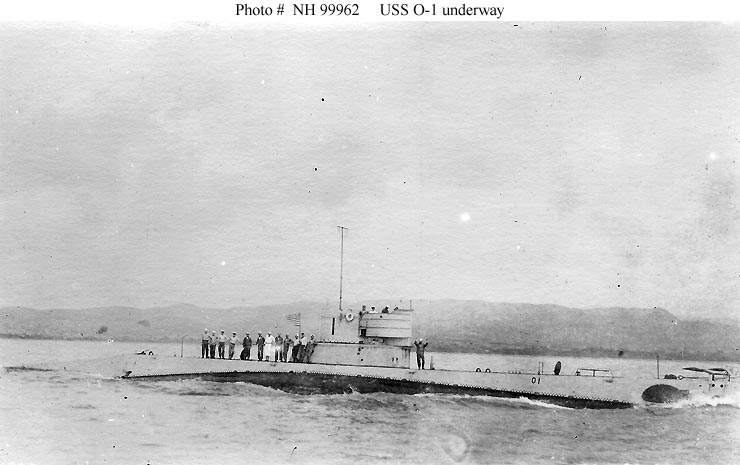
- USS O-1 underway, probably in 1918

History

United States
- Name: O-1
- Ordered: 3 March 1916
- Builder: Portsmouth Navy Yard, Kittery, Maine
- Cost: $779,722.32 (hull and machinery)
- Laid down: 26 March 1917
- Launched: 9 July 1918
- Sponsored by: Mrs. Cora Isabel Adams
- Commissioned: 5 November 1918
- Decommissioned: 11 June 1931
- Stricken: 18 May 1938
- Identification: Hull symbol: SS-62 (17 July 1920); Call sign: NEXJ
- Fate: Sold for scrap

General characteristics
- Class & type: O-1-class submarine
- Displacement: 520 long tons (528 t) surfaced; 629 long tons (639 t) submerged
- Length: 172 ft 4 in (52.53 m)
- Beam: 18 ft (5.5 m)
- Draft: 14 ft 5 in (4.39 m)
- Installed power: 880 bhp (656 kW) diesel; 740 hp (552 kW) electric
- Propulsion: 2 × NELSECO 6-EB-14 diesel engines; 2 × New York Navy Yard electric motors; 2 × 60-cell batteries; 2 × Propellers
- Speed: 14 knots (26 km/h; 16 mph) surfaced; 10.5 knots (19.4 km/h; 12.1 mph) submerged
- Range: 5,500 nmi (10,200 km) at 11.5 kn (21.3 km/h; 13.2 mph) surfaced; 250 nmi (460 km) at 5 kn (9.3 km/h; 5.8 mph) submerged
- Test depth: 200 ft (61 m)
- Capacity: 21,897 US gal (82,890 L; 18,233 imp gal) fuel
- Complement: 2 officers; 27 enlisted
- Armament: 4 × 18 inch (450 mm) bow torpedo tubes (8 torpedoes); 1 × 3 in (76 mm)/23 caliber retractable deck gun

USS O-1 (SS-62), also known as "Submarine No. 62", was the lead ship of her class of submarines of the United States Navy commissioned during World War I.

== Design ==
The O-1-class submarines were designed to meet a Navy requirement for coastal defense boats. The submarines had a length of 172 ft 4 in (52.5 m) overall, a beam of 18 ft 1 in (5.5 m), and a mean draft of 14 ft 5 in (4.4 m). They displaced 520 long tons (530 t) on the surface and 629 long tons (639 t) submerged. The O-class submarines had a crew of 2 officers and 27 enlisted men. They had a diving depth of 200 ft (61.0 m).

For surface running, the boats were powered by two 440-brake-horsepower (328 kW) NELSECO 6-EB-14 diesel engines, each driving one propeller shaft. When submerged each propeller was driven by a 370-horsepower (276 kW) New York Navy Yard electric motor. They could reach 14 knots (26 km/h; 16 mph) on the surface and 10.5 kn (19.4 km/h; 12.1 mph) underwater. On the surface, the O-class had a range of 5,500 nautical miles (10,200 km; 6,300 mi) at 11.5 kn (21.3 km/h; 13.2 mph).

The boats were armed with four 18-inch (450 mm) torpedo tubes in the bow. They carried four reloads, for a total of eight torpedoes. The O-class submarines were also armed with a single 3 in (76 mm)/23 caliber retractable deck gun.

== Construction ==
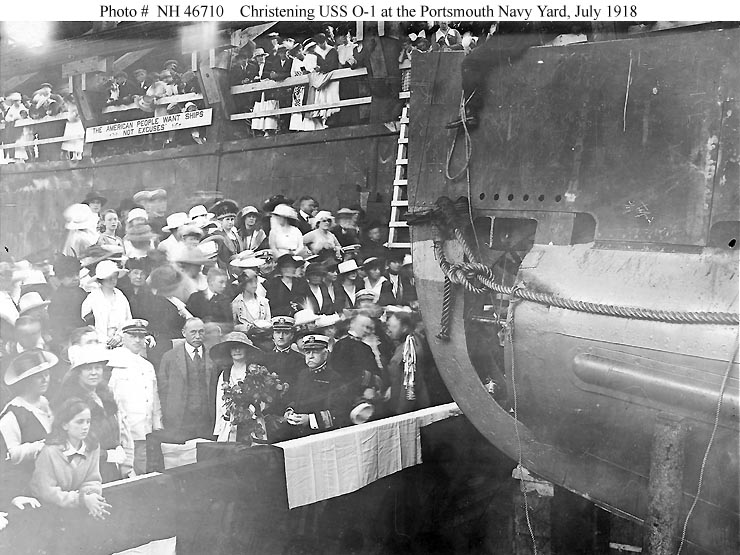
The christening of O-1, 9 July 1918

O-1's keel was laid down on 26 March 1917, at the Portsmouth Navy Yard, in Kittery, Maine. She was launched on 9 July 1918, sponsored by Mrs. Cora Isabel Adams, and commissioned on 5 November 1918.

== Service history ==
Commissioned just before the Armistice with Germany, O-1 operated in the East Coast waters from Cape Cod, in Massachusetts, to Key West, in Florida, after World War I.

When the US Navy adopted its hull classification system on 17 July 1920, she received the hull number SS-62.

Reclassified a second-line submarine, on 25 July 1924, and first-line, on 6 June 1928, O-1 was converted to an experimental vessel on 28 December 1930, and operated in this capacity out of the submarine base at New London, Connecticut, until decommissioning on 11 June 1931.

== Fate ==
She was stricken from the Naval Vessel Register on 18 May 1938, and sold for scrap.

== Bibliography ==
- "Table 21 - Ships on Navy List June 30, 1919". Congressional Serial Set. U.S. Government Printing Office: 768. 1921.
- Gary, Priolo. "O-1 (SS-62)". Navsource.net.
- Friedman, Norman (1995). U.S. Submarines Through 1945: An Illustrated Design History. Annapolis, Maryland: Naval Institute Press. ISBN 1-55750-263-3.
- Gardiner, Robert & Gray, Randal (1985). Conway's All the World's Fighting Ships 1906–1921. Annapolis, Maryland: Naval Institute Press. ISBN 0-85177-245-5.
- "O-1". Dictionary of American Naval Fighting Ships. Navy Department, Naval History and Heritage Command. This article incorporates text from this source, which is in the public domain.
- Hall, Anne Martin (1925). Ships of the United States navy and their sponsors, 1913-1923.
