= Coco Solo =

United States Navy submarine base

Coordinates: 9.37262°N 79.8812°W

Naval Base Coco Solo
- Cristóbal Este, Panama
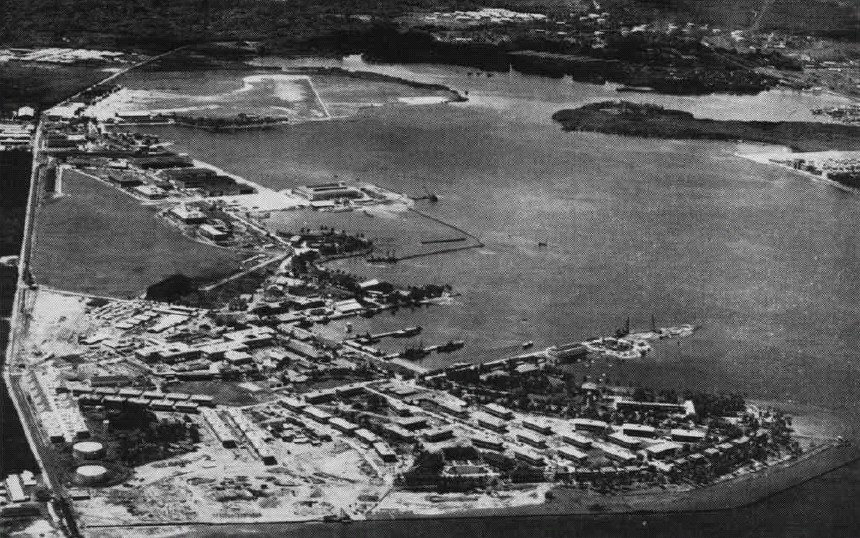
- Aerial view of the U.S. Naval Station Coco Solo in 1941

Site information
- Type: Naval base
- Controlled by: United States Navy

Site history
- In use: 1918–1999

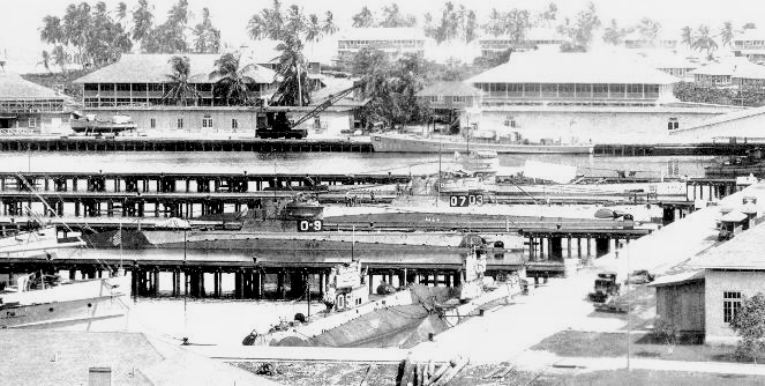
O-class submarines at Coco Solo in 1923.

Coco Solo was a United States Navy submarine base and naval air station near the Panama Canal, active from 1918 to the 1960s. The site corresponds with modern-day Cativá in Panama, on the Atlantic Ocean side of the Panama Canal Zone, near Colón, Panama.

== History ==
The submarine base at Coco Solo was established May 6, 1918. The site corresponds with modern-day Cativá in Panama. It was on the Atlantic Ocean (northwest) side of the Panama Canal Zone, near Colón, Panama. Five C-class submarines were based there during 1914–1919.

United States Senator John McCain was born in 1936 at a small Navy hospital, at Coco Solo Naval Air Station.

The larger Coco Solo Hospital was constructed in the summer of 1941. The area containing it was transferred from the civil part of the Panama Canal Zone to the naval part when Franklin Roosevelt signed Executive Order 8981 on December 17, 1941.

On December 7, 1941, three V-class submarines (Barracuda, Bass and Bonita) were stationed at Coco Solo. During World War II, Coco Solo also served as a Naval Air Facility, housing a squadron of United States Army Air Forces P-38 Lightning aircraft.

On October 31, 1955, a PBM-5 Mariner (registration 59232) crashed on takeoff from Coco Solo, resulting in the deaths of eight personnel. Contemporary news reports indicated a ninth person on the aircraft survived.

By the 1960s, no U.S. Navy vessels remained, only some support staff and housing. At the far end of Randolph Road was Fort Randolph, unused except for military training exercises, and where the Fort Randolph Riding Club was located as used by the Canal Zone Horsemen's Association.

Until the mid-1990s, the town site of Coco Solo was used by the civilian employees of the Panama Canal as a residential area. The nearby Galeta Island U.S. Navy communications facility continued in operation as well. After the turnover of the Panama Canal to Panamanians in 1999, US military activity ceased at both Coco Solo and Galeta Island.

Coco Solo is now the site of two container terminals: Colón Container Terminal and Manzanillo International Terminal, which is the busiest container port in Latin America.

== Climate ==
Climate data for Coco Solo, 4 m asl (1961–1990 normals)
Month	Jan	Feb	Mar	Apr	May	Jun	Jul	Aug	Sep	Oct	Nov	Dec	Year
Record high °C (°F)	31.7 (89.1)	30.6 (87.1)	33.3 (91.9)	36.1 (97.0)	35.0 (95.0)	33.9 (93.0)	34.4 (93.9)	33.9 (93.0)	34.4 (93.9)	34.4 (93.9)	33.3 (91.9)	31.7 (89.1)	36.1 (97.0)
Mean daily maximum °C (°F)	29.3 (84.7)	29.8 (85.6)	30.6 (87.1)	31.2 (88.2)	31.1 (88.0)	30.6 (87.1)	31.3 (88.3)	30.8 (87.4)	30.4 (86.7)	30.4 (86.7)	29.3 (84.7)	29.1 (84.4)	30.3 (86.6)
Daily mean °C (°F)	27.0 (80.6)	27.5 (81.5)	27.9 (82.2)	28.2 (82.8)	27.9 (82.2)	27.8 (82.0)	27.8 (82.0)	27.5 (81.5)	27.3 (81.1)	27.4 (81.3)	26.7 (80.1)	27.1 (80.8)	27.5 (81.5)
Mean daily minimum °C (°F)	24.6 (76.3)	25.1 (77.2)	25.2 (77.4)	25.2 (77.4)	24.7 (76.5)	24.9 (76.8)	24.3 (75.7)	24.1 (75.4)	24.3 (75.7)	24.3 (75.7)	24.1 (75.4)	25.0 (77.0)	24.7 (76.4)
Record low °C (°F)	18.9 (66.0)	20.6 (69.1)	18.9 (66.0)	19.4 (66.9)	20.6 (69.1)	21.7 (71.1)	20.6 (69.1)	21.1 (70.0)	21.7 (71.1)	21.7 (71.1)	21.1 (70.0)	19.4 (66.9)	18.9 (66.0)
Average precipitation mm (inches)	139.6 (5.50)	35.8 (1.41)	87.0 (3.43)	149.2 (5.87)	382.2 (15.05)	318.2 (12.53)	404.7 (15.93)	478.4 (18.83)	332.5 (13.09)	397.7 (15.66)	714.6 (28.13)	395.2 (15.56)	3,835.1 (150.99)
Average precipitation days (≥ 1 mm)	12.33	6.73	10.55	6.55	19.00	17.25	16.00	23.50	18.00	18.57	25.00	17.00	190.48
Source 1: Météo climat stats
Source 2: Météo Climat

== See also ==
- List of former United States military installations in Panama
- Naval Base Panama Canal Zone
