= 3-inch/23-caliber gun =

US Navy anti-aircraft gun

3"/23 caliber gun
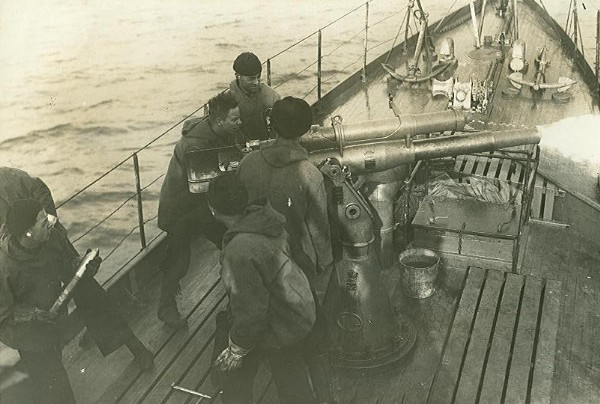
- A 3"/23-caliber gun being fired aboard the United States Navy submarine chaser USS SC-291 sometime between 1918 and 1920.
- Type: Naval gun; Anti-aircraft gun
- Place of origin: United States

Service history
- In service: 1913—1946
- Used by: US Navy
- Wars: World War I World War II

Production history
- Manufacturer: Bethlehem Steel (Mark 11); Driggs-Schroeder (Mark 13); Poole Engineering and Machine Company (Mark 14)
- Variants: Mark 9, 13, and 14

Specifications
- Mass: Mark 9: 749 pounds (340 kg) (with breech); Mark 13: 531 pounds (241 kg); Mark 14 Mod 0: 593 pounds (269 kg) (with breech); Mark 14 Mod 1: 658 pounds (298 kg) (with breech)
- Length: Mark 9: 77.05 inches (1.957 m); Mark 14: 79 inches (2.0 m)
- Barrel length: Mark 9: 69 inches (1.8 m) bore (23 calibres); Mark 14: 71 inches (1.8 m) bore (23.5 calibres)
- Shell: 16.5 lb (7.5 kg) 76.2x234 mm R
- Caliber: 3-inch (76 mm)
- Elevation: -15° to +65° or +75°
- Traverse: 365°
- Rate of fire: 8 – 9 rounds per minute
- Muzzle velocity: 1,650 feet per second (500 m/s)
- Effective firing range: 8,800 yards (8,000 m) at 45.3° elevation (WW I); 10,100 yards (9,200 m) at 45° elevation (WW II); 18,000 feet (5,500 m) at 75° elevation (AA)

The 3-inch/23-caliber gun (spoken "three-inch-twenty-three-caliber") was the standard anti-aircraft gun for United States destroyers through World War I and the 1920s. United States naval gun terminology indicates the gun fired a projectile 3 inches (76 mm) in diameter, and the barrel was 23 calibers long (barrel length is 3" × 23 = 69" or 1.75 meters.)

== Description ==
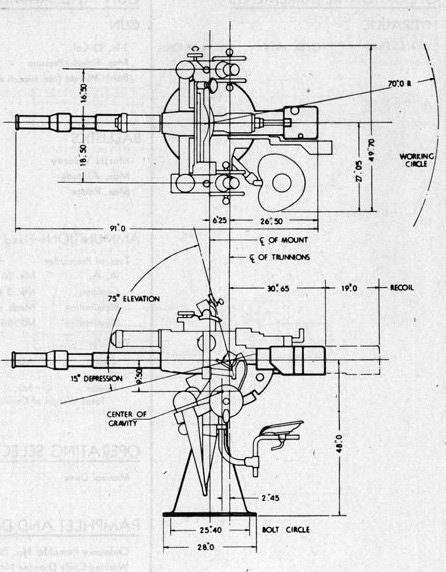
Plan and left elevation diagrams

The built-up gun with horizontal sliding breech block weighed about 531 pounds (241 kg) and used fixed ammunition (case and projectile handled as a single assembled unit) with a 13-pound (6 kg) projectile at a velocity of 1650 feet per second (500 m/s). Range was 10,100 yards (9235 meters) at 45 degrees elevation. Ceiling was 18,000 feet (5500 meters) at the maximum elevation of 75 degrees.

== History ==
The 3"/23-caliber cannon was the first purposely designed anti-aircraft cannon to reach operational service in the US military, and was a further development of a 1-pounder cannon concept designed by Admiral Twining to meet the possible threat from airships being built by various navies. It entered service in late 1913 on the Aylwin-class destroyers.

A partially retractable version was mounted as a deck gun on the US L-class, M-1 (SS-47), AA-1 class, and O-class submarines.

When World War II began, the 3"/23-caliber gun was outdated, and surviving United States destroyers built during the World War I era that were armed with the 3"/23-caliber were rearmed with dual-purpose 3"/50-caliber guns. Where there was no air threat during World War II, the 3"/23-caliber gun was employed in the surface-to-surface role for use against submarines, and was mounted on submarine chasers, armed yachts, and various auxiliaries. Some major warships carried 3"/23-caliber guns temporarily while awaiting installation of quad 1.1"/75-caliber guns.

The 3"/23-caliber gun was mounted on:

- AA-1-class submarines
- Active-class patrol boats
- Aylwin-class destroyers
- Caldwell-class destroyers
- Colorado-class battleships
- Clemson-class destroyers
- Dubuque-class gunboats
- Florida-class battleships
- Klondike-class destroyer tenders
- L-class submarines
- USS M-1 (SS-47)
- O-class submarines
- PGM-1-class motor gunboat
- SC-1-class submarine chasers
- SC-497-class submarine chasers
- Wickes-class destroyers
