= List of ships built at the Fore River Shipyard =

Below is an incomplete list of ships built at the Fore River Shipyard:

== Production record ==
=== East Braintree Yard ===
| Name(s) | Yard no. | Type (as built) | Owner | Laid down | Launched | Delivered/ Commissioned | Fate/ Decommissioned | Image | Ref. |
|---|---|---|---|---|---|---|---|---|---|
| Sally | 100 | Yacht | Lyman | Unknown | Unknown | Unknown | Unknown | | |
| Caprice | 101 | Yacht | Robinson | Unknown | Unknown | Unknown | Unknown | | |
| Eleanor | 102 | Yacht | Clapp | Unknown | Unknown | Unknown | Unknown | | |
| USS Lawrence (DD-8) | 103 | Bainbridge-class destroyer | U.S. Navy | 10 April 1899 | 7 November 1900 | 7 April 1903 | 20 June 1919 | | |
| USS Macdonough (DD-9) | 104 | Bainbridge-class destroyer | U.S. Navy | 10 April 1899 | 24 December 1900 | 5 September 1903 | 3 September 1919 | | |
| Jule | 105 | Yacht | J. Arthur | Unknown | Unknown | 12 June 1899 | Unknown | | |
| United States lightship LV-72 | 106 | Lightvessel | U.S Lighthouse Board | Unknown | Unknown | 13 February 1901 | Unknown | | |

=== Quincy Point Yard ===
==== Yard number 107-206 ====
| Name | Yard no. | Type | Owner | Laid down | Launched | Delivered/ Commissioned | Fate/ Decommissioned | Image | Ref. |
|---|---|---|---|---|---|---|---|---|---|
| USS Des Moines (CL-17) | 107 | Denver-class cruiser | United States Navy | 28 August 1900 | 20 September 1902 | 5 March 1904 | 9 April 1921 | | |
| USS New Jersey (BB-16) | 108 | Virginia-class battleship | United States Navy | 2 April 1902 | 10 November 1904 | 11 May 1906 | 6 August 1920 | | |
| USS Rhode Island (BB-17) | 109 | Virginia-class battleship | United States Navy | 1 May 1902 | 17 May 1904 | 19 February 1906 | 30 June 1920 | | |
| Thomas W. Lawson | 110 | 404' 7-Masted Coal Schooner | Coastwise Transportation Co. | November 1901 | 10 December 1902 | August 1902 | 14 December 1907 | | |
| Unnamed | 111 | 317' Carfloat | NY, NH & HRR | Unknown | Unknown | 6 December 1902 | Unknown | | |
| Unnamed | 112 | 317' Carfloat | NY, NH & HRR | Unknown | Unknown | 6 December 1902 | Unknown | | |
| William L. Douglas | 113 | 353' 6-Masted Coal Schooner | Coastwise Transportation Co. | Unknown | Unknown | 11 November 1903 | Unknown | | |
| Boston | 114 | 317' Freighter | New England Navigation Co. | Unknown | Unknown | 16 July 1904 | 1934 | | |
| Providence | 115 | 396' Coastal Passenger Steamer | New England Navigation Co. | Unknown | Unknown | 21 March 1905 | 1938 | | |
| Unnamed | 116 | 317' Carfloat | NY, NH & HRR | Unknown | Unknown | 17 November 1903 | Unknown | | |
| Unnamed | 117 | 317' Carfloat | NY, NH & HRR | Unknown | Unknown | 16 July 1904 | Unknown | | |
| Unnamed | 118 | 317' Carfloat | NY, NH & HRR | Unknown | Unknown | 10 February 1904 | Unknown | | |
| Unnamed | 119 | 317' Carfloat | NY, NH & HRR | Unknown | Unknown | 10 February 1904 | Unknown | | |
| USS Vermont (BB-20) | 120 | Connecticut-class battleship | United States Navy | 21 May 1904 | 31 August 1905 | 4 March 1907 | 30 June 1920 | | |
| No. 3 | 121 | 167' Tank Barge | Standard Oil | Unknown | Unknown | 23 November 1904 | Unknown | | |
| No. 4 | 122 | 167' Tank Barge | Standard Oil | Unknown | Unknown | 16 December 1904 | Unknown | | |
| No. 1 | 123 | Type 1 submarine | Imperial Japanese Navy | Unknown | Unknown | 5 October 1904 | Unknown | | |
| No. 2 | 124 | Type 1 submarine | Imperial Japanese Navy | Unknown | Unknown | 5 October 1904 | Unknown | | |
| No. 3 | 125 | Type 1 submarine | Imperial Japanese Navy | Unknown | Unknown | 5 October 1904 | Unknown | | |
| No. 4 | 126 | Type 1 submarine | Imperial Japanese Navy | Unknown | Unknown | 5 October 1904 | Unknown | | |
| No. 5 | 127 | Type 1 submarine | Imperial Japanese Navy | Unknown | Unknown | 5 October 1904 | Unknown | | |
| USS Octopus (SS-9) | 128 | C-class submarine | United States Navy | Unknown | 4 October 1906 | 30 June 1908 | 4 August 1919 | | |
| USS Viper (SS-10) | 129 | B-class submarine | United States Navy | Unknown | 30 March 1907 | 18 October 1907 | 1 December 1921 | | |
| USS Cuttlefish (SS-11) | 130 | B-class submarine | United States Navy | Unknown | 1 September 1906 | 18 October 1907 | 12 December 1919 | | |
| USS Tarantula (SS-12) | 131 | B-class submarine | United States Navy | Unknown | 1 September 1906 | 18 October 1907 | 12 December 1919 | | |
| USS Birmingham (CL-2) | 132 | Chester-class cruiser | United States Navy | 14 August 1905 | 29 May 1907 | 11 April 1908 | 1 December 1923 | | |
| USS Salem (CL-3) | 133 | Chester-class cruiser | United States Navy | 28 August 1905 | 27 July 1907 | 1 August 1908 | 16 August 1921 | | |
| Spray | 133 | 136' trawler | Bay State Fishing Co. | 6 December 1905 | Unknown | Unknown | Unknown | | |
| Spray | 134 | 410' passenger steamer | South Pacific Co. | 22 December 1907 | Unknown | Unknown | Scrapped in 1937 | | |
| South Shore | 135 | 207' coastal steamer | Nantasket Beach Co. | 22 December 1907 | Unknown | Unknown | Wrecked 28 April 1928 | | |
| Spray | 135 | 410' passenger steamer | South Pacific Co. | 22 December 1907 | Unknown | Unknown | Scrapped in 1937 | | |
| South Shore | 136 | 207' coastal steamer | Nantasket Beach Co. | 22 December 1907 | Unknown | Unknown | Wrecked 28 April 1928 | | |
| Satilla | 137 | 313' freighter | Brunswick Steamship Co. | Unknown | 10 November 1906 | Unknown | Sunk 7 February 1917 | | |
| Ochmulgee | 138 | 313' freighter | Brunswick Steamship Co. | Unknown | 04 Apr, 1907 | Unknown | Scrapped 1929 | | |
| Ogeechee | 139 | 313' freighter | Brunswick Steamship Co. | Unknown | 29 Dec, 1906 | Unknown | Sunk 29 July 1917 | | |
| Ossabaw | 140 | 313' freighter | Brunswick Steamship Co. | Unknown | 24 Feb, 1907 | Unknown | Scrapped 1933 | | |
| Everett | 141 | 400' collier | New England Coal & Coke | Unknown | 19 Oct, 1907 | Unknown | Scrapped 1948 | | |
| Malden | 142 | 400' collier | New England Coal & Coke | Unknown | 02 Dec, 1907 | Unknown | Collision 17 September 1921 | | |
| Melrose | 143 | 400' collier | New England Coal & Coke | Unknown | 11 Jan, 1908 | Unknown | Scrapped 1947 | | |
| Altamaha | 144 | 313' freighter | Brunswick Steamship Co. | Unknown | 30 Dec, 1907 | Unknown | Barged 1924; Abandoned 1933 | | |
| New England | 145 | 131' lighter | New England Navigation Co. | Unknown | 02 Nov, 1907 | Unknown | Unknown | | |
| Transfer No. 21 | 146 | 125' Harbor Tug | NY, NH & HRR | Unknown | 19 Jan, 1908 | Unknown | Unknown | | |
| United States lightship LV-90 | 147 | 135' Lightship (Hedge Fence Station) | U.S Lighthouse Board | Unknown | 14 May 1908 | Unknown | Discarded 1955 | | |
| United States lightship LV-91 | 148 | 135' Lightship (Relief No. 1) | U.S Lighthouse Board | Unknown | 29 May 1908 | Unknown | Discarded 1963 | | |
| United States lightship LV-92 | 149 | 135' Lightship (Relief No. 2) | U.S Lighthouse Board | Unknown | 15 Jun, 1908 | Unknown | Discarded 1954 | | |
| United States lightship LV-93 | 150 | 135' Lightship (Swiftsure Station) | U.S Lighthouse Board | Unknown | 06 Jul, 1908 | Unknown | Discarded 1955 | | |

== Significant ships ==
=== U.S. Navy warships ===
Numerous famous warships were built at the Fore River Shipyard. A partial list is below. The date in parentheses indicates the date the ship was commissioned by the U.S. Navy, and not the date of its launch.

==== Aircraft carriers ====
- 1 of 2 Lexington-class aircraft carriers
  - USS Lexington (CV-2) (1927) Battle of the Coral Sea
- USS Wasp (CV-7) (1940) Guadalcanal Campaign
- 5 of 24 Essex-class aircraft carriers
  - USS Lexington (CV-16) (1943) Battle of the Philippine Sea - Philippines campaign (1944-45)
  - USS Bunker Hill (CV-17) (1943) Battle of the Philippine Sea - Philippines campaign (1944-45) - Battle of Okinawa
  - USS Wasp (CV-18) (1943) Battle of the Philippine Sea - Philippines campaign (1944-45)
  - USS Hancock (CV-19) (1944) Philippines campaign (1944-45) - Battle of Okinawa - Vietnam War
  - USS Philippine Sea (CV-47) (1946) Korean War

==== Battleships ====
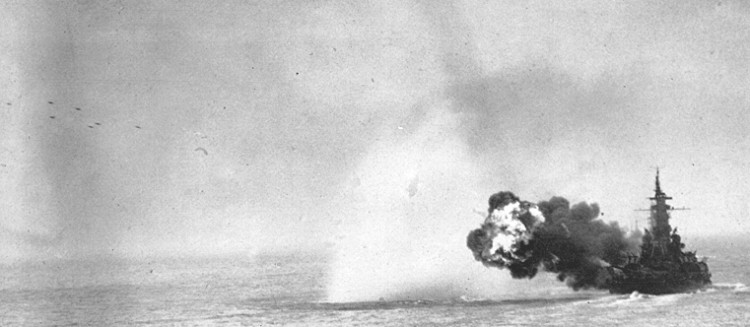
Massachusetts fires a full broadside. Outbound projectiles are in upper left of photo.

- USS New Jersey (BB-16) (1906)
- USS Rhode Island (BB-17) (1906)
- USS Vermont (BB-20) (1907)
- USS North Dakota (BB-29) (1910)
- USS Nevada (BB-36) (1916) World War I - Attack on Pearl Harbor - Invasion of Normandy and invasions of Southern France and Okinawa
- USS Massachusetts (BB-59) (1942) Naval Battle of Casablanca - Philippines campaign (1944-45) - invasion of Okinawa

==== Cruisers ====
- USS Birmingham (CL-2) (1908) World War I
- USS Salem (CL-3) (1907) World War I
- USS Raleigh (CL-7) (1924) Attack on Pearl Harbor
- USS Detroit (CL-8) (1923) Attack on Pearl Harbor
- 1 of 6 Northampton-class heavy cruisers
  - USS Northampton (CA-26) (1930) Doolittle Raid - Battle of Midway - Battle of the Santa Cruz Islands - Battle of Tassafaronga
- 1 of 2 Portland-class heavy cruisers
  - USS Portland (CA-33) (1933) Battle of the Coral Sea - Battle of Midway - Battle of the Eastern Solomons - Battle of the Santa Cruz Islands - Naval Battle of Guadalcanal - Battle of Surigao Strait - invasion of Okinawa
- 2 of 7 New Orleans-class heavy cruisers
  - USS Quincy (CA-39) (1936) Battle of Savo Island
  - USS Vincennes (CA-44) (1937) Doolittle Raid - Battle of Midway - Battle of Savo Island
- 2 of 8 Atlanta-class light cruisers
  - USS San Diego (CL-53) (1941) Naval Battle of Guadalcanal - Battle of the Philippine Sea - invasion of Okinawa
  - USS San Juan (CL-54) (1941) Guadalcanal Campaign - Battle of the Santa Cruz Islands - Battle of the Philippine Sea - Philippines campaign (1944-45) - Battle of Okinawa
- 6 of 27 Cleveland-class light cruisers
  - USS Vincennes (CL-64) (1943) Battle of the Philippine Sea - Philippines campaign (1944-45) - Battle of Okinawa
  - USS Pasadena (CL-65) (1943) Battle of Okinawa
  - USS Springfield (CL-66) (1944) Battle of Okinawa
  - USS Topeka (CL-67) (1944) Battle of Okinawa - Vietnam War
  - USS Providence (CL-82) (1944) Vietnam War
  - USS Manchester (CL-83) (1946) Korean War
- 8 of 14 Baltimore-class heavy cruisers
  - USS Baltimore (CA-68) (1942) Battle of the Philippine Sea - Philippines campaign (1944-45) - Battle of Okinawa
  - USS Boston (CA-69) (1942) Battle of the Philippine Sea - Philippines campaign (1944-45) - Vietnam War
  - USS Canberra (CA-70) (1943) Battle of the Philippine Sea - Vietnam War
  - USS Quincy (CA-71) (1943) Invasion of Normandy and invasion of Southern France

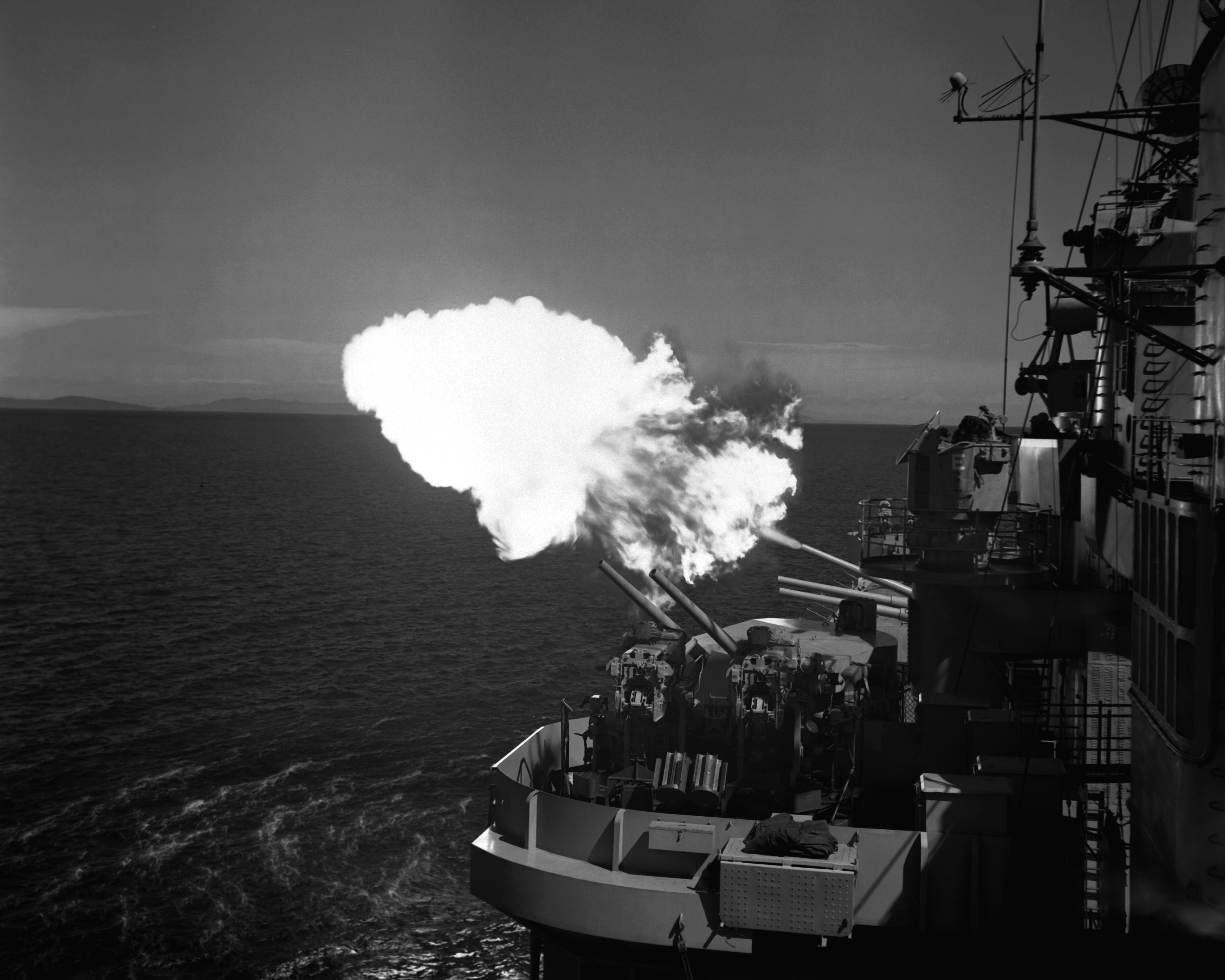
St. Paul was the last Baltimore-class cruiser providing gunfire support for ground forces.

  - USS Pittsburgh (CA-72) (1944) Battle of Okinawa
  - USS St. Paul (CA-73) (1944) World War II - Korean War - Vietnam War
  - USS Columbus (CA-74) (1944)
  - USS Helena (CA-75) (1945) Korean War
- 4 of 4 Oregon City-class heavy cruisers
  - USS Oregon City (CA-122) (1945)
  - USS Albany (CA-123) (1945)
  - USS Rochester (CA-124) (1945) Korean War
  - USS Northampton (CLC-1) (1953)
- 2 of 3 Des Moines-class heavy cruisers
  - USS Des Moines (CA-134) (1946)
  - USS Salem (CA-139) (1949)
- USS Long Beach (CGN-9) (1961) Vietnam War

==== Destroyer Leaders ====
- USS Willis A. Lee (DL-4) (1954)
- USS Wilkinson (DL-5) (1954)

==== Guided Missile Frigates/Cruisers ====
- USS Farragut (DLG-6) (1960)
- USS Luce (DLG-7) (1961)
- USS Macdonough (DLG-8) (1961)
- USS Bainbridge (DLGN-25) (1962)

==== Destroyers ====
- 4 of 21 Paulding class
  - USS Sterett (DD-27) (1909)
  - USS Perkins (DD-26) (1910)
  - USS Walke (DD-34) (1911)
  - USS Henley (DD-39) (1912)
- 1 of 4 Cassin class
  - USS Duncan (DD-46) (1913)
- 1 of 6 O'Brien class
  - USS Cushing (DD-55) (1915)
- 1 of 6 Tucker class
  - USS Tucker (DD-57) (1916)
- 2 of 6 Sampson class
  - USS Sampson (DD-63) (1916)
  - USS Rowan (DD-64) (1916)

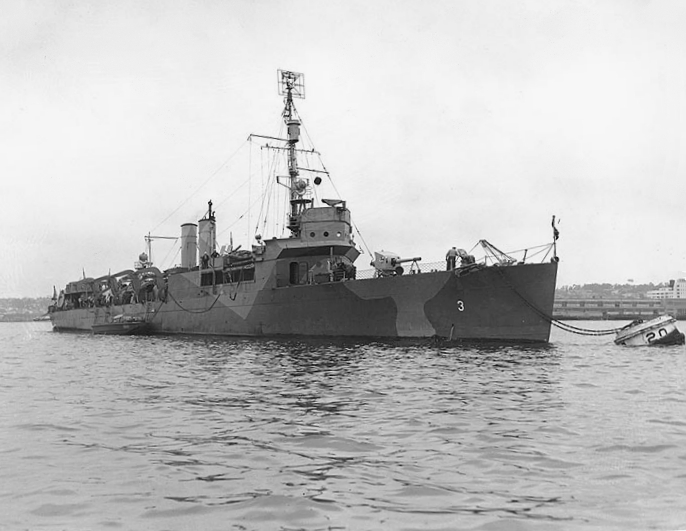
Gregory was one of the World War I veterans converted to high-speed transports for the Battle of Guadalcanal.

- 26 of 111 Wickes class
  - USS Little (DD-79) (1918) World War I - Guadalcanal campaign
  - USS Kimberly (DD-80) (1918) World War I
  - USS Sigourney (DD-81) (1918) World War I - Destroyers for Bases Agreement
  - USS Gregory (DD-82) (1918) World War I - Guadalcanal campaign
  - USS Stringham (DD-83) (1918) World War I - Guadalcanal campaign - Battle of the Philippine Sea - Battle of Okinawa
  - USS Dyer (DD-84) (1918) World War I
  - USS Colhoun (DD-85) (1918) World War I - Guadalcanal campaign
  - USS Stevens (DD-86) (1918) World War I
  - USS Bell (DD-95) (1918) World War I
  - USS Stribling (DD-96) (1918) World War I
  - USS Murray (DD-97) (1918)
  - USS Israel (DD-98) (1918)
  - USS Luce (DD-99) (1918) World War I
  - USS Maury (DD-100) (1918)
  - USS Lansdale (DD-101) (1918)

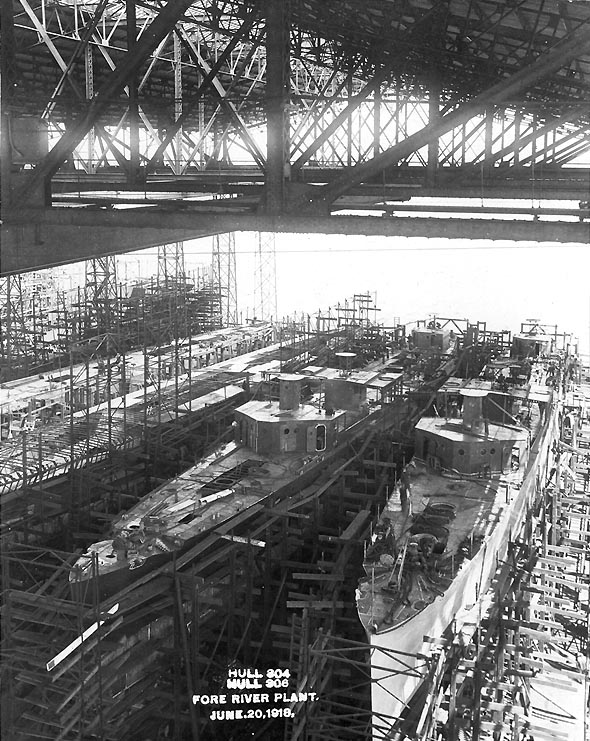
Many Fore River destroyers never saw combat with the United States Navy, but twelve served with the Royal Navy in the Destroyers for Bases Agreement twenty years later.

  - USS Mahan (DD-102) (1918)
  - USS Palmer (DD-161) (1919) invasion of North Africa - Philippines campaign (1944-45)
  - USS Thatcher (DD-162) (1919) Destroyers for Bases Agreement
  - USS Walker (DD-163) (1919)
  - USS Crosby (DD-164) (1919) Guadalcanal campaign - Philippines campaign (1944-45) - Battle of Okinawa
  - USS Meredith (DD-165) (1919)
  - USS Bush (DD-166) (1919)
  - USS Cowell (DD-167) (1919) Destroyers for Bases Agreement
  - USS Maddox (DD-168) (1919) Destroyers for Bases Agreement
  - USS Foote (DD-169) (1919) Destroyers for Bases Agreement
  - USS Kalk (DD-170) (1919) Destroyers for Bases Agreement
- 10 of 156 Clemson class
  - USS Belknap (DD-251) (1919) Philippines campaign (1944-45)
  - USS McCook (DD-252) (1919) Destroyers for Bases Agreement
  - USS McCalla (DD-253) (1919) Destroyers for Bases Agreement
  - USS Rodgers (DD-254) (1919) Destroyers for Bases Agreement
  - USS Osmond Ingram (DD-255) (1919) World War II
  - USS Bancroft (DD-256) (1919) Destroyers for Bases Agreement
  - USS Welles (DD-257) (1919) Destroyers for Bases Agreement
  - USS Aulick (DD-258) (1919) Destroyers for Bases Agreement
  - USS Turner (DD-259) (1919)
  - USS Gillis (DD-260) (1919) Battle of Okinawa
- 1 of 8 Farragut class
  - USS Farragut (DD-348) (1934) Attack on Pearl Harbor - Battle of the Coral Sea - Battle of the Eastern Solomons - Battle of the Philippine Sea
- 4 of 8 Porter class
  - USS Phelps (DD-360) (1935) Attack on Pearl Harbor - Battle of the Coral Sea - Battle of Midway
  - USS Clark (DD-361) (1935) World War II
  - USS Moffett (DD-362) (1935) World War II
  - USS Balch (DD-363) (1936) Doolittle Raid - Battle of Midway - Guadalcanal campaign
- 2 of 4 Gridley class
  - USS Gridley (DD-380) (1936) Guadalcanal campaign - Battle of the Philippine Sea - Philippines campaign (1944-45)
  - USS Craven (DD-382) (1937) Battle of Vella Gulf - Battle of the Philippine Sea
- 7 of 30 Benson class
  - USS Benson (DD-421) (1939) invasions of Sicily, Italy and Southern France
  - USS Mayo (DD-422) (1940) invasion of Italy
  - USS Bancroft (DD-598) (1941) World War II
  - USS Barton (DD-599) (1942) Battle of the Santa Cruz Islands - Naval Battle of Guadalcanal
  - USS Boyle (DD-600) (1942) invasions of North Africa, Sicily and Southern France
  - USS Champlin (DD-601) (1942) invasion of Sicily
  - USS Nields (DD-616) (1942) invasions of Sicily and Southern France
  - USS Ordronaux (DD-617) (1942) invasions of Sicily and Southern France
- 4 of 98 Gearing class
  - USS Joseph P. Kennedy, Jr. (DD-850) (1945) Korean War
  - USS Rupertus (DD-851) (1945) Korean War - Vietnam War
  - USS Leonard F. Mason (DD-852) (1946) Korean War - Vietnam War
  - USS Charles H. Roan (DD-853) (1946)
- USS Basilone (DDE-824) (1949) (only a conversion... ?)

==== Destroyer Escorts ====
- 9 of 148 Buckley-class destroyer escorts
- 3 of 22 Rudderow-class destroyer escorts
  - DeLong, Coates, Eugene E. Elmore
- 6 of 51 Crosley-class high speed transports
  - Kline, Raymon W. Herndon, Scribner, Diachenko, Horace A. Bass, Wantuck
- See also: Bethlehem Hingham Shipyard

==== Submarines ====
- The first five Imperial Japanese Navy submarines, known as the Holland Type VII submarines, built (in relative secrecy) at Fore River in 1904.
- The first Spanish submarine, Isaac Peral (A-0) (1916)

===== B class =====
- USS Viper (SS-10) (1907)
- USS Cuttlefish (SS-11) (1907)
- USS Tarantula (SS-12) (1907)

===== C class =====
- USS Octopus (SS-9) (1908)
- USS Stingray (SS-13) (1909)
- USS Tarpon (SS-14) (1909)
- USS Bonita (SS-15) (1909)
- USS Snapper (SS-16) (1910)

===== D class =====
- USS Narwhal (SS-17) (1909)
- USS Grayling (SS-18) (1909)
- USS Salmon (SS-19) (1910)

===== E class =====
- USS Skipjack (SS-24) (1912)
- USS Sturgeon (SS-25) (1912)

===== K class =====
- USS Haddock (SS-32) (1914)
- USS Cachalot (SS-33) (1914)
- USS K-5 (SS-36) (1914)
- USS K-6 (SS-37) (1914)

===== L class =====
- USS L-1 (SS-40) (1916)
- USS L-2 (SS-41) (1916)
- USS L-3 (SS-42) (1916)
- USS L-4 (SS-43) (1916)
- USS L-9 (SS-49) (1916)
- USS L-10 (SS-50) (1916)
- USS L-11 (SS-51) (1916)

===== M class =====
- USS M-1 (SS-47) (1918)

===== O class =====
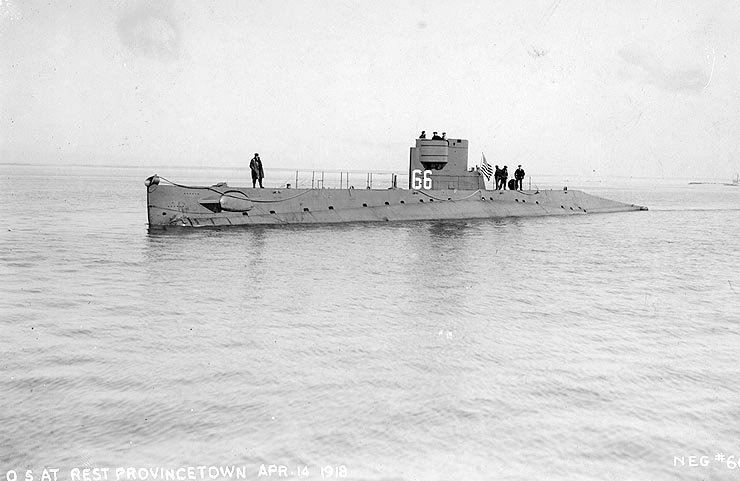
Fore River Shipyard built eight of the sixteen United States O-class submarines.

- USS O-3 (SS-64) (1917)
- USS O-4 (SS-65) (1917)
- USS O-5 (SS-66) (1917)
- USS O-6 (SS-67) (1917)
- USS O-7 (SS-68) (1917)
- USS O-8 (SS-69) (1917)
- USS O-9 (SS-70) (1918)
- USS O-10 (SS-71) (1918)

===== R class =====
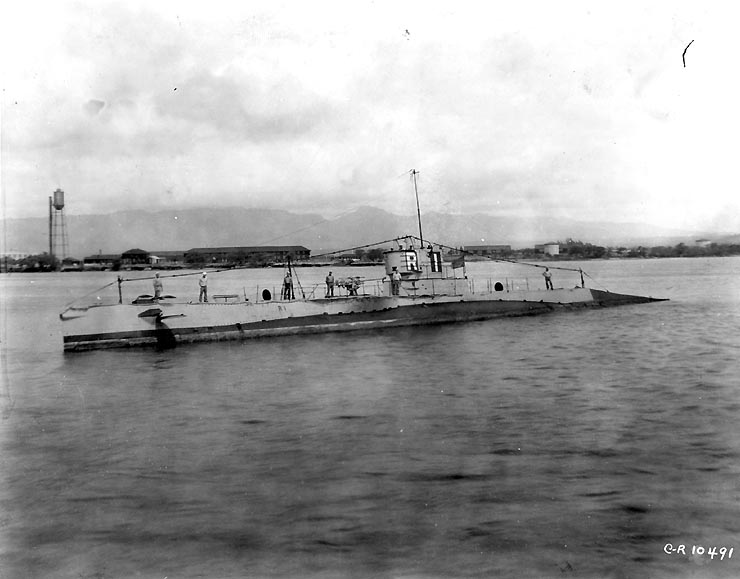
Fore River Shipyard built 14 of the 27 United States R-class submarines.

- USS R-1 (SS-78) (1918)
- USS R-2 (SS-79) (1918)
- USS R-3 (SS-80) (1918)
- USS R-4 (SS-81) (1918)
- USS R-5 (SS-82) (1918)
- USS R-6 (SS-83) (1919)
- USS R-7 (SS-84) (1919)
- USS R-8 (SS-85) (1919)
- USS R-9 (SS-86) (1919)
- USS R-10 (SS-87) (1919)
- USS R-11 (SS-88) (1919)
- USS R-12 (SS-89) (1919)
- USS R-13 (SS-90) (1919)
- USS R-14 (SS-91) (1919)

===== S class =====
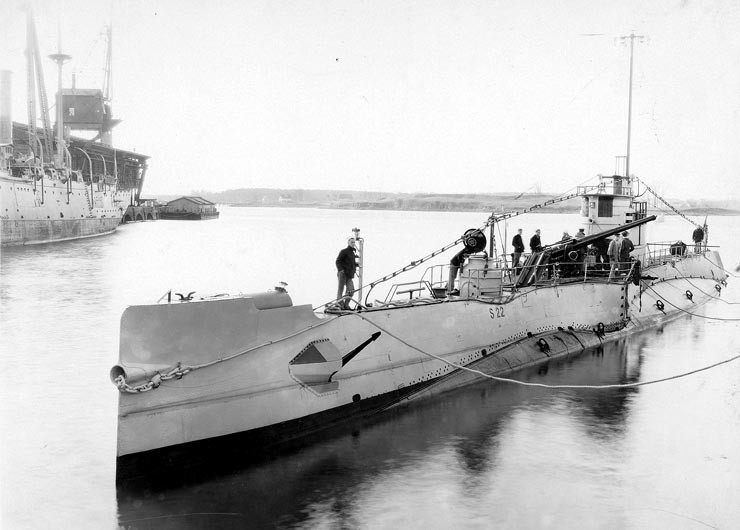
Fore River Shipyard built 19 of the 31 "Holland type" United States S-class submarines.

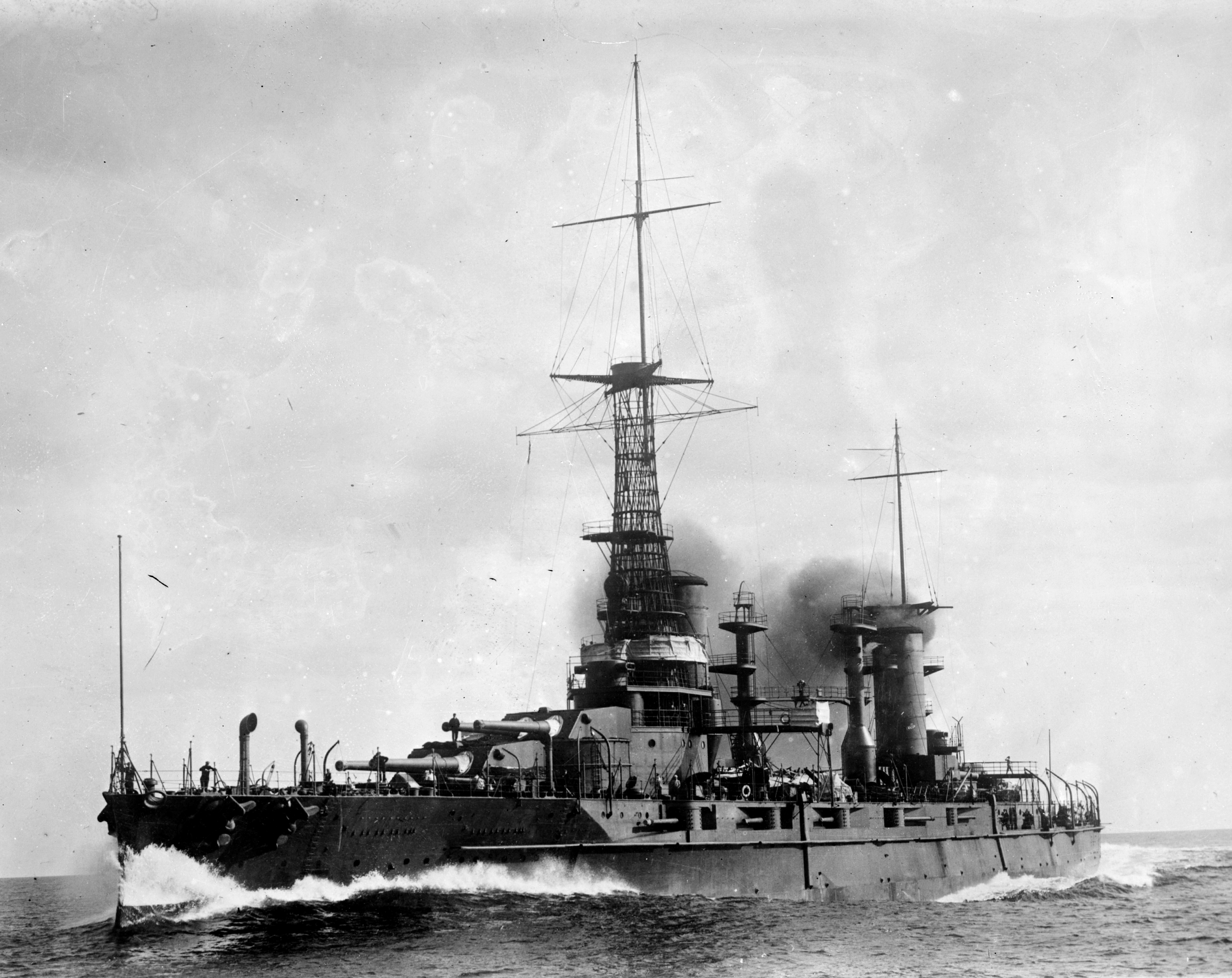
ARA Rivadavia

- USS S-1 (SS-105) (1918)
- USS S-18 (SS-123) (1918) 8 World War II Pacific patrols
- USS S-19 (SS-124) (1920)
- USS S-20 (SS-125) (1920)
- USS S-21 (SS-126) (1920)
- USS S-22 (SS-127) (1920)
- USS S-23 (SS-128) (1920) 7 World War II Pacific patrols
- USS S-24 (SS-129) (1922)
- USS S-25 (SS-130) (1922)
- USS S-26 (SS-131) (1922)
- USS S-27 (SS-132) (1922) 1 World War II Pacific patrol
- USS S-28 (SS-133) (1922) sank 1 ship in 7 World War II Pacific patrols
- USS S-29 (SS-134) (1922)
- USS S-42 (SS-153) (1923) sank 1 ship in 6 World War II Pacific patrols
- USS S-43 (SS-154) (1923) 3 World War II Pacific patrols
- USS S-44 (SS-155) (1923) sank 3 ships in 5 World War II Pacific patrols
- USS S-45 (SS-156) (1923) 4 World War II Pacific patrols
- USS S-46 (SS-157) (1923) 5 World War II Pacific patrols
- USS S-47 (SS-158) (1924) 7 World War II Pacific patrols

===== T class =====
- USS T-1 (SS-52) (1920)
- USS T-2 (SS-60) (1922)
- USS T-3 (SS-61) (1920)

===== Sturgeon class =====
- USS Whale (SSN-638) (1968)
- USS Sunfish (SSN-649) (1969)

==== Tank Landing Ships ====
LSTs 361-382 and 1004-1027 (46 total)

==== Oilers ====
- USS Neosho (AO-143) (1954)

==== Submarine tenders ====
===== L. Y. Spear class =====
- USS L. Y. Spear (AS-36) (1970) Named after Electric Boat Company executive, Lawrence York Spear. This ship was launched on 7 September 1967, commissioned in 1970 and decommissioned in 1996.
- USS Dixon (AS-37) (1971)

=== Commercial ships ===
==== Passenger ships ====
- SS Borinquen (1931) New York & Porto Rico Line, Caribbean liner
- SS Mariposa (1932) Matson Line, Hawaiian transPacific liner
- SS Monterey (1932) Matson Line, Hawaiian transPacific liner
- SS Lurline (1933) Matson Line, Hawaiian transPacific liner
- SS Independence (1951) American Export Line, transatlantic liner
- SS Constitution (1951) American Export Line, transatlantic liner
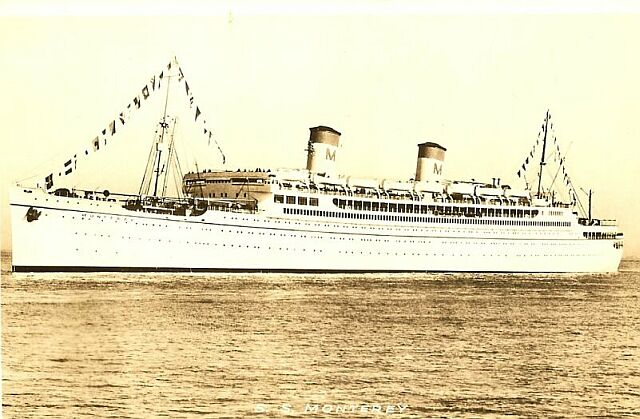
  SS Monterey

==== Other ships ====
- Thomas W. Lawson, a seven-masted, steel-hull schooner, the only ship of her kind ever built.
- sail-steam yacht Aloha (1910), later served as USS Aloha
- William L. Douglas, a six-masted, steel-hull collier
- Sankaty, a propeller-driven steamer that served as a ferry to Martha's Vineyard and Nantucket and as a Canadian minelayer during World War II.
- ARA Rivadavia, a battleship of the Rivadavia class for the Argentine Navy; one of only three foreign battleships built in US.
- SS Manhattan (1962) - Largest oil tanker in the world when built. Converted to an icebreaker and successfully navigated the Northwest Passage in 1969.
- 2nd Lieutenant John P. Bobo class of strategic sealift ships

== See also ==
- List of United States Navy ships

== Sources ==
- Blair, Clay Jr. (1975). Silent Victory, Volume 2. J. B. Lippincott Company. ISBN 978-1-55750-217-9.
- Fahey, James C. (1941). The Ships and Aircraft of the U.S. Fleet, Two-Ocean Fleet Edition. Ships and Aircraft. ISBN 978-0-87021-646-6.
- Silverstone, Paul H. (1968). U.S. Warships of World War II. Doubleday and Company. ISBN 978-0-87021-773-9.
- Tillman, Barrett (2005). Clash of the Carriers. New American Library. ISBN 978-0-451-21670-0.
