= List of submarines of the United States Navy =

Ships of the United States Navy

Ships in current service
- Current ships

Ships grouped alphabetically
- A–B; C; D–F; G–H; I–K; L; M; N–O; P; Q–R; S; T–V; W–Z

Ships grouped by type
- Aircraft carriers; Airships; Amphibious warfare ships; Auxiliaries; Battlecruisers; Battleships; Cruisers; Destroyers; Destroyer escorts; Destroyer leaders; Escort carriers; Frigates; Hospital ships; Littoral combat ships; Mine warfare vessels; Monitors; Oilers; Patrol vessels; Registered civilian vessels; Sailing frigates; Steam frigates; Steam gunboats; Ships of the line; Sloops of war; Submarines; Torpedo boats; Torpedo retrievers; Unclassified miscellaneous; Yard and district craft

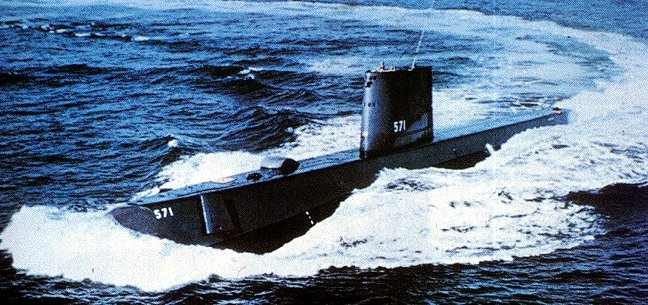
USS Nautilus (SSN-571)

This is a list of submarines of the United States Navy, listed by hull number and by name.

== List ==
List submarines of the United States Navy, by hull number and boat name
Hull number	Name	Notes
	Turtle	World's first combat submersible. Deployed in 1775. Failed mission to destroy HMS Eagle. Continental Army project.
	Alligator	Experimental submarine built in 1862. Foundered in bad weather in 1863. First submarine of the United States Navy.
	Intelligent Whale	Experimental submarine built in 1863, acquired by the US Navy in 1869 and abandoned in 1873.
DSV-0	Trieste	First submarine which reached the Challenger Deep by Swiss Jacques Piccard and US Navy Lieutenant Don Walsh in 1960.
DSV-1	Trieste II	Formerly X-1
DSV-2	Alvin	
DSV-3	Turtle	
DSV-4	Sea Cliff	
DSV-5	Nemo	
NR-1	NR-1	Nuclear powered research submarine.
SSK-1	K-1 / Barracuda	Re-designated as SST-3.
SSK-2	K-2 / Bass	
SSK-3	K-3 / Bonita	
SF-1	AA-1 / T-1	Also SS-52
SF-2	AA-2 / T-2	Also SS-60
SF-3	AA-3 / T-3	Also SS-61
SF-4	V-1 / Barracuda	Also SS-163
SF-5	V-2 / Bass	Also SS-164
SF-6	V-3 / Bonita	Also SS-165
SF-7	V-4 / Argonaut	
SM-1	Argonaut	
SS-1	Holland	Unique submarine
SS-2	Plunger / A-1	Lead boat of a class of 7
SS-3	Adder / A-2	
SS-4	Grampus / A-3	
SS-5	Moccasin / A-4	
SS-6	Pike / A-5	
SS-7	Porpoise / A-6	
SS-8	Shark / A-7	
SS-9	Octopus / C-1	Lead boat of a class of 5
SS-10	Viper / B-1	Lead boat of a class of 3
SS-11	Cuttlefish / B-2	
SS-12	Tarantula / B-3	
SS-13	Stingray / C-2	
SS-14	Tarpon / C-3	
SS-15	Bonita / C-4	
SS-16	Snapper / C-5	
SS-17	Narwhal / D-1	Lead boat of a class of 3
SS-18	Grayling / D-2	
SS-19	Salmon / D-3	
SS-19½	Seal / G-1	Lead boat of a class of 4
SS-20	Carp / F-1	Lead boat of a class of 4. Lost in collision on 17 Dec 1917.
SS-21	Barracuda / F-2	
SSN-21	Seawolf	Lead boat of a class of three. Commissioned 1997
SS-22	Pickerel / F-3	
SSN-22	Connecticut	Second of three Seawolf-class. Commissioned 1998
SS-23	Skate / F-4	Foundered and lost on 25 Mar 1915. Raised but not repaired. First US submarine to be lost.
SSN-23	Jimmy Carter	Third of three Seawolf-class. Commissioned 2005
SS-24	Skipjack / E-1	Lead boat of a class of 2
SS-25	Sturgeon / E-2	
SS-26	Thrasher / G-4	
SS-27	Tuna / G-2	Sank at moorings 30 July 1919, drowned 3 crew
SS-28	Seawolf / H-1	Lead boat of a class of 9. Grounded 12 Mar 1920. Lost during salvage operations 24 Mar 1920.
SS-29	Nautilus / H-2	
SS-30	Garfish / H-3	
SS-31	Turbot / G-3	
SS-32	Haddock / K-1	Lead boat of a class of 8
SS-33	Cachalot / K-2	
SS-34	Orca / K-3	
SS-35	Walrus / K-4	
SS-36	K-5	
SS-37	K-6	
SS-38	K-7	
SS-39	K-8	
SS-40	L-1	Lead boat of a class of 11
SS-41	L-2	
SS-42	L-3	
SS-43	L-4	
SS-44	L-5	
SS-45	L-6	
SS-46	L-7	
SS-47	M-1	Unique submarine
SS-48	L-8	
SS-49	L-9	
SS-50	L-10	
SS-51	L-11	
SS-52	Schley / AA-1 / T-1	Lead boat of a class of 3. Also SF-1
SS-53	N-1	Lead boat of a class of 7
SS-54	N-2	
SS-55	N-3	
SS-56	N-4	
SS-57	N-5	
SS-58	N-6	
SS-59	N-7	
SS-60	AA-2 / T-2	Also SF-2
SS-61	AA-3 / T-3	Also SF-3
SS-62	O-1	Lead boat of a class of 16
SS-63	O-2	Recommissioned in 1941, Oldest US sub to serve in WWII, one of only eight subs that served in both WWI and WWII
SS-64	O-3	Served in both WWI and WWII
SS-65	O-4	Served in both WWI and WWII
SS-66	O-5	Lost in collision 28 Oct 1923.
SS-67	O-6	Served in both WWI and WWII
SS-68	O-7	Served in both WWI and WWII
SS-69	O-8	Served in both WWI and WWII
SS-70	O-9	Served in both WWI and WWII, Lost in accident 20 Jun 1941.
SS-71	O-10	Served in both WWI and WWII
SS-72	O-11	
SS-73	O-12	Used in 1931 Wilkins arctic expedition and scuttled.
SS-74	O-13	
SS-75	O-14	
SS-76	O-15	
SS-77	O-16	
SS-78	R-1	Lead boat of a class of 27
SS-79	R-2	Oldest continuously commissioned sub to serve in WWII (1919−1945)
SS-80	R-3	Transferred to Royal Navy as HMS P511
SS-81	R-4	
SS-82	R-5	
SS-83	R-6	
SS-84	R-7	
SS-85	R-8	
SS-86	R-9	
SS-87	R-10	
SS-88	R-11	
SS-89	R-12	Foundered 12 Jun 1943.
SS-90	R-13	
SS-91	R-14	
SS-92	R-15	
SS-93	R-16	
SS-94	R-17	Transferred to Royal Navy as HMS P512
SS-95	R-18	
SS-96	R-19	Transferred to Royal Navy 9 March 1942 as HMS P513, rammed by Royal Canadian Navy minesweeper on 21 June 1942 and sank with all hands.
SS-97	R-20	
SS-98	R-21	
SS-99	R-22	
SS-100	R-23	
SS-101	R-24	
SS-102	R-25	
SS-103	R-26	
SS-104	R-27	
SS-105	S-1	Lead boat of a class of 51
SS-106	S-2	
SS-107	S-3	
SS-108		Cancelled
SS-109	S-4	Lost in accident 17 Dec 1927.
SS-110	S-5	Lost in accident 1 Dec 1920.
SS-111	S-6	
SS-112	S-7	
SS-113	S-8	
SS-114	S-9	
SS-115	S-10	
SS-116	S-11	
SS-117	S-12	
SS-118	S-13	
SS-119	S-14	
SS-120	S-15	
SS-121	S-16	
SS-122	S-17	
SS-123	S-18	
SS-124	S-19	
SS-125	S-20	
SS-126	S-21	
SS-127	S-22	
SS-128	S-23	
SS-129	S-24	
SS-130	S-25	Transferred to the Royal Navy 4 November 1941 and renamed as HMS P551 then transferred to the Polish Navy in exile and renamed ORP Jastrząb. On 2 May 1942 she was sunk by British forces in a friendly fire incident.
SS-131	S-26	Sunk in collision 24 Jan 1942.
SS-132	S-27	Lost by grounding 19 Jun 1942.
SS-133	S-28	Foundered 4 Jul 1944.
SS-134	S-29	
SS-135	S-30	
SS-136	S-31	
SS-137	S-32	
SS-138	S-33	
SS-139	S-34	
SS-140	S-35	
SS-141	S-36	Lost by grounding 20 Jan 1942.
SS-142	S-37	
SS-143	S-38	
SS-144	S-39	Lost by grounding 14 Aug 1942.
SS-145	S-40	
SS-146	S-41	
SS-147	H-4	
SS-148	H-5	
SS-149	H-6	
SS-150	H-7	
SS-151	H-8	
SS-152	H-9	
SS-153	S-42	
SS-154	S-43	
SS-155	S-44	Sunk by Japanese destroyer on 7 Oct 1943.
SS-156	S-45	
SS-157	S-46	
SS-158	S-47	
SS-159	S-48	Sank during a builders trial on 7 December 1921. Was raised 2 weeks later and repaired.
SS-160	S-49	Used as a privately owned traveling tourist attraction from 1931 to 1941.
SS-161	S-50	
SS-162	S-51	Lost in collision 25 Sep 1925.
SS-163	Barracuda	Lead boat of a class of 3. Previously SF-4
SS-164	Bass	Previously SF-5
SS-165	Bonita	Previously SF-6
SS-166	Argonaut	Unique submarine. Never formally held SS-166 classification. Variously designated as V-4, SF-7, SM-1, A-1 and APS-1. Sunk by Japanese destroyers 10 Jan 1943.
SS-167	Narwhal	Lead boat of a class of 2
SS-168	Nautilus	
SS-169	Dolphin	Unique submarine
SS-170	Cachalot	Lead boat of a class of 2
SS-171	Cuttlefish	
SS-172	Porpoise	Lead boat of a class of 10
SS-173	Pike	
SS-174	Shark	Sunk by Japanese destroyer Feb 11 1942.
SS-175	Tarpon	Foundered in deep water, south of Cape Hatteras, North Carolina, on 26 August 1957, while under tow to the scrap yard.
SS-176	Perch	Scuttled 3 March 1942 after damage from Japanese ships.
SS-177	Pickerel	Sunk 3 April 1943 by Japanese ships.
SS-178	Pinna / Permit	
SS-179	Plunger	
SS-180	Pollack	
SS-181	Pompano	Possibly sunk by mine October 1943.
SS-182	Salmon	Lead boat of a class of 6
SS-183	Seal	
SS-184	Skipjack	Sunk in Operation Crossroads atomic bomb test, 25 July 1946
SS-185	Snapper	
SS-186	Stingray	
SS-187	Sturgeon	
SS-188	Sargo	Lead boat of a class of 10
SS-189	Saury	
SS-190	Spearfish	
SS-191	Sculpin	Helped locate the sunken Squalus 24 May 1939. Damaged by Japanese destroyer 19 Nov 1943 and scuttled to avoid capture. Captain John P. Cromwell chose to go down with the ship, earning himself the Medal of Honor.
SS-192	Squalus / Sailfish	Sunk in accident 23 May 1939. Raised, repaired and re-commissioned as USS Sailfish on 15 May 1940. Sank Japanese aircraft carrier Chūyō 3 Dec 1943 which was carrying survivors of Sculpin (SS-191).
SS-193	Swordfish	Sunk by Japanese ships 12 Jan 1945.
SS-194	Seadragon	
SS-195	Sealion	Destroyed by Japanese aircraft 10 Dec 1941. First US submarine lost in World War II.
SS-196	Searaven	
SS-197	Seawolf	Accidentally sunk by US Navy destroyer escort 3 Oct 1944.
SS-198	Tambor	Lead boat of a class of 12
SS-199	Tautog	Highest scoring US submarine of World War II.
SS-200	Thresher	
SS-201	Triton	Sunk 15 April 1943 by Japanese destroyers.
SS-202	Trout	Lost around 29 Feb 1944, possibly mine.
SS-203	Tuna	
SS-204	Mackerel	Lead boat of a class of 2
SS-205	Marlin	
SS-206	Gar	
SS-207	Grampus	Sunk by Japanese destroyers 5 Mar 1943.
SS-208	Grayback	Sunk by Japanese aircraft 26 Feb 1944.
SS-209	Grayling	Sunk by Japanese freighter 9 Sep 1943.
SS-210	Grenadier	Sunk by Japanese aircraft 22 Apr 1943.
SS-211	Gudgeon	Probably sunk by Japanese on 18 Apr 1944.
SS-212	Gato	Lead boat of a class of 77
SS-213	Greenling	
SS-214	Grouper	Converted to SSK in 1951, then AGSS sonar research in 1960
SS-215	Growler	Sunk by Japanese ships 8 Nov 1944.
SS-216	Grunion	Sunk 30 Jul 1942, cause unknown.
SS-217	Guardfish	
SS-218	Albacore	Best known for sinking Japanese aircraft carrier Taihō with one torpedo. Sunk by mine 7 Nov 1944.
SS-219	Amberjack	Sunk by Japanese ships on 16 Feb 1943.
SS-220	Barb	Only known sub to launch a land attack on Japan on 12th patrol June 1945. GUPPY IB conversion 1955
SS-221	Blackfish	
SS-222	Bluefish	
SS-223	Bonefish	Sunk 18 June 1945 by Japanese vessels
SS-224	Cod	Museum ship in Cleveland, Ohio 's North Coast Harbor at the USS Cod Submarine Memorial since 1 May 1976.
SS-225	Cero	
SS-226	Corvina	Sunk by Japanese submarine 16 Nov 1943.
SS-227	Darter	Grounded on 24 Oct 1944. Destroyed to prevent capture.
SS-228	Drum	Museum ship in Mobile, AL.
SS-229	Flying Fish	
SS-230	Finback	
SS-231	Haddock	
SS-232	Halibut	
SS-233	Herring	Sunk 1 June 1944 by shore battery.
SS-234	Kingfish	
SS-235	Shad	
SS-236	Silversides	Top scoring surviving U.S. submarine of WWII. Currently resides in Muskegon, MI at the Great Lakes Naval Memorial & Museum.
SS-237	Trigger	Sunk 27 March 1945 by Japanese ships.
SS-238	Wahoo	Sunk by Japanese ships and aircraft 11 Oct 1943.
SS-239	Whale	
SS-240	Angler	Converted to SSK in 1953
SS-241	Bashaw	Converted to SSK in 1953
SS-242	Bluegill	Converted to SSK in 1953
SS-243	Bream	Converted to SSK in 1953
SS-244	Cavalla	Best known for sinking Japanese carrier Shōkaku. Converted to SSK in 1953. Museum ship in Galveston, Texas.
SS-245	Cobia	Museum ship in Manitiwoc, WI.
SS-246	Croaker	Converted to SSK in 1953. Museum ship in Buffalo, NY.
SS-247	Dace	GUPPY IB conversion 1955
SS-248	Dorado	Accidentally sunk by US aircraft 12 Oct 1943.
SS-249	Flasher	Credited with over 100,000 tons of Japanese shipping sunk in WWII.
SS-250	Flier	Sunk 13 Aug 1944 by mine. 8 Survivors
SS-251	Flounder	
SS-252	Gabilan	
SS-253	Gunnel	
SS-254	Gurnard	
SS-255	Haddo	
SS-256	Hake	
SS-257	Harder	Sunk by Japanese ships 24 August 1944.
SS-258	Hoe	
SS-259	Jack	Fleet snorkel conversion 1958
SS-260	Lapon	Fleet snorkel conversion 1957
SS-261	Mingo	
SS-262	Muskallunge	
SS-263	Paddle	
SS-264	Pargo	
SS-265	Peto	
SS-266	Pogy	
SS-267	Pompon	Converted to SSR in 1953.
SS-268	Puffer	
SS-269	Rasher	Converted to SSR in 1953.
SS-270	Raton	Converted to SSR in 1953.
SS-271	Ray	Converted to SSR in 1952.
SS-272	Redfin	Converted to SSR in 1953, then to AGSS inertial guidance research in 1963.
SS-273	Robalo	Sunk by mine 26 Jul 1944.
SS-274	Rock	Converted to SSR in 1953.
SS-275	Runner	Missing and presumed lost Jun 1943.
SS-276	Sawfish	
SS-277	Scamp	Sunk by Japanese ship 6 Nov 1944.
SS-278	Scorpion	Probably sunk by mine 1944.
SS-279	Snook	Sunk April 1945, cause unknown.
SS-280	Steelhead	
SS-281	Sunfish	
SS-282	Tunny	Converted to SSG Regulus missile submarine in 1953, then to amphibious warfare transport submarine APSS in 1966, LPSS in 1969.
SS-283	Tinosa	
SS-284	Tullibee	Sunk by own torpedo 24 March 1944.
SS-285	Balao	Lead boat of a class of 120
SS-286	Billfish	
SS-287	Bowfin	Museum ship, USS Bowfin Submarine Museum & Park, Honolulu, Hawaii
SS-288	Cabrilla	
SS-289	Capelin	Missing and presumed lost Dec 1943.
SS-290	Cisco	Sunk by Japanese ships and aircraft 28 Sep 1943.
SS-291	Crevalle	
SS-292	Devilfish	
SS-293	Dragonet	
SS-294	Escolar	Sunk by mine Oct 1944.
SS-295	Hackleback	
SS-296	Lancetfish	Commissioned 12 Feb 1945. Sunk at pier 15 Mar 1945. Decommissioned 24 Mar 1945. Not repaired. Stricken 9 June 1958. Never went to sea.
SS-297	Ling	Museum ship, New Jersey Naval Museum — Hackensack, New Jersey
SS-298	Lionfish	Museum ship, Battleship Cove Museum, Fall River, Massachusetts
SS-299	Manta	
SS-300	Moray	
SS-301	Roncador	
SS-302	Sabalo	Fleet snorkel conversion 1952
SS-303	Sablefish	Fleet snorkel conversion 1951
SS-304	Seahorse	
SS-305	Skate	
SS-306	Tang	Second highest scoring US submarine of World War II. Sunk by circular run of own torpedo on 24 Oct 1944.
SS-307	Tilefish	
SS-308	Apogon	
SS-309	Aspro	
SS-310	Batfish	Museum ship, War Memorial Park, Muskogee, Oklahoma
SS-311	Archerfish	Best known for sinking the Japanese carrier Shinano, in November 1944,
SS-312	Burrfish	
SS-313	Perch	
SS-314	Shark	Lost 24 Oct 1944.
SS-315	Sealion	
SS-316	Barbel	Sunk 4 Feb 1945 by Japanese aircraft.
SS-317	Barbero	Converted to SSA in 1948, then to SSG Regulus missile submarine in 1955.
SS-318	Baya	
SS-319	Becuna	GUPPY IA conversion 1951, Museum ship, Independence Seaport Museum, Philadelphia, Pennsylvania
SS-320	Bergall	Fleet snorkel conversion 1952
SS-321	Besugo	
SS-322	Blackfin	GUPPY IA conversion 1951
SS-323	Caiman	GUPPY IA conversion 1951
SS-324	Blenny	GUPPY IA conversion 1951
SS-325	Blower	Fleet snorkel conversion 1950
SS-326	Blueback	Fleet snorkel conversion 1953
SS-327	Boarfish	Fleet snorkel conversion 1953
SS-328	Charr	Fleet snorkel conversion 1951
SS-329	Chub	Fleet snorkel conversion 1953
SS-330	Brill	Fleet snorkel conversion 1953
SS-331	Bugara	Fleet snorkel conversion 1951
SS-332	Bullhead	Lost 6 Aug 1945. Last US submarine loss of WWII.
SS-333	Bumper	Fleet snorkel conversion 1950
SS-334	Cabezon	
SS-335	Dentuda	
SS-336	Capitaine	
SS-337	Carbonero	
SS-338	Carp	Fleet snorkel conversion 1952
SS-339	Catfish	GUPPY II conversion 1949
SS-340	Entemedor	GUPPY IIA conversion 1952
SS-341	Chivo	GUPPY IA conversion 1951
SS-342	Chopper	GUPPY IA conversion 1951
SS-343	Clamagore	GUPPY II conversion 1948, GUPPY III conversion 1962
SS-344	Cobbler	GUPPY II conversion 1948, GUPPY III conversion 1962
SS-345	Cochino	GUPPY II conversion 1948, Lost 26 Aug 1949 by fire and electrical failure.
SS-346	Corporal	GUPPY II conversion 1948, GUPPY III conversion 1962
SS-347	Cubera	GUPPY II conversion 1948
SS-348	Cusk	
SS-349	Diodon	GUPPY II conversion 1948
SS-350	Dogfish	GUPPY II conversion 1948
SS-351	Greenfish	GUPPY II conversion 1948, GUPPY III conversion 1961
SS-352	Halfbeak	GUPPY II conversion 1948
SS-353	Dugong	Cancelled
SS-354	Eel	Cancelled
SS-355	Espada	Cancelled
SS-356	Fanegal / Jawfish	Cancelled
SS-357	Friar / Ono	Cancelled
SS-358	Garlopa	Cancelled
SS-359	Garrupa	Cancelled
SS-360	Goldring	Cancelled
SS-361	Golet	Lost 14 Jun 1944 to Japanese vessels.
SS-362	Guavina	Converted to tanker for amphibious and seaplane support (SSO in 1948, AGSS in 1951, AOSS in 1957)
SS-363	Guitarro	Fleet snorkel conversion 1954
SS-364	Hammerhead	Fleet snorkel conversion 1954
SS-365	Hardhead	GUPPY IIA conversion 1953
SS-366	Hawkbill	GUPPY IB conversion 1953
SS-367	Icefish	GUPPY IB conversion 1953
SS-368	Jallao	GUPPY IIA conversion 1954
SS-369	Kete	Lost Mar 1945, cause unknown.
SS-370	Kraken	Fleet snorkel conversion 1959
SS-371	Lagarto	Sunk 4 May 1945 by Japanese ships.
SS-372	Lamprey	
SS-373	Lizardfish	
SS-374	Loggerhead	
SS-375	Macabi	
SS-376	Mapiro	Fleet snorkel conversion 1960
SS-377	Menhaden	GUPPY IIA conversion 1953
SS-378	Mero	
SS-379	Needlefish	Cancelled
SS-380	Nerka	Cancelled
SS-381	Sand Lance	
SS-382	Picuda	GUPPY IIA conversion 1953
SS-383	Pampanito	Museum ship, S. F. Maritime National Park, San Francisco, California
SS-384	Parche	
SS-385	Bang	GUPPY IIA conversion 1953
SS-386	Pilotfish	
SS-387	Pintado	
SS-388	Pipefish	
SS-389	Piranha	
SS-390	Plaice	
SS-391	Pomfret	GUPPY IIA conversion 1953
SS-392	Sterlet	Fleet snorkel conversion 1952
SS-393	Queenfish	
SS-394	Razorback	GUPPY IIA conversion 1954, Museum ship, Arkansas Inland Maritime Museum, North Little Rock, Arkansas
SS-395	Redfish	
SS-396	Ronquil	GUPPY IIA conversion 1953
SS-397	Scabbardfish	Fleet snorkel conversion 1965
SS-398	Segundo	Fleet snorkel conversion 1951
SS-399	Sea Cat	
SS-400	Sea Devil	
SS-401	Sea Dog	
SS-402	Sea Fox	GUPPY IIA conversion 1953
SS-403	Atule	GUPPY IA conversion 1951
SS-404	Spikefish	
SS-405	Sea Owl	Fleet snorkel conversion 1951
SS-406	Sea Poacher	GUPPY IA conversion 1952
SS-407	Sea Robin	GUPPY IA conversion 1951
SS-408	Sennet	Fleet snorkel conversion 1952
SS-409	Piper	Fleet snorkel conversion 1951
SS-410	Threadfin	GUPPY IIA conversion 1953
SS-411	Spadefish	
SS-412	Trepang	
SS-413	Spot	
SS-414	Springer	
SS-415	Stickleback	Lost 29 May 1958.
SS-416	Tiru	GUPPY II completion 1948, GUPPY III conversion 1959
SS-417	Tench	Lead boat of a class of 29. GUPPY IA conversion 1951, sold to Peru for spare parts, 16 September 1976.
SS-418	Thornback	GUPPY IIA conversion 1953, transferred to Turkey on 1 July 1971.
SS-419	Tigrone	Rescued over 30 downed aviators during World War II. Converted to SSR in 1948, then to AGSS for sonar research in 1964. Last submarine which served in World War II in service in the U.S. Navy.
SS-420	Tirante	GUPPY IIA conversion 1953
SS-421	Tomtate / Trutta	GUPPY IIA conversion 1953, transferred to Turkey on 1 July 1972.
SS-422	Toro	
SS-423	Torsk	Fleet snorkel conversion 1952; Museum ship, Baltimore Maritime Museum, Baltimore, Maryland
SS-424	Quillback	GUPPY IIA conversion 1953
SS-425	Trumpetfish	GUPPY II conversion 1948, GUPPY III conversion 1962, transferred to Brazil on 15 October 1973.
SS-426	Tusk	GUPPY II conversion 1948, transferred to Republic of China on 18 October 1973.
SS-427	Turbot	Launched but not completed
SS-428	Ulua	Launched but not completed
SS-429	Unicorn	Cancelled
SS-430	Vendace	Cancelled
SS-431	Walrus	Cancelled
SS-432	Whitefish	Cancelled
SS-433	Whiting	Cancelled
SS-434	Wolffish	Cancelled
SS-435	Corsair	
SS-436	Unicorn	Launched but not completed.
SS-437	Walrus	Launched but not completed.
SS-438 – SS-474		Cancelled
SS-475	Argonaut	Fleet snorkel conversion 1952. Transferred to Canada on 2 December 1968.
SS-476	Runner	Fleet snorkel conversion 1952
SS-477	Conger	
SS-478	Cutlass	GUPPY II conversion 1948, transferred to Republic of China on 15 April 1973.
SS-479	Diablo	Transferred to Pakistan on 1 June 1974.
SS-480	Medregal	Fleet snorkel conversion 1952
SS-481	Requin	Converted to SSR in 1946. Museum ship, Kamin Science Center, Pittsburgh, Pennsylvania.
SS-482	Irex	Fleet snorkel conversion 1947 (prototype)
SS-483	Sea Leopard	GUPPY II conversion 1949, transferred to Brazil on 27 March 1973.
SS-484	Odax	GUPPY I conversion 1947, GUPPY II conversion 1951, transferred to Brazil on 8 July 1972.
SS-485	Sirago	GUPPY II conversion 1949
SS-486	Pomodon	GUPPY I conversion 1947, GUPPY II conversion 1951
SS-487	Remora	GUPPY II conversion 1947, GUPPY III conversion 1962, transferred to Greece on 29 October 1973.
SS-488	Sarda	
SS-489	Spinax	Converted to SSR in 1946
SS-490	Volador	Last fleet submarine to be launched on 17 Jan 1946. GUPPY II completion 1948, GUPPY III conversion 1963. Transferred to Italy on 18 August 1972.
SS-491	Pompano	Cancelled
SS-492	Grayling	Cancelled
SS-493	Needlefish	Cancelled
SS-494	Sculpin	Cancelled
SS-495 – SS-521		Cancelled
SS-522	Amberjack	GUPPY II conversion 1947
SS-523	Grampus	GUPPY II completion 1949
SS-524	Pickerel	GUPPY II completion 1949, GUPPY III conversion 1962
SS-525	Grenadier	GUPPY II completion, last fleet submarine to be commissioned on 10 Feb 1951.
SS-526	Dorado	Cancelled
SS-527	Comber	Cancelled
SS-528	Sea Panther	Cancelled
SS-529	Tiburon	Cancelled
SS-530 – SS-549		Cancelled
SS-550	Barracuda	Lead boat of a class of 3. Also designated as SSK-1 and SST-3.
SS-551	Bass	Also designated as SSK-2.
SS-552	Bonita	Also designated as SSK-3.
SS-553	Kinn	Cancelled, offshore procurement of HNoMS Kinn (S316)
SS-554	Springeren	Cancelled, offshore procurement of HDMS Springeren (S329)
AGSS-555	Dolphin	Unique research submarine. Last conventionally powered submarine in service with the US Navy. Museum ship, Maritime Museum of San Diego, San Diego, California
SS-556		Offshore procurement for Norway
SS-557 – SS-562		Cancelled
SS-563	Tang	Lead boat of a class of 6
SS-564	Trigger	
SS-565	Wahoo	
SS-566	Trout	
SS-567	Gudgeon	
SS-568	Harder	
AGSS-569	Albacore	Unique experimental prototype with teardrop hull. Underwater world speed record holder. Museum ship, Albacore Park and Museum, Portsmouth, New Hampshire
AGSS-570	Mackerel	Completed as SST-1
SSN-571	Nautilus	First nuclear powered submarine. First submarine to travel under the North Pole. Museum ship, U.S. Navy Submarine Force Museum, Groton, Connecticut
SSR-572	Sailfish	Lead boat of a class of 2
SSR-573	Salmon	
SSG-574	Grayback	Lead boat of a class of 2. Converted and re-designated as LPSS-574 (amphibious transport submarine) on 30 Aug 1968.
SSN-575	Seawolf	Unique submarine
SS-576	Darter	Unique submarine
SSG-577	Growler	Museum ship, Intrepid Sea-Air-Space Museum, New York, New York
SSN-578	Skate	Lead boat of a class of 4. First submarine to surface at the North Pole.
SSN-579	Swordfish	
SS-580	Barbel	Lead boat of a class of 3. First diesel-powered attack submarine with a teardrop hull.
SS-581	Blueback	Last conventionally powered attack submarine in service with the US Navy. Museum ship, OMSI Museum, Portland, Oregon
SS-582	Bonefish	Last conventionally powered submarine built for the US Navy. Laid after Blueback but launched and commissioned before
SSN-583	Sargo	
SSN-584	Seadragon	First submarine to complete a submerged circumnavigation of the Northwest Passage.
SSN-585	Skipjack	Lead boat of a class of 6. First nuclear powered submarine with a teardrop hull.
SSRN-586	Triton	Unique submarine. First submarine to complete a submerged circumnavigation of the globe, and the only Western submarine powered by two nuclear reactors.
SSGN-587	Halibut	Unique submarine. First and only American nuclear powered submarine designed and built as a guided missile submarine.
SSN-588	Scamp	
SSN-589	Scorpion	Lost in accident 22 May 1968.
SSN-590	Sculpin	
SSN-591	Shark	
SSN-592	Snook	
SSN-593	Thresher	Lead boat of a class of 14. Lost in accident 10 Apr 1963.
SSN-594	Permit	
SSN-595	Plunger	
SSN-596	Barb	
SSN-597	Tullibee	Unique quiet nuclear submarine with turbo electric drive. First integrated sonar suite, including both a low-frequency passive array, for long range detection, and a spherical array, for approach and attack (AN/BQQ Series Sonar). Only nuclear submarine specifically designed as an ASW (Anti-Submarine Warfare) weapon (i.e., a SSKN). First submarine with torpedo tubes amidships.
SSBN-598	George Washington	Lead boat of a class of 5. First nuclear powered ballistic missile submarine.
SSBN-599	Patrick Henry	
SSBN-600	Theodore Roosevelt	
SSBN-601	Robert E. Lee	
SSBN-602	Abraham Lincoln	
SSN-603	Pollack	
SSN-604	Haddo	
SSN-605	Jack	Had a unique direct-drive plant with two contra-rotating propellers on concentric shafts to reduce blade rate noise
SSN-606	Tinosa	
SSN-607	Dace	
SSBN-608	Ethan Allen	Lead boat of a class of 5
SSBN-609	Sam Houston	
SSBN-610	Thomas A. Edison	
SSBN-611	John Marshall	
SSN-612	Guardfish	
SSN-613	Flasher	
SSN-614	Greenling	
SSN-615	Gato	
SSBN-616	Lafayette	Lead boat of a class of 9
SSBN-617	Alexander Hamilton	
SSBN-618	Thomas Jefferson	
SSBN-619	Andrew Jackson	
SSBN-620	John Adams	
SSN-621	Haddock	
SSBN-622	James Monroe	
SSBN-623	Nathan Hale	
SSBN-624	Woodrow Wilson	Sail is located at Deterrent Park, Naval Submarine Base, Bangor, WA.
SSBN-625	Henry Clay	
SSBN-626	Daniel Webster	Decommissioned on 30 August 1990 and reclassified a moored training ship (S5W Prototype facility) with hull number MTS-626.
SSBN-627	James Madison	Lead boat of a class of 10
SSBN-628	Tecumseh	
SSBN-629	Daniel Boone	
SSBN-630	John C. Calhoun	
SSBN-631	Ulysses S. Grant	
SSBN-632	Von Steuben	
SSBN-633	Casimir Pulaski	
SSBN-634	Stonewall Jackson	
SSBN-635	Sam Rayburn	Decommissioned on 31 July 1989 and reclassified a moored training ship (S5W prototype facility) with hull number MTS-635.
SSBN-636	Nathanael Greene	
SSN-637	Sturgeon	Lead boat of a class of 37
SSN-638	Whale	
SSN-639	Tautog	
SSBN-640	Benjamin Franklin	Lead boat of a class of 12
SSBN-641	Simon Bolivar	
SSBN-642	Kamehameha	Was in active service for 36 years, 4 months. Built as a SSBN but converted to a SSN from 24 September 1992 to 23 Jul 1993
SSBN-643	George Bancroft	Sail is located at Naval Submarine Base, Kings Bay, GA
SSBN-644	Lewis and Clark	
SSBN-645	James K. Polk	Built as a SSBN but converted to a SSN in August 1994. The "Jimmy P's" sail is now on display at the National Museum of Nuclear Science and History in Albuquerque, NM.
SSN-646	Grayling	
SSN-647	Pogy	
SSN-648	Aspro	
SSN-649	Sunfish	
SSN-650	Pargo	
SSN-651	Queenfish	
SSN-652	Puffer	
SSN-653	Ray	
SSBN-654	George C. Marshall	
SSBN-655	Henry L. Stimson	
SSBN-656	George Washington Carver	
SSBN-657	Francis Scott Key	
SSBN-658	Mariano G. Vallejo	Sail is on display at Mare Island, Vallejo, CA
SSBN-659	Will Rogers	
SSN-660	Sand Lance	
SSN-661	Lapon	Sail on display at American Legion chapter 639, Springfield, MO
SSN-662	Gurnard	
SSN-663	Hammerhead	
SSN-664	Sea Devil	
SSN-665	Guitarro	
SSN-666	Hawkbill	The sail is currently on display in Arco, ID
SSN-667	Bergall	
SSN-668	Spadefish	
SSN-669	Seahorse	
SSN-670	Finback	
SSN-671	Narwhal	Unique submarine constructed with a natural circulation reactor and other silencing features.
SSN-672	Pintado	
SSN-673	Flying Fish	
SSN-674	Trepang	
SSN-675	Bluefish	
SSN-676	Billfish	
SSN-677	Drum	The sail is currently on display at U.S. Navy Recruit Training Command, Great Lakes, Illinois
SSN-678	Archerfish	
SSN-679	Silversides	
SSN-680	William H. Bates	
SSN-681	Batfish	
SSN-682	Tunny	
SSN-683	Parche	
SSN-684	Cavalla	Last U.S. Navy submarine to be named after a fish until USS Seawolf (SSN-21).
SSN-685	Glenard P. Lipscomb	Unique attack submarine design using turbo-electric transmission.
SSN-686	L. Mendel Rivers	
SSN-687	Richard B. Russell	
SSN-688	Los Angeles	Lead boat of her class of 62. Was active for 34 years, 3 months.
SSN-689	Baton Rouge	
SSN-690	Philadelphia	
SSN-691	Memphis	
SSN-692	Omaha	
SSN-693	Cincinnati	
SSN-694	Groton	
SSN-695	Birmingham	
SSN-696	New York City	
SSN-697	Indianapolis	
SSN-698	Bremerton	
SSN-699	Jacksonville	
SSN-700	Dallas	
SSN-701	La Jolla	Decommissioned in 2019 and reclassified MTS-701 following conversion to a moored training ship
SSN-702	Phoenix	
SSN-703	Boston	
SSN-704	Baltimore	
SSN-705	City of Corpus Christi	
SSN-706	Albuquerque	
SSN-707	Portsmouth	
SSN-708	Minneapolis–Saint Paul	
SSN-709	Hyman G. Rickover	
SSN-710	Augusta	
SSN-711	San Francisco	Decommissioned in 2022 and reclassified MTS-711 following conversion to a moored training ship
SSN-712	Atlanta	
SSN-713	Houston	
SSN-714	Norfolk	
SSN-715	Buffalo	
SSN-716	Salt Lake City	
SSN-717	Olympia	
SSN-718	Honolulu	
SSN-719	Providence	
SSN-720	Pittsburgh	
SSN-721	Chicago	
SSN-722	Key West	
SSN-723	Oklahoma City	
SSN-724	Louisville	
SSN-725	Helena	
SSGN-726	Ohio	Lead boat of her class of 18. Built as an SSBN, but converted to an SSGN from November 2003 to December 2005 in accordance with START II. Oldest commissioned American nuclear submarine still in active service.
SSGN-727	Michigan	Built as an SSBN, but converted to an SSGN from April 2004 to April 2006 in accordance with START II. Oldest built American nuclear submarine still in active service.
SSGN-728	Florida	Built as an SSBN, but converted to an SSGN from January 2005 to December 2006 in accordance with START II.
SSGN-729	Georgia	Built as an SSBN, but converted to an SSGN from October 2005 to September 2007 in accordance with START II.
SSBN-730	Henry M. Jackson	
SSBN-731	Alabama	
SSBN-732	Alaska	
SSBN-733	Nevada	
SSBN-734	Tennessee	
SSBN-735	Pennsylvania	
SSBN-736	West Virginia	
SSBN-737	Kentucky	
SSBN-738	Maryland	
SSBN-739	Nebraska	
SSBN-740	Rhode Island	
SSBN-741	Maine	
SSBN-742	Wyoming	
SSBN-743	Louisiana	
SSN-744 – SSN-749	Unassigned	Originally reserved for 19th-24th Ohio-class submarines but they were cancelled.
SSN-750	Newport News	Oldest American nuclear fast attack submarine still in service.
SSN-751	San Juan	
SSN-752	Pasadena	
SSN-753	Albany	
SSN-754	Topeka	
SSN-755	Miami	Lost to arson during maintenance overhaul
SSN-756	Scranton	
SSN-757	Alexandria	
SSN-758	Asheville	
SSN-759	Jefferson City	
SSN-760	Annapolis	
SSN-761	Springfield	
SSN-762	Columbus	
SSN-763	Santa Fe	
SSN-764	Boise	
SSN-765	Montpelier	
SSN-766	Charlotte	
SSN-767	Hampton	
SSN-768	Hartford	
SSN-769	Toledo	
SSN-770	Tucson	
SSN-771	Columbia	
SSN-772	Greeneville	
SSN-773	Cheyenne	
SSN-774	Virginia	Lead boat of her class
SSN-775	Texas	
SSN-776	Hawaii	
SSN-777	North Carolina	
SSN-778	New Hampshire	
SSN-779	New Mexico	
SSN-780	Missouri	
SSN-781	California	
SSN-782	Mississippi	
SSN-783	Minnesota	
SSN-784	North Dakota	
SSN-785	John Warner	
SSN-786	Illinois	
SSN-787	Washington	
SSN-788	Colorado	
SSN-789	Indiana	
SSN-790	South Dakota	
SSN-791	Delaware	
SSN-792	Vermont	
SSN-793	Oregon	
SSN-794	Montana	
SSN-795	Hyman G. Rickover	
SSN-796	New Jersey	
SSN-797	Iowa	
SSN-798	Massachusetts	
SSN-799	Idaho	
SSN-800	Arkansas	
SSN-801	Utah	
SSN-802	Oklahoma	
SSGN-803	Arizona	
SSGN-804	Barb	
SSGN-805	Tang	
SSGN-806	Wahoo	
SSGN-807	Silversides	
SSGN-808	John H. Dalton	
SSGN-809	Long Island	
SSGN-810	San Francisco	
SSGN-811	Miami	
SSGN-812	Baltimore	
SSGN-813	Atlanta	
SSGN-814	Potomac	
SSGN-815	Norfolk	
SSGN-816	Brooklyn	
SSGN-817 – SSGN-825	Currently unassigned	Currently unassigned, but expected to be assigned to subsequent Virginia-class boats
SSBN-826	District of Columbia	Lead boat of her class
SSBN-827	Wisconsin	
SSBN-828	Groton	
829-837	Currently unassigned	Currently unassigned, but expected to be assigned to subsequent Columbia-class boats
SST-1 (AGSS-570)	Mackerel	Lead boat of her class of 2
SST-2	Marlin	Museum Ship, Freedom Park, Omaha, Nebraska
X-1	X-1	Unique experimental midget submarine.
SM U-111	U-111	Captured World War I U-boat, used for publicity and testing purposes
SM U-117	U-117	Captured World War I U-boat, used for publicity and testing purposes
SM U-140	U-140	Captured World War I U-boat, used for publicity and testing purposes
SM UB-88	UB-88	Captured World War I U-boat, used for publicity and testing purposes
SM UB-148	UB-148	Captured World War I U-boat, used for publicity and testing purposes
SM UC-97	UC-97	Captured World War I U-boat, used for publicity and testing purposes
U-2513	U-2513	captured World War II U-boat, used for publicity and testing purposes
U-3008	U-3008	captured World War II U-boat, used for publicity and testing purposes
X-1	Trieste II	Later DSV-1

== See also ==
- Submarines in the United States Navy
- List of current ships of the United States Navy
- List of lost United States submarines
- List of most successful American submarines in World War II
- Allied submarines in the Pacific War
- List of pre-Holland submarines
- List of submarine classes of the United States Navy
  - List of Gato class submarines
  - List of Sturgeon class submarines
  - List of Balao class submarines
  - List of Tench class submarines
  - List of Los Angeles class submarines
- List of submarines of World War II
- List of United States Navy ships
- List of United States Navy losses in World War II § Submarines (SS) - abbreviated list
- List of U.S. Navy ships sunk or damaged in action during World War II § Submarine (SS) - detailed list
- The NR-1 Deep Submergence Craft was a non-commissioned nuclear submarine operated by the United States Navy.
- Turtle, an American submarine of the American Revolutionary War
- H. L. Hunley, a human-powered submarine of the American Civil War in the early 1860s, operated by the Confederate States Army.
- The United States Navy operated several captured U-boats for publicity and testing purposes. Some were commissioned into the Navy.
- Naval Submarine Medical Research Laboratory
