= Tarpon (disambiguation) =

The tarpon is a species of a large, herring-like fish of the genus Megalops.

Tarpon may also refer to:

- Tarpon, Virginia, a community in the United States
- Grumman Tarpon or Grumman TBF Avenger, a torpedo bomber
- HMS Tarpon (1917), a destroyer
- HMS Tarpon (N17), a submarine launched in 1939
- USS Tarpon (SS-14) or USS C-3, a C-class submarine
- USS Tarpon (SS-175), a Porpoise-class submarine that served during World War II
- Rambler Tarpon, a 1963 concept car from the American Motors Corporation (AMC)

== See also ==
- Atlantic tarpon, a subspecies of tarpon (Megalops atlanticus)
- HMS Tarpon, a list of ships of the British Royal Navy
- Indo-Pacific tarpon, a subspecies of tarpon (Megalops cyprinoides)
- Tarpan
- USS Tarpon, a list of United States Navy ships
- Tarpon Springs, Florida
- Tarpon River, a river in Florida
- Lake Tarpon, a lake in Florida
