= USS Tarpon =

Two submarines of the United States Navy have been named USS Tarpon for the tarpon, a large, herring-like fish found abundantly in the Gulf of Mexico and the Caribbean Sea.

- The first Tarpon (Submarine No. 14) was a C-class submarine that was renamed C-3.
- The second USS Tarpon (SS-175) was a Porpoise-class submarine that served during World War II.
