= SS13 =

SS13 may refer to:

- Space Station 13, a video game
- Pitsea (Postcode district SS13), a town in Essex, England
- USS C-2 (SS-13), one of five C-class submarines built for the US Navy
