= SS9 =

SS9 may refer to:

- SS-9 Scarp, a Soviet intercontinental ballistic missile
- China Railways SS9, an electric locomotive
- USS C-1 (SS-9), a submarine of the United States Navy
- Energica Eva EsseEsse9, an electric motorcycle
