= Tarpan (disambiguation) =

Tarpan (Equus ferus ferus) is an extinct Eurasian wild horse.

Tarpan may also refer to:

== Equine animals ==
- Historically, wild horse (Equus ferus)
- Historically, any horse sharing the grullo color of Equus ferus ferus
- Heck horse, a breed of domestic horses selected to resemble Equus ferus ferus

== Transportation ==
- Tarpan Honker, a kind of vehicle
- FSR Tarpan, a Polish light truck manufacturer
- PZL M-4 Tarpan, an aircraft
- ST Tarpan, a tugboat
- Ukrainian Railways high speed interregional train ЕКр1, built by KVBZ.

== Other ==
- Tarpan (film), a 1994 Indian film starring Om Puri and Revathy
- Tarpan (TV series), an Indian TV series
- Tarpana or Tarpan, a term in the Vedic practice which refers to an offering made to divine entities

== See also ==
- Tarpon (disambiguation)
