= USS C-5 =

C-class submarine of the United States

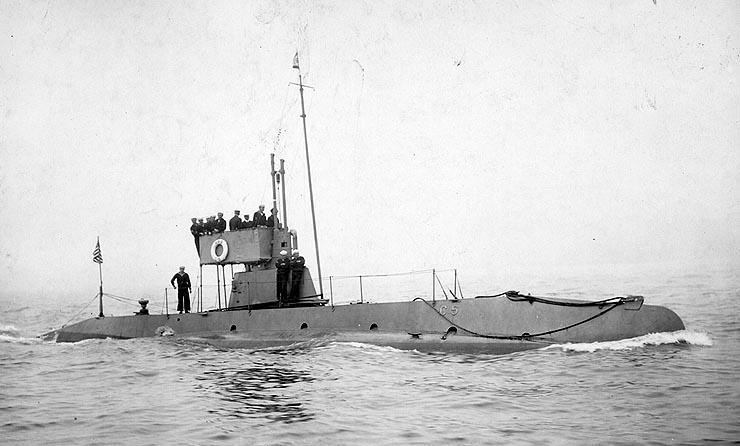
- USS C-5, ex-Snapper, underway in New York Harbor, during Naval Review in October 1912

History

United States
- Name: Snapper
- Namesake: The snapper fish
- Builder: Fore River Shipbuilding Company, Quincy, Massachusetts
- Cost: $344,142.36 (hull and machinery)
- Laid down: 17 March 1908
- Launched: 16 June 1909
- Sponsored by: Miss A. Nicoll
- Commissioned: 2 February 1910
- Decommissioned: 23 December 1919
- Renamed: C-5 (Submarine No.16), 17 November 1911
- Stricken: 23 December 1919
- Identification: Hull symbol: SS-16 (17 July 1920); Call sign: NSR
- Fate: Sold for scrapping, 13 April 1920

General characteristics
- Class & type: C-class submarine
- Displacement: 238 long tons (242 t) surfaced; 275 long tons (279 t) submerged
- Length: 105 ft 4 in (32.11 m)
- Beam: 13 ft 11 in (4.24 m)
- Draft: 10 ft 11 in (3.33 m)
- Installed power: 480 bhp (360 kW) (gasoline); 230 hp (170 kW) (electric)
- Propulsion: 2 × Craig Shipbuilding Company gasoline engine; 2 × Electro Dynamic electric motor; 2 × 60-cell battery; 2 × shaft
- Speed: 11 kn (20 km/h; 13 mph) surfaced; 9 kn (17 km/h; 10 mph) submerged
- Range: 776 nmi (1,437 km; 893 mi) at 8.13 kn (15.06 km/h; 9.36 mph) on the surface; 24 nmi (44 km; 28 mi) at 8 kn (15 km/h; 9.2 mph) submerged
- Test depth: 200 feet (61.0 m)
- Complement: 1 officer; 14 enlisted
- Armament: 2 × 18-inch (450 mm) bow torpedo tubes (4 torpedoes)

USS C-5 (SS-16), also known as "Submarine No. 16", was one of five C-class submarines built for the United States Navy in the first decade of the 20th century. She was the first boat in the USN named for the snapper.

== Design ==
The C-class submarines were enlarged versions of the preceding B class; they were the first American submarines with two propeller shafts. They had a length of 105 ft 3 in (32.08 m) overall, a beam of 13 ft 10 in (4.22 m) and a mean draft of 10 ft 10 in (3.30 m). They displaced 238 long tons (242 t) on the surface and 275 long tons (279 t) submerged. They had a diving depth of 200 ft (61.0 m). The C-class boats had a crew of 1 officer and 14 enlisted men.

For surface running, they were powered by two 240-brake-horsepower (179 kW) Craig gasoline engines, each driving one propeller shaft. When submerged each propeller was driven by a 115-horsepower (86 kW) electric motor. They could reach 11 kn (20 km/h; 13 mph) on the surface and 9 kn (17 km/h; 10 mph) underwater. On the surface, the boats had a range of 776 nmi (1,437 km; 893 mi) at 8.13 kn (15.06 km/h; 9.36 mph) and 24 nmi (44 km; 28 mi) at 8 kn (15 km/h; 9.2 mph) submerged.

The boats were armed with two 18-inch (450 mm) torpedo tubes in the bow. They carried two reloads, for a total of four torpedoes.

== Construction ==
Snapper was laid down on 17 March 1908, by Fore River Shipbuilding Company, in Quincy, Massachusetts, under a subcontract from Electric Boat Company. Snapper was launched on 16 June 1909, sponsored by Ms. A. Nicoll, and commissioned on 2 February 1910, with Ensign Chester W. Nimitz in command.

== Service history ==
Snapper was fitted out at the Boston Navy Yard, then began three years of training and tests along the East Coast and in Chesapeake Bay. She ran experiments with radio, submarine signalling apparatus, different types of batteries, and other equipment, all of which has since become standard in submarines. She joined in Fleet maneuvers helping to develop submarine tactics in submerged attacks on combatant ships, and engaged in operations with airplanes in the infancy of naval aviation. Highlights of the period were the Naval Reviews of the Fleet by President William H. Taft and Secretary of the Navy George von L. Meyer, in November 1911 and October 1912. She was renamed C-5 on 17 November 1911.

On 20 May 1913, C-5 and her sister ships of the First Group, Submarine Flotilla, Atlantic Fleet, commanded by Lieutenant (junior grade) R. S. Edwards in C-3, departed Norfolk, Virginia, in tow of submarine tender Castine and collier Mars, for Guantánamo Bay, Cuba. From her arrival on 29 May, C-5 exercised in Cuban waters, principally conducting torpedo drills, until 7 December 1913. On that date, C-5 and her sisters of the redesignated First Division, escorted by four surface ships, sailed for Cristóbal, Colón, Panama Canal Zone. Five days later the ships completed the 700 mi (1,100 km) passage, at that time the longest cruise made by United States submarines under their own power.

C-5 operated in Panamanian waters, conducting exercises and harbor defense patrols as well as studying the suitability of various ports of Panama for submarine bases.

== Fate ==
C-5 was decommissioned at Coco Solo, in the Panama Canal Zone, on 23 December 1919, and sold on 13 April 1920.

Fleet Admiral Chester Nimitz wrote of C-5:

Her Craig gasoline engines were built in Jersey City, by James Craig, an extraordinarily wise and capable builder. Craig was a self-taught engineer who began as a draftsman in the Machinery Division of the New York Navy Yard and who started his "Machine and Engine Works" in Jersey City, at a later date. C-5's engines were excellent as were also the Craig diesel engines he built for a subsequent submarine. These engines were designed and built by Craig and I have never forgotten his Foreword to the pamphlet of Operating Instructions which read briefly somewhat like this:

No matter what the designer and the builder may have planned for these engines and no matter what the operator may try to do with them the Laws of Nature will prevail in the End.

How True !!

== Bibliography ==
- "Table 21 - Ships on Navy List June 30, 1919". Congressional Serial Set. U.S. Government Printing Office: 764. 1921.
- Priolo, Gary. "Snapper / C-5 (SS-16)". Navsource.net.
- Friedman, Norman (1995). U.S. Submarines Through 1945: An Illustrated Design History. Annapolis, Maryland: Naval Institute Press. ISBN 1-55750-263-3.
- Gardiner, Robert & Gray, Randal, eds. (1985). Conway's All the World's Fighting Ships 1906–1921. Annapolis, Maryland: Naval Institute Press. ISBN 0-85177-245-5.
- "C-5 (Submarine Torpedo Boat No. 16)". Dictionary of American Naval Fighting Ships. Navy Department, Naval History and Heritage Command. 20 August 2024. This article incorporates text from this source, which is in the public domain.
