= Peter C. Assersen =

US Navy admiral (1839–1906)

- Born: January 5, 1839; Egersund, Rogaland, Norway
- Died: 1906 (aged 66–67); New London, Connecticut
- Burial place: Naval Academy in Annapolis
- Military career
- Allegiance: United States
- Branch: United States Navy
- Service years: 1862–1869; 1872–1901
- Rank: Rear Admiral
- Conflicts: American Civil War

Peter Christian Assersen (January 5, 1839 – December 6, 1906) was a civil engineer and Rear Admiral in the United States Navy. His parents were Asser Johannessen and Malene Rasmusdatter. He left Norway at age 17 as a cabin boy on a bark sailing from the port of Stavanger. He came to the United States in 1859 at age 20.

== Personal life ==
In August 1864 Assersen married Mary Ann Wilson from Brooklyn. She was born May 11, 1867, and died May 10, 1910. They had 7 children, 3 boys and 4 girls. His sons all served in the United States military:

- Henry Raymond Asserson (1867–?) served as a special engineer during the First World War on General Pershing's staff. He was retired with the rank Major.
- Frederick Asser Asserson (1878–1931) served in the medical corps in the United States Navy and was retired with the rank Commander.
- William Christian Asserson (1875–1939) served in the United States Navy. In 1901 he served in China in the Boxer Uprising. During World War I he commanded the USS Castine (PG-6), and for some months before the Armistice with Germany he served as chief of staff to the commander of the United States Patrol Squadron in the Mediterranean Sea, in the vicinity of Gibraltar. He retired with the rank of captain. He was awarded the Navy Cross for his efforts in World War I.

== Other sources ==
- Ulvestad, Martin (1907) Nordmændene i Amerika deres Historie og Rekord (Minneapolis, Minnesota. 1st volume)
- Bjork, Kenneth (1947) Saga in Steel and Concrete (Northfield, Minnesota: Norwegian-American Historical Association. Chapter 9, Pg. 335-338)
- Rygg, Andreas Nilsen (1941) Norwegians in New York (Brooklyn NY: The Norwegian News Company, p. 50)
- Bergmann, Leola Nelson (1950) Americans from Norway (Philadelphia, Pennsylvania: J.B.Lippincott Co. p. 216)
