= USS Castine (PG-6) =

Gunboat of the United States Navy

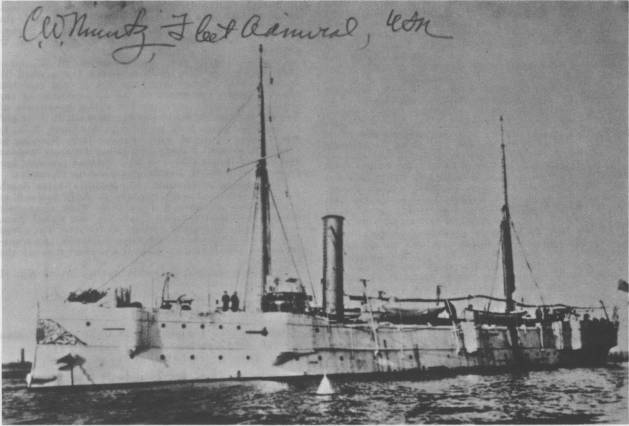
- USS Castine

History

United States
- Name: Castine
- Namesake: Castine, Maine
- Builder: Bath Iron Works
- Launched: 11 May 1892
- Sponsored by: Ms. M. Hichborn
- Commissioned: 22 October 1894
- Decommissioned: 8 October 1901
- Recommissioned: 12 November 1903
- Decommissioned: 23 September 1905
- Recommissioned: 4 October 1908
- Decommissioned: 28 August 1919
- Fate: Sold 5 August 1921; Sunk by internal explosion 12 December 1924

General characteristics
- Type: Gunboat
- Displacement: 1,177 long tons (1,196 t)
- Length: 204 ft (62 m)
- Beam: 32 ft 1 in (9.78 m)
- Draft: 12 ft (3.7 m)
- Complement: 154 officers and enlisted
- Armament: 8 × 4 in (100 mm) guns; 4 × 6-pounder (57 mm (2.24 in)) guns

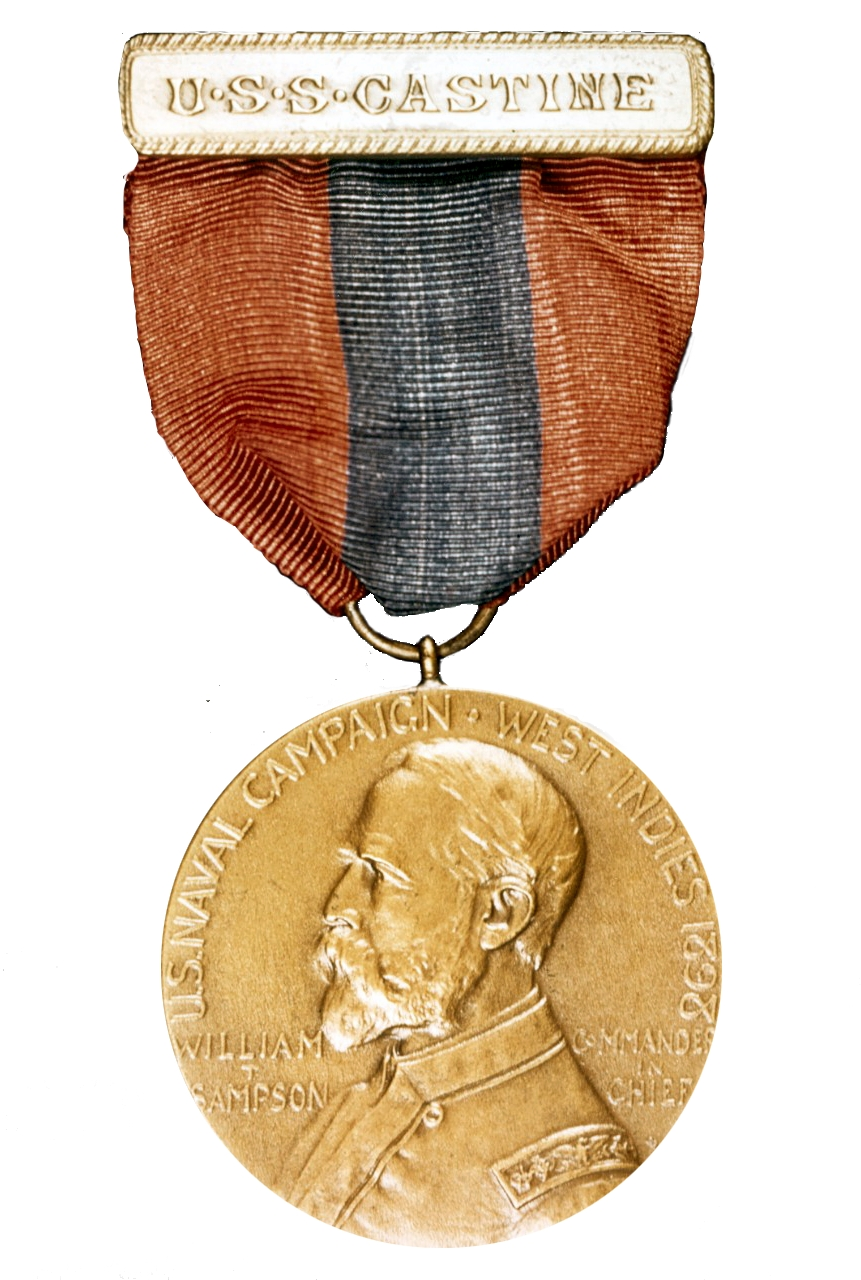
Sampson Medal from the USS Castine

USS Castine (PG-6) was a gunboat of the United States Navy in commission from 1894 to 1901, from 1903 to 1905, and from 1908 to 1919. The first U.S. Navy ship named for Castine, Maine, she saw service during the Spanish–American War, the Philippine–American War, and World War I.

== Construction and commissioning ==
Castine was launched on 11 May 1892 by Bath Iron Works in Bath, Maine, sponsored by Ms. M. Hichborn. She was commissioned on 22 October 1894 with Commander Thomas Perry in command, and reported to the United States Atlantic Fleet.

== Service history ==
=== Pre-Spanish American War ===
Assigned to the South Atlantic Ocean, Castine cleared New England waters in February 1895. She called at the Azores and Gibraltar, passed through the Suez Canal, visited Zanzibar and Mozambique, and rounded the Cape of Good Hope before arriving on station at Pernambuco, Brazil, on 13 October 1895. She cruised in South American and West Indian waters – save for an overhaul period in Norfolk, Virginia – until March 1898.

=== Spanish–American War ===
As American relations with Spain deteriorated just prior to the April 1898 outbreak of the Spanish–American War, Castine was called north in March 1898 to take her place on the blockade surrounding Cuba. She served in the force which accompanied the United States Army's troop transports to Cuba, and remained in the Caribbean through the close of the war in August 1898.

=== Pre-World War I ===
In December 1898, Castine sailed from Boston, Massachusetts, for the Suez Canal on her way to East Asia. Upon her arrival in the Philippine Islands, she began duty in coordination with the U.S. Army to combat Philippine insurgent forces during the Philippine–American War. Operating primarily in the southern islands, she supervised the post-Spanish–American War evacuation of the Spanish garrison at Zamboanga in May 1899. With a cruise to Chinese ports in 1900, Castine remained in East Asian waters until June 1901, when she cleared for the Suez Canal and the United States East Coast. She was decommissioned at Philadelphia, Pennsylvania, on 8 October 1901.

Castine remained at Philadelphia until recommissioning on 12 November 1903. Upon recommissioning, she saw duty in the South Atlantic, Mediterranean Sea, and Caribbean.

On 20 April 1904, Captain Edward John Dorn took command of the ship.

On 23 September 1905, she was decommissioned at Portsmouth Navy Yard in Kittery, Maine.

Castine remained at Portsmouth Navy Yard until 4 October 1908, when she recommissioned to serve as a submarine tender at U.S. East Coast naval bases until May 1913. On 11 July 1910 She was beached near North Truro, Massachusetts after a collision with USS Bonita. Later refloated, repaired and returned to service. She then returned to the Caribbean for gunboat duty, and later cruised off Vera Cruz and Tampico, Mexico.

==== Near-loss in Santo Domingo harbor, 29 August 1916 ====
Castine was at anchor in the harbor of Santo Domingo along with the armored cruiser Memphis on 29 August 1916 when, shortly after 12:00, an unexpected heavy swell began to develop and the ships began to roll heavily. Castine and Memphis both made preparations to leave the harbor and began to raise steam; Memphis expected to be able to get underway at about 16:35, with the smaller Castine able to do so earlier.

Conditions in the harbor had deteriorated badly by 15:45, when the ships sighted an approaching 75 ft (23 m) wave of yellow water stretching along the entire horizon. By 16:00, the wave was closer, had turned ochre in color, and had reached about 100 ft (30 m) in height; at the same time, the ships began to roll very heavily, with Memphis rolling 45°. Around 16:40, the giant wave the ships had seen approaching over the past hour arrived; it turned out to be a set of three waves of up to 70 ft (21 m) in height striking in rapid succession. Castine had gotten underway under minimal power and managed to put to sea through the huge waves, although she suffered damage and nearly capsized. Memphis, still immobile, was battered into a complete wreck, and a group of her sailors returning from shore leave in a motor launch were caught in the harbor by the waves and swamped; Memphis suffered 40 killed and 204 badly injured.

In his 1966 account of the incident, The Wreck of the Memphis, Captain Edward L. Beach, Jr., son of Memphis's commanding officer Captain Edward L. Beach, Sr., described the heroic efforts of Castine to assist crewmen of Memphis who had been swamped in the motor launch. He also ascribed the events in the harbor to an unexpected tsunami exceeding 100 ft (30 m) in height, and this explanation has been carried forward by most sources discussing the incident. More recent research, however, has called this explanation into question. No record of any seismic event in the Caribbean on 29 August 1916 that could have triggered a tsunami has been found, and the rate of advance of the large wave Castine and Memphis reported—about an hour to cross the distance from the horizon to the ships—matches that of a wind-generated ocean wave (possibly a rogue wave); a tsunami, in contrast, would have covered the distance in only a few minutes. The periods of the three large waves that struck Castine and Memphis also are characteristic of large wind-generated waves rather than tsunamis.

A likely source for such large, wind-generated waves in Santo Domingo Harbor on 29 August 1916 does exist, in that three hurricanes active in the Caribbean between 12 August and 2 September 1916, (the first struck Corpus Christi, Texas, on 18 August 1916) passed westward just to the south. Waves generated by these storms could well have combined to create large waves like those that struck Castine and Memphis. Such a circumstance appears to explain the waves better than the tsunami theory. Oceanographer Dr. George Pararas-Carayammis in particular published an extensively detailed rebuttal demonstrating that a tsunami could not have caused the near-loss of Castine and foundering of Memphis, but that the last of the three hurricanes, a category 2 hurricane, likely did, creating a 59 ft (18 m) wave that reached a breaker height of 90 ft (27 m) as it approached Memphis.

=== World War I ===
The United States entered World War I on 6 April 1917, and Castine's time in the Caribbean ended in July 1917. On 5 August, she sailed to join the Patrol Force at Gibraltar, where she served until 21 December 1918, when she returned to the United States. The Navy Cross was awarded to the son of Rear Admiral Peter C. Assersen, Captain William Christian Asserson (21 August 1875 – 8 July 1939), for distinguished service as commanding officer of Castine while "engaged in the exacting and hazardous duty of transporting troops and supplies to European ports through waters infested with enemy submarines and naval mines" during World War I.

== Decommissioning and disposal ==
Castine was decommissioned at New Orleans, Louisiana, on 28 August 1919 and sold on 5 August 1921 for $12,500.00; she was resold for $40,000.00 in 1923. On 12 December 1924, she was under tow to Texas, where she was to be scrapped, when an explosion aboard her caused her to sink in 20 minutes.

== Wreck ==
The wreck of Castine was identified by Thales Geosolutions in 2001 as a modern ship in 105 feet (32 meters) of sea water. Her wreck was documented further in May 2005 when a team from the United States Minerals Management Service (MMS) was identifying sonar targets. The site was re-examined by the MMS to evaluate damage following August 2005's Hurricane Katrina; the team found that even though Castine's wreck was within 30 miles of the eye, very little damage occurred. In March 2009, the site was officially added to the National Register of Historic Places.
