= Tarpon, Virginia =

Unincorporated community in Virginia, United States

Coordinates: 37°11′09″N 82°21′05″W

Tarpon is an unincorporated community in Dickenson County, Virginia, United States.

== History ==
Tarpon contained a post office from 1876 until 1961. Pine tar on a nearby pond gave the community its name.
