= USS D-3 =

D-class submarine of the United States

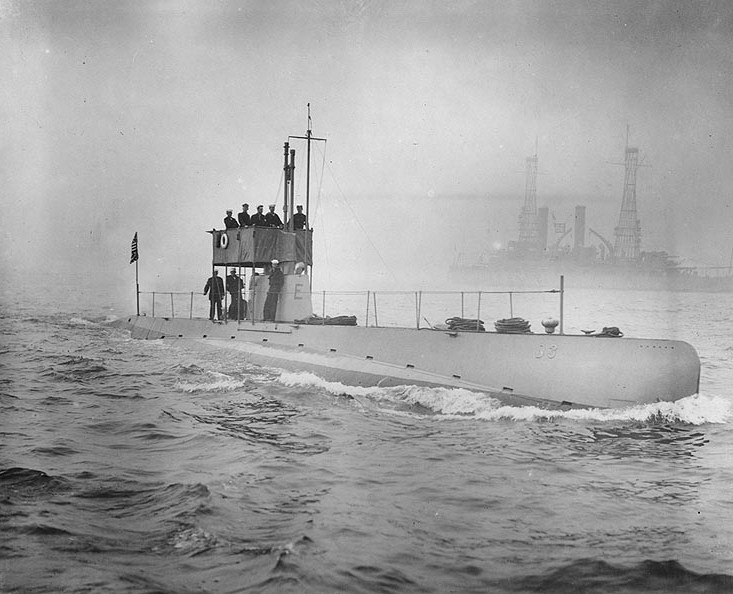
- USS D-3, ex-Salmon, underway off New York City, during the October 1912 Naval Review, USS Kearsarge is in the background

History

United States
- Name: Salmon
- Namesake: The salmon
- Builder: Fore River Shipbuilding Company, Quincy, Massachusetts
- Cost: $380,318.81 (hull and machinery)
- Laid down: 16 April 1908
- Launched: 12 March 1910
- Sponsored by: Miss Eunice Fitzgerald
- Commissioned: 8 September 1910
- Decommissioned: 31 July 1922
- Renamed: D-3 (Submarine No.19), 17 November 1911
- Stricken: 31 July 1922
- Identification: Hull symbol: SS-19 (17 July 1920); Call sign: NSA
- Fate: Sold for scrapping, 31 July 1922

General characteristics
- Class & type: D-class submarine
- Displacement: 288 long tons (293 t) surfaced; 337 long tons (342 t) submerged
- Length: 134 ft 10 in (41.10 m)
- Beam: 13 ft 11 in (4.24 m)
- Draft: 12 ft 6 in (3.81 m)
- Installed power: 600 bhp (450 kW) (gasoline); 330 hp (250 kW) (electric)
- Propulsion: 2 × Craig Shipbuilding Company gasoline engine; 2 × Electro Dynamic electric motors, 2 × 60-Cell batteries; 2 × Propeller
- Speed: 13 kn (24 km/h; 15 mph) surfaced; 9.5 kn (17.6 km/h; 10.9 mph) submerged
- Range: 1,179 nmi (2,184 km; 1,357 mi) at 9.3 knots (17.2 km/h; 10.7 mph) surfaced; 24 nmi (44 km; 28 mi) at 8 kn (15 km/h; 9.2 mph) submerged
- Test depth: 200 feet (61.0 m)
- Complement: 1 officer; 14 enlisted
- Armament: 4 × 18 inch (450 mm) bow torpedo tubes (4 torpedoes)

USS Salmon/D-3 (SS-19), also known as "Submarine No. 19", was a D-class submarine built for the United States Navy (USN) in the first decade of the 20th century. She was the first ship of the United States Navy to be named after the salmon. She was the first submarine to make an over ocean voyage under her own power.

== Design ==
The D-class submarines were enlarged versions of the preceding C class, the first American submarines armed with four torpedo tubes. They had a length of 134 ft 10 in (41.10 m) overall, a beam of 13 ft 10 in (4.22 m) and a mean draft of 12 ft 6 in (3.81 m). They displaced 288 long tons (293 t) on the surface and 337 long tons (342 t) submerged. The D-class boats had a crew of 1 officer and 14 enlisted men. They had a diving depth of 200 ft (61 m).

For surface running, they were powered by two 300-brake-horsepower (224 kW) gasoline engines, each driving one propeller shaft. When submerged each propeller was driven by a 165-horsepower (123 kW) electric motor. They could reach 13 kn (24 km/h; 15 mph) on the surface and 9.5 kn (17.6 km/h; 10.9 mph) underwater. On the surface, the boats had a range of 1,179 nmi (2,184 km; 1,357 mi) at 9.6 kn (17.8 km/h; 11.0 mph) and 24 nmi (44 km; 28 mi) at 8 kn (15 km/h; 9.2 mph) submerged.

The boats were armed with four 18-inch (450 mm) torpedo tubes in the bow. They did not carry reloads for them.

== Construction ==
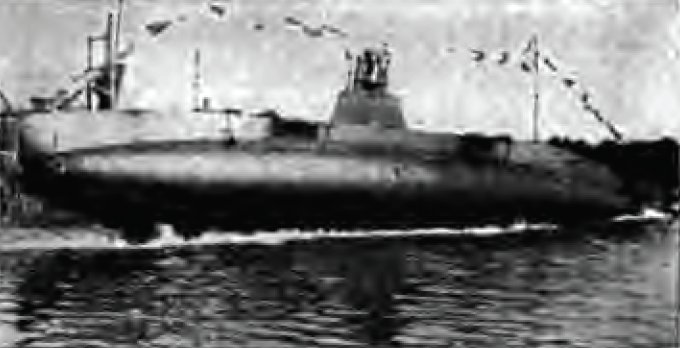
USS Salmon being launched in 1910

Salmon was laid down by Fore River Shipbuilding Company, in Quincy, Massachusetts, under a subcontract from Electric Boat Company of Groton, Connecticut. Salmon was launched on 12 March 1910, sponsored by Eunice Fitzgerald, the daughter of Boston Mayor John F. Fitzgerald.

In July 1910, captained by Electric Boat Company executive, and former naval officer, Gregory C. Davison, she journeyed from Massachusetts to Bermuda, and returned. Travelling about 1,500 nmi (2,800 km; 1,700 mi), it was the first over-sea trip made by a submarine under its own power.

== Service history ==
Salmon was commissioned on 8 September 1910, and joined the Atlantic Torpedo Fleet at Newport, Rhode Island. She was renamed D-3 on 17 November 1911. The torpedo fleet was active along the East Coast and made a cruise to the Caribbean Sea, from 17 October 1912 – 20 January 1913, after which D-3 remained to serve with the forces operating in Mexican waters following the occupation of Veracruz. She rejoined the flotilla at Norfolk, Virginia, on 16 June 1914, and with them visited Washington, DC, from 17–22 July, before returning to their homeport on 24 July. From 21 September 1917, D-3 served as flagboat of Submarine Division 2 (SubDiv 2). She trained aspiring submariners at Newport and New London, Connecticut, until placed in commission, in reserve on 5 September 1919.

== Fate ==
She was placed in ordinary, on 15 July 1921. D-3 was towed into Philadelphia Navy Yard, on 20 March 1922, where she was decommissioned and her name struck from the navy list the same day. She was sold for scrapping on 31 July 1922.

== Bibliography ==
- "Table 21 - Ships on Navy List June 30, 1919". Congressional Serial Set. U.S. Government Printing Office: 764. 1921.
- Gary, Priolo. "Salmon / D-3 (SS-19)". Navsource.net.
- Cressman, Robert J. (12 May 2021). "Salmon I (Submarine No. 19)". Dictionary of American Naval Fighting Ships. Navy Department, Naval History and Heritage Command. This article incorporates text from this source, which is in the public domain.
- Friedman, Norman (1995). U.S. Submarines Through 1945: An Illustrated Design History. Annapolis, Maryland: Naval Institute Press. ISBN 1-55750-263-3.
- Gardiner, Robert & Gray, Randal, eds. (1985). Conway's All the World's Fighting Ships 1906–1921. Annapolis, Maryland: Naval Institute Press. ISBN 0-85177-245-5.
- "New Boat Christened". The Barre Daily Times. Barre, Vermont. 12 March 1910.
- "The Submarine Salmon". The Navy. 4. Navy Publishing Company: 15. March 1910.
- Marquis, Albert Nelson, ed. (1915). Who's who in New England: A Biographical Dictionary of Leading Living Men and Women of the States of Maine, New Hampshire, Vermont, Massachusetts, Rhode Island and Connecticut. A.N. Marquis & Company. p. 318.
- Day, Thomas Fleming, ed. (1910). "A Fifteen-Hundred Mile Voyage in a Submarine". The Rudder. 24. Fawcett Publications: 121–124.
