= USS C-4 =

C-class submarine of the United States

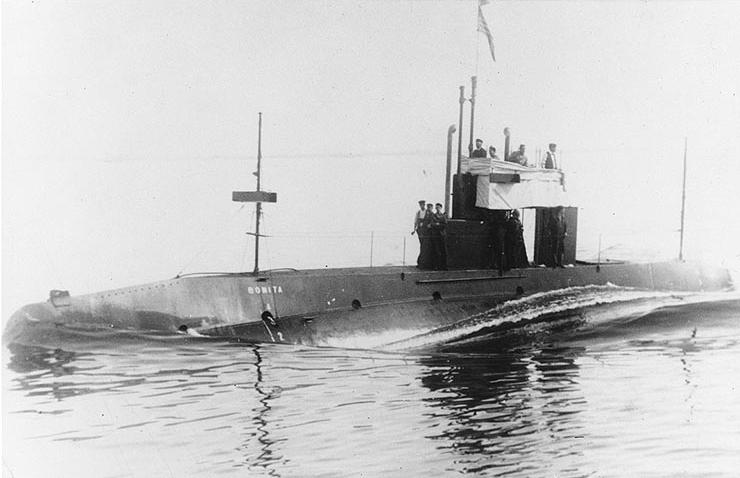
- USS Bonita underway, 1909

History

United States
- Name: Bonita
- Namesake: The bonito fish
- Builder: Fore River Shipbuilding Company, Quincy, Massachusetts
- Cost: $299,079.27 (hull and machinery)
- Laid down: 17 March 1908
- Launched: 17 June 1909
- Sponsored by: Mrs. J. C. Townsend
- Commissioned: 23 November 1909
- Decommissioned: 15 August 1919
- Renamed: C-4 (Submarine No.15), 17 November 1911
- Stricken: 15 August 1919
- Identification: Hull symbol: SS-15 (17 July 1920); Call sign: NCP
- Fate: Sold for scrapping, 13 April 1920

General characteristics
- Class & type: C-class submarine
- Displacement: 238 long tons (242 t) surfaced; 275 long tons (279 t) submerged
- Length: 105 ft 4 in (32.11 m)
- Beam: 13 ft 11 in (4.24 m)
- Draft: 10 ft 11 in (3.33 m)
- Installed power: 480 bhp (360 kW) (gasoline); 230 hp (170 kW) (electric)
- Propulsion: 2 × Craig Shipbuilding Company gasoline engine; 2 × Electro Dynamic electric motor; 2 × 60-cell battery; 2 × shaft
- Speed: 11 kn (20 km/h; 13 mph) surfaced; 9 kn (17 km/h; 10 mph) submerged
- Range: 776 nmi (1,437 km; 893 mi) at 8.13 kn (15.06 km/h; 9.36 mph) on the surface; 24 nmi (44 km; 28 mi) at 8 kn (15 km/h; 9.2 mph) submerged
- Test depth: 200 feet (61.0 m)
- Complement: 1 officer; 14 enlisted
- Armament: 2 × 18-inch (450 mm) bow torpedo tubes (4 torpedoes)

USS Bonita/C-4 (SS-15), also known as "Submarine No. 15", one of five C-class submarines built for the United States Navy in the first decade of the 20th century. A misspelling of bonito, she was the first boat in the USN named for the bonito fish.

== Design ==
The C-class submarines were enlarged versions of the preceding B class; they were the first American submarines with two propeller shafts. They had a length of 105 ft 3 in (32.08 m) overall, a beam of 13 ft 10 in (4.22 m) and a mean draft of 10 ft 10 in (3.30 m). They displaced 238 long tons (242 t) on the surface and 275 long tons (279 t) submerged. They had a diving depth of 200 ft (61.0 m). The C-class boats had a crew of 1 officer and 14 enlisted men.

For surface running, they were powered by two 240-brake-horsepower (179 kW) Craig gasoline engines, each driving one propeller shaft. When submerged each propeller was driven by a 115-horsepower (86 kW) electric motor. They could reach 11 kn (20 km/h; 13 mph) on the surface and 9 kn (17 km/h; 10 mph) underwater. On the surface, the boats had a range of 776 nmi (1,437 km; 893 mi) at 8.13 kn (15.06 km/h; 9.36 mph) and 24 nmi (44 km; 28 mi) at 8 kn (15 km/h; 9.2 mph) submerged.

The boats were armed with two 18-inch (450 mm) torpedo tubes in the bow. They carried two reloads, for a total of four torpedoes.

== Construction ==
Bonita was laid down by Fore River Shipbuilding Company, in Quincy, Massachusetts, under a subcontract from Electric Boat Company. She was launched on 17 June 1909, sponsored by Mrs. J. C. Townsend, and commissioned on 23 November 1909.

== Service history ==
On 11 July 1910, Bonita collided with the Submarine tender Castine while practicing attack maneuvers, Castine was beached near North Truro, Massachusetts. Castine was later refloated, repaired and returned to service.

She was renamed C-4, on 17 November 1911. Assigned first to the Atlantic Torpedo Fleet, and later to the Atlantic Submarine Flotilla, Atlantic Fleet, C-4 plied East Coast waters until May 1913, when she cleared Norfolk, Virginia, for Guantánamo Bay, Cuba. Her tactical exercises and development operations continued here and from Cristóbal, Colón, Panama Canal Zone, where she reported on 12 December 1913. In August 1917, sailing with two other submarines, she explored the suitability of Panamanian ports as advance submarine bases.

== Fate ==
Laid up at Coco Solo, Canal Zone, from 12 November 1918, C-4 was decommissioned there on 15 August 1919, and sold on 13 April 1920.

== Bibliography ==
- "Table 21 - Ships on Navy List June 30, 1919". Congressional Serial Set. U.S. Government Printing Office: 764. 1921.
- Priolo, Gary. "Bonita / C-4 (SS-15)". Navsource.net.
- Friedman, Norman (1995). U.S. Submarines Through 1945: An Illustrated Design History. Annapolis, Maryland: Naval Institute Press. ISBN 1-55750-263-3.
- Gardiner, Robert & Gray, Randal, eds. (1985). Conway's All the World's Fighting Ships 1906–1921. Annapolis, Maryland: Naval Institute Press. ISBN 0-85177-245-5.
- "C-4". Dictionary of American Naval Fighting Ships. Navy Department, Naval History and Heritage Command. This article incorporates text from this source, which is in the public domain.
- "Records of the T. A. Scott co". mysticseaport.org. Archived from the original on 16 April 2021.
