= USS C-1 =

C-class submarine of the United States

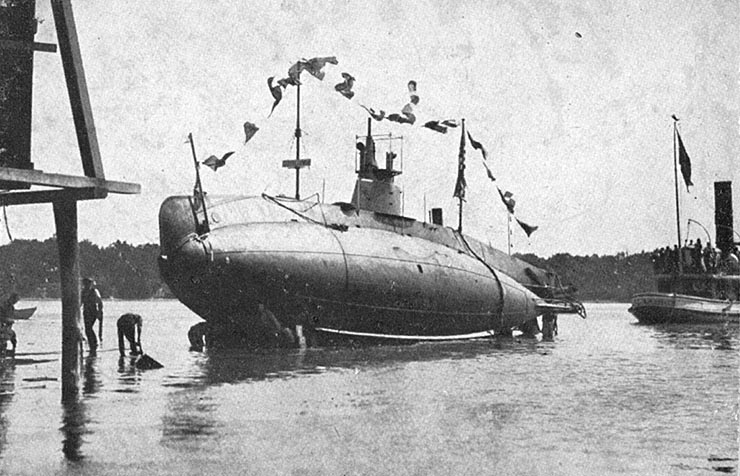
- Launching of USS Octopus, at the Fore River Shipbuilding Company, Quincy, Massachusetts, 4 October 1906

History

United States
- Name: Octopus
- Namesake: The octopus
- Builder: Fore River Shipbuilding Company, Quincy, Massachusetts
- Cost: $253,119.81 (hull and machinery)
- Laid down: 3 August 1905
- Launched: 4 October 1906
- Sponsored by: Miss F. Webster
- Commissioned: 30 June 1908
- Decommissioned: 14 February 1910
- Recommissioned: 15 April 1910
- Decommissioned: 4 August 1919
- Renamed: C-1 (Submarine No.9), 17 November 1911
- Identification: Hull symbol: SS-9 (17 July 1920); Call sign: NMV
- Fate: Sold for scrapping, 13 April 1920

General characteristics
- Class & type: C-class submarine
- Displacement: 238 long tons (242 t) surfaced; 275 long tons (279 t) submerged
- Length: 105 ft 4 in (32.11 m)
- Beam: 13 ft 11 in (4.24 m)
- Draft: 10 ft 11 in (3.33 m)
- Installed power: 480 bhp (360 kW) (gasoline); 230 hp (170 kW) (electric)
- Propulsion: 2 × Craig Shipbuilding Company gasoline engine; 2 × Electro Dynamic electric motor; 2 × 60-cell battery; 2 × shaft
- Speed: 11 kn (20 km/h; 13 mph) surfaced; 9 kn (17 km/h; 10 mph) submerged
- Range: 776 nmi (1,437 km; 893 mi) at 8.13 kn (15.06 km/h; 9.36 mph) on the surface; 24 nmi (44 km; 28 mi) at 8 kn (15 km/h; 9.2 mph) submerged
- Test depth: 200 feet (61.0 m)
- Complement: 1 officer; 14 enlisted
- Armament: 2 × 18-inch (450 mm) bow torpedo tubes (4 torpedoes)

USS Octopus/C-1 (SS-9), also known as "Submarine No. 9", was the lead ship of her class of submarines built for the United States Navy in the first decade of the 20th century. As of October 2025, she has been the only boat in the USN named for the octopus.

== Design ==
The C-class submarines were enlarged versions of the preceding B class; they were the first American submarines with two propeller shafts. They had a length of 105 ft 3 in (32.08 m) overall, a beam of 13 ft 10 in (4.22 m) and a mean draft of 10 ft 10 in (3.30 m). They displaced 238 long tons (242 t) on the surface and 275 long tons (279 t) submerged. They had a diving depth of 200 ft (61.0 m). The C-class boats had a crew of 1 officer and 14 enlisted men.

For surface running, they were powered by two 240-brake-horsepower (179 kW) Craig gasoline engines, each driving one propeller shaft. When submerged each propeller was driven by a 115-horsepower (86 kW) electric motor. They could reach 11 kn (20 km/h; 13 mph) on the surface and 9 kn (17 km/h; 10 mph) underwater. On the surface, the boats had a range of 776 nmi (1,437 km; 893 mi) at 8.13 kn (15.06 km/h; 9.36 mph) and 24 nmi (44 km; 28 mi) at 8 kn (15 km/h; 9.2 mph) submerged.

The boats were armed with two 18-inch (450 mm) torpedo tubes in the bow. They carried two reloads, for a total of four torpedoes.

== Construction ==
Octopus was laid down, on 3 August 1905, by Fore River Shipbuilding Company, in Quincy, Massachusetts, under a subcontract from Electric Boat Company. Octopus was launched on 4 October 1906, sponsored by Miss F. Webster, and commissioned on 30 June 1908.

== Service history ==
Assigned to Submarine Flotilla 2 (SubFlot 2), Octopus operated out of Newport, Rhode Island, and New York City, until 9 October 1908. Tests and experiments, of both submarine design and the tactical use of her type, continued from Norfolk, Virginia, and Newport, until she was placed in reserve at Charleston, South Carolina, on 14 February 1910.

Octopus was recommissioned on 15 April 1910, the submarine conducted experiments and served as training vessel at Newport, until 10 May 1913. She was renamed C-1, on 17 November 1911. C-1 was reassigned to Submarine Group 1, Torpedo Flotilla, Atlantic Fleet, and from 29 May – 7 December 1913, she operated out of Guantánamo Bay, Cuba. She served in Panamanian waters in training, and later, on patrol during World War I until August 1919.

== Fate ==
C-1 was decommissioned on 4 August 1919, at Coco Solo, in the Panama Canal Zone. Here, she was sold on 13 April 1920.

== Bibliography ==
- "Table 21 - Ships on Navy List June 30, 1919". Congressional Serial Set. U.S. Government Printing Office: 764. 1921.
- Mohl, Michael. "Octopus / C-1 (SS-9)". Navsource.net.
- Friedman, Norman (1995). U.S. Submarines Through 1945: An Illustrated Design History. Annapolis, Maryland: Naval Institute Press. ISBN 1-55750-263-3.
- Gardiner, Robert & Gray, Randal, eds. (1985). Conway's All the World's Fighting Ships 1906–1921. Annapolis, Maryland: Naval Institute Press. ISBN 0-85177-245-5.
- "C-1 (Submarine No. 9)". Dictionary of American Naval Fighting Ships. Navy Department, Naval History and Heritage Command. 19 August 2024. This article incorporates text from this source, which is in the public domain.
