= United States C-class submarine =

United States Navy submarine class

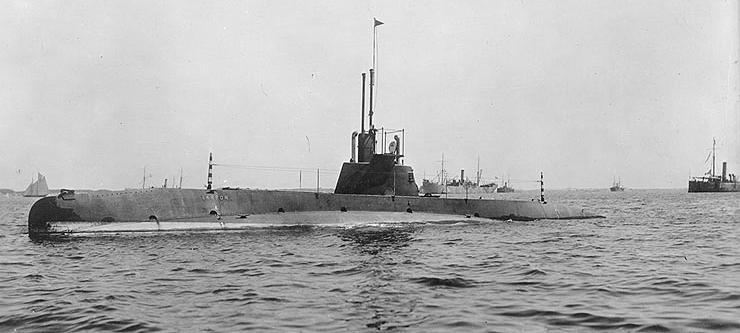
- USS Tarpon, 1909

Class overview
- Builders: Electric Boat (design); Fore River Shipyard, Quincy, Massachusetts
- Operators: United States Navy
- Preceded by: B class
- Succeeded by: D class
- Built: 1906–1909
- In commission: 1908–1919
- Completed: 5
- Retired: 5

General characteristics
- Type: Submarine
- Displacement: 238 long tons (242 t) surfaced; 275 long tons (279 t) submerged
- Length: 105 ft 4 in (32.11 m)
- Beam: 13 ft 11 in (4.24 m)
- Draft: 10 ft 7 in (3.23 m)
- Installed power: 500 horsepower (370 kW) surfaced; 300 hp (220 kW) submerged
- Propulsion: 2 × Craig Shipbuilding Company gasoline engine; 2 × Electro Dynamic electric motors, 2 × 60-Cell batteries; 2 × Propeller
- Speed: 10.5 kn (19.4 km/h; 12.1 mph) surfaced; 9 kn (17 km/h; 10 mph) submerged
- Range: 800 nmi (1,500 km; 920 mi) surfaced; 80 nmi (150 km; 92 mi) submerged
- Test depth: 200 ft (61 m)
- Complement: 1 officer; 14 enlisted
- Armament: 2 × 18 inch (450 mm) bow torpedo tubes (4 torpedoes)

The C-class submarines were five United States Navy submarines built by the Fore River Shipbuilding Company in Quincy, Massachusetts, under a subcontract from the Electric Boat Company. Built between 1906 and 1909, and in commission from 1908 to 1919, all five were subsequently sold for scrap in 1920. They were considerably larger than the preceding B-class at 275 long tons (279 t) submerged vs. 173 long tons (176 t) submerged, and were the first United States submarines with two-shaft propulsion, doubling the machinery of the B class.

== Design ==
The C-class boats were the first to be designed solely by Electric Boat's new chief designer Lawrence Spear. They were the first US Navy submarines to have two propellers, a design trend that would last until 1953. Electric Boat made the design available for export, and two boats (with rights for a third) were sold to the Austro-Hungarian Navy and commissioned as the U-5 class.

These vessels had features intended to increase underwater speed, including a small sail and a rotating cap over the torpedo tube muzzles. The streamlined, rotating torpedo tube muzzle cap eliminated the drag that muzzle holes would otherwise cause. In the stowed position, the submarine appears to have no torpedo tubes, as the holes in the cap are covered by the bow stem. With the exception of the L-class and the one-off M-1, this feature remained standard for submarines designed by the Electric Boat Company through the O-class, after which it was replaced with individual muzzle doors faired with shutters that remain standard through the modern day.

For extended surface runs, the small sail was augmented with a temporary piping-and-canvas structure. Tactical doctrine for harbor defense submarines dictated that quick "crash dives" would not be necessary, thus the considerable time it took to dismantle this structure and stow it below was not considered a liability. Experience in World War I showed that this was inadequate in the North Atlantic weather, and earlier submarines serving overseas in that war (E, K, and L-classes) had their bridge structures augmented with a "chariot" shield on the front of the bridge. Starting with the N-class, built with lessons learned from overseas experience, US submarines had bridges more suited to surfaced operations in rough weather.

== Service history ==
C-1, originally named Octopus, was built as a prototype by Electric Boat, for demonstration in a 1906 competition with Simon Lake's submarine Simon Lake XV. Octopus won the trials, and the Navy ordered four additional boats of the design. This accounts for the non-sequential hull numbers for the C-class.

The C-class submarines served in the Atlantic Fleet. On 20 May 1913, the five C-class boats of the First Group, Submarine Flotilla, Atlantic Fleet, departed Norfolk, Virginia, for Guantanamo Bay, Cuba. They exercised in Cuban waters, principally conducting torpedo exercises, until 7 December 1913. On that date the C-class boats, now of the redesignated First Division, escorted by four surface ships, sailed for Cristóbal, in the Panama Canal Zone. Five days later the ships completed the 700-mile (1,100 km) passage, at that time the longest cruise made by United States submarines under their own power. The submarines remained at the Coco Solo submarine base until they were decommissioned in 1919, and scrapped in 1920.

== Boats in class ==
The following ships of the class were constructed.

Construction data
Ship name	Hull class and no.	Builder	Laid down	Launched	Comm.	Decomm.	Renamed	Rename date	Reclass. hull no.	Reclass. hull no. date	Fate
Octopus	Submarine No. 9	Fore River Shipyard, Quincy, Massachusetts	3 August 1905	4 October 1906	30 June 1908	4 August 1919	C-1	17 November 1911	SS-9	17 July 1920	Sold for scrapping, 13 April 1920
Stingray	Submarine No. 13	Fore River Shipyard, Quincy, Massachusetts	4 March 1908	8 April 1909	23 November 1909	23 December 1919	C-2	17 November 1911	SS-13	17 July 1920	Sold for scrapping, 13 April 1920
Tarpon	Submarine No. 14	Fore River Shipyard, Quincy, Massachusetts	17 March 1908	8 April 1909	23 November 1909	23 December 1919	C-3	17 November 1911	SS-14	17 July 1920	Sold for scrapping, 13 April 1920
Bonita	Submarine No. 15	Fore River Shipyard, Quincy, Massachusetts	17 March 1908	17 June 1909	23 November 1909	15 August 1919	C-4	17 November 1911	SS-15	17 July 1920	Sold for scrapping, 13 April 1920
Snapper	Submarine No. 16	Fore River Shipyard, Quincy, Massachusetts	17 March 1908	16 June 1909	2 February 1910	23 December 1919	C-5	17 November 1911	SS-16	17 July 1920	Sold for scrapping, 13 April 1920

== See also ==
- U-5-class submarine (Austria-Hungary) — three built to same design
