= USS C-3 =

C-class submarine of the United States

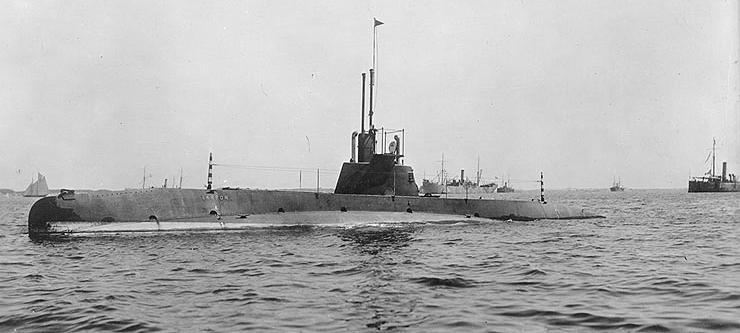
- USS Tarpon underway, 1909

History

United States
- Name: Tarpon
- Namesake: The tarpon
- Builder: Fore River Shipbuilding Company, Quincy, Massachusetts
- Cost: $300,331.08 (hull and machinery)
- Laid down: 17 March 1908
- Launched: 23 November 1909
- Sponsored by: Miss Katherine E. Theiss
- Commissioned: 23 November 1909
- Decommissioned: 23 December 1919
- Renamed: C-3 (Submarine No.14), 17 November 1911
- Stricken: 23 December 1919
- Identification: Hull symbol: SS-14 (17 July 1920); Call sign: NUE
- Fate: Sold for scrapping, 12 April 1920

General characteristics
- Class & type: C-class submarine
- Displacement: 238 long tons (242 t) surfaced; 275 long tons (279 t) submerged
- Length: 105 ft 4 in (32.11 m)
- Beam: 13 ft 11 in (4.24 m)
- Draft: 10 ft 11 in (3.33 m)
- Installed power: 480 bhp (360 kW) (gasoline); 230 hp (170 kW) (electric)
- Propulsion: 2 × Craig Shipbuilding Company gasoline engine; 2 × Electro Dynamic electric motor; 2 × 60-cell battery; 2 × shaft
- Speed: 11 kn (20 km/h; 13 mph) surfaced; 9 kn (17 km/h; 10 mph) submerged
- Range: 776 nmi (1,437 km; 893 mi) at 8.13 kn (15.06 km/h; 9.36 mph) on the surface; 24 nmi (44 km; 28 mi) at 8 kn (15 km/h; 9.2 mph) submerged
- Test depth: 200 feet (61.0 m)
- Complement: 1 officer; 14 enlisted
- Armament: 2 × 18-inch (450 mm) bow torpedo tubes (4 torpedoes)

USS Tarpon/C-3 (SS-14), also known as "Submarine No. 14", was one of five C-class submarines built for the United States Navy in the first decade of the 20th century. She was the first boat in the USN to be named for the tarpon.

== Design ==
The C-class submarines were enlarged versions of the preceding B class; they were the first American submarines with two propeller shafts. They had a length of 105 ft 3 in (32.08 m) overall, a beam of 13 ft 10 in (4.22 m) and a mean draft of 10 ft 10 in (3.30 m). They displaced 238 long tons (242 t) on the surface and 275 long tons (279 t) submerged. They had a diving depth of 200 ft (61.0 m). The C-class boats had a crew of 1 officer and 14 enlisted men.

For surface running, they were powered by two 240-brake-horsepower (179 kW) Craig gasoline engines, each driving one propeller shaft. When submerged each propeller was driven by a 115-horsepower (86 kW) electric motor. They could reach 11 kn (20 km/h; 13 mph) on the surface and 9 kn (17 km/h; 10 mph) underwater. On the surface, the boats had a range of 776 nmi (1,437 km; 893 mi) at 8.13 kn (15.06 km/h; 9.36 mph) and 24 nmi (44 km; 28 mi) at 8 kn (15 km/h; 9.2 mph) submerged.

The boats were armed with two 18-inch (450 mm) torpedo tubes in the bow. They carried two reloads, for a total of four torpedoes.

== Construction ==
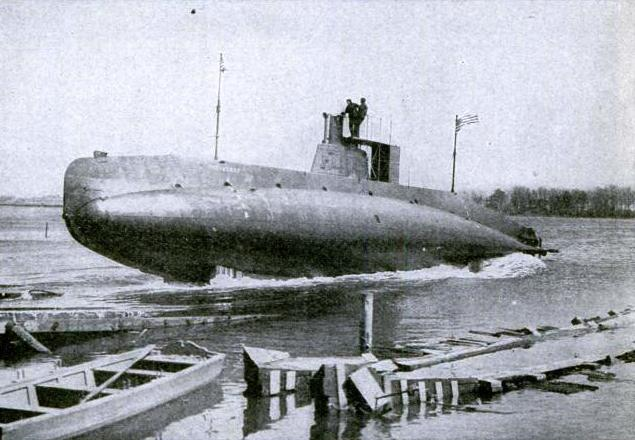
Tarpon being launched in 1909

Tarpon was laid down, on 17 March 1908, by Fore River Shipbuilding Company, in Quincy, Massachusetts, under a subcontract from Electric Boat Company. She was launched on 8 April 1909, sponsored by Miss Katherine E. Theiss, and commissioned on 23 November 1909.

== Service history ==
She was renamed C-3 on 17 November 1911. The boat cruised along the East Coast with the Atlantic Torpedo Fleet and the Atlantic Submarine Flotilla, Atlantic Fleet, through the early 1913, operating in tests and exercises. From May to December 1913, she was based at Guantánamo Bay, and on 12 December, reported at Cristóbal, Colón, Panama Canal Zone. Her operations included exploration of anchorages, tactical drills, and harbor defense patrol at Canal Zone ports. In the summer of 1918, she patrolled off Florida, then returned to Panamanian waters.

== Fate ==
C-3 was placed in ordinary at Coco Solo, Canal Zone, on 22 August 1919, decommissioned there on 23 December 1919, and sold on 12 April 1920.

== Bibliography ==
- "Table 21 - Ships on Navy List June 30, 1919". Congressional Serial Set. U.S. Government Printing Office: 764. 1921.
- Priolo, Gary. "Tarpon / C-3 (SS-14)". Navsource.net.
- Friedman, Norman (1995). U.S. Submarines Through 1945: An Illustrated Design History. Annapolis, Maryland: Naval Institute Press. ISBN 1-55750-263-3.
- Gardiner, Robert & Gray, Randal, eds. (1985). Conway's All the World's Fighting Ships 1906–1921. Annapolis, Maryland: Naval Institute Press. ISBN 0-85177-245-5.
- "C-3 (Submarine No. 14)". Dictionary of American Naval Fighting Ships. Navy Department, Naval History and Heritage Command. 20 August 2024. This article incorporates text from this source, which is in the public domain.
