= USS O-5 =

O-class submarine of the United States

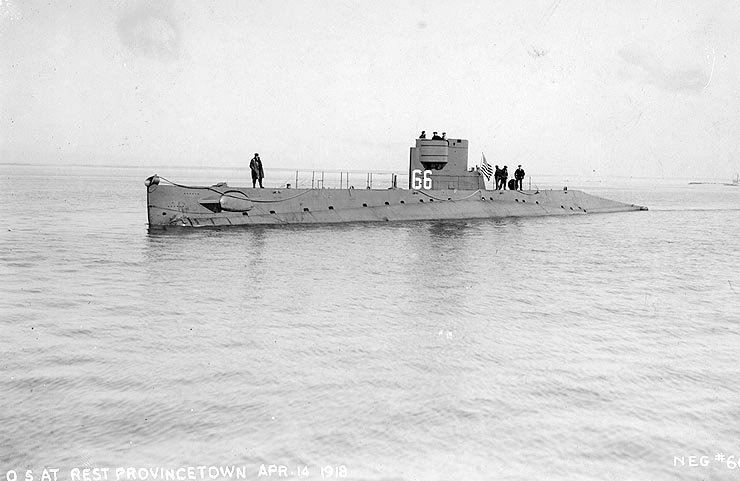
- USS O-5 off Provincetown, Massachusetts, on 14 April 1918, during her trials

History

United States
- Name: O-5
- Ordered: 3 March 1916
- Builder: Fore River Shipbuilding Company, Quincy, Massachusetts
- Cost: $534,424.59 (hull and machinery)
- Laid down: 8 December 1916
- Launched: 11 November 1917
- Sponsored by: Mrs. Nettie Cable
- Commissioned: 8 June 1918
- Decommissioned: 28 October 1923
- Stricken: 28 April 1924
- Identification: Hull symbol: SS-66 (17 July 1920); Call sign: NAMZ
- Fate: Sunk in collision, 28 October 1923; Raised and sold for scrap, 12 December 1924

General characteristics
- Class & type: O-1-class submarine
- Displacement: 520 long tons (528 t) surfaced; 629 long tons (639 t) submerged
- Length: 172 ft 4 in (52.53 m)
- Beam: 18 ft (5.5 m)
- Draft: 14 ft 5 in (4.39 m)
- Installed power: 880 bhp (656 kW) diesel; 740 hp (552 kW) electric
- Propulsion: 2 × NELSECO 6-EB-14 diesel engines; 2 × New York Navy Yard electric motors; 2 × 60-cell batteries; 2 × Propellers
- Speed: 14 knots (26 km/h; 16 mph) surfaced; 10.5 knots (19.4 km/h; 12.1 mph) submerged
- Range: 5,500 nmi (10,200 km) at 11.5 kn (21.3 km/h; 13.2 mph) surfaced; 250 nmi (460 km) at 5 kn (9.3 km/h; 5.8 mph) submerged
- Test depth: 200 ft (61 m)
- Capacity: 21,897 US gal (82,890 L; 18,233 imp gal) fuel
- Complement: 2 officers; 27 enlisted
- Armament: 4 × 18 inch (450 mm) bow torpedo tubes (8 torpedoes); 1 × 3 in (76 mm)/23 caliber retractable deck gun

USS O-5 (SS-66), also known as "Submarine No. 66", was one of 16 O-class submarines of the United States Navy commissioned during World War I.

O-5 was sunk by a collision near the Panama Canal, on 28 October 1923, resulting in the loss of three lives. Lying in 42 ft (13 m) of water with two men still onboard, O-5 was successful raised shortly after noon the following day, saving the two men. The submarine was decommissioned and subsequently sold for scrap.

== Design ==
The O-1-class submarines were designed to meet a Navy requirement for coastal defense boats. The submarines had a length of 172 ft 4 in (52.5 m) overall, a beam of 18 ft 1 in (5.5 m), and a mean draft of 14 ft 5 in (4.4 m). They displaced 520 long tons (530 t) on the surface and 629 long tons (639 t) submerged. The O-class submarines had a crew of 2 officers and 27 enlisted men. They had a diving depth of 200 ft (61.0 m).

For surface running, the boats were powered by two 440-brake-horsepower (328 kW) NELSECO 6-EB-14 diesel engines, each driving one propeller shaft. When submerged each propeller was driven by a 370-horsepower (276 kW) New York Navy Yard electric motor. They could reach 14 knots (26 km/h; 16 mph) on the surface and 10.5 kn (19.4 km/h; 12.1 mph) underwater. On the surface, the O-class had a range of 5,500 nautical miles (10,200 km; 6,300 mi) at 11.5 kn (21.3 km/h; 13.2 mph).

The boats were armed with four 18-inch (450 mm) torpedo tubes in the bow. They carried four reloads, for a total of eight torpedoes. The O-class submarines were also armed with a single 3 in (76 mm)/23 caliber retractable deck gun.

== Construction ==
O-5's keel was laid down on 8 December 1916, by the Fore River Shipbuilding Company, of Quincy, Massachusetts. She was launched on 11 November 1917, sponsored by Mrs. Nettie Cable, and commissioned on 8 June 1918.

== Service history ==
During the final months of World War I, O-5 operated along the Atlantic coast and patrolled from Cape Cod, in Massachusetts, to Key West, in Florida.

On 6 October 1918, O-5 was at the Brooklyn Navy Yard, when Lieutenant (Junior Grade) William J. Sharkey, noticed that the submarine's batteries were giving off toxic gas. Sharkey informed his commanding officer, Lieutenant Commander George Trever, and the two went forward in the submarine to investigate. The batteries then exploded killing LTJG Sharkey, and fatally injuring LCDR Trever. LTJG Sharkey was posthumously awarded the Navy Cross.

O-5 departed Newport, Rhode Island, on 3 November 1918 with a 20-submarine contingent bound for European waters; however, hostilities had ceased before the vessels reached the Azores.

After the Armistice with Germany, O-5 operated from the Submarine School, at New London, Connecticut, until 1923.

When the US Navy adopted its hull classification system on 17 July 1920, she received the hull number SS-66.

=== Sinking of O-5 ===
On 28 October 1923, O-5 was operating with other units of the US Atlantic Fleet, under the command of Commander Submarine Force, Coco Solo, Canal Zone. At approximately 06:30, O-5, under the command of Lieutenant Harrison Avery, was underway across Bahía Limón, toward the entrance to the Panama Canal. The steamship SS Abangarez, owned by the United Fruit Company, and captained by Master W.A. Card, was underway toward Dock No. 6, at Cristobal. Through a series of maneuvering errors and miscommunication, Abangarez collided with the O-5, and struck the submarine on the starboard side of the control room, opening a hole some 10 ft (3.0 m) long and penetrating the number one main ballast tank. The submarine rolled sharply to port, then back to starboard, and sank bow first in 42 ft (13 m) of water.

Three men died (Note: The crew who died were Motor Machinist’s Mate First Class Clyde E. Hughes, Mess Attendant First Class Fred C. Smith, and Fireman First Class Thomas T. Metzler. The bodies of Smith and Metzler were recovered from alongside the boat and interred at the Mount Hope Cemetery in the Canal Zone. The body of Hughes was never found.) and 16 others escaped. Two crewmembers, Henry Breault and Lawrence Brown, were trapped in the forward torpedo room, which they sealed against the flooding of the submarine. Local engineers and divers were able to rig cranes and other equipment and lift O-5 far enough off the bottom that the bow broke the surface, exposing a hatch which led to the compartment where the two men were trapped, allowing them to be freed. Breault, who was in the process of evacuating the submarine when he realized that Brown was still onboard and returned to assist him, was awarded the Medal of Honor for his actions.

=== Recovery of O-5 ===
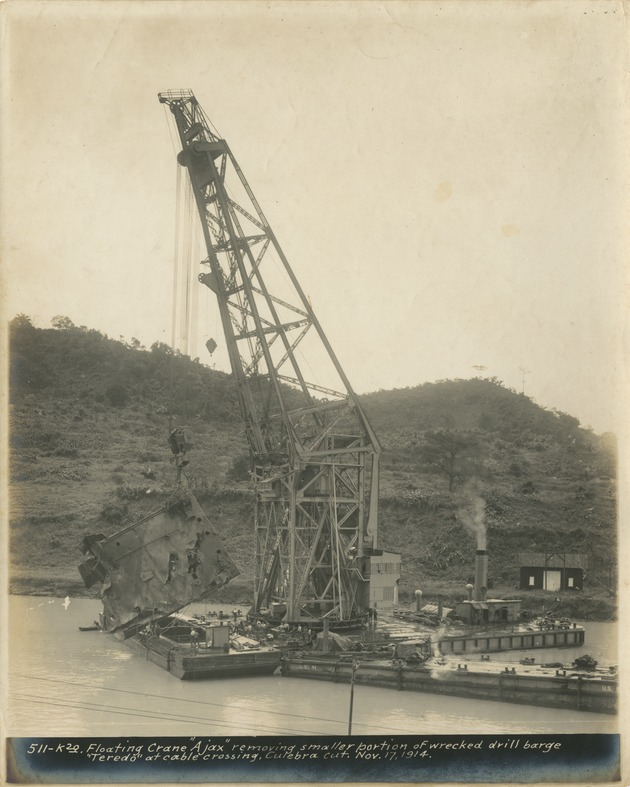
The crane barge Ajax in 1914

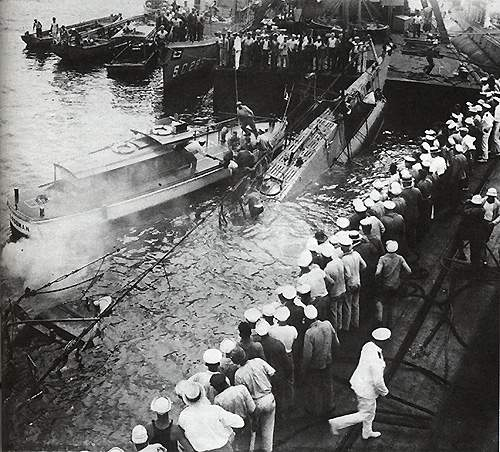
Ajax hauling up O-5

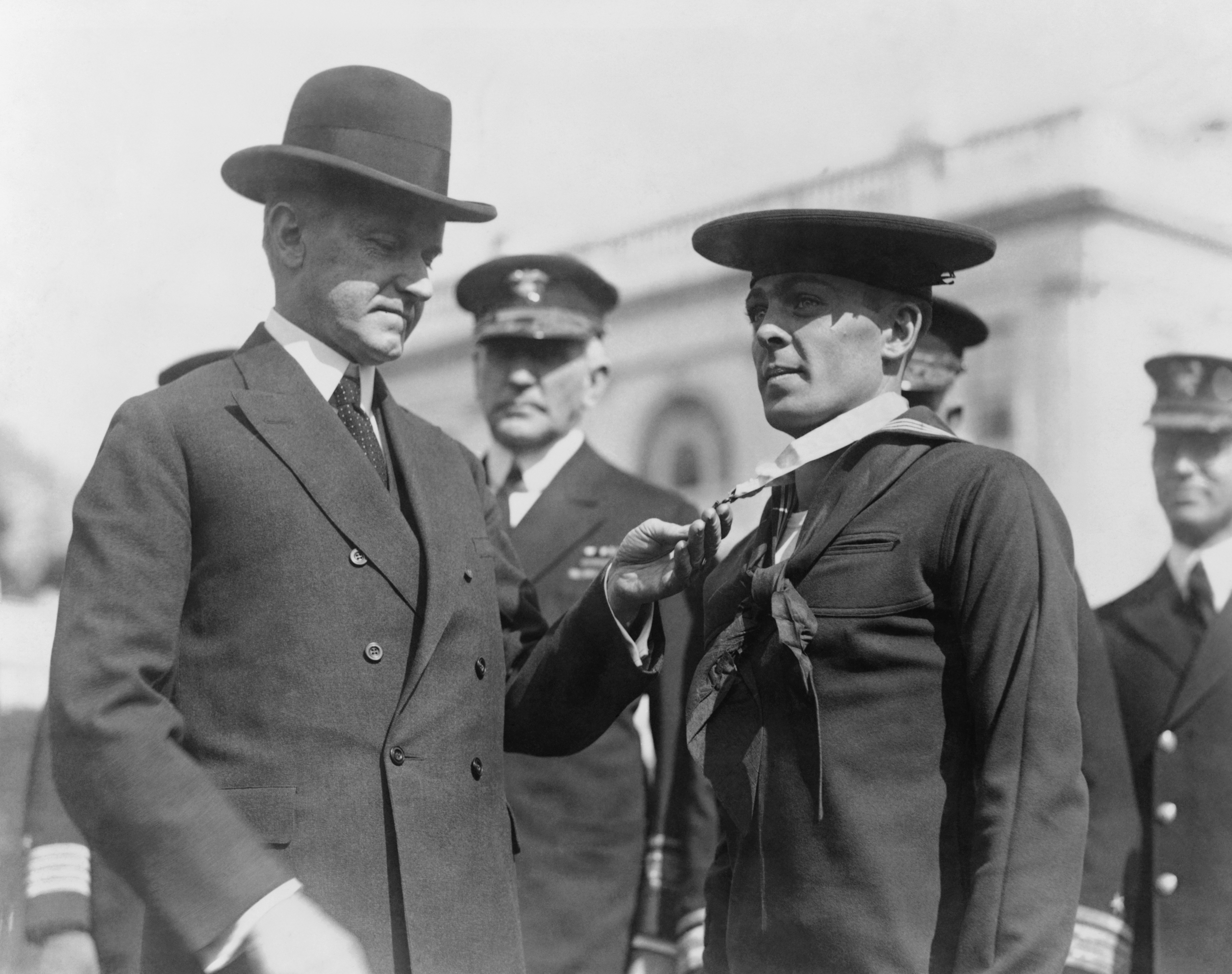
Henry Breault receiving the Medal of Honor from President Calvin Coolidge

Salvage efforts began immediately, and divers were sent down from a salvage tug that arrived from Coco Solo. By 10:00, they were on the bottom examining the wreck. To search for trapped personnel, they hammered on the hull near the aft end of the ship and worked forward. Upon reaching the torpedo room, they heard answering hammer blows from inside the boat. In 1923, the only way the salvage crew could get the men out of the submarine was to lift it physically from the mud using cranes or pontoons. One of the largest crane barges in the world, Ajax, built specifically for handling the gates of the canal locks, was in the Canal Zone. However, there had been a landslide at the famous Gaillard Cut, and Ajax was on the other side of the slide, assisting in clearing the Canal. The excavation shifted into high gear and by 14:00, on the afternoon of the sinking, the crane barge Ajax squeezed through and was on its way to O-5.

Divers worked to tunnel under O-5's bow so lifting cables could be attached. Ajax arrived about midnight, and by early morning, the cable tunnel had been dug, the cable run, and a lift was attempted. Sheppard J. Shreaves, supervisor of the Panama Canal's salvage crew, and himself a qualified diver, had been working continuously throughout the night to dig the tunnel, snake the cable under the submarine, and hook it to Ajax's hoist. Now the lift began. As the crane took a strain, the lift cables broke. Shreaves and his crew worked another cable set under the bow and again Ajax pulled. Again, the cable broke. All through the day, the men worked. Shreaves had been in his diving suit nearly 24 hours. As noon, on October 29, approached, the crane was ready for another lift, this time with buoyancy being added by blowing water out of the flooded engine room. Just after noontime, the bow of O-5 broke the surface. Men from the salvage force quickly opened the torpedo room hatch, and Breault and Brown emerged into the fresh air.

== Fate ==
Struck from the Naval Vessel Register on 28 April 1924, she was raised and later sold as a hulk to R.K. Morris, in Balboa, Panama, on 12 December 1924. The sinking made O-5 valueless for future naval service. She was stripped of valuable fittings and equipment when sold for $3,125. Her original cost had been $534,424.

== Aftermath ==
Lieutenant Harrison Avery was held responsible for the collision on 26 November 1923, but a later Court of Naval Inquiry cleared O-5 of blame for the collision. At the time of his death, in October 1934, Lieutenant Commander Avery commanded the patrol yacht Isabel of the Asiatic Fleet.

United States vs. United Fruit Company (Submarine O-5 – SS Abangarez) continued in the courts. Federal Judge Wayne G. Borah, New Orleans, on 20 August 1932, ruled O-5 was at fault in the collision.

== Bibliography ==
- "Table 21 - Ships on Navy List June 30, 1919". Congressional Serial Set. U.S. Government Printing Office: 768. 1921.
- Gary, Priolo. "O-5 (SS-66)". Navsource.net.
- Friedman, Norman (1995). U.S. Submarines Through 1945: An Illustrated Design History. Annapolis, Maryland: Naval Institute Press. ISBN 1-55750-263-3.
- Gardiner, Robert & Gray, Randal (1985). Conway's All the World's Fighting Ships 1906–1921. Annapolis, Maryland: Naval Institute Press. ISBN 0-85177-245-5.
- "O-5". Dictionary of American Naval Fighting Ships. Navy Department, Naval History and Heritage Command. This article incorporates text from this source, which is in the public domain.
- Hall, Anne Martin (1925). Ships of the United States navy and their sponsors, 1913-1923.
- Stringer, Harry R. (1921). The Navy Book of Distinguished Service. Washington, D.C.: Fassett Publishing Company.
- Christley, Jim (1999). "Submarine Hero: TM2 Henry Breault". Undersea Warfare Spring 1999 Vol. 1, No. 3. Chief of Naval Operations Submarine Warfare Division. Archived from the original on 29 June 2011.
- Grigore, Julius Jr. (February 1972). "The O-5 is Down!". Proceedings. 98 (2). Annapolis, Maryland: United States Naval Institute.
- Submarine Casualties Booklet (Report). U.S. Naval Submarine School. 1966. Archived from the original on 11 September 2009.
