= Ajax (crane barge) =

Floating crane in the Panama canal

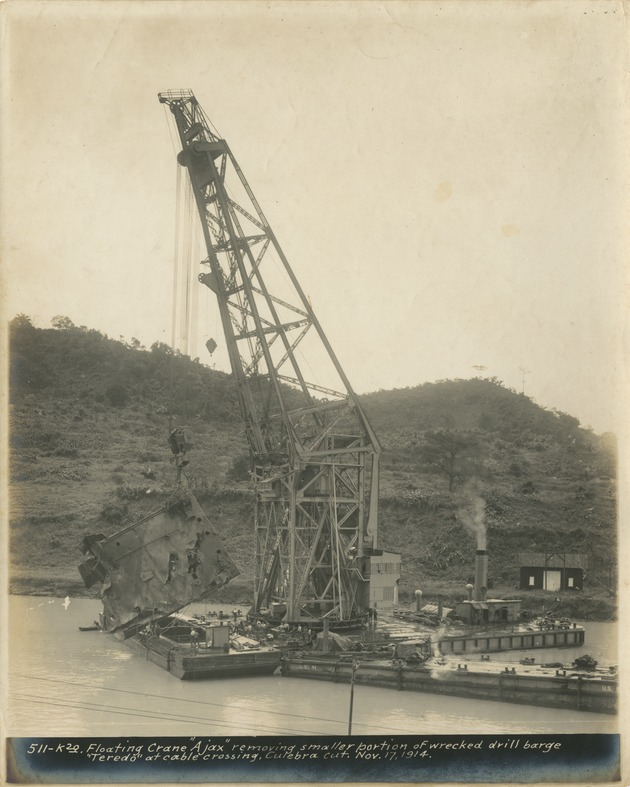
- Ajax crane barge, November 17, 1914, in the Gaillard Cut at the Panama Canal

History
- Name: Ajax
- Operator: Panama Canal Zone
- Ordered: April 21, 1913
- Builder: Deutsche Maschinenbau AG
- Cost: $837,500
- Completed: 1914

General characteristics
- Class & type: Floating crane
- Tonnage: 4000
- Length: 46.25 m (151 ft 9 in)
- Beam: 27.54 m (90 ft 4 in)
- Depth: 4.8 m (15 ft 9 in)

Ajax is a floating crane built to move and install the canal locks and other large parts of the Panama Canal. Ajax also helped in ship repairs and clearing the canal as needed. Ajax and her identical sister crane, the Hercules, were the largest floating cranes at time of completion, able to install the massive Panama Canal locks. Ajax could lift a maximum of 250 tons to a height of 21 feet (6.40 m), with a close reach. At Ajax's far reach she could lift a maximum of 100 tons. Ajax and Hercules were built by Deutsche Maschinenbau AG (1910–1977) (that later became part of Demag, in Wilhelmshaven, Germany). After the Ajax and Hercules, Deutsche Maschinenbau AG later made the Langer Heinrich, or Long Henry in 1915, in use for 100 years.

The contract for the two cranes was signed on April 21, 1913. The cranes were of the revolving type, at a cost of about $837,500 each. The two cranes were to be completed in 580 days and delivered to the Panama Isthmus by December 2, 1914, from Emden, Germany.

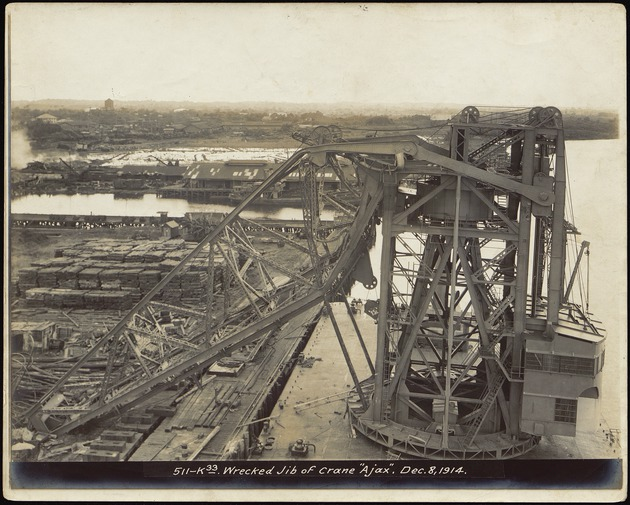
Ajax crane test fail, 1914

The two cranes arrived in Cristóbal, Colón, Panama on December 7, 1914, several months after their scheduled arrival time of July 1914. Ajax performed an acceptance test before being put into service. Ajax was lifting a 20% over max weight at a far reach test, lifting 120 tons of concrete blocks and iron rails as weights. At 4 feet (1.22 m) off the ground the steel framing of the crane's gib failed. The damage to the crane was limited and the repair cost was about $100,000. The Hercules was used to lift the new modified jib framing onto Ajax.

The barges Ajax and Hercules had a length of 46.25 m, a width of 27.54 m and a draft of 4.8 m, with a gross tonnage of 4000 Tons. Both use charcoal to fire the boilers.

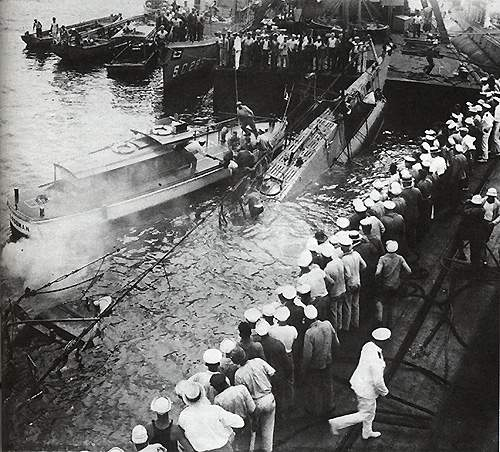
Ajax in 1923 rescue of submarine USS O-5

== Submarine rescue ==
Ajax was called in rescue service after the sinking of United States Navy O-class submarine USS O-5 (SS-66). USS O-5 sank bow first in 42 feet (12.80 m) of water on October 28, 1923, at Limon Bay toward the entrance to the Panama Canal. At the time Ajax and Hercules were trapped behind a landslide at the Gaillard Cut, both were working to clear the landslide. Ajax and Hercules worked nonstop until there was space for Ajax to pass through. Ajax traveled to aid O-5, as divers had found there were survivors in O-5.

Before Ajax arrived divers had already dug a tunnel under O-5's bow for Ajax's lifting cables. Ajax arrived around midnight. Divers completed the cable install under the sub by early morning. Sheppard J. Shreaves was the supervisor of the salvage crew. Sheppard was a qualified diver, had been working himself all throughout the night helping to dig the tunnel under the submarine. Ajax was hooked to the cables run under the sub and worked to hoist the sub up. But the lift cables broke. Shreaves and his crew installed another cable under the bow. Shreaves and his men had been in their diving suits nearly 24 hours working on the rescue. The next lift the cable broke again. Near midnight on the 29th Ajax did its third lift, this lift worked as the divers has pumped air into the sub's flooded Engine Room. The bow of the O-5 broke the surface. The salvage team opened the torpedo room hatch, and two trapped sailors, Henry Breault and Lawrence T. Brown emerged.

== Sale ==
On June 27, 1955, with the completion of the Panama Canal the Ajax was put up for sale by the Panama Canal Company. The Hercules was kept to do maintenance work on the Panama Canal. Ajax was sold to a Venezuelan firm.

== Sian Yung salvage ==
In 1972 the Ajax and Hercules were used together to raise the ship SS Sian Yung. Sian Yung was built as a Victory ship in 1944 and named the USS Lincoln Victory serving in The US War Shipping Administration. In 1947 the USS Lincoln was sold to NASM and renamed Aardijk. In 1962 she was sold again to the Chinese Maritime Trust Company and renamed Sian Yung. Sian Yung sank in the Panama Canal in the Gaillard Cut after hitting rocks in 1970. Several salvage attempts were made and failed. The Ajax and Hercules were able to raise her to the point she could be patched, pumped then moved to the Bay of Panama. In the bay she was half sunk into her final resting place along the shore. Sian Yung sunk with a cargo of rice, baled cotton, and 200 barrels of heavy fuel oil, which were removed before the Ajax and Hercules raised her.

== Retirement ==
In 1966, the Hercules crane received a new boiler that used diesel fuel instead of charcoal. Hercules remained in use at the Panama Canal until a new floating crane was purchased. Dubbed Herman the German, the 350-ton crane, also known as Titan, replaced Hercules in 1996. The Hercules crane is now part of the reserve fleet at the Panama Canal.

== Cultural references ==
Ajax and Hercules are briefly mentioned in Egon Erwin Kisch's 1929 travel report Paradies Amerika.

== See also ==
- Samson (crane barge)
- Naval Base Panama Canal Zone
