= Henry Breault =

United States Navy Medal of Honor recipient (1900–1941)

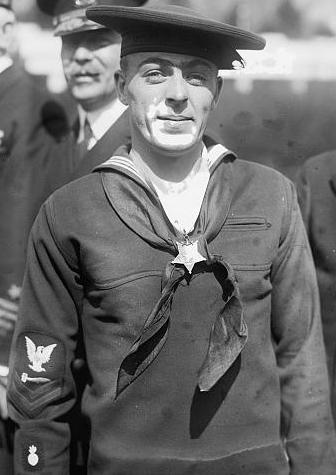
- Henry Breault
- Born: 14 October 1900; Putnam, Connecticut, US
- Died: 5 December 1941 (aged 41); Newport, Rhode Island, US
- Military career
- Allegiance: United States
- Branch: Royal Navy Canadian Volunteer Reserve; United States Navy
- Service years: July 24, 1917 – December 31, 1918 (Royal Navy Canadian Volunteer Reserve); July 14, 1920 – December 5, 1941 (U.S. Navy)
- Rank: Torpedoman's Mate Petty Officer First Class (U.S. Navy)
- Unit: USS O-5 (SS-66)
- Conflicts: Halifax Explosion, Yangtze River
- Awards: Medal of Honor

Henry Breault (14 October 1900 – 5 December 1941) was a United States Navy submarine sailor who received the Medal of Honor for his actions while serving aboard the submarine USS O-5 (SS-66). He was the first submariner and he remains the only enlisted submariner to be awarded the Medal of Honor for actions aboard a United States submarine.

== Biography ==
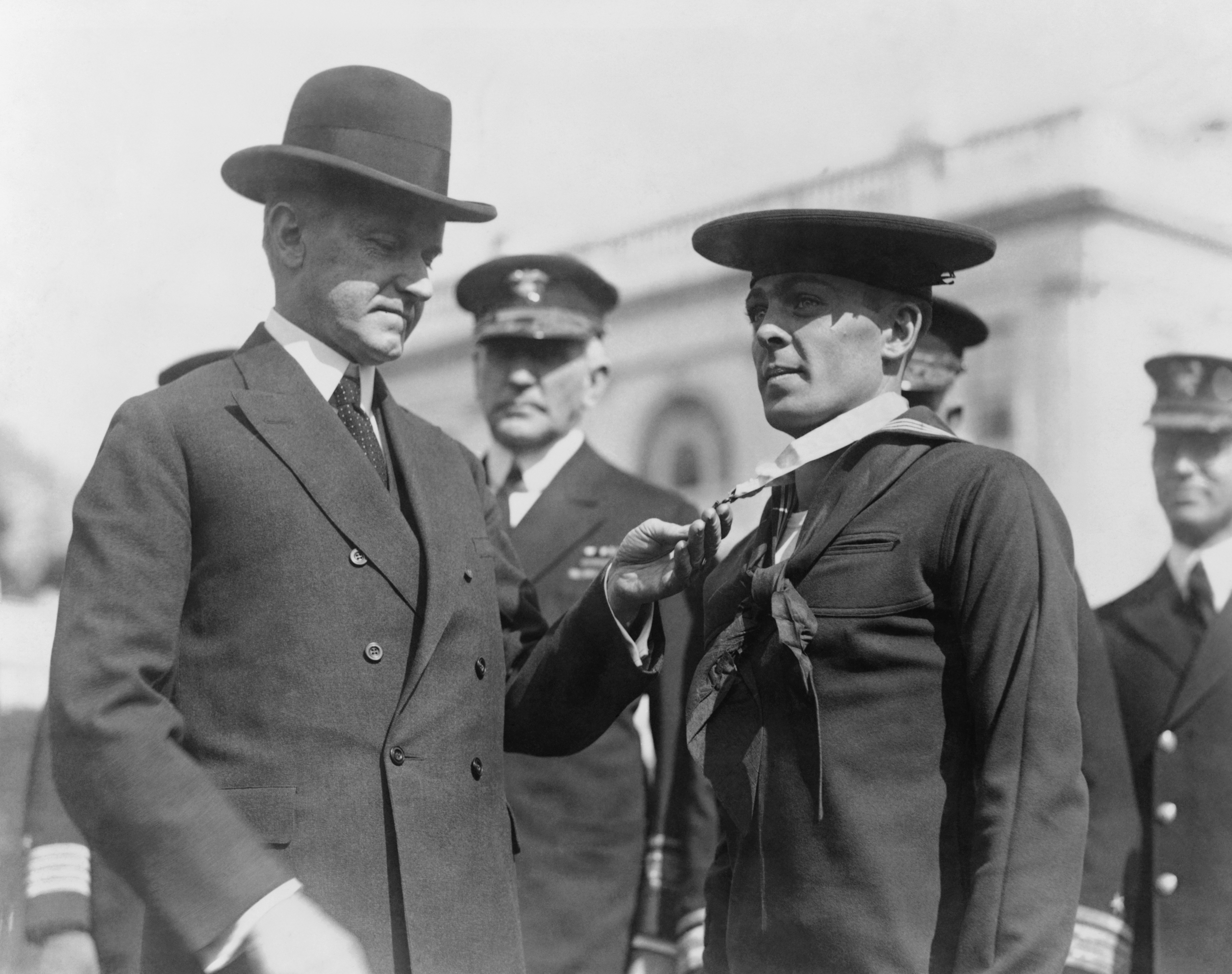
Henry Breault (center) receives the Medal of Honor from President Calvin Coolidge.

Henry Breault was born in Putnam, Connecticut, on 14 October 1900. During World War I he enlisted in the British Royal Navy at sixteen years of age and, after serving under the White Ensign for four years, joined the U.S. Navy in 1920.

On 28 October 1923, Torpedoman Second Class Breault was a member of the crew of USS O-5 (SS-66) when that submarine was involved in a collision near the Panama Canal. Though he could have escaped, Breault chose to assist a shipmate and both became trapped inside the submarine when it sunk. The submarine was raised, and both were rescued, more than a day later. For his "heroism and devotion to duty" on this occasion, Breault was awarded the Medal of Honor, which he received from President Calvin Coolidge in ceremonies at the White House in Washington, D.C., on 8 March 1924. Breault was the first submariner to receive the Medal of Honor and remains the only enlisted man to receive the Medal of Honor for heroism while serving as a submariner. (Note: Seven submarine commanders received the Medal of Honor during World War II. Master Chief Petty Officer William R. Charette received the Medal of Honor for heroism while a Navy corpsman during the Korean War and later joined the submarine service.)

Following 20 years of U.S. Navy service, Henry Breault became ill with a heart condition. He died at the Naval Hospital at Newport, Rhode Island, on 5 December 1941 at age 41. He was buried in Saint Mary Cemetery in Putnam, Connecticut.

== Medal of Honor action ==
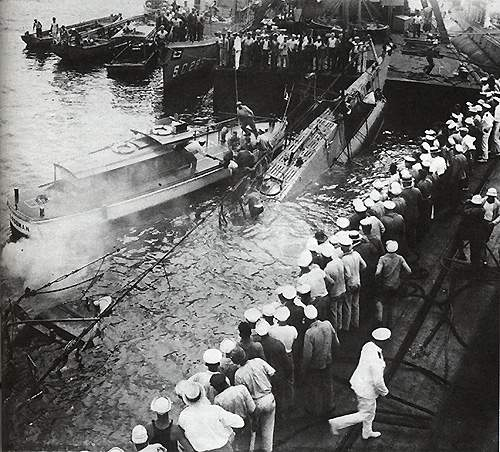
Ajax hauling up USS O-5. Two men who were trapped in engineroom are shown shortly after rescue. One is in white T-shirt being helped off deck. The other is kneeling on deck holding a wire stay. They are: Lawrence T. Brown, chief electrician's mate, and Henry Breault, torpedoman second class. The Captain of the Panama Canal launch Rodman reaches out to pull Torpedoman Second Class Henry Breault on board as others rush to assist Chief Lawrence T. Brown. Breault and Brown of the submarine O-5 had been trapped for 31 hours when, on 28 October 1923, their submarine collided with a freighter in the Panama Canal's main channel and sank in seven fathoms of water within a minute after the collision. The officer at the lower right is reported to be Commander Allan R. McCann

On 28 October 1923, the USS O-5 (SS-66) was operating with other units of the U.S. Atlantic Fleet under the command of Commander Submarine Force, Coco Solo, Canal Zone. At approximately 0630, USS O-5, under the command of Lieutenant Harrison Avery, was underway leading a column of submarines consisting of O-5, O-3 (SS-64), O-6 (SS-67), and O-8 (SS-69) across Limon Bay toward the entrance to the Panama Canal. The steamship SS Abangarez, owned by the United Fruit Company and captained by Master W.A. Card, was underway toward Dock No. 6 at Cristobal. Through a series of maneuvering errors and miscommunication, the SS Abangarez collided with O-5 and struck the submarine on the starboard side of the control room, opening a hole some ten feet long and penetrating the number one main ballast tank. The submarine rolled sharply to port – then back to starboard – and sank bow first in 42 feet (13 m) of water.

The steamship picked up eight survivors – including the commanding officer – who had either been topside or climbed up quickly through the conning tower hatch. Nearby tugs and ships rescued several others. Eight minutes after O-5 sank, Chief Machinist's Mate C.R. Butler surfaced in an air bubble. In all, 16 crewmen were rescued. Five were missing: Chief Electrician's Mate Lawrence T. Brown, Torpedoman's Mate Second Class Henry Breault, plus three others. (Note: Motor Machinist's Mate First Class Clyde E. Hughes, Mess Attendant First Class Fred C. Smith, Fireman First Class Thomas T. Metzler were the other missing sailors.)

Henry Breault had been working in the torpedo room when the collision occurred, and he headed up the ladder topside. As he gained the main deck, he realized that Chief Brown was asleep below. Instead of going over the side, Breault headed back below to get Brown and shut the deck hatch over his head just as the bow went under. Brown was awake, but unaware of the order to abandon ship. Both men headed aft to exit through Control, but the water coming into the Forward Battery compartment made that escape route unusable. They made it through the rising water to the torpedo room and had just shut and dogged the door when the battery shorted and exploded. Breault knew the bow was under, and they were trapped.

Salvage efforts began immediately, and divers were sent down from a salvage tug that arrived from Coco Solo. By 10:00 am, they were on the bottom examining the wreck. To search for trapped personnel, they hammered on the hull near the aft end of the ship and worked forward. Upon reaching the torpedo room, they heard answering hammer blows from inside the boat. In those days before modern safety and rescue devices, the only way the salvage crew, under the command of Captain Amos Bronson Jr., could get the men out of the boat was to lift it physically from the mud using cranes or pontoons. There were no pontoons within 2,000 miles (3,200 km) of the site, but two of the largest crane barges in the world, Ajax and Hercules, were in the Canal Zone. They had been built specifically for handling the gates of the canal locks. However, there had been a landslide at the famous Gaillard Cut, and both barges were on the other side of the slide, assisting in clearing the Canal. The excavation shifted into high gear and by 2:00 pm on the afternoon of the sinking, the crane barge Ajax squeezed through and was on its way to the O-5 site.

Divers worked to tunnel under O-5's bow so lifting cables could be attached. Ajax arrived about midnight, and by early morning, the cable tunnel had been dug, the cable run, and a lift was attempted. Sheppard J. Shreaves, supervisor of the Panama Canal's salvage crew and himself a qualified diver, had been working continuously throughout the night to dig the tunnel, snake the cable under the submarine, and hook it to Ajax's hoist. Now the lift began. As the crane took a strain, the lift cables broke. Shreaves and his crew worked another cable set under the bow and again Ajax pulled. Again, the cable broke. All through the day, the men worked. Shreaves had been in his diving suit nearly 24 hours. As noon on 29 October approached, the crane was ready for another lift, this time with buoyancy being added by blowing water out of the flooded Engine Room. Then, just after noontime, the bow of O-5 broke the surface. Men from the salvage force quickly opened the torpedo room hatch, and Breault and Brown emerged into the fresh air. (Note: Two of the other missing men's bodies were recovered from alongside the boat and interred at the Mount Hope Cemetery in the Canal Zone. Petty Officer Clyde E. Hughes' body was never found.)

== Brown's account ==
Breault and I separated to pound on each of the boat's sides. In this way, the rescuers would know that there were two of us. Breault played a kind of tune with his hammer, indicating to the diver that we were in good shape and cheerful. Neither of us knew Morse Code. We had no food or water, and only a flashlight. We were confident we could stay alive for forty-eight hours. ...The high pressure and foul air gave us severe headaches. We did very little moving or talking; it excited our hearts too much. ...We heard scraping on the hull for hours. A couple of times we felt the O-5 being lifted, and then we got tossed roughly when the slings broke. We knew they were hard after us. This buoyed our hopes for rescue tremendously. ...Finally, the sub began to be tilted upward slowly. We felt we would escape this time, but it seemed like forever. The last 20 minutes were unbearable. We heard our comrades walking on deck. Breault opened the hatch and we could see daylight. We were saved!!!

== Award Recommendation Path ==
The Commanding Officer of the O-5, LT Avery, began the award process, initially recommended Breault for a Navy Cross. Avery submitted his recommendation on 19 November 1923, citing Article 1709 of the 1920 Navy Regulation Book as a reference. The recommendation reads:

1. In view of the extraordinary heroism displayed by Breault, H., TM2c, when the O-5 was sunk in collision with the S.S. ABANGAREZ, it is earnestly recommended that the above named man be awarded the Navy Cross.

2. The following is a history of the extraordinary heroism displayed by Breault:

At 6:24 on the morning of October 28, the O-5 collided with the S.S. ABANGAREZ, and sank in less than one minute. Breault at the time of the collision was in the torpedo room. As soon as the collision occurred he went up the torpedo room hatch and looked out on deck. Upon his arrival at the top of the hatch he saw the boat was sinking very fast and instead of jumping overboard as a number of the crew had already done, thereby trying to save his own life, he went back to the torpedo room, closed the torpedo room hatch on himself, and the assisted Brown, another member of the crew who had been trapped in the boat, to close the water-tight door between the forward battery compartment and the torpedo room. By the time this door was closed the boat had sunk in forty feet of water with every compartment flooded except the torpedo room. Breault and Brown remained trapped in this compartment until they were rescued thirty-one hours later by the salvage party. During this time their efforts were concentrated on stopping leaks between the forward battery and the torpedo room.

3. The conduct displayed by Breault by casting all personal safety aside when he saw that the O-5 was sinking fast and going below to close the torpedo room hatch and even closing same while water was coming into the compartment showed that his devotion to duty was of the highest order. The Commanding Officer therefore earnestly recommends that he be awarded a Navy Cross in recognition of this action, so in keeping with the best traditions of the Navy.

Avery forwarded his recommendation to the Commander of Submarine Division Eight, R. H. English. English reviewed it and added the Commander of the Submarine Force, A. Bronson to the recommendation. They both concurred with Avery's assessment on 23 November 1923, and forwarded their recommendations to the Control Force Commander, RADM Montgomery M. Taylor. Taylor felt Breault was more deserving, Taylor's recommendation reads:

The Commander Control Force is of the opinion that the unusual heroic conduct of Breault and his devotion to duty, particularly in that he almost surely saved Brown's life at the risk of his own and in that his devotion to duty saved a [considerable] loss of Government property, deserves recognition. Accordingly, it is requested that Breault be recommended for the Congressional Medal of Honor.

While Taylor was not the originator, his recommendation to award the Medal of Honor superseded all other recommendations and changed the nature of the award. Secretary of the Navy Edwin Denby concurred with Taylor's assessment that awarding a Medal of Honor was merited and ordered General Order No. 125 to be drafted.

== Later life ==
Breault remained in the Navy after receiving the Medal of Honor and was promoted to Torpedoman's Mate First Class. He was assigned to the destroyer USS Truxtun on 15 September 1939. While serving in Truxtun he participated in convoy escorts as part the Neutrality Patrol while the United States was a neutral power in the early stages of World War II. He was transferred to Submarine Base New London on 4 September 1940. He was still on active duty when he died of a heart condition on 5 December 1941 at the Newport Naval Hospital in Newport, Rhode Island. He is buried in St. Mary's Cemetery in his hometown of Putnam, Connecticut.

== Medal of Honor citation ==
Rank and organization: Torpedoman Second Class, U.S. Navy. Born: 14 October 1900, Putnam, Conn. Accredited to: Vermont. G.O. No.: 125, 20 February 1924.

Citation:

For heroism and devotion to duty while serving on board the U.S. submarine O-5 at the time of the sinking of that vessel. On the morning of 28 October 1923, the O-5 collided with the steamship Abangarez and sank in less than a minute. When the collision occurred, Breault was in the torpedo room. Upon reaching the hatch, he saw that the boat was rapidly sinking. Instead of jumping overboard to save his own life, he returned to the torpedo room to the rescue of a shipmate whom he knew was trapped in the boat, closing the torpedo room hatch on himself. Breault and Brown remained trapped in this compartment until rescued by the salvage party 31 hours later.

For his role in the rescue, Sheppard Shreaves later received the Congressional Life Saving Medal, presented personally by Breault and Brown that same year.

== Awards and decorations ==
=== United States Navy ===

Medal of Honor
Navy Good Conduct Medal with four enlistment clasps	Yangtze Service Medal	American Defense Service Medal with "FLEET" clasp

=== Royal Navy ===

British War Medal	Victory Medal

== See also ==
- List of Medal of Honor recipients
- List of Medal of Honor recipients in non-combat incidents
