= SS Lincoln Victory =

United States Merchant Marine ship

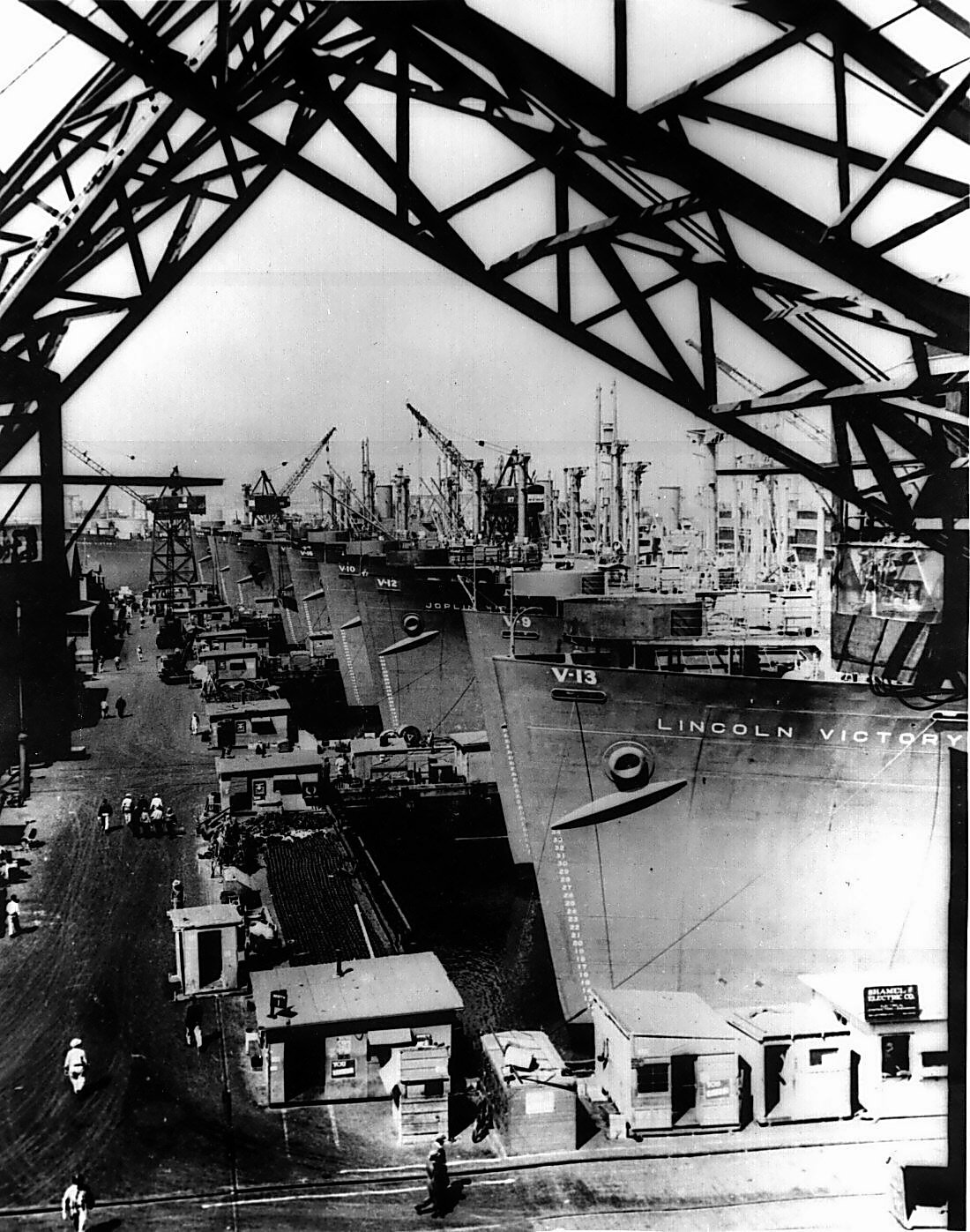
- SS Lincoln Victory and other Victory ships at a U.S. west coast shipyard Calship yard, Wilmington, California in 1944.

History

United States
- Name: Lincoln Victory
- Namesake: Lincoln, Nebraska-Abraham Lincoln
- Owner: War Shipping Administration
- Operator: Eastern SS Lines
- Builder: California Shipbuilding Company, Los Angeles
- Yard number: V13
- Laid down: February 26, 1944
- Launched: April 27, 1944
- Completed: June 15, 1944
- Home port: Los Angeles
- Identification: IMO number: 5326746; Call sign: WMYY
- Fate: Sold to the Netherlands, 1947

Netherlands
- Name: Aardijk
- Operator: Holland America Line
- Renamed: Aardyk, 1954
- Home port: Rotterdam
- Identification: Call sign: PCAU
- Fate: Sold to Taiwan, 1962

Taiwan
- Name: Sian Yung
- Owner: Chinese Maritime Trust Company
- Home port: Keelung
- Identification: Call sign: BMDO
- Fate: Partially sunk and abandoned, 6 December 1970; refloated and scuttled in deeper waters, 11 January 1972

General characteristics
- Class & type: VC2-S-AP3 Victory ship
- Tonnage: 7612 GRT, 4,553 NRT
- Displacement: 15,200 tons
- Length: 455 ft (139 m)
- Beam: 62 ft (19 m)
- Draft: 28 ft (8.5 m)
- Installed power: 8,500 shp (6,300 kW)
- Propulsion: HP & LP turbines geared to a single 20.5-foot (6.2 m) propeller
- Speed: 16.5 knots
- Boats & landing craft carried: 4 Lifeboats
- Complement: 62 Merchant Marine and 28 US Naval Armed Guards
- Armament: 1 × 5 inch (127 mm)/38 caliber gun; 1 × 3 inch (76 mm)/50 caliber gun; 8 × 20 mm Oerlikon(a Victory ship)

SS Lincoln Victory was a Victory ship built during World War II under the Emergency Shipbuilding program. She was built by the California Shipbuilding Company, launched on April 27, 1944, and completed on June 15, 1944. The ship's United States Maritime Commission designation was VC2-S-AP3, hull number 13 (V13); she was initially operated by the Eastern SS Lines as a United States Merchant Marine ship.

== World War II ==
The SS Lincoln Victory served in the Atlantic Ocean during World War II. SS Lincoln Victory, along with 96 other Victory ships, were converted to troopships to bring the US soldiers home as part of Operation Magic Carpet. She departed the so-called Cigarette Camps in Europe to bring troops home. She had two notable Atlantic crossings. On Dec. 17, 1945, she steamed out of Le Havre, France with 1,535 troops arriving in Boston on Dec. 27, 1945. In this trip, she carried the 93rd quartermaster railroad company, the 3914th quartermaster gas supply company, and the 783rd railway shop battalion and transportation corps. In February 1946, she departed from Bremerhaven, Germany, returning soldiers to Camp Kilmer, New Jersey.

== Private use ==
After the war, on May 27, 1947, the Lincoln Victory was sold to the Dutch government's Nederlandsch-Amerikaansche Stoomvaart-Maatschappij, that later became the Holland America who renamed her the SS Aardijk. She began her second maiden voyage on July 23, 1947, from Rotterdam to Cuba, Mexico and then New Orleans. In 1954, she was renamed the SS Aardyk by the Holland America Line.

In 1962, she was sold to the Chinese Maritime Trust Company in Taiwan and renamed the SS Sian Yung. On December 6, 1970, while southbound on a voyage from the Panama Canal to the Far East with a cargo of rice, baled cotton, and 200 barrels of heavy fuel oil, the Sian Yung was damaged after hitting rocks at the Gaillard Cut. To stop her from sinking in the Canal, she was run aground near the Pedro Miguel locks. Several salvage attempts were made, but all initially failed. In 1972, her cargo and entire superstructure was removed so the Ajax and Hercules cranes could raise her, allowing workers to patch her, pump out water, and move her to the Bay of Panama. She was half sunk on Jan. 11, 1972 into her final resting place along the shore, south of Balboa, Panama at 7°44N 79°21W. The owner of the Sian Yung abandoned the ship to its insurance underwriter. A court case on April 30, 1973, decided the cost of the loss.

== See also ==
- List of Victory ships
- Liberty ship
- Type C1 ship
- Type C2 ship
- Type C3 ship

== Sources ==
- Sawyer, L.A. and W.H. Mitchell. Victory ships and tankers: The history of the ‘Victory’ type cargo ships and of the tankers built in the United States of America during World War II, Cornell Maritime Press, 1974, 0-87033-182-5.
- United States Maritime Commission:
- Victory Cargo Ships
