= Sheppard J. Shreaves =

Sheppard James Shreaves
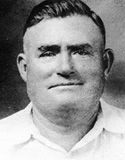
- Born: July 20, 1885; Newport News, VA
- Died: January 1968; St. Petersburg, FL
- Military career
- Service years: 1913–1945
- Rank: Supervisor of Diving
- Nickname: Shep
- Unit: Panama Canal Mechanical Division
- Awards: Gold Lifesaving Medal

Sheppard James Shreaves (July 1885–January 1968) was a Dockmaster and foreman shipwright for the Panama Canal Mechanical Division, as well as a qualified diver and supervisor of the Panama Canal's salvage and diving crew. At age 38, Sheppard Shreaves was awarded the Gold Lifesaving Medal for his heroic efforts in raising of the sunken submarine USS O-5 (SS-66) with two men trapped in the torpedo room. Working against time, Shreaves enabled the rescue of Lawrence Brown and Henry Breault from the bottomed submarine. His being underwater and in his diving suit for almost 24 hours set a new record for the longest duration dives up to that time.

With more than 1,000 dives behind him, Shreaves retired to St. Petersburg, Florida on December 31, 1945, after 32 years of Panama Canal service. He died in January 1968.

== Recovery of the O-5 ==
On 28 October 1923, the USS O-5 (SS-66) was operating with other units of the U.S. Atlantic Fleet under the command of Commander Submarine Force, Coco Solo, Canal Zone. At approximately 0630, O-5, under the command of Lieutenant Harrison Avery, was underway across Limon Bay toward the entrance to the Panama Canal. The steamship SS Abangarez, owned by the United Fruit Company and captained by Master W.A. Card, was underway toward Dock No. 6 at Cristobal. Through a series of maneuvering errors and miscommunication, the SS Abangarez collided with the O-5 and struck the submarine on the starboard side of the control room, opening a hole some ten feet long and penetrating the number one main ballast tank. The submarine rolled sharply to port – then back to starboard – and sank bow first in 42 feet of water.

Salvage efforts began immediately, and divers were sent down from a salvage tug that arrived from Coco Solo. By 10:00am, they were on the bottom examining the wreck. To search for trapped personnel, they hammered on the hull near the aft end of the ship and worked forward. Upon reaching the torpedo room, they heard answering hammer blows from inside the boat. In 1923 the only way the salvage crew could get the men out of the submarine was to lift it physically from the mud using cranes or pontoons. One of the largest crane barges in the world, Ajax, built specifically for handling the gates of the canal locks, was in the Canal Zone. However, there had been a landslide at the famous Gaillard Cut and Ajax was on the other side of the slide, assisting in clearing the Canal. The excavation shifted into high gear and by 2:00pm on the afternoon of the sinking, the crane barge Ajax squeezed through and was on its way to the O-5 (SS-66) site.

Divers worked to tunnel under the O-5’s bow so lifting cables could be attached. Ajax arrived about midnight, and by early morning, the cable tunnel had been dug, the cable run, and a lift was attempted. Sheppard J. Shreaves, supervisor of the Panama Canal’s salvage crew and himself a qualified diver, had been working continuously throughout the night to dig the tunnel, snake the cable under the submarine, and hook it to Ajax’s hoist. Now the lift began. As the crane took a strain, the lift cables broke. Shreaves and his crew worked another cable set under the bow and again Ajax pulled. Again, the cable broke. All through the day, the men worked. Shreaves had been in his diving suit nearly 24 hours. As midnight on the 29th approached, the crane was ready for another lift, this time with buoyancy being added by blowing water out of the flooded Engine Room. Then, just after noontime, the bow of O-5 (SS-66) broke the surface. Men from the salvage force quickly opened the torpedo room hatch, and Breault and Brown emerged into the fresh air.

== Shreaves' account ==
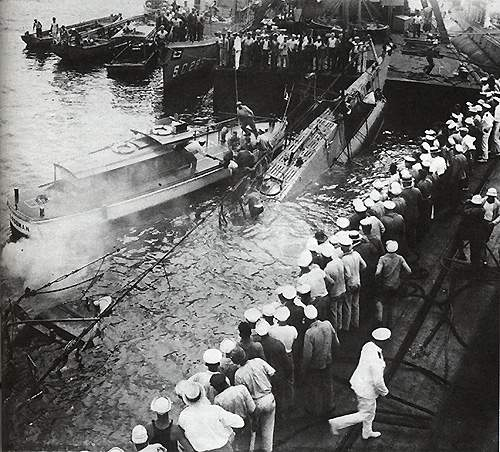
Ajax hauling up USS O-5 (SS-66)

I could spot the O-5 on the bottom by the air bubbles exhausted from the compartment where Breault and Brown were trapped. To survive, they were bleeding air from 3,000-pound compressed air reserves in the forward torpedo room.

... Since the Navy divers had given me a good briefing on the position of the O-5 and the location of the two trapped men, I went right in through her side. The light of my lamp was feeble against the pitch black. The inside was in an awful mess, and it was tight and slippery going. I was constantly pushing away floating debris. When I reached the forward bulkhead of the engineroom I hit it with my diving hammer. Faint raps were returned. Breault and Brown were alive. I acknowledged their taps, but almost with a feeling of hopelessness because I couldn't do anything for them at the time. ... The O-5 lay upright in several feet of soft, oozing mud, and I began water jetting a trench under the bow. Sluicing through the ooze was easy; too easy, for it could cave in and bury me. ... Swirling black mud engulfed me, I worked solely by feel and instinct. I had to be careful that I didn't dredge too much from under the bow for fear the O-5 would crush down on me. Once in a while, I'd rap the hull with the nozzle to let the boys know someone was working to bring them out. Their raps were returned weaker each time. ... I came up from what I hoped would be my last dive. I was near exhaustion. The job below was done and we were ready for a third lift. At 12:30 p.m. on the 29th, from topside, I released compressed air into the engineroom of the O-5 to unflood that compartment and lighten the boat. Water and mud bubbled to the surface as in a boiling cauldron ... I signaled the Ajax to slowly lift the O-5. ... God, how we prayed the cable would take it this time. The intense silence of the rescue force and spectators was electrifying — almost unbearable. ... After what must have seemed a lifetime, the bow finally broke surface. When the hatch was clear the two trapped men crawled out, more dead than alive. They were taken to Coco Solo and placed in a decompression chamber and later transferred to Colon Hospital for examinations. ...

I was a big hero for a while. The boys carried me around on their shoulders. Everybody rushed down to the Stranger's Club in Colon for a big celebration. But me, I went to sleep at the party.

== Recognition ==
Shreaves was recommended for the Congressional Gold Lifesaving Medal by the acting governor of the Canal Zone. He also received an engraved 14-karat gold watch from the appreciative submarine sailors of Coco Solo. The engraving said: "To S.J. Shreaves, from Submarine Force, Coco Solo, C.Z., for his heroism in raising the O-5." Both the medal and the watch were presented to Shreaves by Breault and Brown at a banquet in Cristobol, C.Z. in 1923.

== Further heroism ==
Four laborers were trapped in the hold of the SS Columbia on 16 July 1924. Shreaves went into the hold after them, but he was too late. The laborers died from poisonous fumes, and Shreaves was rendered unconscious. He was commended by the American Red Cross:

Your extraordinary heroism has aroused my admiration. It is one thing to calmly perform a heroic act under the stimulation of a great wave of excitement, without having time to think much of danger, and quite another to calmly face death without excitement and inspiration of dramatic circumstances.

—John Barton Payne
Chairman, American Red Cross
