= Langer Heinrich (crane vessel) =

German floating crane

Coordinates: 44.405799°N 8.924575°E

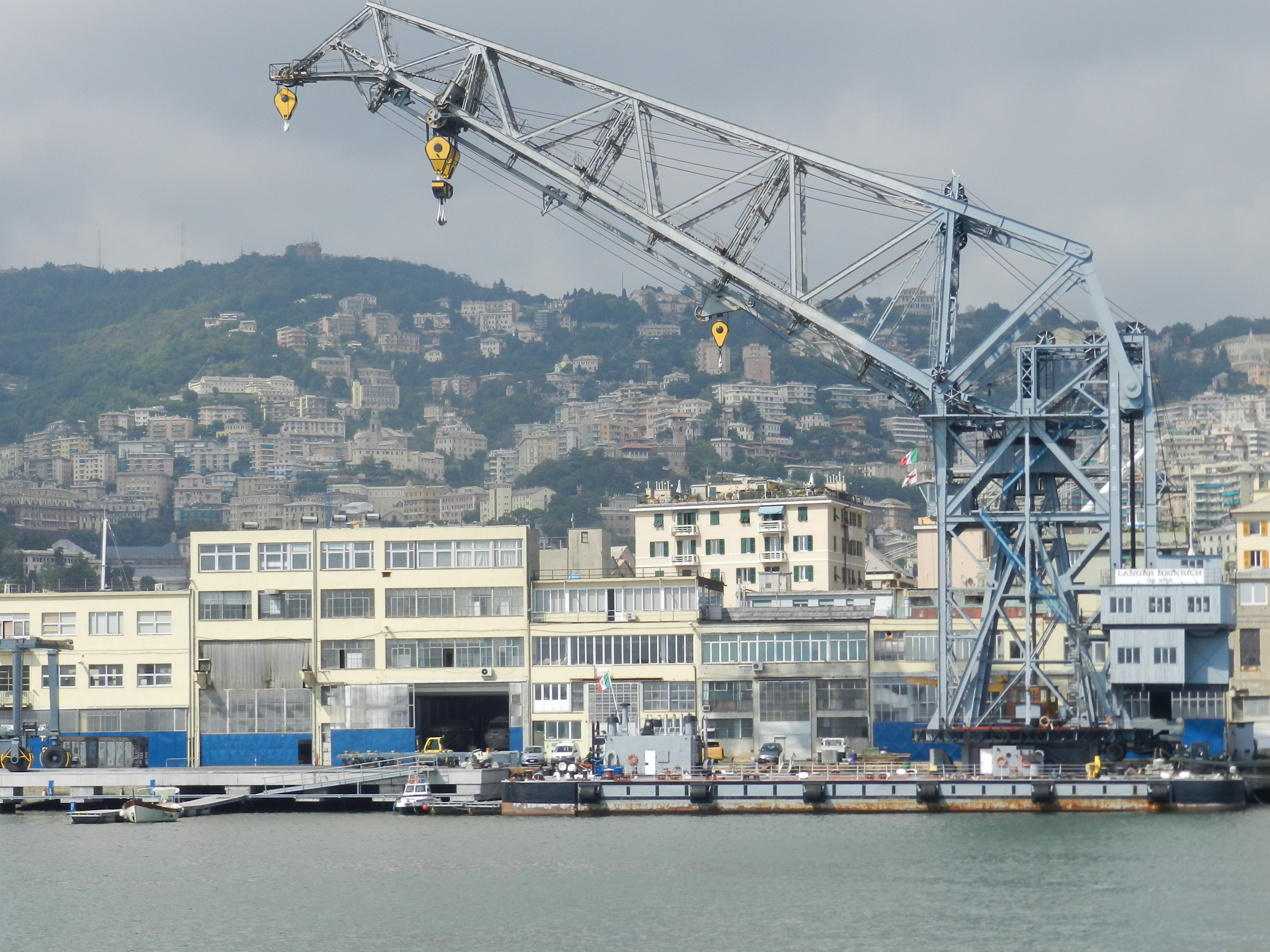
- Langer Heinrich floating crane

History
- Name: Langer Heinrich
- Ordered: 1913
- Builder: Demag and AG Weser
- Yard number: Bremerhaven shipyard
- Completed: 1915
- Renamed: BD-6000(US Army), Maestrale (1985-2015)
- Identification: IMO number: 8959415
- Notes: Website: http://www.langerheinrich.it

General characteristics
- Class & type: Floating crane
- Length: 50.42 m (165 ft 5 in)
- Beam: 30.92 m (101 ft 5 in)
- Height: 81.4 m (267 ft 1 in)
- Depth: 3.05 m (10 ft 0 in)
- Installed power: 1000HP steam engine (1915), four diesel engines (1955)
- Propulsion: Two propellers
- Speed: 4 Knots max
- Capacity: Lift 250 tons max.
- Crew: Min. 2

Langer Heinrich, or in English Long Henry, is a floating crane commissioned in 1915 for the Wilhelmshaven Imperial Shipyard in Wilhelmshaven, Germany and has been located in Genoa, Italy since 1997. At the time of completion she was the largest floating crane in the world, passing up the Ajax crane barge completed in 1914.

== History ==
The imperial shipyard Wilhelmshaven needed a powerful and high lifting crane to help complete battleships before the outbreak of the World War I. The crane was completed in 1915 and originally was known as the Grosser Schwimmkran, but was christened Langer Heinrich. The crane was built by Demag in Duisburg and the float pontoon for the crane was built by AG Weser. The crane needed to lift gun turrets, ship components and sometimes entire ship hulls. It was used to assemble the German cruiser Admiral Graf Spee and German battleship Tirpitz. The pontoon float is 50.42 m by 30.92 m with a depth draft of 3.05 m. The crane displaces 3,898 tons and was powered by two triple expansion steam engines with 1,000 HP each until being refitted with Diesel engines in 1955. The crane had three smaller hoists for lifting 10, 20 and 50 tons. The main hoist has two 125 tonne lifting units which could be coupled for a combined lift of 250 tonnes. The crane had a maximum jib tower height of 81.4 m. The crane is self-propelled with two propellers and floats on pontoons. The pontoon has 41 compartments, some of which can be flooded to counterbalance the load. The superstructure can be rotated through 360 degrees. The crane has a deadweight of 2,393 tons. It was so famous in its day that it used to be pictured on some German bank notes, Deutsche Marks.

After the end of World War I, the United Kingdom claimed the crane as war reparation. The move across the North Sea turned out to be too difficult though and was canceled. Instead, as part of the war reparation, similar cranes were built for Portsmouth, England in 1920 and Brest, France in 1935. When the SS Bremen was built in 1928, the Langer Heinrich lifted the boiler plant into the ship's hull. In 1944 she was used in Bremen, Germany for submarine construction at the AG Weser shipyard. During World War II air raids on Bremen, the Langer Heinrich received minor damage and was subsequently moved to Nordenham for safe storage.

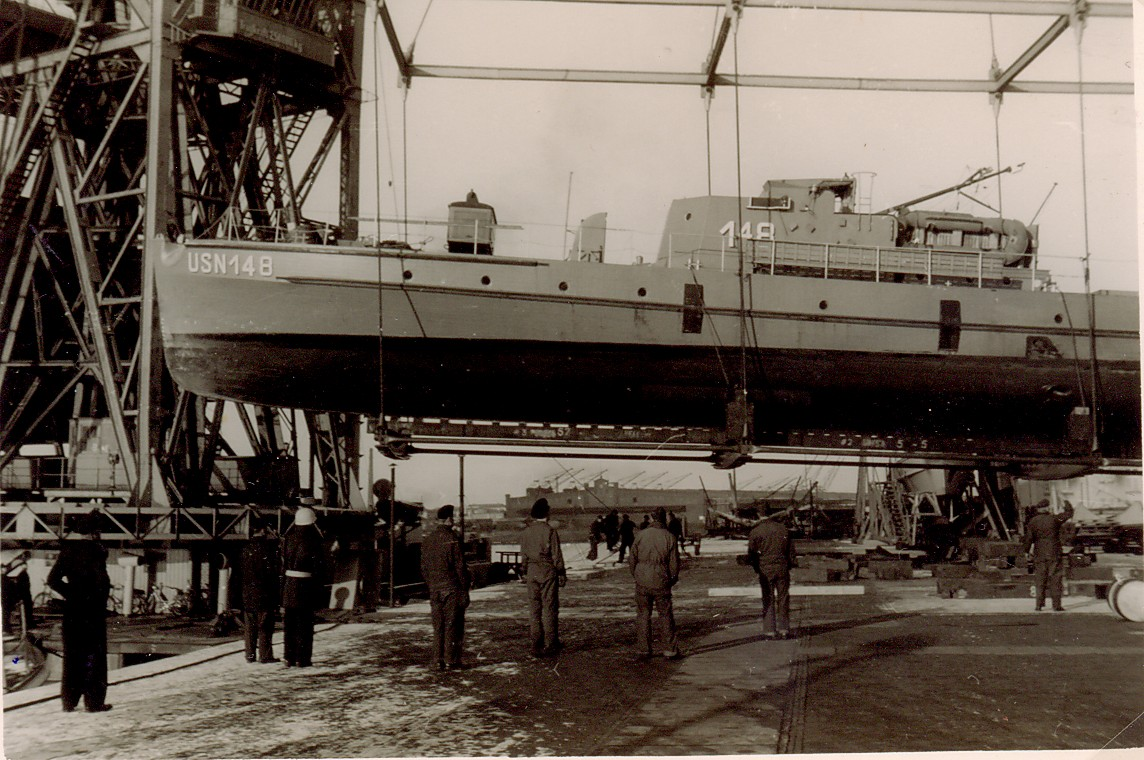
USN 148 lifted by the Langer Heinrich in 1953

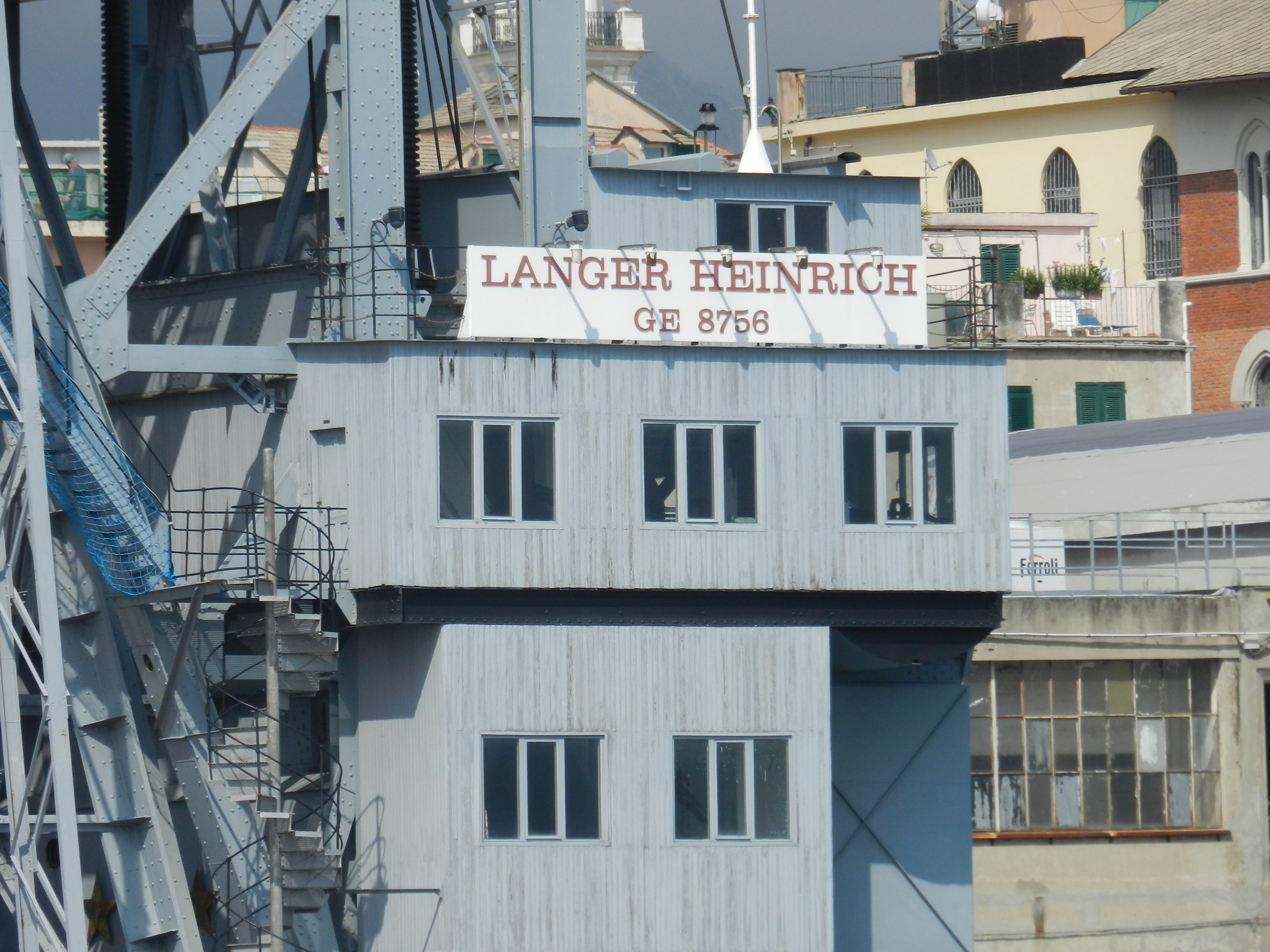
Langer Heinrich

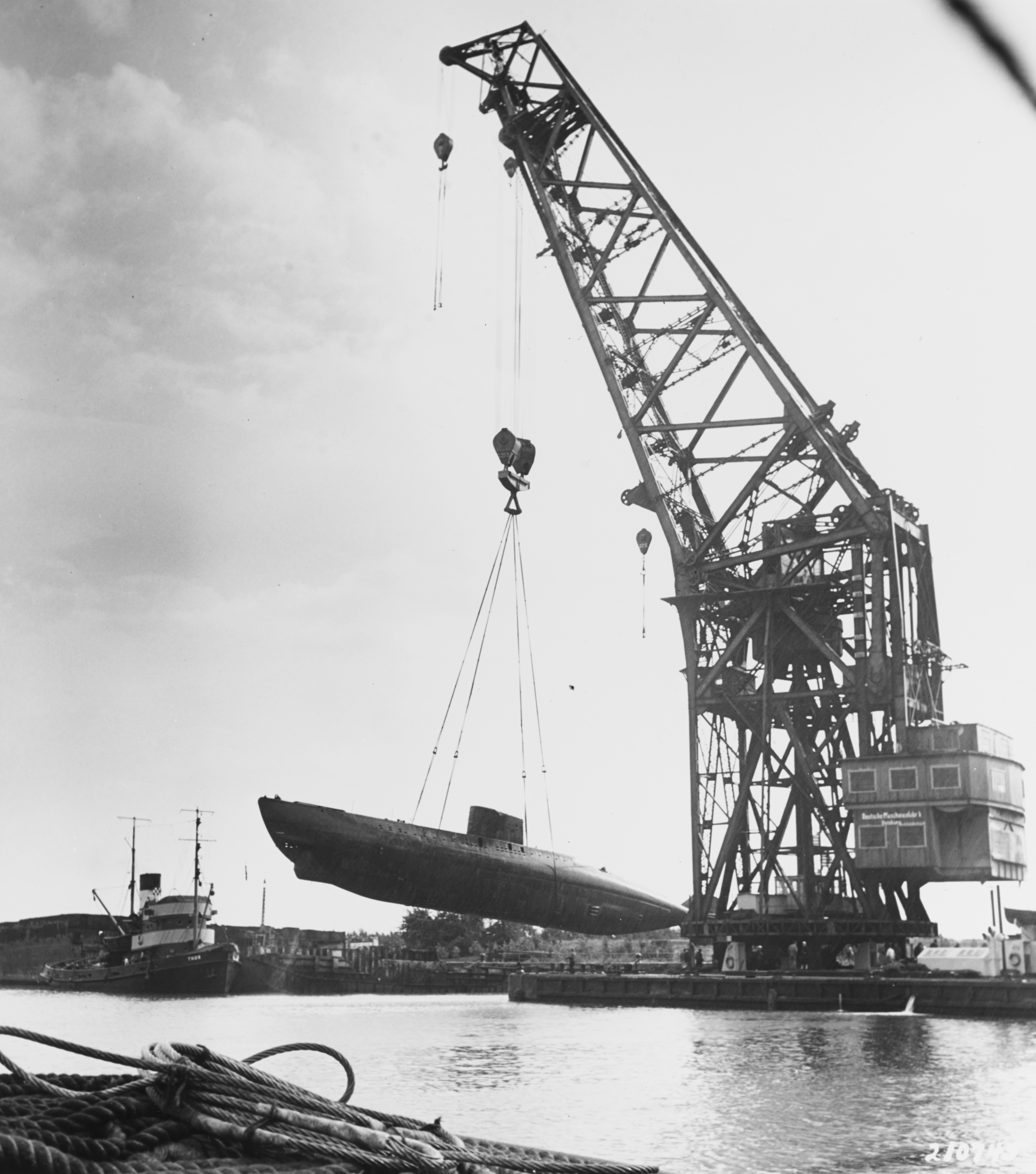
German Type XVII submarine is lifted from the water by Langer Heinrich, at Bremerhaven, Germany on August 11, 1945.

== Bremerhaven ==
After the surrender of the Nazi Germany, the United States Navy confiscated the crane in 1945. Under the designation BD-6000 she was used until November of 1947 in Bremen and Bremerhaven for the American maritime service group, to lift sunk ships in the harbors. She also helped with the repair of the port facilities. In 1950 she was taken over by the United States Army Transportation Corps and taken to Bremerhaven. According to tradition, the largest crane was always called Langer Heinrich, so with the return of the crane, she received her old name again. In the Lloyd Werft Drydock at Bremerhaven the drive system was rebuilt in 1956. The crane now had four six-cylinder diesel engines with 480 hp each. The 1920 hp drives eight generators with 105 kW each and four generators with 50 kW each. Two other 22-horsepower engines and a 105-horsepower diesel engine supplied the on-board system when the crane was idle. The conversion cost 4 million Deutsche Mark. The new electromechanical system was supplied by Siemens-Schuckert companies of Hamburg and Darmstadt. The engine room has installed 4 two-stroke turbocharged diesel engines, each with an output of 358 kW at 600 revolutions / minute. Each engine is coupled permanently to 2 alternators 105 kW and a 50 kW, which make electrical energy at 220 volts.

The crane's ownership was returned to the Federal Republic of Germany in 1985. The crane is used to lift small boats and ships for repair work. She also help the Bremen warehouse company with heavy piece when needed. She help build the many new container bridges at the new Bremerhaven container terminal.

== Genoa ==
In 1985 the crane was sold to an Italian company that moved her from Bremerhaven to Sardinia, she was renamed Maestrale for a short time. She was towed by tugboats after being placed on a 10,000-ton barge. In 1990 she was sold to Maestrale Genova in Genoa and moved to the Port of Genoa, where she help build new ships. In 2002 she was declared a "Monument to Industrial Archaeology" by the Italian government. Thus in 2002 she became part of the Ministry of Heritage and Culture. In 2005, Langer Heinrich underwent general repair work due to her age and to restore her to original look, the work was completed in 2008. She was upgraded and can now lift 275 tonnes max, which she did in her acceptance test. In 2015 the crane was 100 years old. Plan are to make her a part of a museum. The crane regularly hosts cultural activities and tours.
