= Herman the German (crane vessel) =

Floating crane

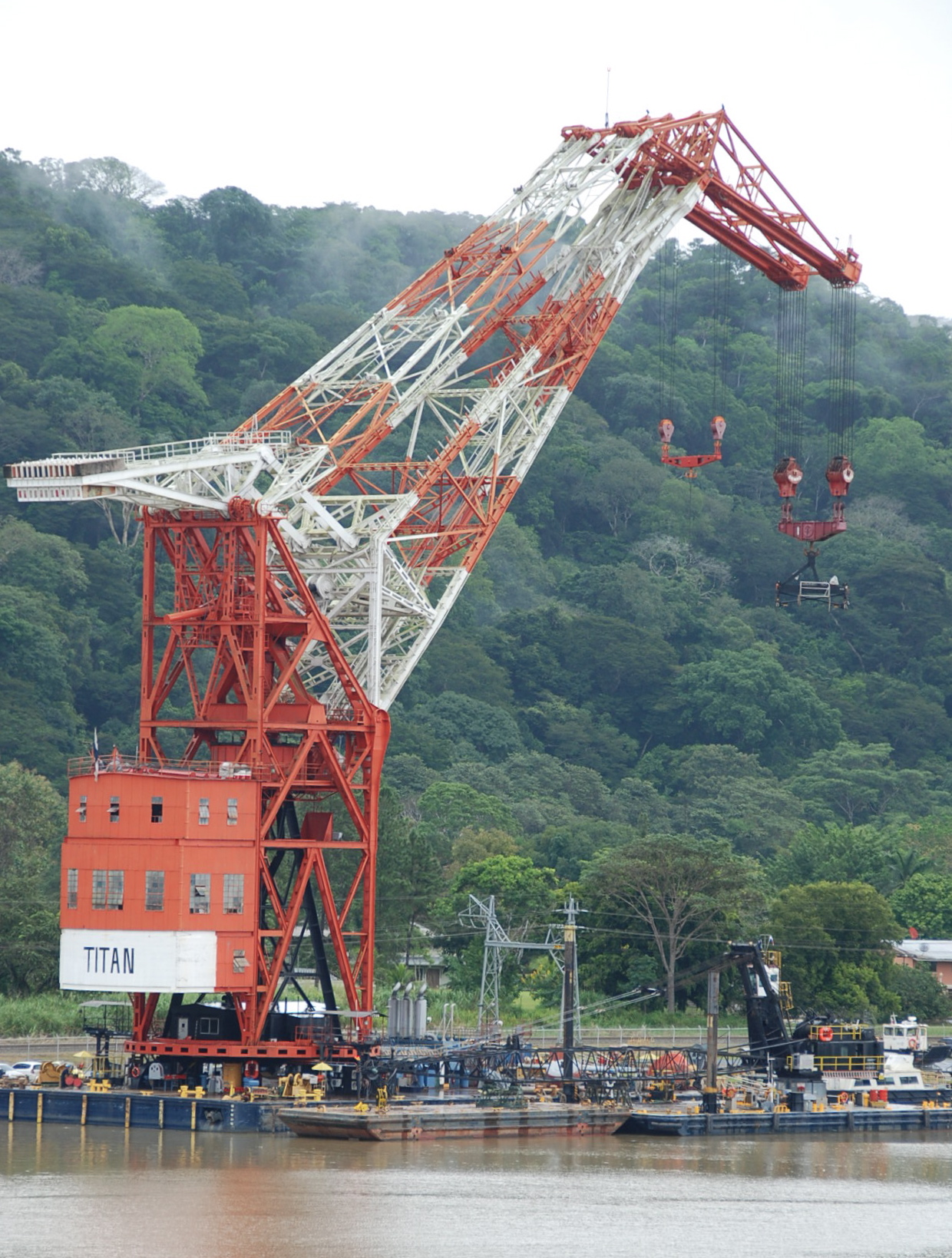
- Titan in Panama (2011)

History
- Name: Grúa Titan (1996–present); YD-171 (1946–1994); Schwimmkran Nr. 1 (1941–1945)
- Ordered: c.1937
- Builder: Demag A.G.
- Completed: 1941
- Acquired: 1996
- Out of service: 2022
- Home port: Panama Canal
- Status: removed from service, Sight in Gamboa

General characteristics
- Class & type: Floating barge crane
- Tonnage: approx. 5000
- Length: 204 feet (62 m)
- Beam: 108 feet (33 m)
- Height: 374 feet (114 m) above water line to top of crane
- Draught: 10 feet (3 m)
- Installed power: 3× diesel generators, 2400 KVA total
- Propulsion: azimuthal thrusters
- Speed: 5.8 knots (10.7 km/h; 6.7 mph) forward, 4.6 knots (8.5 km/h; 5.3 mph) astern
- Crew: 3 officers, 20 men

Titan, better known by its former nickname Herman the German (US Navy designation YD-171), is a large floating crane currently serving in the Panama Canal performing heavy lifts for lock maintenance. Prior to its move to Panama in 1996, the crane was based at the Long Beach Naval Shipyard from the end of World War II until the yard's closure in 1995. It was seized from the German Kriegsmarine following the end of World War II as part of war reparations. The crane was built by Demag Cranes AG as Schwimmkran nr. 1 in 1941 for the Kriegsmarine, where it had served in the Baltic Sea tending German U-boats. MMSI number: 374940000

The crane was one of four sister ships, two of which are still afloat and in service.

== History ==
=== Origins ===
Schwimmkran nr. 1 (Floating crane no. 1) was built by Demag AG in Bremerhaven for the Kriegsmarine. It was captured along with a sister ship by British forces at Kiel.

=== Herman the German (YD-171) ===
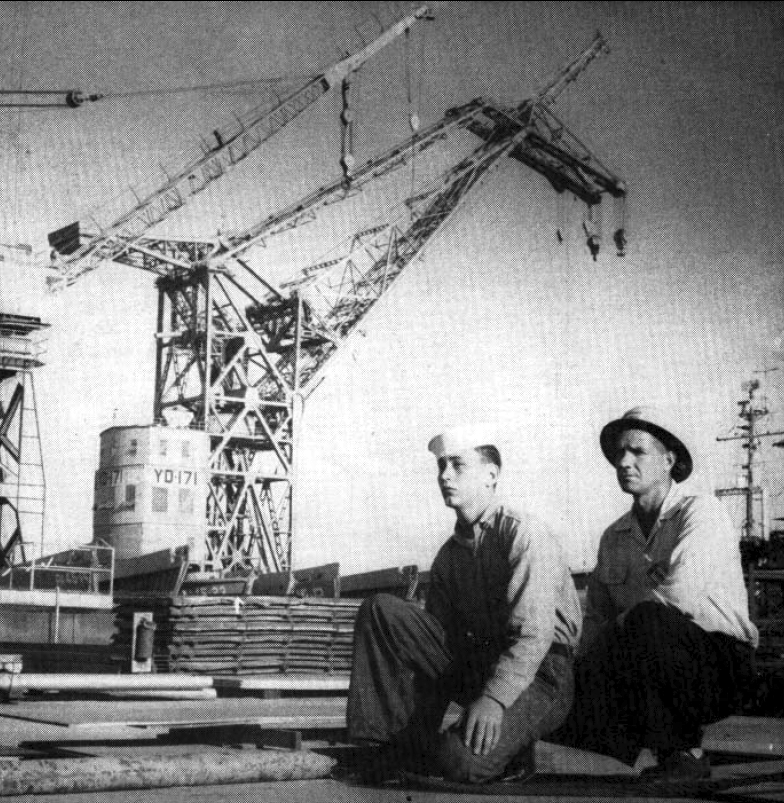
"Herman the German" (YD-171) at Long Beach Navy Yard in 1957

"Herman the German" was seized as a war prize following the end of World War II. "Herman" was dismantled and transported across the Atlantic through the Panama Canal to Long Beach, where it subsequently served at the Long Beach Navy Yard from 1946 (following its reassembly) to 1994 (when the shipyard was closed). YD-171 was reassembled on-site by ex-Kearsarge, a former battleship converted to a large floating crane.

=== Panama Titan ===
Following the closure of the shipyard, the crane was sold to the Panama Canal Commission and it was transported on the semi-submersible ship Sea Swan (IMO number: 8001000) in 1996 to the Panama Canal, where it currently serves as the floating crane Titan. Titan retired Ajax and Hercules that had served the Panama Canal since its construction in 1914.

=== Selected service history ===
Over the years, "Herman the German" performed numerous notable heavy lifts, including:

- Refitting of the battleships USS Missouri and New Jersey in the 1980s
- Lifting the Hughes H-4 ("Spruce Goose") from its original hangar in Long Beach when it was relocated to its geodesic dome from 1980 to 1982 for tourist display by the Wrather Corporation.

== Design ==
The jib is equipped with a level luffing linkage which keeps the main hook at approximately the same horizontal level through its operating radius.

=== Capacity ===
Animation of main and jib boom articulation

Titan is a large self-propelled crane vessel with the tip of its main boom standing at 374 feet (114 m) above the typical water line and a lifting capacity of 385 short tons (349 t). In 1957, it was claimed to be the largest floating crane in operation. Its rated capacity is 350 tonnes (340 long tons; 390 short tons) at up to 114 feet (35 m) from the center of rotation; the lift capacity drops to 50 tonnes (49 long tons; 55 short tons) at 210 feet (64 m) from center, and a single rotation about its pedestal takes 10 minutes.

=== Sister ships ===
Of the four Schwimmkräne built by Demag, one was destroyed during World War II by bombs, and the remaining three were seized by the Allies as war reparations. One went to the Americans, and was transported to the Long Beach Naval Shipyard.

==== Hamburg Schwimmkran ====
The crane stationed at Hamburg served in the Blohm & Voss shipyards and was presumed to be damaged beyond repair during the July 1943 Operation Gomorrah bombing raids. It was reportedly raised after the war and rebuilt with a lower capacity, eventually serving Hamburger Hafen & Logistik AG (HHLA) as HHLA III (MMSI number: 211339980).

==== British Schwimmkran ====
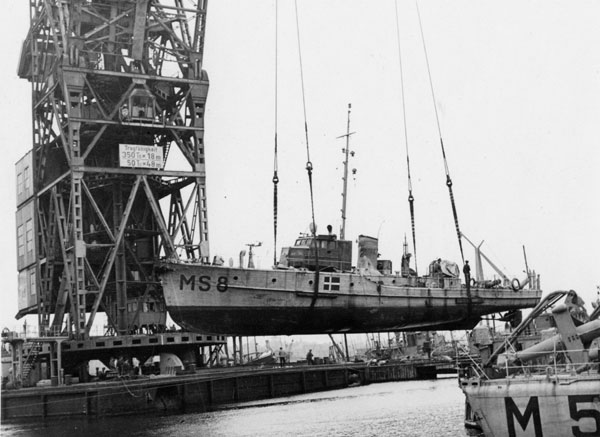
Demag 350 ton floating crane salvaging a minesweeper scuttled by Danes, 1943

The crane eventually seized by the British was initially stationed at Gdynia, then moved to Denmark in 1943–44 to raise Danish Navy ships scuttled during Operation Safari on August 29, 1943. It was subsequently moved back to Gdynia, then Kiel, where it was seized by the British Army at the conclusion of the war. Later, it was sold to France, but it capsized and sank in the North Sea approximately 60 kilometres (37 mi) off the coast of Denmark while under tow on 25 June 1951. It was being towed without disassembling the heavy mast structures.

==== Soviet Schwimmkran ====
A partially-assembled crane was sent to the Soviet Union. It had been ordered by the Soviet government when the governments of Germany and the Soviet Union were friendly, and was reportedly sent to Leningrad, where the Demag technicians sent with the crane to help assemble it were recalled before it could be completed. The partially-assembled structure served as an artillery spotting tower. It was presumed lost after the war until it was spotted in 2015 working in the Admiralty Shipyard at Saint Petersburg (MMSI number: 273435590).
