= David du Bose Gaillard =

U.S. Army engineer instrumental in building the Panama Canal

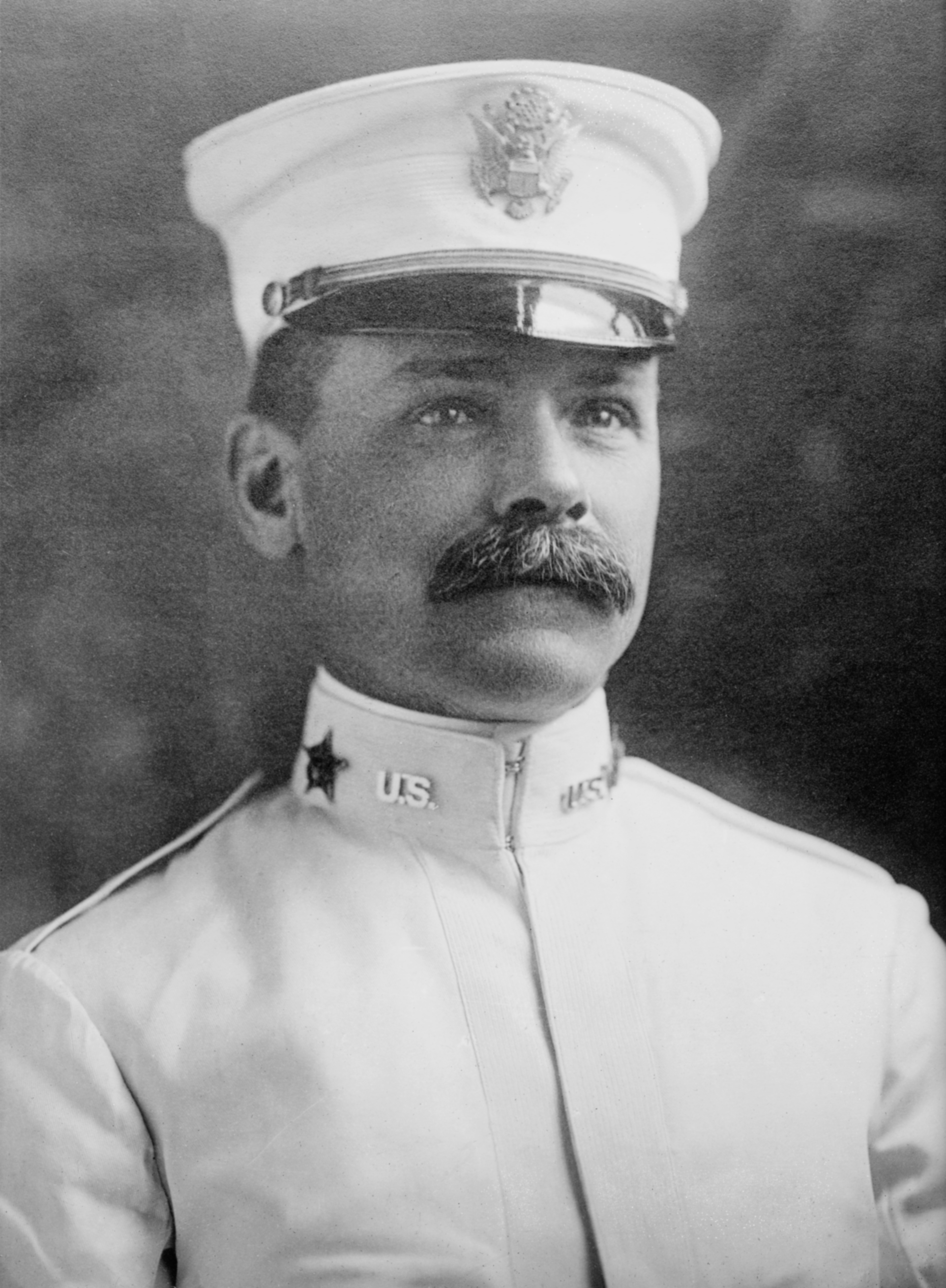
David du Bose Gaillard

David du Bose Gaillard (September 4, 1859 – December 5, 1913) was a U.S. Army engineer instrumental in the construction of the Panama Canal. During the years of the US Canal Zone (c. 1915–2000), the Culebra Cut in the Panama Canal bore his name in his memory.

== Biography ==
Lieutenant Colonel David DuBose Gaillard was born in Fulton Crossroads, South Carolina, which is located in what is now the Manchester State Forest near Sumter. Gaillard graduated from West Point in 1884. After promotion to first lieutenant in 1887, he married Katherine Ross Davis. The couple had one child, David St. Pierre Gaillard. In 1896, Gaillard was secretly dispatched on a military reconnaissance to southern Alaska where he was tasked to build four masonry storehouses at the head of the Portland Channel, due to the Alaska Boundary Dispute. By 1903 he was a captain in the Army Corps of Engineers.

In 1908 Gaillard was placed in charge of construction of the central portion of the Panama Canal, crossing the continental divide. He was in charge of the notorious Culebra Cut through the backbone of the isthmus. Men who worked with him said he gave 12 hours every day to the Culebra Cut, besides which, he took his share in the labor of general administration of the Canal Zone. He checked up expenses, even on small things, and once it was computed he had saved the government $17,000,000.

Gaillard died nine months before the Panama Canal opened. He returned to the US suffering from what was thought to be nervous exhaustion brought on by overwork and died of a brain tumor on December 5, 1913, at Johns Hopkins Hospital in Baltimore, aged 54. He is buried at Arlington National Cemetery.

== Family ==
Gaillard married Katherine Ross Davis at Winnsboro, South Carolina, on October 6, 1887. She accompanied him to Panama and while there collected plant specimens for the United States National Herbarium. While in Panama she was also an orchid collector.
