= Culebra Cut =

Artificial valley that is part of the Panama Canal

Coordinates: 9°4′38″N 79°40′31″W

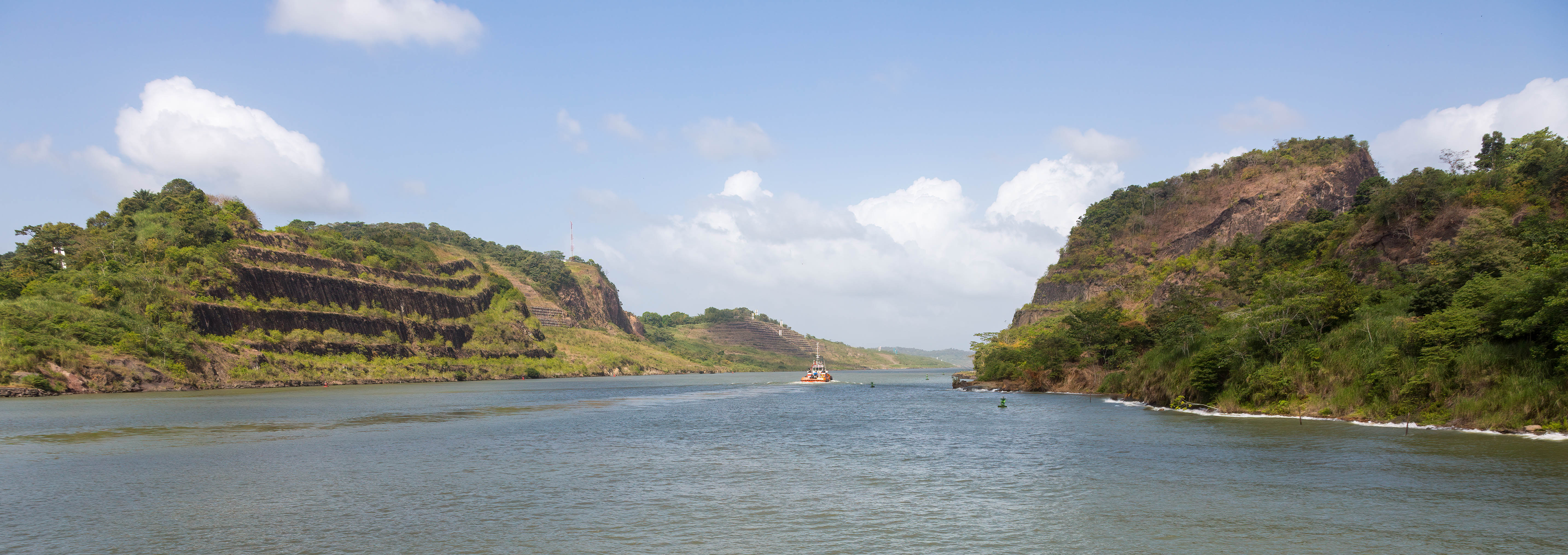
The Panama Canal Culebra Cut in January 2020

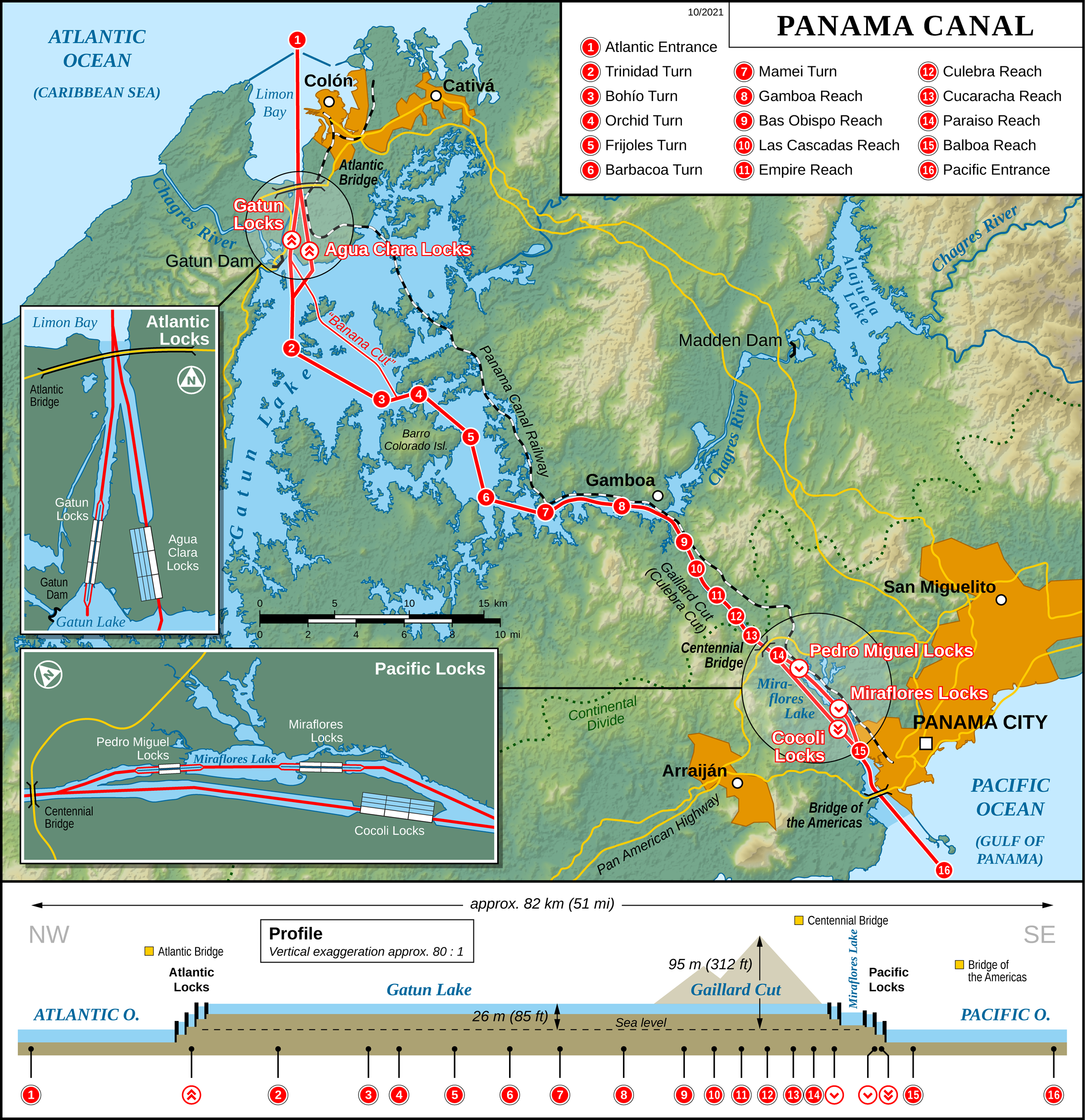
The Panama Canal showing the location of the Culebra Cut

The Culebra Cut, formerly called Gaillard Cut, is an artificial valley that cuts through the Continental Divide in Panama. The cut forms part of the Panama Canal, linking Gatun Lake, and thereby the Atlantic Ocean, to the Gulf of Panama and hence the Pacific Ocean. It is 12.6 kilometres (7.8 mi) from the Pedro Miguel lock on the Pacific side to the Chagres River arm of Lake Gatun, with a water level 26 metres (85 ft) above sea level.

Construction of the cut was one of the great engineering feats of its time; the immense effort required to complete it was justified by the great significance of the canal to shipping, and in particular the strategic interests of the United States of America.

Culebra is the name for the mountain ridge it cuts through, and was also originally applied to the cut itself. From 1915 to 2000 the cut was named Gaillard Cut after US Major David du Bose Gaillard, who had led the excavation. After the canal handover to Panama in 2000, the name was changed back to Culebra. In Spanish the cut is known as the Corte Culebra and is also called the Snake Cut.

== Construction ==
=== French work ===
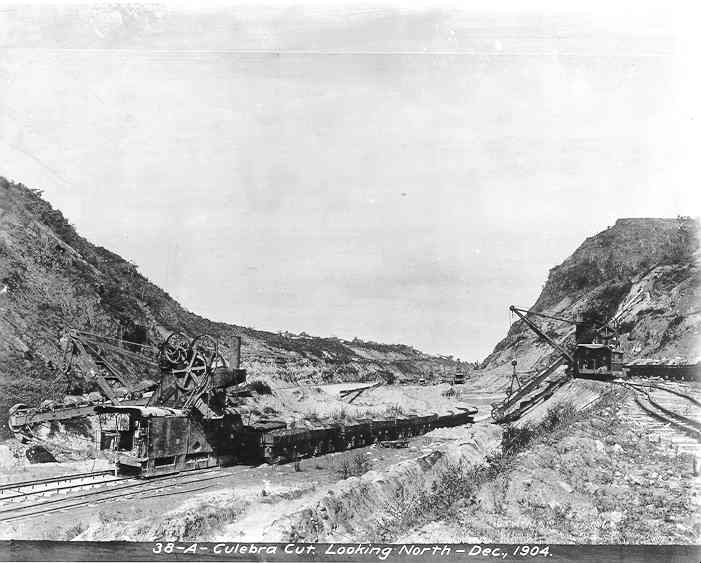
The Culebra Cut in December 1904, after the French handover

The excavation of the cut was begun by a French venture, led by Ferdinand de Lesseps, which was attempting to build a sea-level canal between the oceans, with a bottom width of 22 metres (72 feet). Digging at Culebra began on January 22, 1881. A combination of disease, underestimation of the problem, and financial difficulties led to the collapse of the French effort, which was bought out by the United States in 1904. The French had excavated some 14,256,000 cubic metres (18,646,000 cu yd) of material from the cut, and had lowered the summit from 64 metres (210 feet) above sea level to 59 metres (194 feet), over a relatively narrow width.

=== American work ===
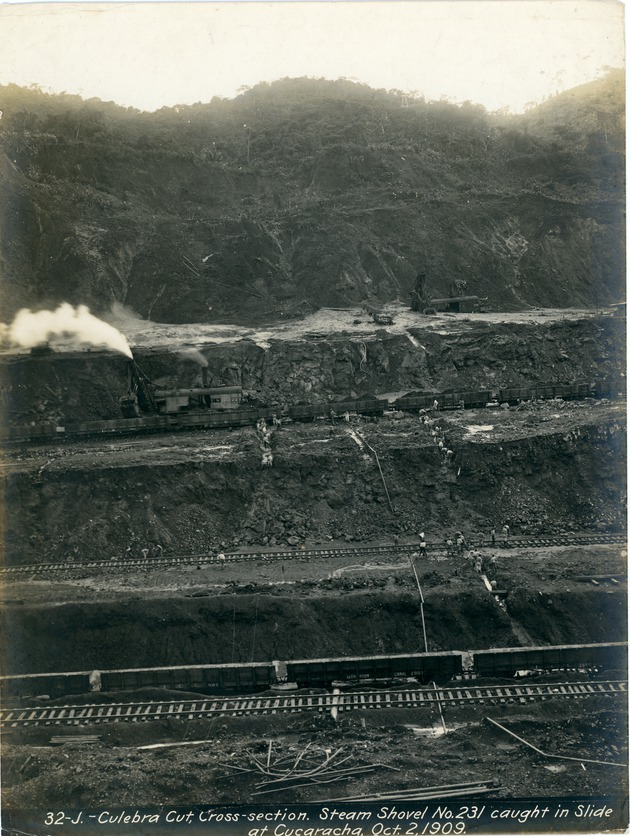
Culebra Cut Construction in 1909

The United States took over on May 4, 1904. Under the leadership of John F. Stevens, and later George Washington Goethals, the American effort started work on a cut that was wider but not as deep, as part of a new plan for an elevated lock canal, with a bottom width of 91 metres (299 ft); this would require creation of a valley up to 540 metres (0.34 mi) wide at the top. A vast amount of new earthmoving equipment was imported, and a comprehensive system of railways was constructed for the removal of the immense amounts of earthen and rocky spoil.

Major David du Bose Gaillard, of the U.S. Army Corps of Engineers, joined the project at the same time as Goethals, and he was put in charge of the central district of the canal, which was responsible for all of the work between Gatun Lake and the Pedro Miguel locks—most notably, the Culebra Cut. Gaillard brought dedication and quiet, clear-sighted leadership to his difficult, complex task.

The scale of the work was massive. Elaborate (multiple) air compressor facilities using some 50 kilometres (30 mi) of pipe powered hundreds of compressed air drills to bore holes for 200,000 kilograms (400,000 lb) of dynamite per month to blast and fragment the rock of the cut so that it could be excavated by steam shovels, most made by Bucyrus Foundry and Manufacturing Company of Milwaukee. Dozens of spoils trains took the spoil from the shovels to the landfill dumps, about 19 kilometres (12 mi) away. In a typical day, 160 trainloads of material were hauled away from a cut 14 kilometres (9 mi). This workload on the railroads required some skillful coordination. At the busiest times, there was a train going inbound or outbound almost every minute.

Six thousand men worked in the cut, drilling holes, placing explosives, controlling steam shovels, and running the dirt trains. They also moved and extended the railroad tracks as the work moved forward. Twice a day work stopped for blasting, and then the steam shovels were moved in to take the loose spoil (dirt and rock) away. More than 600 holes filled with dynamite were fired daily. In all, 27,000 metric tons (60 million pounds) of dynamite were used. In some locations, about 24 metric tons (52,000 lb) of dynamite were planted and detonated for a single blast.

=== Landslides ===
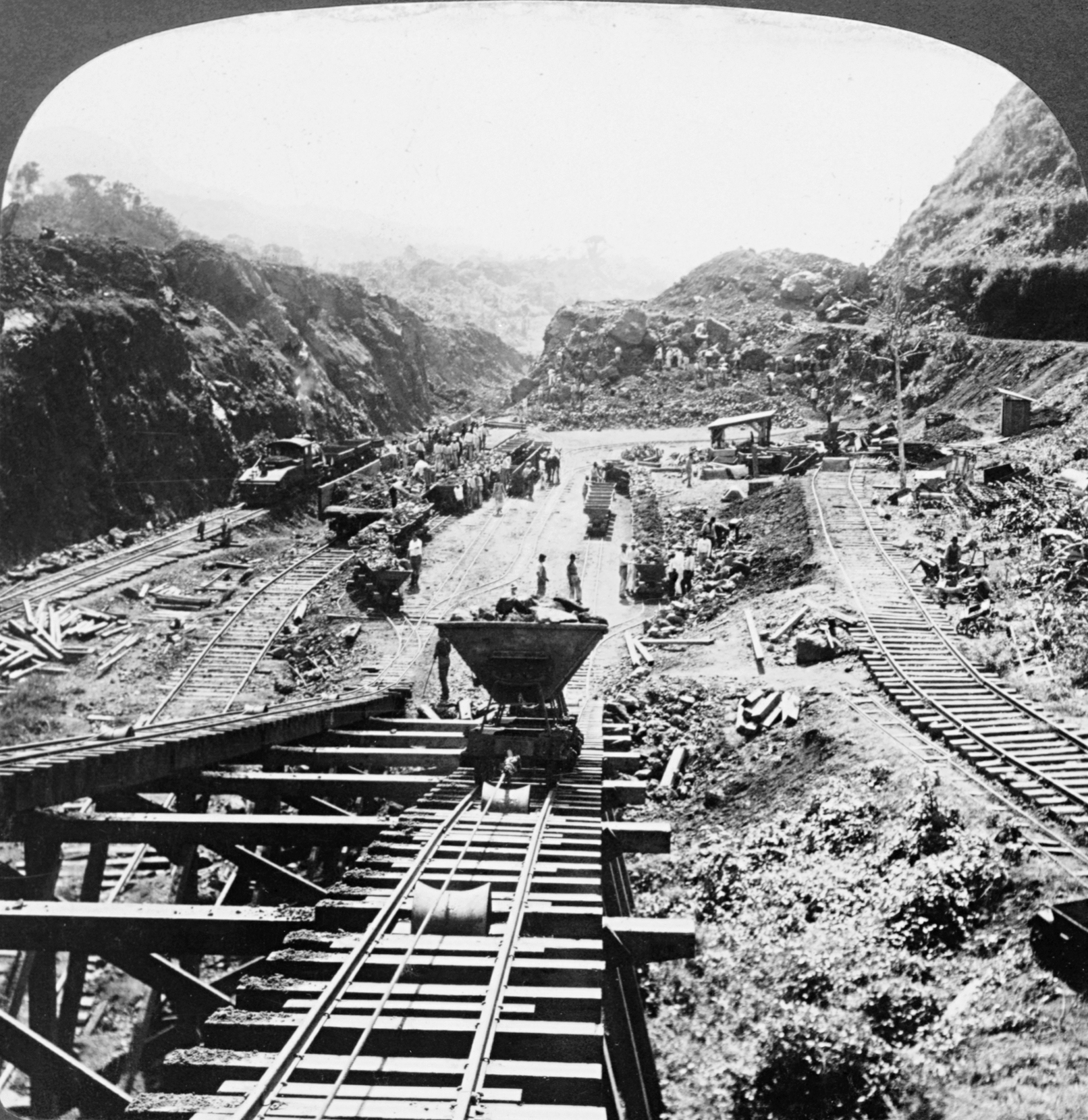
Construction under way in the Culebra Cut, 1907

The excavation of the cut was one of the greatest areas of uncertainty in the creation of the canal, due to the unpredicted large landslides. The International Board of Consulting Engineers had mistakenly decided that the rock would be stable at a height of 73.5 metres (241 ft) with a slope of 1 in 1.5; in practice, the rock began to collapse from that slope at a height of only 19.5 metres (64 ft). The misjudgment was in part due to unforeseen oxidation of the underlying iron strata due to water infiltration, which caused weakening and eventually a collapse of the strata. Strain softening of the underlying shale layers of sedimentary units caused continuation of sliding as the strength of the slide post-failure was reduced.

The first and largest major slide occurred in 1907 at Cucaracha. The initial crack was first noted on October 4, 1907, followed by the mass wasting of about 400,000 cubic metres (500,000 yd^{3}) of clay. This slide caused many people to suggest the construction of the Panama Canal would be impossible; Gaillard described the slides as tropical glaciers, made of mud instead of ice. The clay was too soft to be excavated by the steam shovels, and it was therefore largely removed by sluicing it with water from a high level.

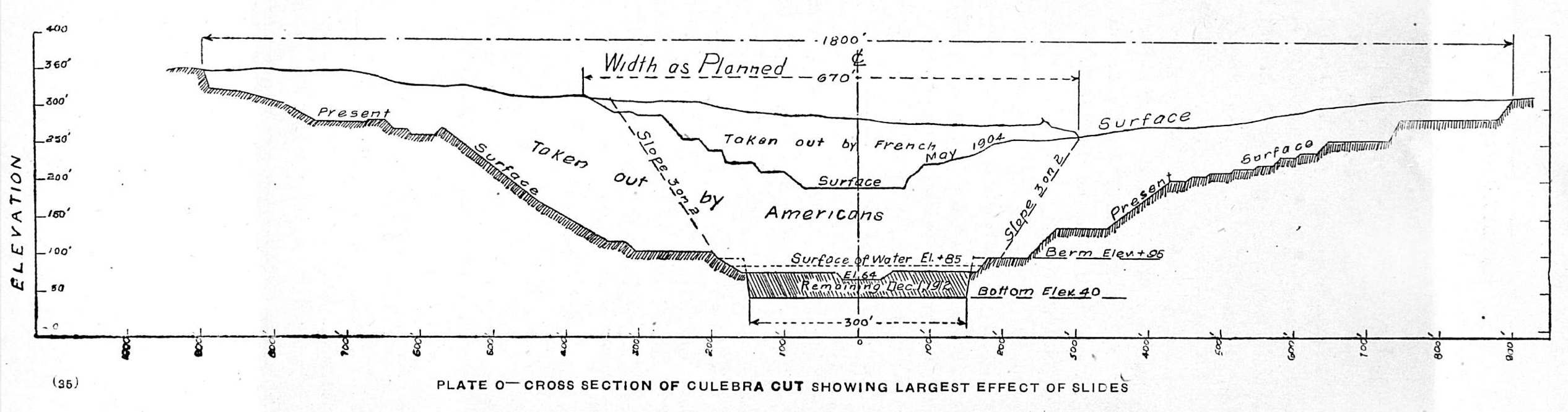
Cross section of Culebra Cut showing largest effect of slides

After this, the sediment in the upper levels of the cut were removed, resulting in less weight over the weak strata. Landslides continued to be a problem after the canal's opening, causing intermittent closures.

== Completion ==
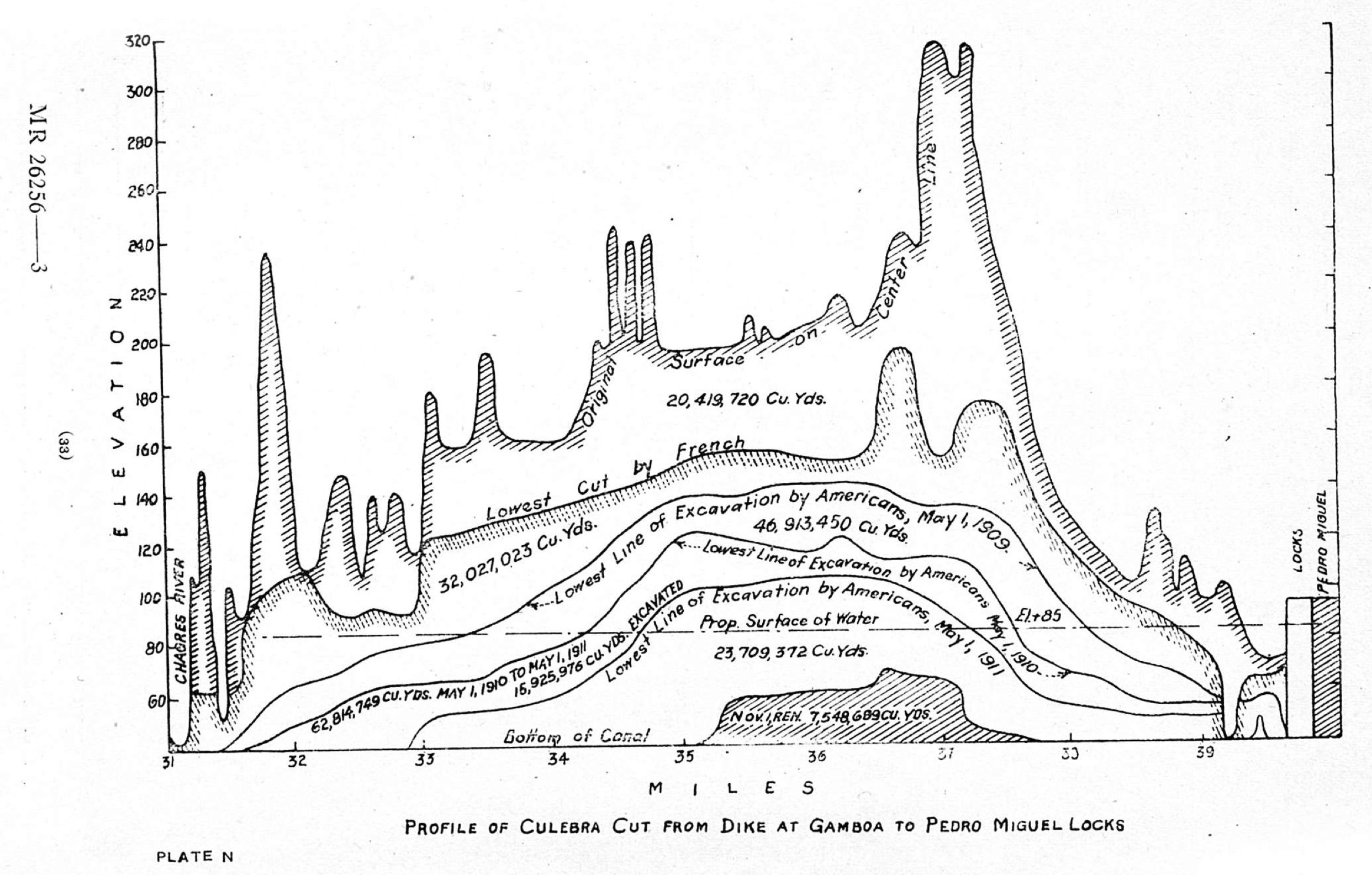
Profile of Culebra Cut from dam at Gamboa to Pedro Miguel Locks, showing successive levels of excavation

Steam shovels broke through the Culebra Cut on May 20, 1913. The Americans had lowered the summit of the cut from 59 to 12 metres (194 to 39 ft) above sea level, at the same time widening it considerably, and they had excavated over 76 million cubic metres (100 million cubic yards) of material. Some 23 million m^{3} (30 million cu yd) of this material was additional to the planned excavation, having been brought into the cut by the landslides.

Gaillard was promoted to colonel in 1913. One month later, on December 5, he died of a brain tumor in Baltimore, Maryland, and hence he did not live to see the opening of the canal in 1914. The Culebra Cut, as it was originally known, was renamed to the Gaillard Cut on April 27, 1915, in his honor. After the handing over of the canal to Panama in 2000, the old name Culebra Cut was reinstated.

== See also ==
- Postage stamps and postal history of the Canal Zone
- Earthworks (engineering)
