= USS S-11 =

S-class submarine of the United States

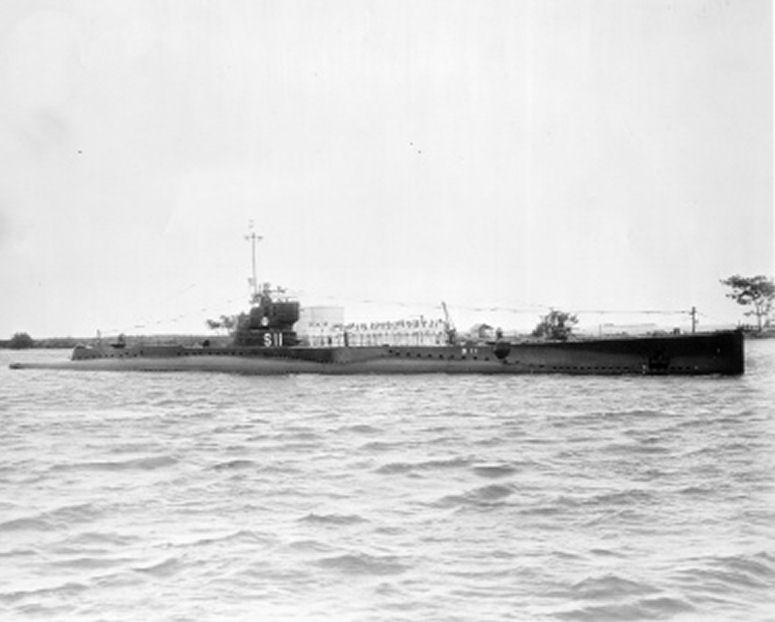
- USS S-11 (SS-116), September 1935, in the Panama Canal Zone

History

United States
- Name: S-11
- Builder: Portsmouth Navy Yard, on Seavey Island, Kittery, Maine
- Cost: $305,625.54 (hull and machinery)
- Laid down: 2 December 1919
- Launched: 7 February 1921
- Sponsored by: Miss Anna Eleanor Roosevelt
- Commissioned: 11 February 1923
- Decommissioned: 30 September 1936
- Recommissioned: 6 September 1940
- Decommissioned: 2 May 1945
- Stricken: 19 May 1945
- Identification: Hull symbol: SS-116; Call sign: NIMT
- Fate: Sold for scrapping, 28 October 1945

General characteristics
- Class & type: S-3-class submarine
- Displacement: 930 long tons (945 t) surfaced; 1,138 long tons (1,156 t) submerged
- Length: 231 feet (70 m)
- Beam: 21 ft 10 in (6.65 m)
- Draft: 13 ft 7 in (4.14 m)
- Installed power: 2,000 brake horsepower (1,491 kW) diesel; 1,200 hp (895 kW) electric
- Propulsion: 2 × MAN– New York Navy Yard, S6V45/42 diesel engines; 2 × Westinghouse Electric Corporation electric motors; 2 × 60-cell batteries; 2 × Propellers
- Speed: 14 knots (26 km/h; 16 mph) surfaced; 11 kn (20 km/h; 13 mph) submerged
- Range: 5,500 nautical miles (10,200 km; 6,300 mi) at 11 kn (20 km/h; 13 mph), 7,121 nmi (13,188 km; 8,195 mi) at 9.6 kn (17.8 km/h; 11.0 mph) if fuel loaded into the main ballast tanks
- Test depth: 200 ft (61 m)
- Capacity: 36,950 US gallons (139,900 L; 30,770 imp gal) fuel
- Complement: 4 officers; 34 enlisted
- Armament: 4 × Bow 21-inch (533 mm) torpedo tubes (12 torpedoes); 1 × Stern 21-in torpedo tube (2 torpedoes); 1 × 4-inch (102 mm)/50-caliber

USS S-11 (SS-116) was a part of the second-group of S-3-class, also referred to as a "Modified Government"-type, submarine of the United States Navy.

== Design ==
With lessons learned with the earlier boats, and studies on German U-boats, changes were incorporated into the remaining "Government"-type boats that had not been laid down yet. A stern mounted torpedo tube was added in the aft of the boat, along with the modified bow planes first tested on S-8 and S-9.

The "Modified Government"-type had a length of 231 feet (70.4 m) overall, a beam of 21 ft 10 in (6.7 m), and a mean draft of 13 ft 7 in (4.1 m). They displaced 930 long tons (940 t) on the surface and 1,138 long tons (1,156 t) submerged. All S-class submarines had a crew of 4 officers and 34 enlisted men, when first commissioned. They had a diving depth of 200 ft (61.0 m).

For surface running, the "Modified Government"-type were powered by two 1,000-brake-horsepower (746 kW) MAN S6V45/42 diesel engines built by the New York Navy Yard, each driving one propeller shaft. When submerged each propeller was driven by a 600-horsepower (447 kW) Westinghouse Electric Corporation electric motor. They could reach 14 knots (26 km/h; 16 mph) on the surface and 11 kn (20 km/h; 13 mph) underwater. On the surface, the modified S-3-class had a range of 5,500 nautical miles (10,200 km; 6,300 mi) at 11 kn (20 km/h; 13 mph), or 7,121 nmi (13,188 km; 8,195 mi) at 9.6 kn (17.8 km/h; 11.0 mph), if fuel was loaded into their main ballast tanks.

The boats were armed with four 21-inch (533 mm) torpedo tubes in the bow and one the stern. They carried 9 reloads, for a total of fourteen torpedoes. The "Modified Government"-type submarines were also armed with a single 4 in (100 mm)/50 caliber deck gun.

The Bureau of Construction & Repair (BuC&R) was given the job of correcting the "Government"-type's slow diving times. To accomplish this, starting with S-8 and S-9, they moved the bow planes below the water line and rigged them to be permanently in the out position. Due to the success of these modification, S-10 to S-13 and S-48 to S-51, would also be outfitted with the new planes.

== Construction ==
S-11's keel was laid down on 2 December 1919, by the Portsmouth Navy Yard in Kittery, Maine. She was launched on 7 February 1921, sponsored by Miss Anna Eleanor Roosevelt, daughter of former Assistant Secretary of the Navy and future President, Franklin D. Roosevelt, and commissioned on 11 January 1923, with future Vice Admiral, Lieutenant Wilder D. Baker in command.

== Service history ==
=== 1923–1936 ===
Supplementing duties along the coast of the Northeastern United States, S-11 visited Guantanamo Bay, Cuba, in 1923, and Saint Thomas, in the United States Virgin Islands, Trinidad, and Coco Solo, in the Panama Canal Zone, in 1924. Departing New London, Connecticut, on 29 September 1924, transiting the Panama Canal, and stopping in California, along the way, she visited Hawaii, from 27 April to 25 May 1925, before returning to New London, on 12 July 1925.

S-11 operated in the Panama Canal area, from January through April 1926, visited Kingston, Jamaica, from 20 March to 28 March 1927, and served again in the Panama Canal area, from February into April 1928. From 1929 until 1936, S-11 operated almost exclusively in the Panama Canal area, but was in Miami, Florida, on 31 March 1930, and visited Washington, D.C., from 15 May to 5 June 1933.

Departing Coco Solo, on 13 June 1936, S-11 arrived at the Philadelphia Navy Yard, on 22 June 1936. She was decommissioned there on 30 September 1936.

=== 1940–1945 ===
S-11 was recommissioned on 6 September 1940, at Philadelphia. After voyages from New London to Philadelphia, Bermuda, and St. Thomas, in 1941, S-11 arrived at the Coco Solo submarine base, in the Panama Canal Zone, on 5 October 1941, and was based there when the Japanese attack on Pearl Harbor brought the United States into World War II, on 7 December 1941. On 16 August 1942, a US Navy yard patrol boats mistakenly depth-charged her off Cape Mala, on Panama's Pacific coast, after they mistook her for a Japanese submarine. She suffered minor damage.

S-11 continued to serve in the Panama Canal area until June 1943, and next at Trinidad, until February 1944. Following overhaul in the Panama Canal area, she proceeded in July 1944, via Aruba to Trinidad, where she operated until October 1944. Arriving at Guantanamo Bay, on 26 October 1944, she served there until January 1945. After a voyage to the Panama Canal area, she departed the Panama Canal Zone, on 8 February 1945, and arrived at New London, on 24 February 1945, and at Philadelphia, on 28 March 1945.

== Fate ==
S-11 was decommissioned on 2 May 1945, at Philadelphia, and was struck from the Naval Vessel Register. She was sold on 28 October 1945, to Rosoff Brothers, of New York City, for scrapping. She later was resold to Northern Metals Company, of Philadelphia, before she was scrapped.

== Awards ==
- American Defense Service Medal
- American Campaign Medal
- World War II Victory Medal

== Bibliography ==
- "Table 21 - Ships on Navy List June 30, 1919". Congressional Serial Set. U.S. Government Printing Office: 770. 1921.
- Friedman, Norman (1995). U.S. Submarines Through 1945: An Illustrated Design History. Annapolis, Maryland: Naval Institute Press. ISBN 1-55750-263-3.
- Mohl, Michael. "S-11 (SS-116)". Navsource.net.
- Hall, Anne Martin (1925). Ships of the United States navy and their sponsors, 1913-1923.
- "S-11". Dictionary of American Naval Fighting Ships. Navy Department, Naval History and Heritage Command. 1 September 2015. This article incorporates text from this source, which is in the public domain.
- Hedman, Ric; Johnston, David (21 October 2025). "S-10 through S-13". PigBoats.com.
- Hedman, Ric; Johnston, David (21 October 2025a). "S-3 through S-9". PigBoats.com.
- Hinman, Charles R.; Campbell, Douglas E. (2019). The Submarine Has No Friends: Friendly Fire Incidents Involving U.S. Submarines During World War II. Syneca Research Group, Inc. ISBN 978-0-359-76906-3.
