= USS S-12 =

S-class submarine of the United States

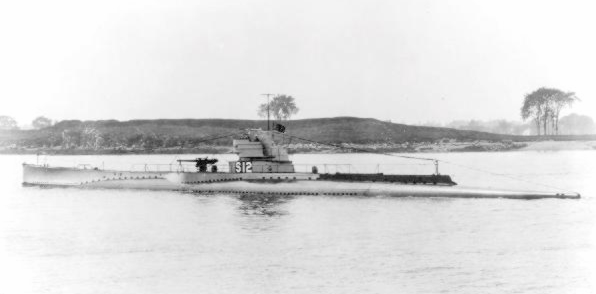
- USS S-12 (SS-117), leaving the Portsmouth Navy Yard, Kittery, Maine, 4 June 1923

History

United States
- Name: S-12
- Builder: Portsmouth Navy Yard, on Seavey Island, Kittery, Maine
- Cost: $304,099.51 (hull and machinery)
- Laid down: 8 January 1920
- Launched: 4 August 1921
- Sponsored by: Mrs. Charlotte Woodbury
- Commissioned: 30 April 1923
- Decommissioned: 30 September 1936
- Recommissioned: 4 November 1940
- Decommissioned: 18 May 1945
- Stricken: 19 May 1945
- Identification: Hull symbol: SS-117; Call sign: NIMV
- Fate: Sold for scrapping, 28 October 1945

General characteristics
- Class & type: S-3-class submarine
- Displacement: 930 long tons (945 t) surfaced; 1,138 long tons (1,156 t) submerged
- Length: 231 feet (70 m)
- Beam: 21 ft 10 in (6.65 m)
- Draft: 13 ft 7 in (4.14 m)
- Installed power: 2,000 brake horsepower (1,491 kW) diesel; 1,200 hp (895 kW) electric
- Propulsion: 2 × MAN– New York Navy Yard, S6V45/42 diesel engines; 2 × Westinghouse Electric Corporation electric motors; 2 × 60-cell batteries; 2 × Propellers
- Speed: 14 knots (26 km/h; 16 mph) surfaced; 11 kn (20 km/h; 13 mph) submerged
- Range: 5,500 nautical miles (10,200 km; 6,300 mi) at 11 kn (20 km/h; 13 mph), 7,121 nmi (13,188 km; 8,195 mi) at 9.6 kn (17.8 km/h; 11.0 mph) if fuel loaded into the main ballast tanks
- Test depth: 200 ft (61 m)
- Capacity: 36,950 US gallons (139,900 L; 30,770 imp gal) fuel
- Complement: 4 officers; 34 enlisted
- Armament: 4 × Bow 21-inch (533 mm) torpedo tubes (12 torpedoes); 1 × Stern 21-in torpedo tube (2 torpedoes); 1 × 4-inch (102 mm)/50-caliber

USS S-12 (SS-117) was a part of the second-group of S-3-class, also referred to as a "Modified Government"-type, submarine of the United States Navy.

== Design ==
With lessons learned with the earlier boats, and studies on German U-boats, changes were incorporated into the remaining "Government"-type boats that had not been laid down yet. A stern mounted torpedo tube was added in the aft of the boat, along with the modified bow planes first tested on S-8 and S-9.

The "Modified Government"-type had a length of 231 feet (70.4 m) overall, a beam of 21 ft 10 in (6.7 m), and a mean draft of 13 ft 7 in (4.1 m). They displaced 930 long tons (940 t) on the surface and 1,138 long tons (1,156 t) submerged. All S-class submarines had a crew of 4 officers and 34 enlisted men, when first commissioned. They had a diving depth of 200 ft (61.0 m).

For surface running, the "Modified Government"-type were powered by two 1,000-brake-horsepower (746 kW) MAN S6V45/42 diesel engines built by the New York Navy Yard, each driving one propeller shaft. When submerged each propeller was driven by a 600-horsepower (447 kW) Westinghouse Electric Corporation electric motor. They could reach 14 knots (26 km/h; 16 mph) on the surface and 11 kn (20 km/h; 13 mph) underwater. On the surface, the modified S-3-class had a range of 5,500 nautical miles (10,200 km; 6,300 mi) at 11 kn (20 km/h; 13 mph), or 7,121 nmi (13,188 km; 8,195 mi) at 9.6 kn (17.8 km/h; 11.0 mph), if fuel was loaded into their main ballast tanks.

The boats were armed with four 21-inch (533 mm) torpedo tubes in the bow and one the stern. They carried 9 reloads, for a total of fourteen torpedoes. The "Modified Government"-type submarines were also armed with a single 4 in (100 mm)/50 caliber deck gun.

The Bureau of Construction & Repair (BuC&R) was given the job of correcting the "Government"-type's slow diving times. To accomplish this, starting with S-8 and S-9, they moved the bow planes below the water line and rigged them to be permanently in the out position. Due to the success of these modification, S-10 to S-13 and S-48 to S-51, would also be outfitted with the new planes.

== Construction ==
S-12's keel was laid down on 8 January 1920, by the Portsmouth Navy Yard, in Kittery, Maine. She was launched on 4 August 1921, sponsored by Mrs. Charlotte Woodbury, wife of the former Assistant Secretary of the Navy, Gordon Woodbury, and commissioned on 30 April 1923, with future Admiral, Lieutenant Francis S. Low, in command.

== Service history ==
=== 1923–1936 ===
Following duty along the northeast coast in 1923, and a visit to Guantánamo Bay, Cuba, from 19 April to 24 April 1924, S-12 resumed duty in New England waters. Sailing from New London, Connecticut, on 15 November 1924, via the Panama Canal and California, she visited Hawaii from 24 April to 25 May 1925, before returning to New London, on 12 July.

In addition to service in the northeast through 1928, S-12 operated in the Panama Canal area, from January through April 1926; visited Kingston, Jamaica, from 20 March to 28 March 1927; and served again in the Panama Canal area, from February into April 1928. From 1929 into 1936, S-12 served almost exclusively in the Panama Canal area, although she visited Baltimore, Maryland, from 15 May to 5 June 1933, and New London, from 15 May to 1 June 1935.

Departing Coco Solo, on 13 June 1936, S-12 decommissioned at the Philadelphia Navy Yard, on 30 September 1936.

=== 1940–1945 ===
S-12 was recommissioned on 4 November 1940. Following voyages to Bermuda, Saint Thomas, US Virgin Islands, and Coco Solo, S-12 operated at St. Thomas, from December 1941 into March 1942; in the Panama Canal area, from April into June; at Guantánamo, from June into December; in the Panama Canal area, from that December 1943 into May 1944; at Trinidad, from May into July; and at Guantánamo, from July into 1945.

== Fate ==
Departing from Guantánamo, on 25 March, S-12 was decommissioned on 18 May 1945, at Philadelphia, and was struck from the Naval Vessel Register. She was sold on 28 October that year, to Rosoff Brothers, of New York City. Resold to Northern Metals Company, of Philadelphia, on an unspecified date, she was scrapped.

== Awards ==
- American Defense Service Medal
- American Campaign Medal
- World War II Victory Medal

== Bibliography ==
- "Table 21 - Ships on Navy List June 30, 1919". Congressional Serial Set. U.S. Government Printing Office: 770. 1921.
- Friedman, Norman (1995). U.S. Submarines Through 1945: An Illustrated Design History. Annapolis, Maryland: Naval Institute Press. ISBN 1-55750-263-3.
- Priolo, Gary. "S-12 (SS-117)". Navsource.net.
- Hall, Anne Martin (1925). Ships of the United States navy and their sponsors, 1913-1923.
- "S-12". Dictionary of American Naval Fighting Ships. Navy Department, Naval History and Heritage Command. 1 September 2015. This article incorporates text from this source, which is in the public domain.
- Hedman, Ric; Johnston, David (21 October 2025). "S-10 through S-13". PigBoats.com.
- Hedman, Ric; Johnston, David (21 October 2025a). "S-3 through S-9". PigBoats.com.
