= Francis Low =

Francis Low may refer to:

- Francis E. Low (1921–2007), American theoretical physicist
- Francis S. Low, United States Navy admiral
