= Wilder D. Baker =

American Vice admiral

Wilder DuPuy Baker
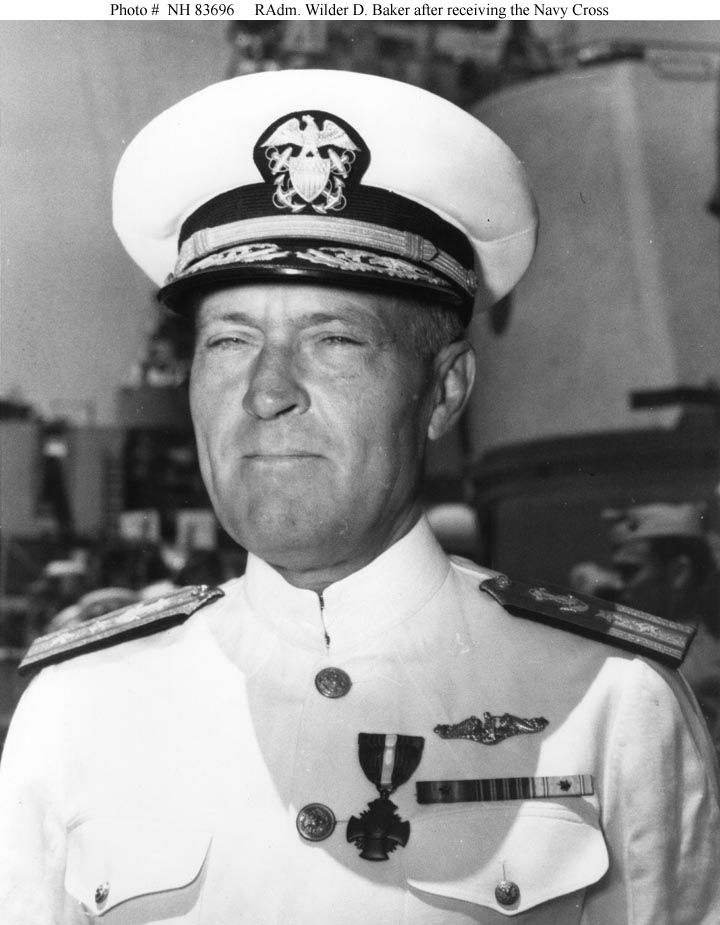
- Born: July 22, 1890; Topeka, Kansas, US
- Died: November 10, 1975 (aged 85); San Diego, California, US
- Relatives: Floyd Perry Baker (grandfather); Harold G. Bowen Jr. (son-in-law)
- Military career
- Allegiance: United States
- Branch: United States Navy
- Service years: 1914–1952
- Rank: Vice admiral
- Service number: 0-8703
- Commands: Western Sea Frontier; Eleventh Naval District; USS North Carolina; USS S-13; USS S-11; USS Kidder
- Conflicts: World War I World War II: Guadalcanal campaign; Aleutian Islands campaign; Palau Islands campaign; Philippines campaign; Battle of Okinawa
- Awards: Navy Cross; Silver Star; Legion of Merit; Bronze Star Medal

Wilder DuPuy Baker (July 22, 1890 – November 10, 1975) was a highly decorated officer in the United States Navy with the rank of Vice admiral. A Naval Academy graduate, Baker commanded submarines and destroyers in his early career and rose to the Flag rank following the United States entry into World War II. He subsequently commanded Task Force 94 during the first surface bombardment of the Japanese home islands and led the first offensive operations into the Sea of Okhotsk. Baker was decorated with a Navy Cross for this actions.

He later served as Commander Service Force, Atlantic Fleet and completed his career as Commandant, Eleventh Naval District with additional duty as Commander, Naval Base San Diego and Commander Southern California Sector, Western Sea Frontier in August 1952.

== Early career ==
Wilder DuPuy Baker was born on July 22, 1890, in Topeka, Kansas, as a son of local newspaperman, Isaac Newcomb Baker, and grandson of Topeka editor Floyd Perry Baker. Following graduation from Eastern High School in Bay City, Michigan in summer 1910, Baker received an appointment to the United States Naval Academy at Annapolis, Maryland. During his time at the Academy, he was active in the soccer team and was nicknamed "Bake".

Among his classmates were many future admirals during World War II, including John H. Brown Jr., William K. Harrill, Joseph R. Redman, Robert W. Cary Jr., John B. W. Waller, Carleton F. Bryant, Richard L. Conolly, Oliver Kessing, Frank L. Lowe, Edward L. Cochrane, Ralph O. Davis and Edward Ellsberg.

Baker graduated with Bachelor of Science degree on June 5, 1914 and was commissioned Ensign on that date. Upon the graduation, he consecutively served aboard USS Florida, USS Jason and USS North Carolina and took part in the operations in the Syrian waters.

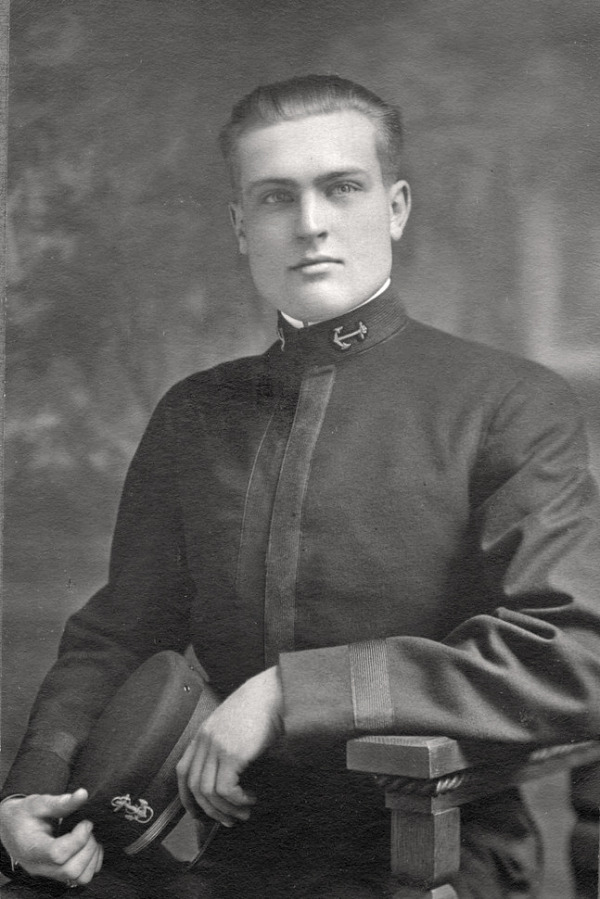
Baker as Midshipman while at the Naval Academy.

In June 1915, Baker returned to the United States and after a brief service aboard gunboat USS Dubuque, he entered the submarine instruction at the Submarine School in New London, Connecticut. He completed the instruction aboard the submarine tender USS Fulton and subsequently assumed duty in connection with fitting out of the submarine USS F-1. Baker was transferred to submarine USS L-11 in October 1917 and embarked for European waters two months later.

Baker participated in the submarine patrols in Irish Waters and was promoted consecutively to lieutenant junior grade and Lieutenant during his World War I service. He returned to the United States in February 1919 and assumed command of submarine USS L-3, which he operated along the East Coast, performing experiments and developing submarine warfare tactics.

In March 1920, Baker assumed duty as Engineer and Repair Officer of Submarine Division 5 and remained in that assignment until July 1922, when he assumed command of newly commissioned submarine USS S-11 at Portsmouth Navy Yard. He commanded his submarine to Guantanamo Bay, Cuba; Coco Solo, Panama Canal Zone; Saint Thomas, United States Virgin Islands, and Trinidad and returned to the United States in May 1924.

Baker then served for a year at Portsmouth Navy Yard, before he returned to sea for duty as Executive officer of destroyer USS Marcus in October 1925. He took part in the patrol cruises with the Pacific Fleet and was appointed commanding officer of destroyer USS Kidder in August 1926. Baker spent two years in this capacity and was transferred to the Division of Fleet Training in the Office of the Chief of Naval Operations under Admiral Charles F. Hughes.

In July 1930, Baker was attached to the battleship USS Wyoming and served as Gunnery officer of that ship until May 1933. He was subsequently ordered to the Naval War College at Newport, Rhode Island and completed junior course in May 1934. Baker then served for more a year with the General Board of the Navy in Washington, D.C., before he was ordered to London, England for duty as Assistant Naval Attaché at the American Embassy there in October 1935. During his time in this capacity, Baker took part in the observation tour in Africa during Second Italo-Ethiopian War.

Following his return stateside in March 1936, Baker assumed duty as Aide and Flag Secretary to the Commander, Special Service Squadron under Rear admiral Yancey S. Williams. He remained in that assignment until August that year, when he was appointed Commander, Destroyer Division 7, and from June 1937 to May 1938, Baker commanded Destroyer Division 22.

Baker was detached from sea duty in May 1938 and appointed Professor of Naval Science and Tactics at Yale University in New Haven, Connecticut. He served there until June 1940, when he returned to sea as Commander, Destroyer Squadron 31, which participated in the escort convoy duties in the Atlantic Ocean. One of the ships under his command was destroyer USS Reuben James, which was the first U.S. Navy ship sunk by hostile action.

== World War II ==
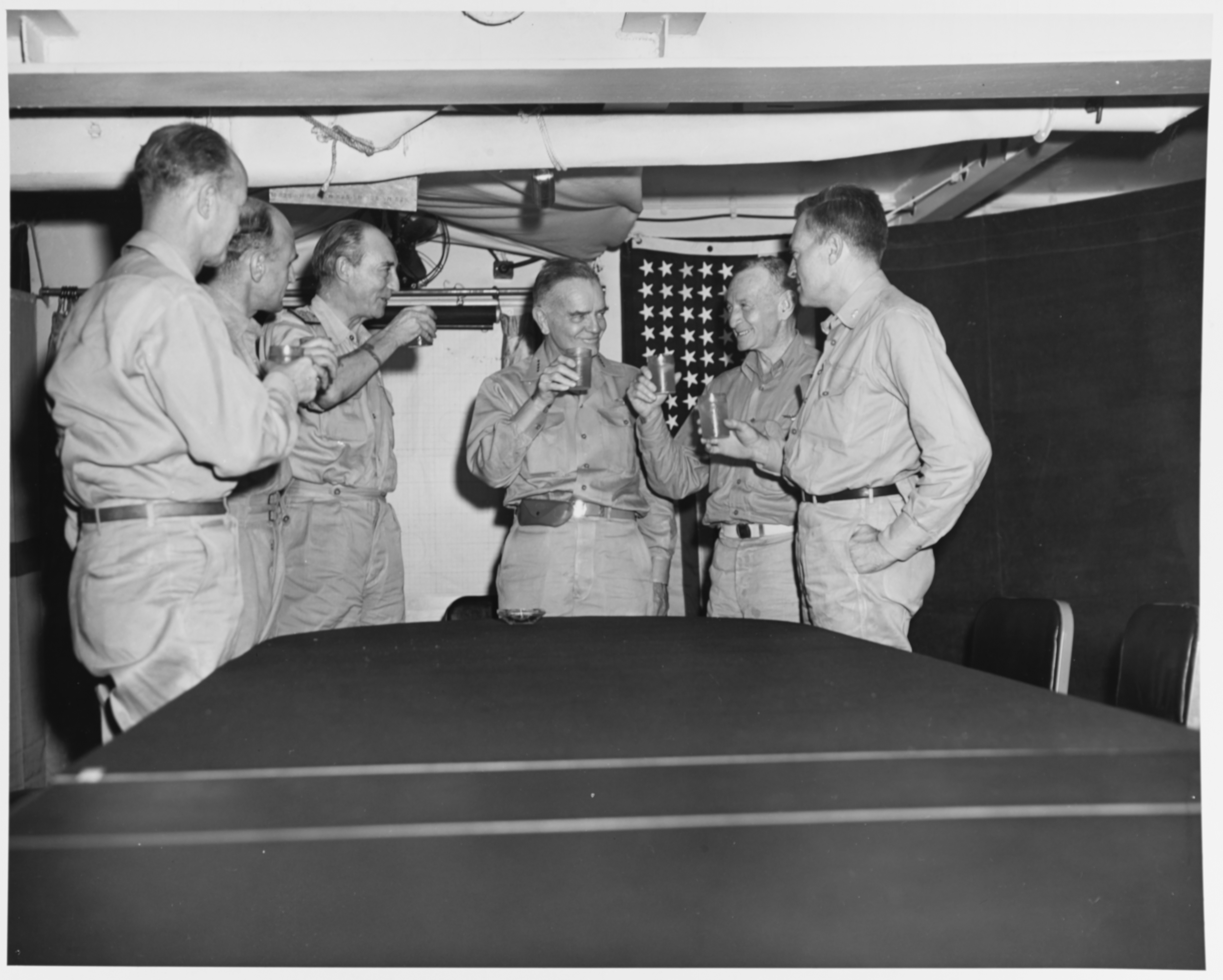
Celebration of Surrender of Japan on August 22, 1945. From left to right: Rear admiral Robert B. Carney; Captain J.P.L. Reid, RN; Admiral Bernard Rawlings, RN; Admiral William Halsey Jr.; Vice admiral John S. McCain Sr.; and Baker.

Following the United States entry into World War II, Baker served briefly Anti-Submarine Warfare officer on the staff of Commander-in-Chief, Atlantic Fleet under Admiral Royal E. Ingersoll in March 1942. He also held additional duty as Commander of Fleet's Anti-Submarine Unit. Baker was ordered to Washington, D.C. in May that year and joined the headquarters, United States Fleet under Admiral Ernest J. King also as Anti-Submarine Warfare Officer.

While in Washington, Baker became involved in the development of operational research. He cooperated with the Anti-Submarine Warfare Operations Group from the Columbia University and after persuading by future Nobel Prize laureate, William Shockley, then a research director of the group. Shockley successfully persuaded Baker to arrange for them to go on patrols with the antisubmarine forces so they could see for themselves what was taking place. Baker subsequently recommended a greater centralization of the training and direction of antisubmarine forces.

In December 1942, Baker was ordered to South Pacific and assumed duty as Commanding officer of the battleship, USS North Carolina. He led the ship during patrols near Guadalcanal, Solomon Islands and returned with ship to Hawaii in March 1943. While there, Baker was promoted to Rear admiral on May 27, 1943. He was subsequently appointed Commander Cruiser Division ONE with additional duty as Commander, Task Force NINETY-FOUR (TF-94) and led his command during the Aleutian Islands campaign and later operated his forces under adverse weather conditions, conducting the first surface bombardment of the Japanese home islands and led the first offensive operations into the Sea of Okhotsk. For his service during that operations, Baker was decorated with the Navy Cross, the United States military's second-highest decoration awarded for valor in combat.

Baker was appointed Commander, Cruiser Division 14 and remained in that capacity until July that year, when he assumed duty as Chief of Staff and Aide to Commander, Second Fast Carrier Task Force, Pacific Fleet under Vice admiral John "Slew" McCain. While in this command, he participated in the operations at Palau Islands, the Philippines, and Ryukyu Islands and together with Captain "Jimmy" Thach, McCain's operations officer, he devised tactics for using picket destroyers with combat air patrols to defend against kamikaze attacks.

In early August, Baker also presided the Court Martial of Captain Charles B. McVay III who was accused of culpable inefficiency in the performance of his duty and the negligently endangering the lives of others due the sinking of cruiser Indianapolis which was torpedoed by Imperial Japanese Navy submarine on July 30, 1945.

He was present aboard battleship USS Missouri during the Japanese Surrender Ceremony in Tokyo Bay on September 2, 1945. For his service under Admiral McCain, Baker was decorated with Silver Star, Legion of Merit with Combat "V" and Bronze Star Medal with Combat "V".

== Postwar service ==
Following the sudden death of admiral McCain on September 6, 1945, only four days after Japanese surrender, Baker continued as Chief of Staff under new commander, Admiral John H. Towers. He participated in the occupation of Japan until October 1945, when he was ordered back to the United States. Following a brief leave home and temporary duty with the Bureau of Naval Personnel, Baker was ordered to Boston, where assumed duty as Commandant of the local Naval Base.

He remained in that capacity until June 1947, when he assumed duty as Commander Service Force, Atlantic Fleet under Admiral William H. P. Blandy. Baker remained in Norfolk until February 1949, when he was ordered to San Diego, California for duty as Commandant, Eleventh Naval District with additional duty as Commander, Naval Base San Diego and Commander Southern California Sector, Western Sea Frontier.

While in this capacity, Baker was decorated with Brazilian Order of Naval Merit, rank Commander and Mexican Military Merit, 1st Class. He retired on August 1, 1952 after 42 years of active duty and was advanced to the rank of Vice admiral on the retired list for having been specially commended in combat.

== Retirement ==
Upon his retirement from the Navy, Baker embarked with his wife Cora for three-month trip to Europe and after his return stateside, he worked as Head of Public relations Department of the Solar Aircraft Company in San Diego, California. He was also a companion of the Naval Order of the United States (insignia number 3022).

Vice admiral Wilder D. Baker died on November 10, 1975, aged 85, in San Diego. He was married three times, first to Constance Metcalf with whom he had his first born and only daughter Constance Baker, who married future Vice admiral Harold G. Bowen Jr. Following his first wife's early death, he married Cora Barry, daughter of David Sheldon Barry, US Senate Sergeant at Arms and Cora Bonney, with whom he had a son Wilder D. Baker Jr., a graduate of Yale University and Phillips Academy. Following the death of Cora he married for the third time in 1971 to Joyce Read.

From 1956-1958 he served as Chairman of the Board of the San Diego Symphony Orchestra Association.

== Decorations ==
Here is the ribbon bar of Vice admiral Wilder D. Baker:

Submarine Warfare insignia
1st Row	Navy Cross		Silver Star
2nd Row	Legion of Merit with Combat "V"	Bronze Star Medal with Combat "V"	Navy Presidential Unit Citation with one star
3rd Row	Navy Unit Citation with one star	World War I Victory Medal with Submarine Clasp	Second Nicaraguan Campaign Medal
4th Row	American Defense Service Medal with "A" Device	American Campaign Medal	Asiatic-Pacific Campaign Medal with one silver and two bronze 3/16" service stars
5th Row	World War II Victory Medal	Navy Occupation Service Medal	National Defense Service Medal
6th Row	Philippine Liberation Medal with two stars	Brazilian Order of Naval Merit, rank Commander	Mexican Military Merit, 1st Class
