= USS Alaska (CB-1) =

Lead ship of the US Navy Alaska class of large cruisers

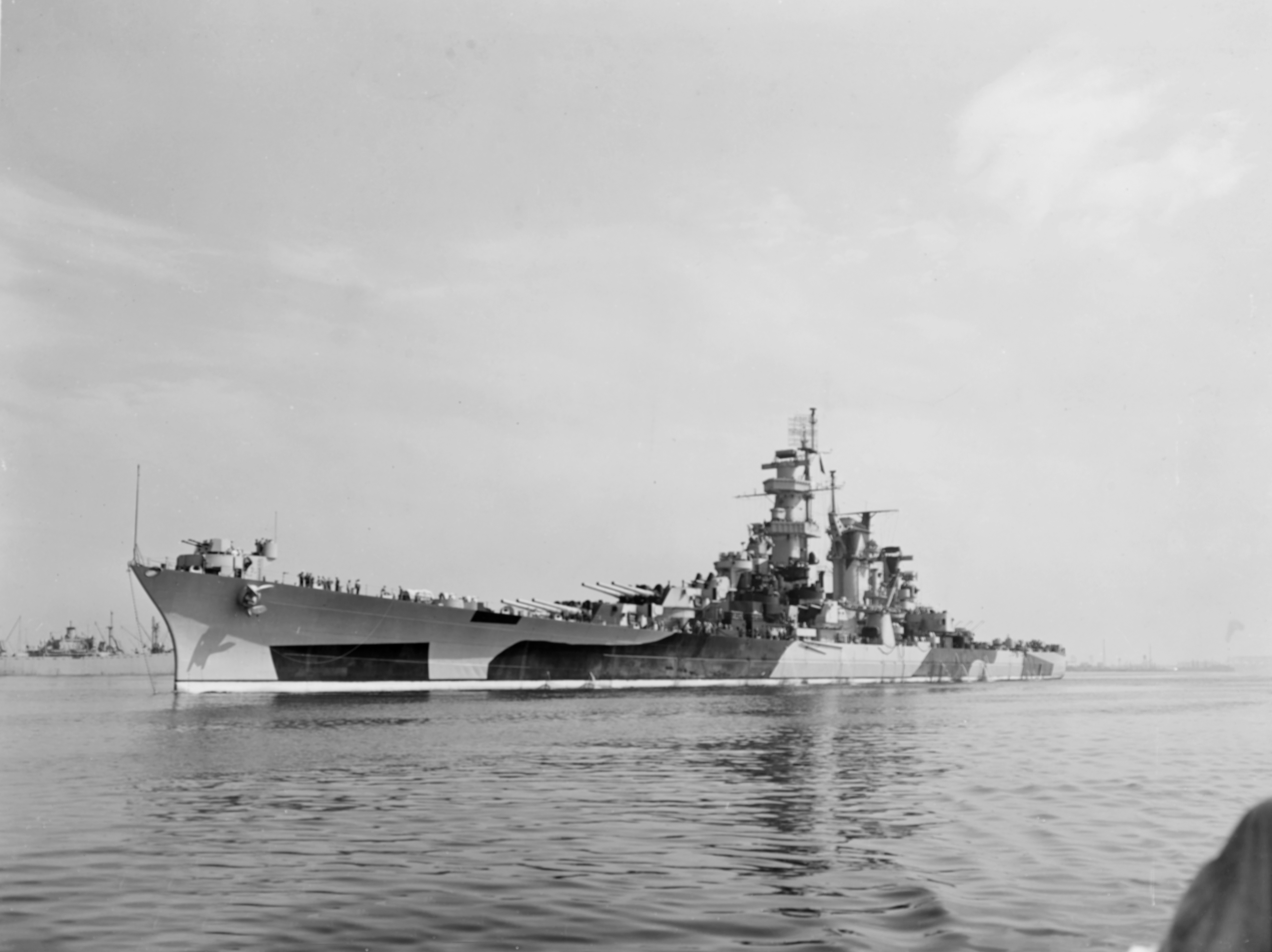
- USS Alaska

History

United States
- Name: USS Alaska
- Namesake: Territory of Alaska
- Ordered: 9 September 1940
- Builder: New York Shipbuilding Corporation
- Laid down: 17 December 1941
- Launched: 15 August 1943
- Commissioned: 17 June 1944
- Decommissioned: 17 February 1947
- Stricken: 1 June 1960
- Honors and awards: Three battle stars for World War II service
- Fate: Scrapped in 1960

General characteristics
- Class & type: Alaska-class large cruiser
- Displacement: Standard: 29,779 long tons (30,257 t); Full load: 34,253 long tons (34,803 t)
- Length: 808 ft 6 in (246.4 m)
- Beam: 91 ft 1 in (27.8 m)
- Draft: 31 ft 10 in (9.7 m)
- Installed power: 8 × Babcock & Wilcox water-tube boilers; 153,000 shp (114,000 kW)
- Propulsion: 4 × General Electric steam turbines; 4 × screw propellers
- Speed: 33 knots (61 km/h; 38 mph)
- Range: 12,000 nmi (22,000 km; 14,000 mi) at 15 knots (28 km/h; 17 mph)
- Crew: 1,517
- Armament: 9 × 12 in (305 mm) guns; 12 × 5 in (127 mm) dual-purpose guns; 56 × 40 mm (1.6 in) guns; 34 × 20 mm (0.79 in) guns
- Armor: Belt: 9 in (229 mm); Deck: 4 in (102 mm); Conning tower: 10.6 in (270 mm); Turrets: 12.8 in (325 mm)
- Aircraft carried: 4

USS Alaska was the lead ship of the Alaska-class "large cruisers" which served with the United States Navy during the end of World War II. She was the first of two ships of her class to be completed, followed only by Guam; four other ships were ordered but were not completed before the end of the war. Alaska was the third vessel of the US Navy to be named after what was then the territory of Alaska, and was assigned the hull number CB-1. She was laid down on 17 December 1941, ten days after the United States entered the war, was launched in August 1943 by the New York Shipbuilding Corporation, in Camden, New Jersey, and was commissioned in June 1944. She was armed with a main battery of nine 12 in (305 mm) guns in three triple turrets and had a top speed of 33 kn (61 km/h; 38 mph).

Due to being commissioned late in the war, Alaska saw relatively limited service. She participated in operations off Iwo Jima and Okinawa in February–July 1945, including providing anti-aircraft defense for various carrier task forces and conducting limited shore bombardment operations. She shot down several Japanese aircraft off Okinawa, including a possible Ohka piloted missile. In July–August 1945 she participated in sweeps for Japanese shipping in the East China and Yellow Seas. After the war, she assisted in the occupation of Korea and transported a contingent of US Army troops back to the United States. She was decommissioned in February 1947 and placed in reserve, where she remained until she was stricken in 1960 and sold for scrapping the following year.

== Design ==
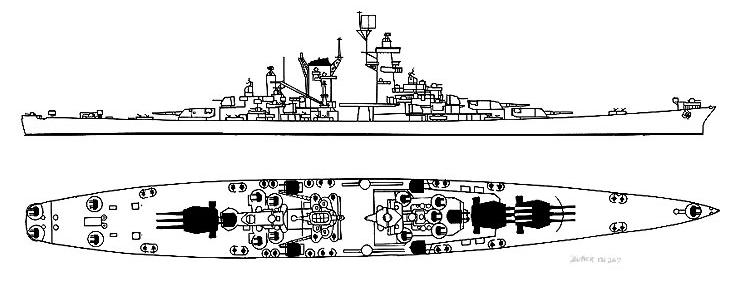
Recognition drawing of the Alaska class

Alaska was 808 feet 6 inches (246.43 m) long overall and had a beam of 91 ft 1 in (27.76 m) and a draft of 31 ft 10 in (9.70 m). She displaced 29,779 long tons (30,257 t) as designed and up to 34,253 long tons (34,803 t) at full load. The ship had a flush deck with a flared bow and a rounded cruiser stern. She had a large superstructure that included an armored conning tower with a tall tower mast, along with a smaller, secondary conning position further aft. She carried four OS2U Kingfisher or SC Seahawk floatplanes, with a pair of catapults mounted amidships.

The ship was powered by four sets of General Electric geared steam turbines, each driving a screw propeller. Steam for the turbines was generated by eight oil-fired Babcock & Wilcox water-tube boilers, which were vented through a large funnel located amidships. The propulsion system was rated to produce 150,000 shaft horsepower (110,000 kW), generating a top speed of 33 knots (61 km/h; 38 mph). The ship had a cruising range of 12,000 nautical miles (22,000 km; 14,000 mi) at a speed of 15 kn (28 km/h; 17 mph).

The ship was armed with a main battery of nine 12 in (305 mm) L/50 Mark 8 guns in three triple gun turrets, two in a superfiring pair forward and one aft of the superstructure. (Note: L/50 refers to the length of the gun in terms of calibers. An L/50 gun is 50 times long as it is in bore diameter.) The secondary battery consisted of twelve 5 in (127 mm) L/38 dual-purpose guns in six twin turrets. Two were placed on the centerline superfiring over the main battery turrets, fore and aft, and the remaining four turrets were placed on the corners of the superstructure. The light anti-aircraft battery consisted of 56 quad-mounted 40 mm (1.6 in) Bofors guns and 34 single-mounted 20 mm (0.79 in) Oerlikon guns. A pair of Mk 38 gun directors aided gun laying for the main battery, while two Mk 37 directors controlled the 5-inch guns and a Mk 57 director aided the 40 mm guns.

The main armor belt was 9 inches (229 mm) thick in the central portion of the hull, where it protected the propulsion machinery spaces and the ammunition magazines, thinning to 5 inches at either end. The main armor deck was 4 in (102 mm) thick. Her conning tower received 10.6 inches (270 mm) of armor plate on the sides. The gun turrets had 12.8-inch (325 mm) thick faces.

== Service history ==
Alaska was authorized under the Fleet Expansion Act on 19 July 1940, and ordered on 9 September. On 17 December 1941 she was laid down at New York Shipbuilding in Camden, New Jersey. She was launched on 15 August 1943, sponsored by Dorothy Smith Gruening, the wife of Governor Ernest Gruening of Alaska, after which fitting-out work was effected. The ship was completed by June 1944, and was commissioned into the US Navy on 17 June, under the command of Captain Peter K. Fischler.

=== World War II ===
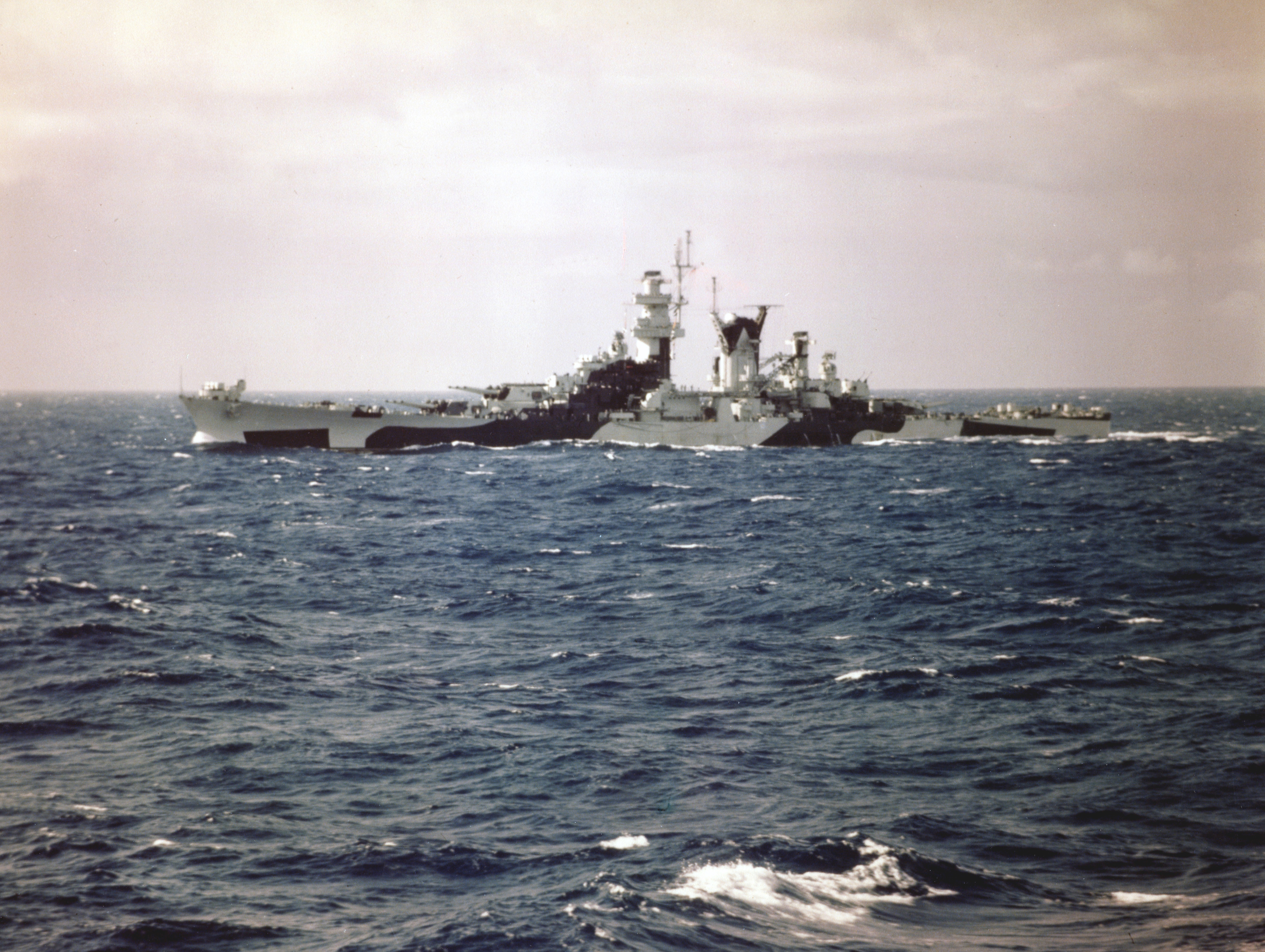
Alaska on her shakedown cruise in August 1944

After her commissioning, Alaska steamed down to Hampton Roads, escorted by the destroyers Simpson and Broome. The ship was then deployed for a shakedown cruise, first in the Chesapeake Bay and then into the Caribbean, off Trinidad. On the cruise, she was escorted by the destroyers Bainbridge and Decatur. After completing the cruise, Alaska returned to the Philadelphia Navy Yard for some minor alterations, including the installation of four Mk 57 fire control directors for her 5-inch guns. On 12 November, she left Philadelphia in the company of the destroyer-minelayer Thomas E. Fraser, bound for two weeks of sea trials off Guantánamo Bay, Cuba. On 2 December, she left Cuba for the Pacific, transiting the Panama Canal two days later, and reaching San Diego on 12 December. There her gun crews trained for shore bombardment and anti-aircraft fire.

On 8 January 1945, Alaska left California for Hawaii, arriving in Pearl Harbor on 13 January. There she participated in further training and was assigned to Task Group 12.2, which departed for Ulithi on 29 January. The Task Group reached Ulithi on 6 February and was merged into Task Group 58.5, part of Task Force 58, the Fast Carrier Task Force. Task Group 58.5 was assigned to provide anti-aircraft defense for the aircraft carriers; Alaska was assigned to the carriers Enterprise and Saratoga. The fleet sailed for Japan on 10 February to conduct air strikes against Tokyo and the surrounding airfields. The Japanese did not attack the fleet during the operation. Alaska was then transferred to Task Group 58.4 and assigned to support the assault on Iwo Jima. She served in the screen for the carriers off Iwo Jima for nineteen days, after which time she had to return to Ulithi to replenish fuel and supplies.

Alaska remained with TG 58.4 for the Battle of Okinawa. She was assigned to screen the carriers Yorktown and Intrepid; the fleet left Ulithi on 14 March and reached its operational area southeast of Kyushu four days later. The first air strikes on Okinawa began that day, and claimed 17 Japanese aircraft destroyed on the ground. Here, Alaska finally saw combat, as the Japanese launched a major air strike on the American fleet. Her anti-aircraft gunners destroyed a Yokosuka P1Y bomber attempting to crash into Intrepid. Shortly thereafter, Alaska was warned that American aircraft were in the vicinity. About ten minutes later, her gunners spotted an unidentified aircraft, approaching in what they thought was a threatening manner; they shot down what turned out to be a Grumman F6F Hellcat fighter, though the pilot was uninjured. Later that afternoon, Alaska shot down a second Japanese bomber, a Yokosuka D4Y.

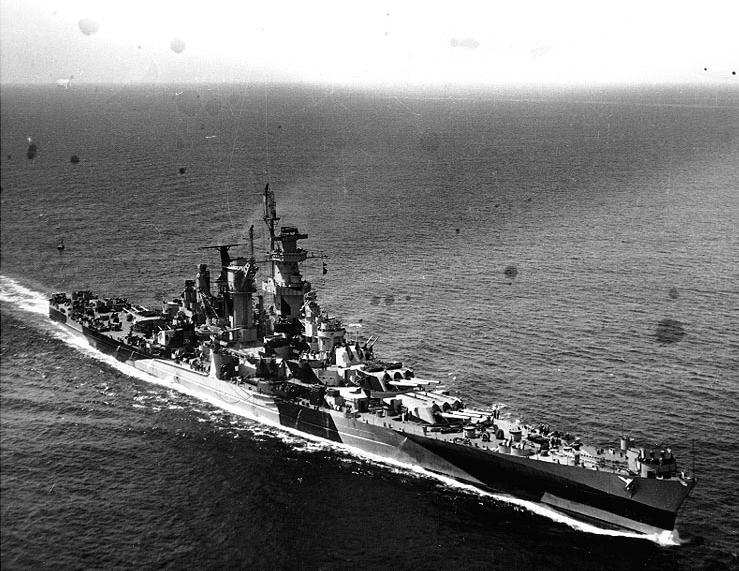
Alaska underway

The following day, the carrier Franklin was badly damaged by several bomb hits and a kamikaze. Alaska and her sister Guam, two other cruisers, and several destroyers were detached to create Task Group 58.2.9 to escort the crippled Franklin back to Ulithi. On the voyage back to port, another D4Y bomber attacked Franklin, though the ships were unable to shoot it down. Gunfire from one of the 5-inch guns accidentally caused flash burns on several men standing nearby; these were the only casualties suffered by her crew during the war. Alaska then took on the role of fighter director; using her air search radar, she vectored fighters to intercept and destroy a Kawasaki Ki-45 heavy fighter. On 22 March, the ships reached Ulithi and Alaska was detached to rejoin TG 58.4.

After returning to her unit, Alaska continued to screen for the aircraft carriers off Okinawa. On 27 March, she was detached to conduct a bombardment of Minamidaitō. She was joined by Guam, two light cruisers, and Destroyer Squadron 47. On the night of 27–28 March, she fired forty-five 12-inch shells and three hundred and fifty-two 5-inch rounds at the island. The ships rejoined TG 58.4 at a refueling point, after which they returned to Okinawa to support the landings when they began on 1 April. On the evening of 11 April, Alaska shot down one Japanese plane, assisted in the destruction of another, and claimed what might have been an Ohka piloted rocket-bomb. On 16 April, the ship shot down another three aircraft and assisted with three others. Throughout the rest of the month, her heavy anti-aircraft fire succeeded in driving off Japanese bombers.

Alaska then returned to Ulithi to resupply, arriving on 14 May. She was then assigned to TG 38.4, the reorganized carrier task force. The fleet then returned to Okinawa, where Alaska continued in her anti-aircraft defense role. On 9 June, she and Guam bombarded Oki Daitō. TG 38.4 then steamed to San Pedro Bay in Leyte Gulf for rest and maintenance; the ship remained there from 13 June until 13 July, when she was assigned to Cruiser Task Force 95 along with her sister Guam, under the command of Rear Admiral Francis S. Low. On 16 July, Alaska and Guam conducted a sweep into the East China and Yellow Seas to sink Japanese shipping vessels. They had only limited success, however, and returned to the fleet on 23 July. They then joined a major raid, which included three battleships and three escort carriers, into the estuary of the Yangtze River off Shanghai. Again, the operation met with limited success. In the course of her service during World War II, Alaska was awarded three battle stars.

=== Post-war ===
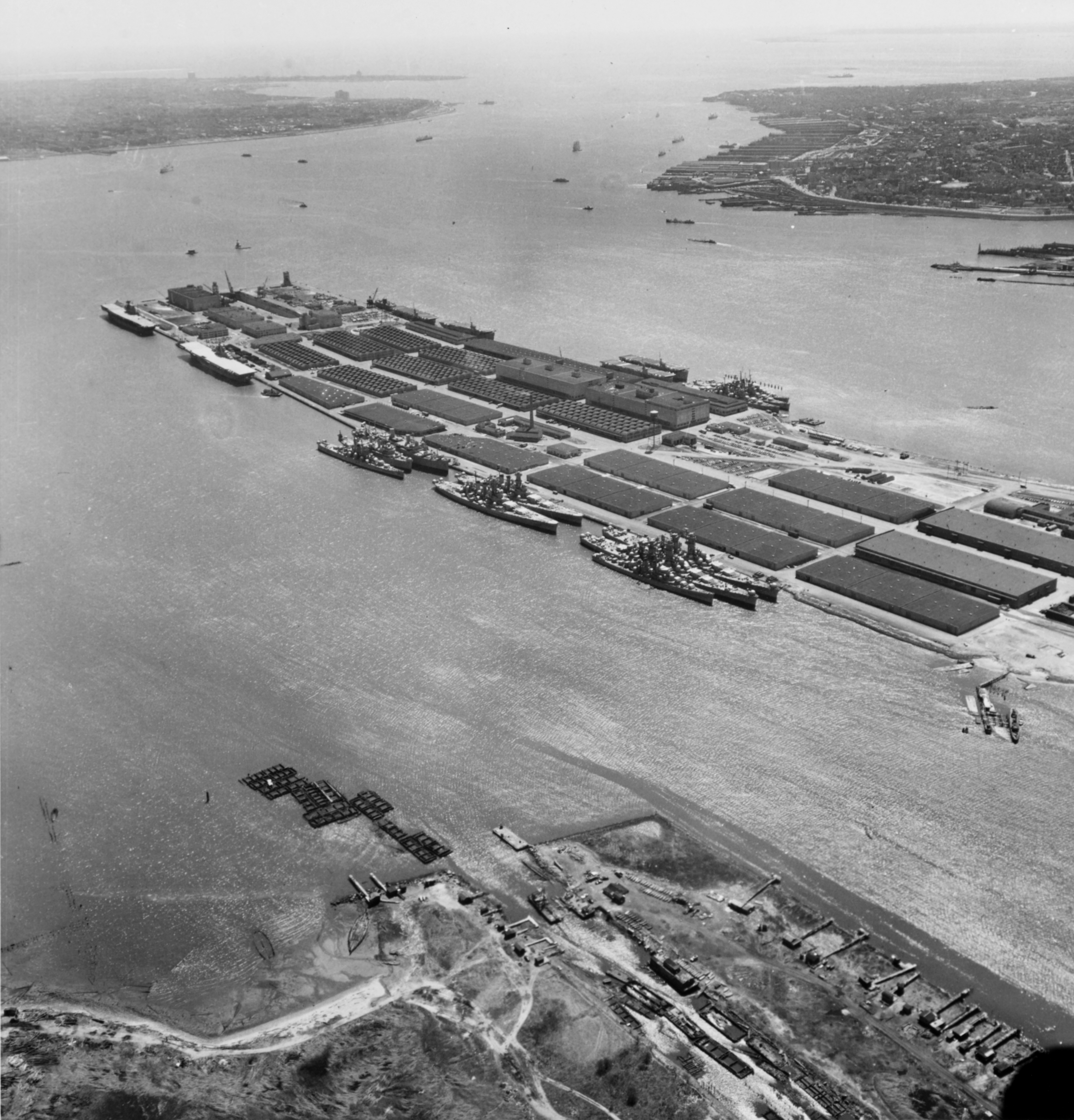
Reserve fleet in Bayonne, New Jersey, 1953; the two large ships at right are Alaska and Guam

On 30 August, Alaska left Okinawa for Japan to participate in the 7th Fleet occupation force. She arrived in Incheon, Korea, on 8 September and supported Army operations there until 26 September, when she left for Qingdao, China, arriving the following day. There, she supported the 6th Marine Division until 13 November, when she returned to Incheon to take on Army soldiers as part of Operation Magic Carpet, the mass repatriation of millions of American servicemen from Asia and Europe. Alaska left Incheon with a contingent of soldiers bound for San Francisco. After reaching San Francisco, she left for the Atlantic, via the Panama Canal, which she transited on 13 December. The ship arrived in the Boston Navy Yard on 18 December, where preparations were made to place the ship in reserve. She left Boston on 1 February 1946 for Bayonne, New Jersey, where she would be berthed in reserve. She arrived there the following day, and on 13 August, she was removed from active service, though she would not be decommissioned until 17 February 1947.

In 1958, the Bureau of Ships prepared two feasibility studies to see if Alaska and Guam were suitable to be converted to guided missile cruisers. The first study involved removing all of the guns in favor of four different missile systems. At $160 million this was seen as too costly, so a second study was conducted. This study left the forward batteries—the two 12-inch triple turrets and three of the 5-inch dual turrets—in place and added a reduced version of the first plan for the aft. This would have cost $82 million, and was still seen as too costly. As a result, the conversion proposal was abandoned and the ship was instead stricken from the Naval Vessel Register on 1 June 1960. On 30 June, she was sold to the Lipsett Division of Luria Brothers to be broken up for scrap.
