= USS S-13 =

S-class submarine of the United States

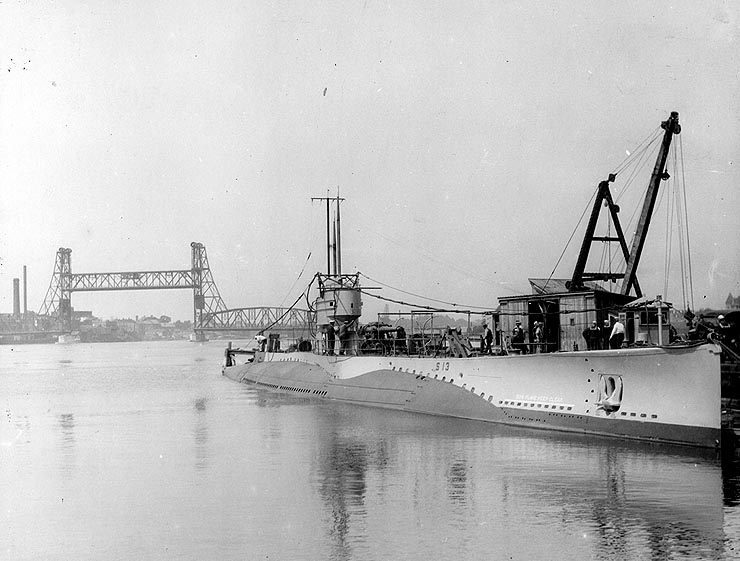
- USS S-13 (SS-118), Portsmouth Navy Yard, c. the 1920s

History

United States
- Name: S-13
- Builder: Portsmouth Navy Yard, on Seavey Island, Kittery, Maine
- Cost: $304,793.43 (hull and machinery)
- Laid down: 14 February 1920
- Launched: 20 October 1921
- Sponsored by: Miss Mary Howe
- Commissioned: 14 July 1923
- Decommissioned: 30 September 1936
- Recommissioned: 28 October 1940
- Decommissioned: 10 April 1945
- Stricken: 19 May 1945
- Identification: Hull symbol: SS-118; Call sign: NIMX
- Fate: Sold for scrapping, 28 October 1945

General characteristics
- Class & type: S-3-class submarine
- Displacement: 930 long tons (945 t) surfaced; 1,138 long tons (1,156 t) submerged
- Length: 231 feet (70 m)
- Beam: 21 ft 10 in (6.65 m)
- Draft: 13 ft 7 in (4.14 m)
- Installed power: 2,000 brake horsepower (1,491 kW) diesel; 1,200 hp (895 kW) electric
- Propulsion: 2 × MAN– New York Navy Yard, S6V45/42 diesel engines; 2 × Westinghouse Electric Corporation electric motors; 2 × 60-cell batteries; 2 × Propellers
- Speed: 14 knots (26 km/h; 16 mph) surfaced; 11 kn (20 km/h; 13 mph) submerged
- Range: 5,500 nautical miles (10,200 km; 6,300 mi) at 11 kn (20 km/h; 13 mph), 7,121 nmi (13,188 km; 8,195 mi) at 9.6 kn (17.8 km/h; 11.0 mph) if fuel loaded into the main ballast tanks
- Test depth: 200 ft (61 m)
- Capacity: 36,950 US gallons (139,900 L; 30,770 imp gal) fuel
- Complement: 4 officers; 34 enlisted
- Armament: 4 × Bow 21-inch (533 mm) torpedo tubes (12 torpedoes); 1 × Stern 21-in torpedo tube (2 torpedoes); 1 × 4-inch (102 mm)/50-caliber

USS S-13 (SS-118) was a part of the second-group of S-3-class, also referred to as a "Modified Government"-type, submarine of the United States Navy.

== Design ==
With lessons learned with the earlier boats, and studies on German U-boats, changes were incorporated into the remaining "Government"-type boats that had not been laid down yet. A stern mounted torpedo tube was added in the aft of the boat, along with the modified bow planes first tested on S-8 and S-9.

The "Modified Government"-type had a length of 231 feet (70.4 m) overall, a beam of 21 ft 10 in (6.7 m), and a mean draft of 13 ft 7 in (4.1 m). They displaced 930 long tons (940 t) on the surface and 1,138 long tons (1,156 t) submerged. All S-class submarines had a crew of 4 officers and 34 enlisted men, when first commissioned. They had a diving depth of 200 ft (61.0 m).

For surface running, the "Modified Government"-type were powered by two 1,000-brake-horsepower (746 kW) MAN S6V45/42 diesel engines built by the New York Navy Yard, each driving one propeller shaft. When submerged each propeller was driven by a 600-horsepower (447 kW) Westinghouse Electric Corporation electric motor. They could reach 14 knots (26 km/h; 16 mph) on the surface and 11 kn (20 km/h; 13 mph) underwater. On the surface, the modified S-3-class had a range of 5,500 nautical miles (10,200 km; 6,300 mi) at 11 kn (20 km/h; 13 mph), or 7,121 nmi (13,188 km; 8,195 mi) at 9.6 kn (17.8 km/h; 11.0 mph), if fuel was loaded into their main ballast tanks.

The boats were armed with four 21-inch (533 mm) torpedo tubes in the bow and one the stern. They carried 9 reloads, for a total of fourteen torpedoes. The "Modified Government"-type submarines were also armed with a single 4 in (100 mm)/50 caliber deck gun.

The Bureau of Construction & Repair (BuC&R) was given the job of correcting the "Government"-type's slow diving times. To accomplish this, starting with S-8 and S-9, they moved the bow planes below the water line and rigged them to be permanently in the out position. Due to the success of these modification, S-10 to S-13 and S-48 to S-51, would also be outfitted with the new planes.

== Construction ==
S-13's keel was laid down on 14 February 1920, by the Portsmouth Navy Yard, in Kittery, Maine. She was launched on 20 October 1921, sponsored by Miss Mary Howe, and commissioned on 14 July 1923 with future Vice Admiral, Lieutenant Wilder D. Baker in command.

== Service history ==
=== 1923–1936 ===
Following duty along the coast of the Northeastern United States in 1923, S-13 visited the Panama Canal Zone, Saint Thomas in the United States Virgin Islands, and Trinidad, from January to April 1924.

Departing New London, Connecticut, on 24 November 1924, she proceeded, via the Panama Canal and California, to Hawaii, which she visited from 27 April to 25 May 1925. She returned to New London on 12 July 1925.

In addition to service in the northeast, from July 1925 through 1928, S-13 operated in the Panama Canal area, from February through April 1926; visited Kingston, Jamaica, from 20–28 March 1927, and served again in the Panama Canal area, from February to April 1928. From 1929 to 1936, she operated almost exclusively in the Panama Canal area, although she visited Baltimore, Maryland, from 15 May to 5 June 1933, and New London, from 15 May to 1 June 1935.

Departing Coco Solo, in the Panama Canal Zone, on 13 June 1936, she was decommissioned on 30 September 1936, at the Philadelphia Navy Yard.

=== 1940–1945 ===
S-13 was recommissioned on 28 October 1940. Following voyages to Bermuda, S-13 operated in the Panama Canal area, from December 1941, during which the United States entered World War II with the Japanese attack on Pearl Harbor on 7 December, to June 1942; off Guantanamo Bay, Cuba, from June to August 1942; and in the Panama Canal area, beginning in August 1942.

She was patrolling on the surface in the Gulf of Panama, off Balboa, Panama, at the Pacific entrance to the Panama Canal, at 07°32′N 090°50′W, on 3 August 1942, when a four-engine United States Army Air Forces bomber approached her and mistakenly attacked her, dropping a number of bombs into the water near her, one of which exploded. She then exchanged recognition signals with the bomber, which departed without further incident. She suffered no casualties or damage.

S-13 operated in the Panama Canal area, until January 1944; then at Trinidad, from February 1944 to May 1944; at Guantanamo Bay, from May through July 1944; and in the Panama Canal area, through the remainder of 1944.

== Fate ==
Departing Coco Solo, on 3 January 1945, S-13 proceeded to Philadelphia, for inactivation. S-13 was decommissioned on 10 April 1945, struck from the Naval Vessel Register on 19 May 1945, and sold on 28 October 1945, to Rosoff Brothers, of New York City, for scrap. She was resold to Northern Metals Company of Philadelphia, and subsequently scrapped.

== In media ==
The 1930 John Ford film, Men Without Women, is set aboard a fictional US Navy submarine named USS S-13.

== Awards ==
- American Defense Service Medal
- American Campaign Medal
- World War II Victory Medal

== Bibliography ==
- "Table 21 - Ships on Navy List June 30, 1919". Congressional Serial Set. U.S. Government Printing Office: 770. 1921.
- Friedman, Norman (1995). U.S. Submarines Through 1945: An Illustrated Design History. Annapolis, Maryland: Naval Institute Press. ISBN 1-55750-263-3.
- Mohl, Michael. "S-13 (SS-118)". Navsource.net.
- Hall, Anne Martin (1925). Ships of the United States navy and their sponsors, 1913-1923.
- "S-13". Dictionary of American Naval Fighting Ships. Navy Department, Naval History and Heritage Command. 1 September 2015. This article incorporates text from this source, which is in the public domain.
- Hedman, Ric; Johnston, David (21 October 2025). "S-10 through S-13". PigBoats.com.
- Hedman, Ric; Johnston, David (21 October 2025a). "S-3 through S-9". PigBoats.com.
- Hinman, Charles R.; Campbell, Douglas E. (2019). The Submarine Has No Friends: Friendly Fire Incidents Involving U.S. Submarines During World War II. Syneca Research Group, Inc. ISBN 978-0-359-76906-3.
