= USS S-9 =

S-class submarine of the United States

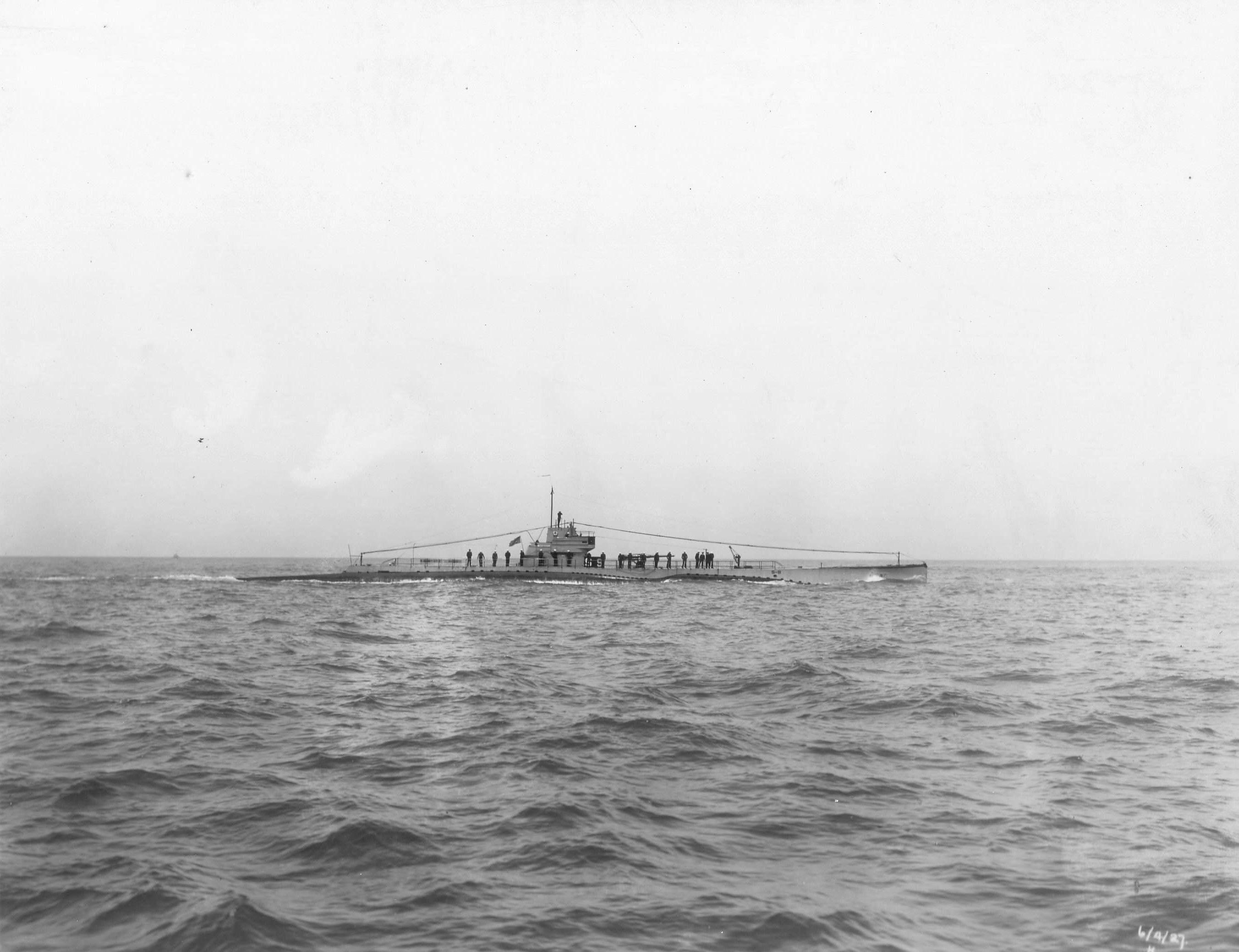
- USS S-9 (SS-114)

History

United States
- Name: S-9
- Builder: Portsmouth Navy Yard, on Seavey Island, Kittery, Maine
- Cost: $305,589.21 (hull and machinery)
- Laid down: 20 January 1919
- Launched: 17 June 1920
- Sponsored by: Mrs. Anna Palmer
- Commissioned: 21 February 1921
- Decommissioned: 15 April 1931
- Stricken: 21 July 1936
- Identification: Hull symbol: SS-114; Call sign: NIMR
- Fate: Sold for scrapping

General characteristics
- Class & type: S-3-class submarine
- Displacement: 875 long tons (889 t) surfaced; 1,088 long tons (1,105 t) submerged
- Length: 231 feet (70 m)
- Beam: 21 ft 10 in (6.65 m)
- Draft: 13 ft 1 in (3.99 m)
- Installed power: 1,400 brake horsepower (1,044 kW) diesel; 1,200 hp (895 kW) electric
- Propulsion: 2 × NELSECO diesel engines; 2 × Westinghouse Electric Corporation electric motors; 1 × 120-cell batteries; 2 × Propellers
- Speed: 15 knots (28 km/h; 17 mph) surfaced; 11 kn (20 km/h; 13 mph) submerged
- Test depth: 200 ft (61 m)
- Capacity: 36,950 US gallons (139,900 L; 30,770 imp gal) fuel
- Complement: 4 officers; 34 enlisted
- Armament: 4 × 21-inch (533 mm) torpedo tubes (12 torpedoes); 1 × 4-inch (102 mm)/50-caliber

USS S-9 (SS-114) was an S-3-class, also referred to as a "Government"-type, submarine of the United States Navy.

== Design ==
The "Government"-type had a length of 231 feet (70.4 m) overall, a beam of 21 ft 10 in (6.7 m), and a mean draft of 13 ft 1 in (4.0 m). They displaced 875 long tons (889 t) on the surface and 1,088 long tons (1,105 t) submerged. All S-class submarines had a crew of 4 officers and 34 enlisted men, when first commissioned. They had a diving depth of 200 ft (61.0 m).

For surface running, the S-3-class were powered by two 700-brake-horsepower (522 kW) NELSECO diesel engines, each driving one propeller shaft. When submerged each propeller was driven by a 600-horsepower (447 kW) Westinghouse Electric Corporation electric motor. They could reach 15 knots (28 km/h; 17 mph) on the surface and 11 kn (20 km/h; 13 mph) underwater.

The boats were armed with four 21-inch (533 mm) torpedo tubes in the bow. They carried eight reloads, for a total of twelve torpedoes. The S-3-class submarines were also armed with a single 4 in (100 mm)/50 caliber deck gun.

The Bureau of Construction & Repair (BuC&R) was given the job of correcting the "Government"-type's slow diving times. To accomplish this, starting with S-8 and S-9, they moved the bow planes below the water line and rigged them to be permanently in the out position. Due to the success of these modification, S-10 to S-13 and S-48 to S-51, would also be outfitted with the new planes.

== Construction ==
S-9's keel was laid down on 20 January 1919, by the Portsmouth Naval Shipyard, in Kittery, Maine. She was launched on 17 June 1920, sponsored by Mrs. Anna Palmer, and commissioned on 21 February 1921.

== Service history ==
Following duty off the northeast coast, S-9 sailed from New London, Connecticut, on 31 May 1921, and proceeded via the Panama Canal, California, and Pearl Harbor, to the Philippines, arriving at Cavite, Luzon, on 6 December 1921. There, she joined Submarine Division 12 (SubDiv 12), whose S-boats, along with those of SubDiv 18, had arrived on 1 December. In 1922, she sailed from Cavite, on 11 October, visited Hong Kong, from 14 to 28 October, and returned to Cavite, on 31 October. On 30 April 1923, she departed from Cavite and visited Shanghai, Yantai, and Qinhuangdao, China, before returning via Wusong and Amoy, to Cavite, on 11 September. On 23 June 1924, she sailed from Manila Bay, and again visited ports in China, before returning to Olongapo, on 23 September.

Departing from Cavite, on 29 October, S-9 arrived at the Mare Island Navy Yard, California, on 30 December. Remaining at Mare Island, in 1925, she operated along the West Coast in 1926, mainly at San Francisco, San Pedro Submarine Base-San Pedro, and San Diego, California. Departing Mare Island, on 11 February 1927, she operated in the Panama Canal area from March into April, arrived at New London, on 3 May, and spent the remainder of 1927 along the northeast coast. S-9 served in the Panama Canal area from February–April 1928, from January–March 1929, and from January–March 1930.

== Fate ==
Departing New London, on 22 October, S-9 was decommissioned on 15 April 1931, at the Philadelphia Navy Yard. She was struck from the Naval Vessel Register on 25 January 1937.

== Bibliography ==
- "Table 21 - Ships on Navy List June 30, 1919". Congressional Serial Set. U.S. Government Printing Office: 770. 1921.
- Friedman, Norman (1995). U.S. Submarines Through 1945: An Illustrated Design History. Annapolis, Maryland: Naval Institute Press. ISBN 1-55750-263-3.
- Priolo, Gary. "S-9 (SS-114)". Navsource.net.
- Hall, Anne Martin (1925). Ships of the United States navy and their sponsors, 1913-1923.
- "S-9". Dictionary of American Naval Fighting Ships. Navy Department, Naval History and Heritage Command. 1 September 2015. This article incorporates text from this source, which is in the public domain.
- Hedman, Ric; Johnston, David (21 October 2025). "S-3 through S-9". PigBoats.com.
