= USS S-8 =

S-class submarine of the United States

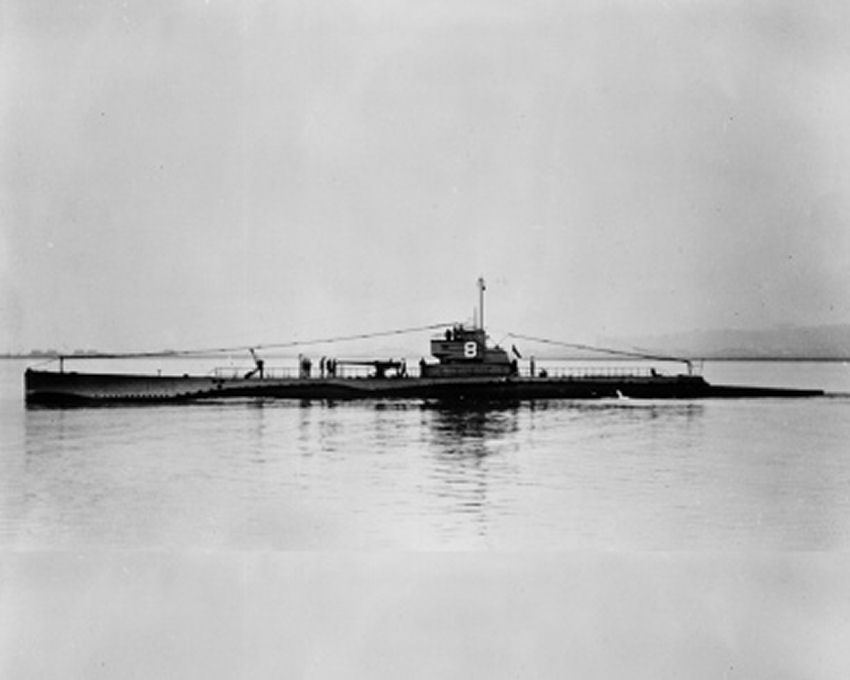
- USS S-8 (SS-113)

History

United States
- Name: S-8
- Builder: Portsmouth Navy Yard, on Seavey Island, Kittery, Maine
- Cost: $306,124.62 (hull and machinery)
- Laid down: 9 November 1918
- Launched: 21 April 1920
- Sponsored by: Mrs. Garnett Ryden
- Commissioned: 1 October 1920
- Decommissioned: 11 April 1931
- Stricken: 25 January 1937
- Identification: Hull symbol: SS-113; Call sign: NIMQ
- Fate: Sold for scrapping, 25 January 1937

General characteristics
- Class & type: S-3-class submarine
- Displacement: 875 long tons (889 t) surfaced; 1,088 long tons (1,105 t) submerged
- Length: 231 feet (70 m)
- Beam: 21 ft 10 in (6.65 m)
- Draft: 13 ft 1 in (3.99 m)
- Installed power: 1,400 brake horsepower (1,044 kW) diesel; 1,200 hp (895 kW) electric
- Propulsion: 2 × NELSECO diesel engines; 2 × Westinghouse Electric Corporation electric motors; 1 × 120-cell batteries; 2 × Propellers
- Speed: 15 knots (28 km/h; 17 mph) surfaced; 11 kn (20 km/h; 13 mph) submerged
- Test depth: 200 ft (61 m)
- Capacity: 36,950 US gallons (139,900 L; 30,770 imp gal) fuel
- Complement: 4 officers; 34 enlisted
- Armament: 4 × 21-inch (533 mm) torpedo tubes (12 torpedoes); 1 × 4-inch (102 mm)/50-caliber

USS S-8 (SS-113) was an S-3-class, also referred to as a "Government"-type, submarine of the United States Navy.

== Design ==
The "Government"-type had a length of 231 feet (70.4 m) overall, a beam of 21 ft 10 in (6.7 m), and a mean draft of 13 ft 1 in (4.0 m). They displaced 875 long tons (889 t) on the surface and 1,088 long tons (1,105 t) submerged. All S-class submarines had a crew of 4 officers and 34 enlisted men, when first commissioned. They had a diving depth of 200 ft (61.0 m).

For surface running, the S-3-class were powered by two 700-brake-horsepower (522 kW) NELSECO diesel engines, each driving one propeller shaft. When submerged each propeller was driven by a 600-horsepower (447 kW) Westinghouse Electric Corporation electric motor. They could reach 15 knots (28 km/h; 17 mph) on the surface and 11 kn (20 km/h; 13 mph) underwater.

The boats were armed with four 21-inch (533 mm) torpedo tubes in the bow. They carried eight reloads, for a total of twelve torpedoes. The S-3-class submarines were also armed with a single 4 in (100 mm)/50 caliber deck gun.

The Bureau of Construction & Repair (BuC&R) was given the job of correcting the "Government"-type's slow diving times. To accomplish this, starting with S-8 and S-9, they moved the bow planes below the water line and rigged them to be permanently in the out position. Due to the success of these modification, S-10 to S-13 and S-48 to S-51, would also be outfitted with the new planes.

== Construction ==
S-8's keel was laid down on 9 November 1918, by the Portsmouth Naval Shipyard, in Kittery, Maine. She was launched on 21 April 1920, sponsored by Mrs. Garnett Ryden, and commissioned on 1 October 1920.

== Service history ==
S-8 sailed from Newport, Rhode Island, on 7 December 1920, and was attached to Submarine Division 12 (SubDiv 12). After her division had rendezvoused with SubDiv 18 off Portsmouth, they proceeded via the Panama Canal and California, to Hawaii, arriving at Pearl Harbor, on 15 April 1921. Departing Pearl Harbor, on 3 November, they arrived at Cavite, Luzon, in the Philippines, on 1 December. This voyage set a record for American submarines, at that time, as the longest cruise ever undertaken. Submarines which had previously served in the Asiatic Fleet, the Plunger-class, had been carried over tied to the decks of colliers.

The two divisions, which comprised Submarine Flotilla 3 (SubFlot 3), operated out of Cavite, for the next three years, with annual visits to ports in China. They finally departed Cavite, on 29 October 1924, and arrived at the Mare Island Navy Yard, California, on 30 December.

S-8 remained at Mare Island, through 1925, operated along the West Coast during 1926, and sailed on 10 February 1927, for the Panama Canal Zone. She operated at Coco Solo, from March into April, and then sailed for New London, Connecticut, arriving on 3 May.

S-8 spent the next three years operating along the New England coast, out of New London, with the exception of training cruises to the Panama Canal area from February–April 1928, January–April 1929, and January–March 1930.

== Fate ==
Departing New London, on 22 October, S-8 sailed to the Philadelphia Navy Yard, where she was decommissioned on 11 April 1931. She was struck from the Naval Vessel Register on 25 January 1937.

== Bibliography ==
- "Table 21 - Ships on Navy List June 30, 1919". Congressional Serial Set. U.S. Government Printing Office: 770. 1921.
- Friedman, Norman (1995). U.S. Submarines Through 1945: An Illustrated Design History. Annapolis, Maryland: Naval Institute Press. ISBN 1-55750-263-3.
- Priolo, Gary. "S-8 (SS-113)". Navsource.net.
- Hall, Anne Martin (1925). Ships of the United States navy and their sponsors, 1913-1923.
- "S-8". Dictionary of American Naval Fighting Ships. Navy Department, Naval History and Heritage Command. 1 September 2015. This article incorporates text from this source, which is in the public domain.
- Hedman, Ric; Johnston, David (21 October 2025). "S-3 through S-9". PigBoats.com.
