= USS S-10 =

S-class submarine of the United States

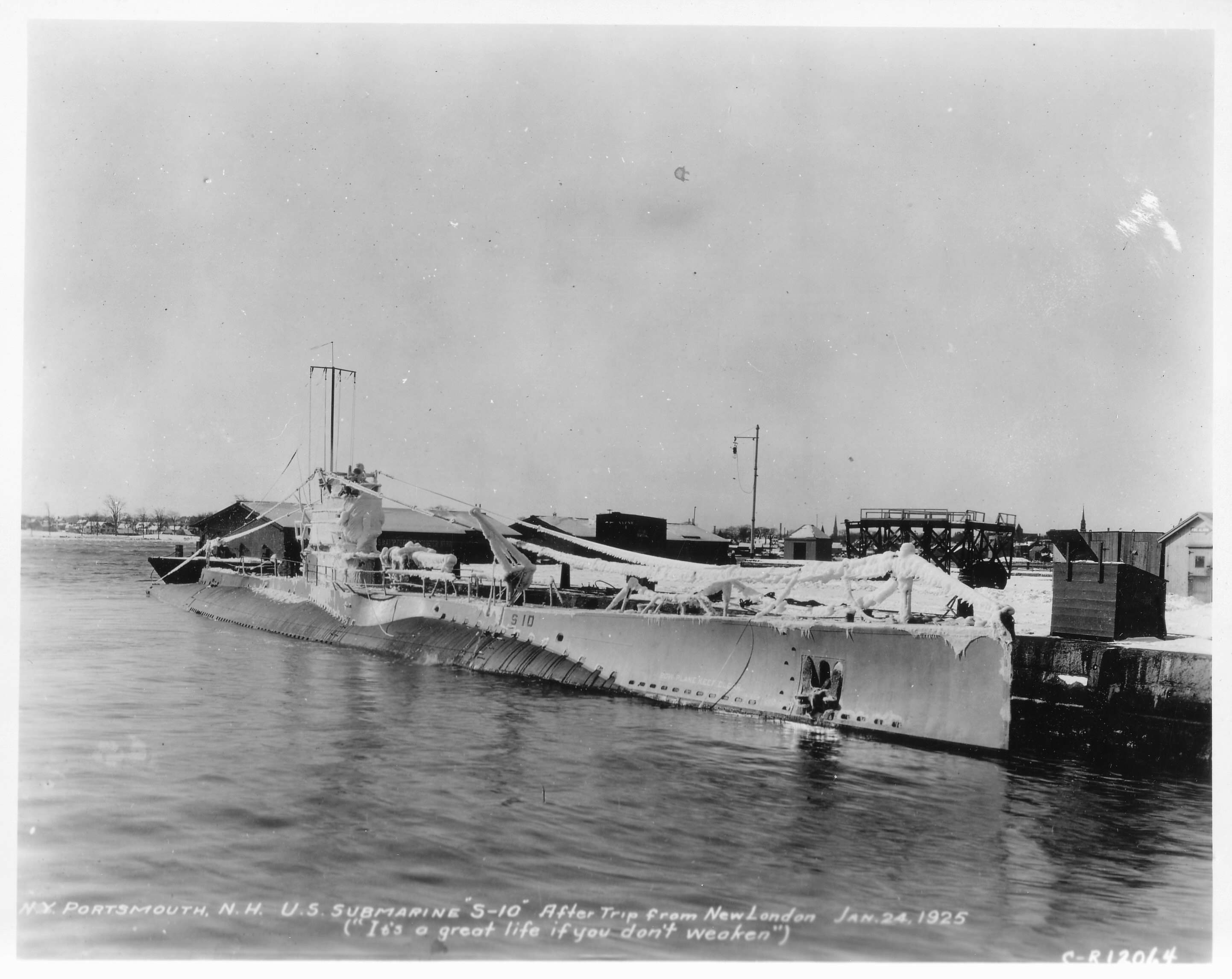
- USS S-10 (SS-115) after a trip from New London, at the Portsmouth Navy Yard, in Kittery, Maine, 24 January 1925

History

United States
- Name: S-10
- Builder: Portsmouth Navy Yard, on Seavey Island, Kittery, Maine
- Cost: $305,589.23 (hull and machinery)
- Laid down: 11 September 1919
- Launched: 9 December 1920
- Sponsored by: Miss Marian Kingsbury Payne
- Commissioned: 21 September 1922
- Decommissioned: 17 July 1936
- Stricken: 17 July 1936
- Identification: Hull symbol: SS-115; Call sign: NIMS
- Fate: Sold for scrapping, 13 November 1936

General characteristics
- Class & type: S-3-class submarine
- Displacement: 930 long tons (945 t) surfaced; 1,138 long tons (1,156 t) submerged
- Length: 231 feet (70 m)
- Beam: 21 ft 10 in (6.65 m)
- Draft: 13 ft 7 in (4.14 m)
- Installed power: 2,000 brake horsepower (1,491 kW) diesel; 1,200 hp (895 kW) electric
- Propulsion: 2 × MAN–New York Navy Yard, S6V45/42 diesel engines; 2 × Westinghouse Electric Corporation electric motors; 2 × 60-cell batteries; 2 × Propellers
- Speed: 14 knots (26 km/h; 16 mph) surfaced; 11 kn (20 km/h; 13 mph) submerged
- Range: 5,500 nautical miles (10,200 km; 6,300 mi) at 11 kn (20 km/h; 13 mph), 7,121 nmi (13,188 km; 8,195 mi) at 9.6 kn (17.8 km/h; 11.0 mph) if fuel loaded into the main ballast tanks
- Test depth: 200 ft (61 m)
- Capacity: 36,950 US gallons (139,900 L; 30,770 imp gal) fuel
- Complement: 4 officers; 34 enlisted
- Armament: 4 × Bow 21-inch (533 mm) torpedo tubes (12 torpedoes); 1 × Stern 21-in torpedo tube (2 torpedoes); 1 × 4-inch (102 mm)/50-caliber

USS S-10 (SS-115) was a part of the second-group of S-3-class, also referred to as a "Modified Government"-type, submarine of the United States Navy.

== Design ==
With lessons learned with the earlier boats, and studies on German U-boats, changes were incorporated into the remaining "Government"-type boats that had not been laid down yet. A stern mounted torpedo tube was added in the aft of the boat, along with the modified bow planes first tested on S-8 and S-9.

The "Modified Government"-type had a length of 231 feet (70.4 m) overall, a beam of 21 ft 10 in (6.7 m), and a mean draft of 13 ft 7 in (4.1 m). They displaced 930 long tons (940 t) on the surface and 1,138 long tons (1,156 t) submerged. All S-class submarines had a crew of 4 officers and 34 enlisted men, when first commissioned. They had a diving depth of 200 ft (61.0 m).

For surface running, the "Modified Government"-type were powered by two 1,000-brake-horsepower (746 kW) MAN S6V45/42 diesel engines built by the New York Navy Yard, each driving one propeller shaft. When submerged each propeller was driven by a 600-horsepower (447 kW) Westinghouse Electric Corporation electric motor. They could reach 14 knots (26 km/h; 16 mph) on the surface and 11 kn (20 km/h; 13 mph) underwater. On the surface, the modified S-3-class had a range of 5,500 nautical miles (10,200 km; 6,300 mi) at 11 kn (20 km/h; 13 mph), or 7,121 nmi (13,188 km; 8,195 mi) at 9.6 kn (17.8 km/h; 11.0 mph), if fuel was loaded into their main ballast tanks.

The boats were armed with four 21-inch (533 mm) torpedo tubes in the bow and one the stern. They carried 9 reloads, for a total of fourteen torpedoes. The "Modified Government"-type submarines were also armed with a single 4 in (100 mm)/50 caliber deck gun.

The Bureau of Construction & Repair (BuC&R) was given the job of correcting the "Government"-type's slow diving times. To accomplish this, starting with S-8 and S-9, they moved the bow planes below the water line and rigged them to be permanently in the out position. Due to the success of these modification, S-10 to S-13 and S-48 to S-51, would also be outfitted with the new planes.

== Construction ==
S-10's keel was laid down on 11 September 1919, by the Portsmouth Navy Yard, in Kittery, Maine. She was launched on 9 December 1920, sponsored by Miss Marian Kingsbury Payne, and commissioned on 21 September 1922.

== Service history ==
Following duty off the northeast coast, S-10 visited the Panama Canal area, St. Thomas, Virgin Islands, and Trinidad and Tobago, in early 1924, and completed that year along the northeast coast.

Sailing from Boston, Massachusetts, on 19 February 1925, S-10 voyaged via the Panama Canal and California, to the Territory of Hawaii, arriving on 27 April. She returned to New London, Connecticut, on 12 July, and completed that year in New England waters.

In addition to duty out of New London, from 1926 to 1928, S-10 operated in the Panama Canal area, from February–April 1926, visited Guantanamo Bay and Kingston, Jamaica, in March 1927, and served again at the Panama Canal, from February–March 1928. From 1929 to 1936, S-10 served almost exclusively in the Panama Canal area, although she visited Memphis, Tennessee, from 11 to 15 May 1933, and was in reserve, with a partial crew, at Coco Solo, from 1 July-27 November that year.

== Fate ==
Departing Coco Solo, on 30 March 1936, S-10 was decommissioned at the Philadelphia Navy Yard, and struck from the Naval Vessel Register, on 17 July 1936. She was sold for scrapping, 13 November 1936.

== Bibliography ==
- "Table 21 - Ships on Navy List June 30, 1919". Congressional Serial Set. U.S. Government Printing Office: 770. 1921.
- Friedman, Norman (1995). U.S. Submarines Through 1945: An Illustrated Design History. Annapolis, Maryland: Naval Institute Press. ISBN 1-55750-263-3.
- Priolo, Gary. "S-10 (SS-115)". Navsource.net.
- Hall, Anne Martin (1925). Ships of the United States navy and their sponsors, 1913-1923.
- "S-10". Dictionary of American Naval Fighting Ships. Navy Department, Naval History and Heritage Command. 1 September 2015. This article incorporates text from this source, which is in the public domain.
- Hedman, Ric; Johnston, David (21 October 2025). "S-10 through S-13". PigBoats.com.
- Hedman, Ric; Johnston, David (21 October 2025a). "S-3 through S-9". PigBoats.com.
