= Francis S. Low =

United States Navy admiral

Francis Stuart Low
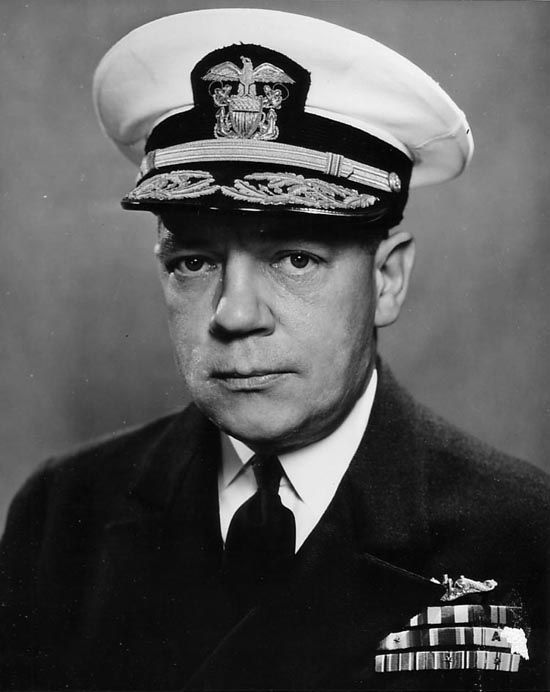
- Adm. Francis S. Low, USN
- Born: August 15, 1894; Albany, New York, U.S.
- Died: January 22, 1964 (aged 69); Oakland, California, U.S.
- Military career
- Allegiance: United States
- Branch: United States Navy
- Service years: 1915–1956
- Rank: Admiral
- Nickname: "Frog"
- Service number: 0-9018
- Commands: Western Sea Frontier; Cruiser Division 16; USS Wichita (CA-45); USS Paul Jones (DD-230); USS S-12 (SS-117)
- Conflicts: Veracruz Expedition; Haitian Campaign; World War I Yangtze Patrol; World War II: Operation Torch; Battle of Rennell Island; Battle of Iwo Jima; Battle of Okinawa
- Awards: Distinguished Service Medal; Legion of Merit; Bronze Star Medal; Navy Commendation Medal

Francis Stuart Low CBE (August 15, 1894 – January 22, 1964) was a decorated officer of the United States Navy with the rank of four-star admiral. An expert in submarine warfare, Low is credited with the idea that twin-engined Army bombers could be launched from an aircraft carrier. This idea was later adopted for the planning of the Doolittle Raid.

Low distinguished himself as Chief of Staff, U.S. Tenth Fleet, during the anti-U-boat campaign in the Atlantic Ocean and completed his career in 1956 as Commander, Western Sea Frontier, and Commander Pacific Reserve Fleet.

== Early career ==
Francis S. Low was born on August 15, 1894, in Albany, New York, the son of late Commander William Franklin Low, USN, and Mrs. Anna (Stuart) Low. His family later moved to Newton, Massachusetts, and young Francis attended high school there.

He subsequently received an appointment to the United States Naval Academy at Annapolis, Maryland, in summer of 1911. While at the Academy, Low was active in the swimming team and held record in 220-yard swimming. He was nicknamed "Frog" by his classmates and graduated with a bachelor's degree in June 1915.

Low was commissioned ensign at the time of his graduation and attached to the battleship USS Connecticut. He was later transferred to the heavy cruiser USS Montana. While aboard that ship, he participated in the Veracruz Expedition and Haitian Campaign.

Following his first sea duties, he was then attached to the submarine USS D-3 and began training at Naval Submarine Base New London, Connecticut. After six months of training, Low was attached to the USS O-9, under the command of Lieutenant j.g. Robert H. English and served as his deputy in patrols protecting the Atlantic coast from U-boats. She departed Newport November 2, 1918, for European waters, but the termination of hostilities brought the submarine back to the United States.

== Interwar period ==
Following the end of the war, Low was appointed commanding officer of USS L-1 and led her during training cruises off the coast of Hampton Roads, Virginia. He was transferred to the command of USS L-2 at the end of January 1920 and took part in the submarine experiments with torpedo and undersea detection techniques along the Atlantic coast.

Low assumed command of the newly commissioned USS S-12 at the end of April 1923 and sailed to Guantanamo, Cuba, and then via the Panama Canal to Hawaii. He left in summer of 1925 to attend the junior course at the Naval War College at Newport, Rhode Island. Following his graduation one year later, Low was appointed an instructor in the Department of Seamanship at the Naval Academy at Annapolis, Maryland. He was then attached to the battleship USS New Mexico and participated in training exercises in the Atlantic and the Pacific oceans.

He was appointed officer in charge of the Recruiters' Training School, Naval Station, Hampton Roads, Virginia, in 1929, serving until the summer of 1932. Low was then attached to the Staff, Submarine Squadron 5, for a brief period and subsequently assumed command of destroyer USS Paul Jones in June 1932. He commanded that ship during the Yangtze River Patrol and then took part in patrolling along the China coast, while making occasional voyages to and from Manila.

Low returned to the United States in March 1934 and was assigned to the Bureau of Navigation. He was later transferred to the Office of the Chief of Naval Operations, under Admiral William H. Standley. He returned to sea in summer of 1937, when he was appointed commander of Submarine Squadron 13 and held this command during the Neutrality Patrol in 1939.

== World War II ==
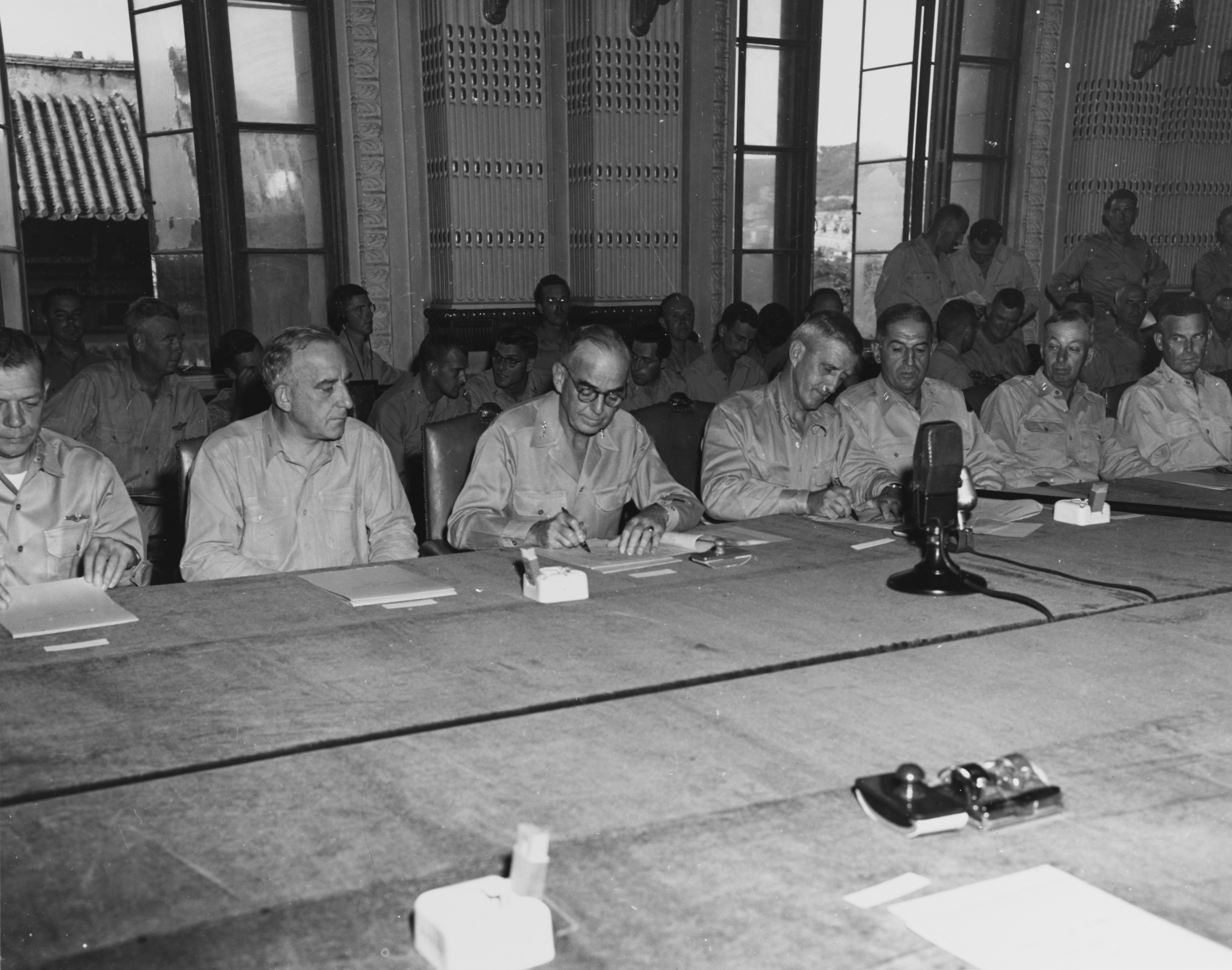
Low (far left) during the surrender of Japanese Forces in Southern Korea: U.S. delegates Admiral Thomas C. Kinkaid and Lieutenant General John R. Hodge sign surrender documents, September 9, 1945.

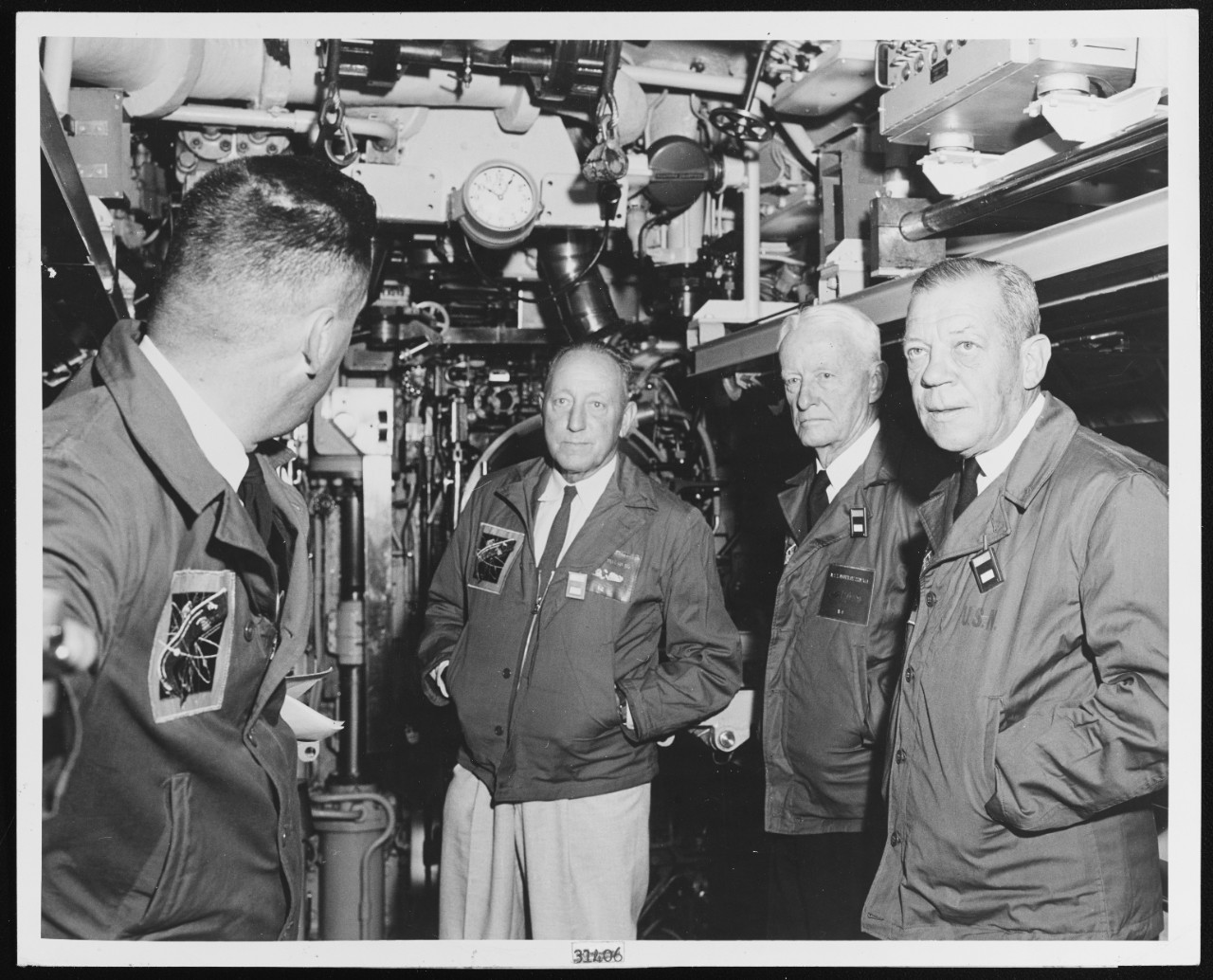
Low (right) with Admirals Nimitz (second from right) and Lockwood during the visit of submarine Nautilus in June 1957.

Low returned to Washington, D.C., in December 1940 and served again in the Office of the Chief of Naval Operations, under Admiral Harold R. Stark. Following the appointment of Admiral Ernest J. King as Chief of Naval Operations in March 1942, Low remained in his office and served as Operations Officer, as well as Assistant Chief of Staff for antisubmarine warfare.

Following the Japanese attack on Pearl Harbor on December 7, 1941, Low came up with the idea that twin-engined Army bombers could be launched from an aircraft carrier, after observing several at a naval airfield in Norfolk, Virginia, where the runway had been painted with the outline of a carrier deck for landing practice. Low sold the idea to Admiral King, who respected Low's opinion and forwarded it to the chief of the Army Air Forces, General Henry H. Arnold, who supported the plan. The operations later became known as the Doolittle Raid, the first air operation to strike the Japanese Home Islands. It demonstrated that the Japanese mainland was vulnerable to American air attack, served as retaliation for Pearl Harbor, and provided an important boost to American morale.

Low remained in this capacity until the beginning of September 1942 and received the Navy Commendation Medal for his service in Washington. He was subsequently ordered to New York Navy Yard and assumed command of the heavy cruiser USS Wichita, which was there for repairs. Low led his vessel during training off the Virginia Capes for the rest of the month, after which she steamed to Casco Bay in Maine for further maneuvers.

Wichita participated in the Naval Battle of Casablanca, part of Operation Torch, the Anglo–American invasion of French North Africa, during November 1942 and helped neutralize the primary French defenses, which included coastal guns on El Hank, several submarines, and the incomplete battleship Jean Bart, which lay at anchor in the harbor. Wichita was damaged, and after series of patrols between Casablanca and Fedhala, she departed for New York for repairs on November 16. Low received the Bronze Star Medal with Combat "V" for his service in North African waters.

Low subsequently commanded his vessel to the Pacific theater and participated in the Battle of Rennell Island in January 1943, before he was recalled to Washington, D.C., on March 10, 1943. After brief stint there, he was promoted to the rank of rear admiral on April 6, 1943, and appointed Chief of Staff of newly established United States Tenth Fleet under his old superior, Admiral Ernest J. King, who delegated command of the Tenth Fleet to Low. The Tenth Fleet was established as the result of negotiations between Britain, Canada and the United States to intercept U-boat operations against the merchant convoys and other allied vessels. It had no battleships, carriers, cruisers or destroyers, only desks, plotting boards and laboratories. Its personnel numbered less than 500, all landlubbers and half of them scientists. The radio operators and radio direction finders drew attention of German submarines, and although the Tenth Fleet did not sink any enemy submarines, it forwarded the reports of enemy activity to the United States Atlantic Fleet, the Royal Navy and the Royal Canadian Navy.

Admiral Low was responsible for the day-to-day operations of the Tenth Fleet and also maintained the liaison with the General Staff of the United States Army, the British Admiralty and the Canadian Naval Headquarters to insure maximum efficiency in combined operations. He coordinated and directed the activities of Allied anti-submarine forces as they systematically tracked down and destroyed German undersea marauders ranging the Atlantic. Low was also responsible for the protection of Allied shipping in the Eastern, Gulf and Caribbean Sea Frontiers and exercised close control over all convoys under United States cognizance.

He remained in this capacity until January 1945, when he was replaced by Rear Admiral Allan R. McCann and ordered to the Pacific theater. For his service with the Tenth Fleet, Low was decorated with the Navy Distinguished Service Medal. He was also appointed a commander of the Order of the British Empire.

Upon his arrival in the Pacific, Low assumed command of Cruiser Division 16, consisting of the battlecruisers Alaska and Guam, and directed his force in strikes in support of the landings on Iwo Jima and Okinawa, and in strikes on other islands of the Nansei Shoto and the Japanese home islands of Kyushu and southern Honshu. He was later decorated with the Legion of Merit with Combat "V" for his service during that campaigns. He then led his command during combat operations off the coast of the Philippines and was made a commander of the Philippine Legion of Honor.

== Later career ==
Following the end of War, Low was in charge of the surrender and neutralization of all Japanese naval installations in Korea until November 1945, when he was appointed Commander, Destroyers Pacific Fleet. Low remained in this capacity until March 1947, when he assumed command of Service Forces, Pacific. He was also promoted to the rank of vice admiral at that date.

Low was ordered to the Navy Department in November 1949 to conduct a special survey of the Navy's anti-submarine program, and in February 1950 was designated Deputy Chief of Naval Operations for Logistics. He was responsible for the planning of budget for logistics for all marine forces and advocating before the congressional committee on appropriations until May 1953, when he became Commander, Western Sea Frontier, and Commander Pacific Reserve Fleet.

Upon being relieved by Rear Admiral John R. Redman, he retired after 41 years of active service on July 1, 1956, and was advanced to the rank of four-star admiral on the retired list for having been specially commended in combat. Low was decorated with the Legion of Honour by France and the Order of Merit of the Italian Republic.

== Retirement ==
Upon his retirement from the Navy, Low settled in Oakland, California, where he died on January 22, 1964, at Naval Hospital Oakland.

== Decorations ==
Here is the ribbon bar of Admiral Francis S. Low:

Submarine Warfare insignia
1st Row	Navy Distinguished Service Medal		Legion of Merit with Combat "V"
2nd Row	Bronze Star Medal with Combat "V"	Navy Commendation Medal	Mexican Service Medal
3rd Row	Haitian Campaign Medal	World War I Victory Medal with Submarine Clasp	Yangtze Service Medal
4th Row	American Defense Service Medal with "A" Device	American Campaign Medal	European–African–Middle Eastern Campaign Medal with one 3/16 inch service star
5th Row	Asiatic-Pacific Campaign Medal with two 3/16 inch service stars	World War II Victory Medal	Navy Occupation Service Medal
6th Row	National Defense Service Medal	Commander of the Order of the British Empire	Legion of Honour, Commander
7th Row	Order of Merit of the Italian Republic, Grand Officer	Commander of the Philippine Legion of Honor	Philippine Liberation Medal with one star

== See also ==
- Western Sea Frontier
- List of United States Navy four-star admirals

Military offices
Preceded by John L. Hall Jr.	Commander, Western Sea Frontier; May 1953 - July 1956	Succeeded by William M. Callaghan
