= USS Kidder =

Clemson-class destroyer

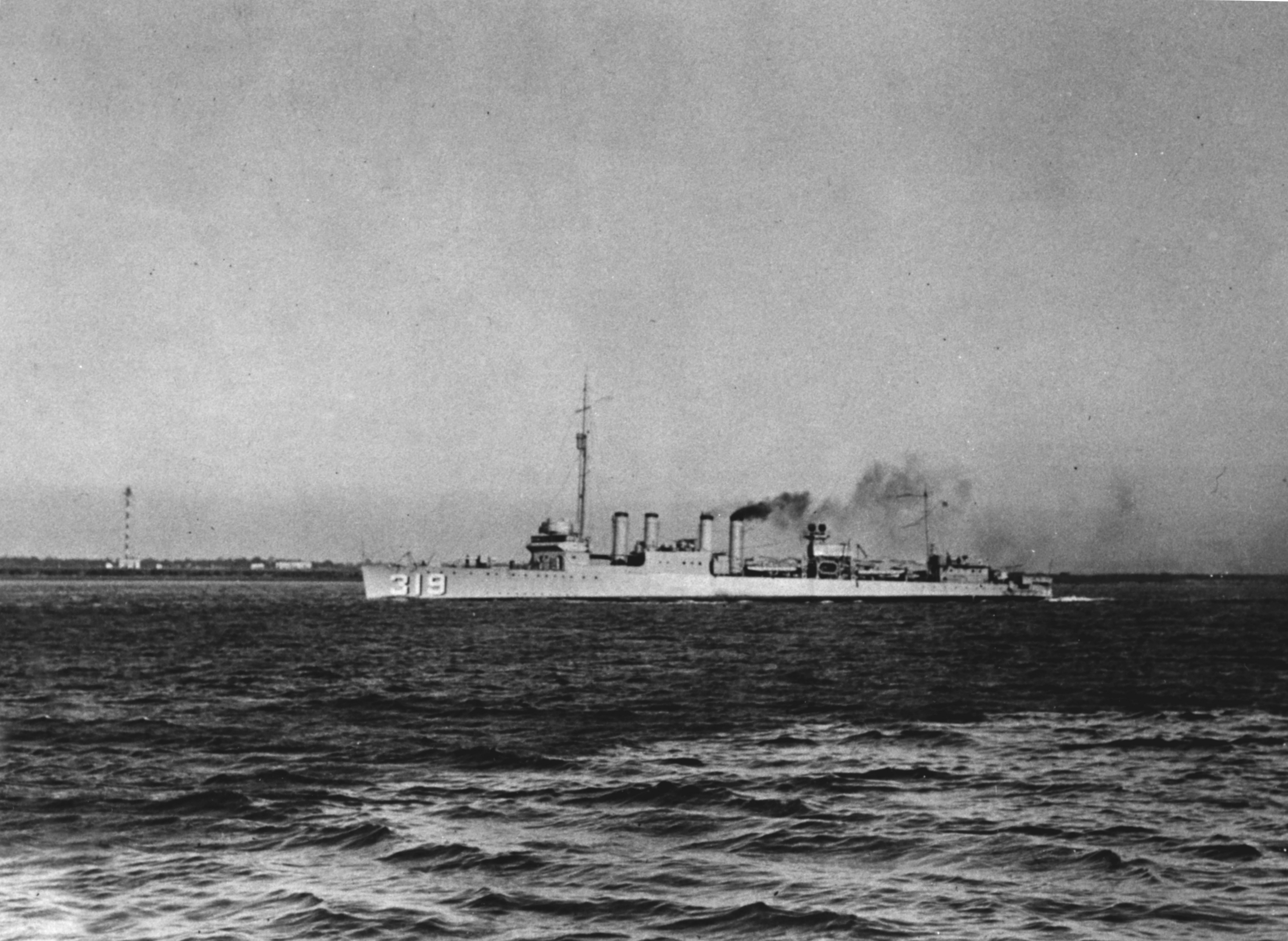

History

United States
- Namesake: Hugh Kidder
- Builder: Bethlehem Shipbuilding Corporation, Union Iron Works, San Francisco
- Laid down: 5 March 1919
- Launched: 10 July 1919
- Commissioned: 7 February 1921
- Decommissioned: 18 March 1930
- Stricken: 22 July 1930
- Fate: Sold for scrap, 31 October 1930

General characteristics
- Class & type: Clemson-class destroyer
- Displacement: 1,290 long tons (1,311 t) (standard); 1,389 long tons (1,411 t) (deep load)
- Length: 314 ft 4 in (95.8 m)
- Beam: 30 ft 11 in (9.42 m)
- Draught: 10 ft 3 in (3.1 m)
- Installed power: 27,000 shp (20,000 kW); 4 water-tube boilers
- Propulsion: 2 shafts, 2 steam turbines
- Speed: 35 knots (65 km/h; 40 mph) (design)
- Range: 2,500 nautical miles (4,600 km; 2,900 mi) at 20 knots (37 km/h; 23 mph) (design)
- Complement: 6 officers, 108 enlisted men
- Armament: 4 × single 4-inch (102 mm) guns; 2 × single 1-pounder AA guns or; 2 × single 3-inch (76 mm) guns; 4 × triple 21 inch (533 mm) torpedo tubes; 2 × depth charge rails

USS Kidder (DD-319) was a Clemson-class destroyer in service with the United States Navy from 1921 to 1930. She was scrapped in 1931.

== Namesake ==
Hugh P. Kidder was born in 1897 in Waukon, Iowa. He enlisted in the United States Marine Corps and served in France during World War I. He was awarded the Croix de Guerre with palm and star during World War I for courage and endurance while carrying orders to advanced positions under violent machine gun fire during a period of 9 days. He was awarded the Distinguished Service Cross for extraordinary heroism near Blanch Mont on 2 October 1918 when he led a small patrol into enemy trenches and captured two strong machine gun positions. First Lieutenant Kidder was killed in action on 3 October attempting to better his position in the face of heavy machine gun and artillery fire.

== Description ==
The Clemson class was a repeat of the preceding Wickes class although more fuel capacity was added. The ships displaced 1,290 long tons (1,311 t) at standard load and 1,389 long tons (1,411 t) at deep load. They had an overall length of 314 feet 4 inches (95.8 m), a beam of 30 feet 11 inches (9.4 m) and a draught of 10 feet 3 inches (3.1 m). They had a crew of 6 officers and 108 enlisted men.

Performance differed radically between the ships of the class, often due to poor workmanship. The Clemson class was powered by two steam turbines, each driving one propeller shaft, using steam provided by four water-tube boilers. The turbines were designed to produce a total of 27,000 shaft horsepower (20,000 kW) intended to reach a speed of 35 knots (65 km/h; 40 mph). The ships carried a maximum of 371 long tons (377 t) of fuel oil which was intended gave them a range of 2,500 nautical miles (4,600 km; 2,900 mi) at 20 knots (37 km/h; 23 mph).

The ships were armed with four 4-inch (102 mm) guns in single mounts and were fitted with two 1-pounder guns for anti-aircraft defense. In many ships a shortage of 1-pounders caused them to be replaced by 3-inch (76 mm) guns. Their primary weapon, though, was their torpedo battery of a dozen 21 inch (533 mm) torpedo tubes in four triple mounts. They also carried a pair of depth charge rails. A "Y-gun" depth charge thrower was added to many ships.

== Construction and career ==
Kidder, named for Hugh Kidder, was launched 10 July 1919 by Bethlehem Shipbuilding Corporation, San Francisco, California; sponsored by Miss Ethel Murry Jonstone; and commissioned 7 February 1921. After shakedown along the coast, Kidder was assigned to Destroyer Division 34, Battle Fleet, at San Diego, California. From 1921 to 1924 she operated along the West Coast between Washington and the Panama Canal Zone engaging in training maneuvers, fleet problems, and gunnery exercises. The destroyer played a significant role in the development of naval warfare through using experimental torpedoes in exercises.

Kidder transited the Panama Canal during January 1924 for fleet concentrations in the Caribbean, returning San Diego 22 April. She continued her training operations before clearing San Francisco 15 April 1925 for a fleet problem and joint exercises off Hawaii. Kidder then accompanied the Battle Fleet to Samoa, Australia, and New Zealand before returning to Mare Island 26 September.

For the rest of her naval service she was almost constantly at sea, including winter fleet concentrations in the Caribbean during 1927 and a joint submarine exercise off Hawaii in the spring and summer of 1928.

== Fate ==
During her final year of service, Kidder operated out of San Diego and decommissioned there 18 March 1930. After scrapping, her materials were sold 31 October 1930 in accordance with the terms of the London Treaty limiting naval armament.

As of 2005, no other ship of the US Navy has been named Kidder.
