= Seavey's Island =

Island in Kittery, Maine, US

Coordinates: 43°4′44″N 70°44′3″W

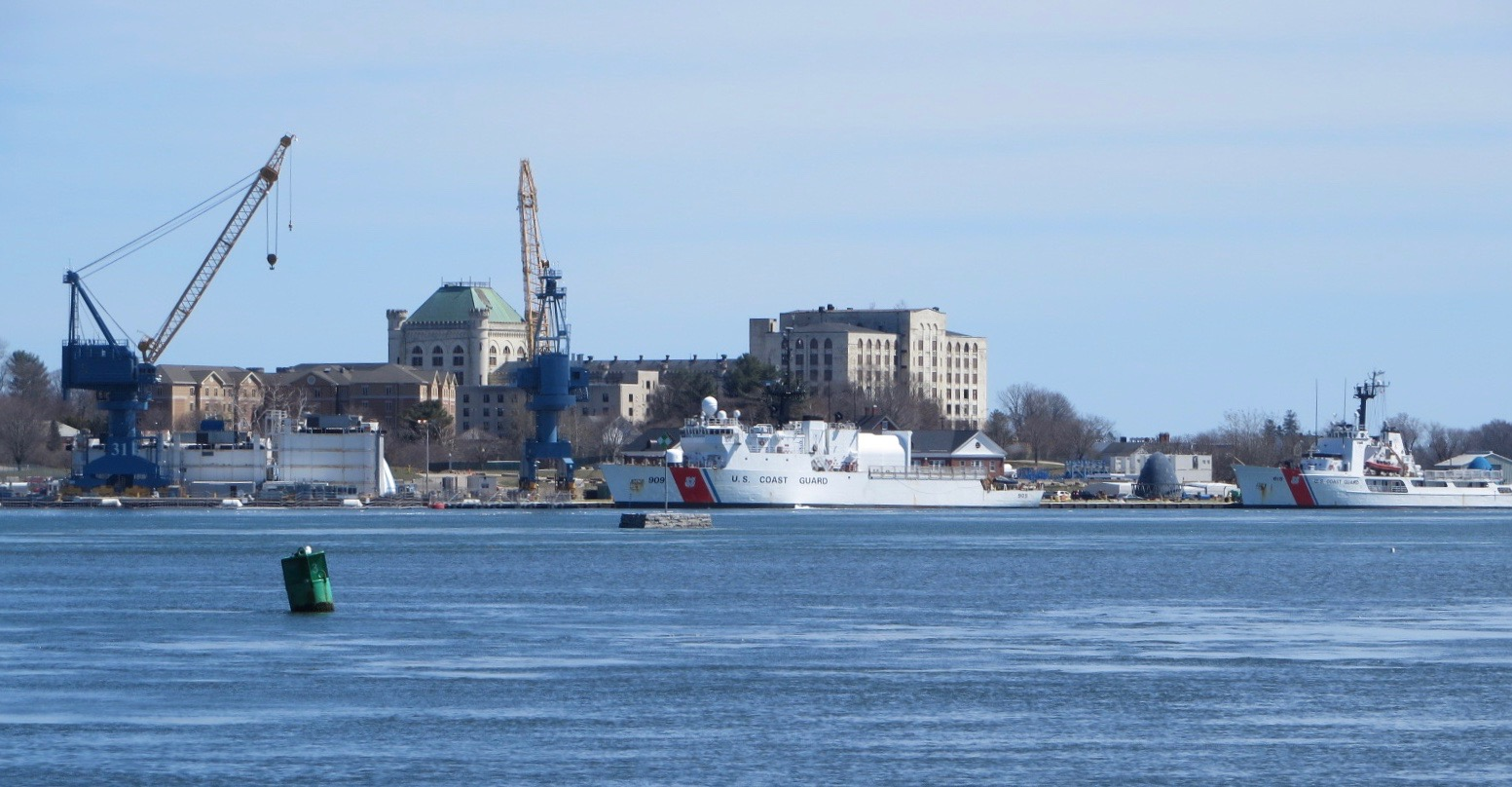
View of Seavey's Island from Prescott Park in Portsmouth, NH. The large building is the former naval prison.

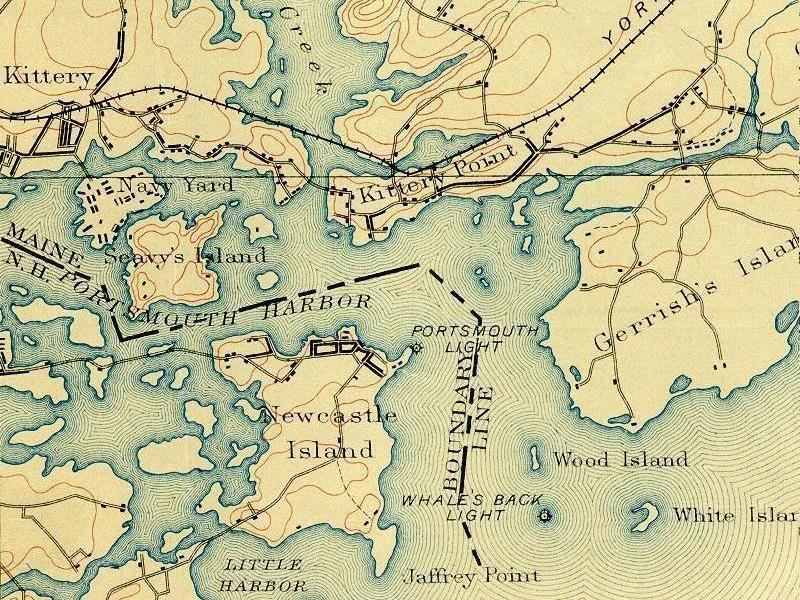
Seavy's Island in 1893

Seavey's Island, site of the Portsmouth Naval Shipyard, is located in the Piscataqua River in Kittery, Maine, United States, opposite Portsmouth, New Hampshire. It encompasses 278 acres (1.13 km^{2}).

== History ==
What is today called Seavey's Island was originally five separate islands conjoined to accommodate the Portsmouth Naval Shipyard. Colonists originally used the rocky islands for collecting wild berries or drying fish on fish flakes. When Secretary of the Navy Benjamin Stoddert decided to create the first federal shipyard in 1800, he authorized the purchase for $5,500 of Fernald's Island (also called Dennett's Island). The largest of the five, Seavey's Island, would be annexed in 1866 and give the grouping its familiar name. Approved by Congress in 1900, a 750-foot (230 m) granite drydock was built in the former gut between Fernald's and Seavey's islands. Clark's, Jamaica and another island were attached to Seavey's.

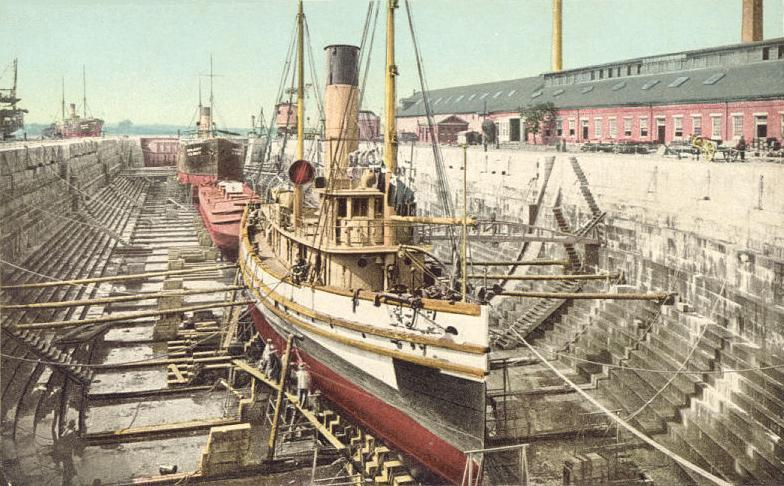
Shipyard dry dock, c. 1908, built in the former gut which separated Fernald's and Seavey's islands

Atop a hill on the southern end of Seavey's Island stood an earthwork defense called Fort Sullivan, built in 1775 to supplement Fort William and Mary and Fort McClary in the protection of Portsmouth Harbor during the Revolution and, later, War of 1812. After 1815 it was abandoned, then reactivated from 1861 until 1865 during the American Civil War as an 11 gun, 8 inch Rodman naval battery. Another early battery was to the west on Henderson's Point. But on July 22, 1905, the point was blown up in what was then the largest dynamite explosion ever attempted. Because it projected 540 feet (160 m) into the Piscataqua River channel, Henderson's Point created a navigational hazard for warships visiting the navy yard. Consequently, a cofferdam was constructed, behind which 220,000 cubic yards (170,000 m^{3}) of rock and 50,000 cubic yards (38,000 m^{3}) of soil were excavated. Explosives were detonated to remove the rest, with debris flying 170 feet (52 m) in the air. Within seconds, the river was widened by 350 feet (110 m).

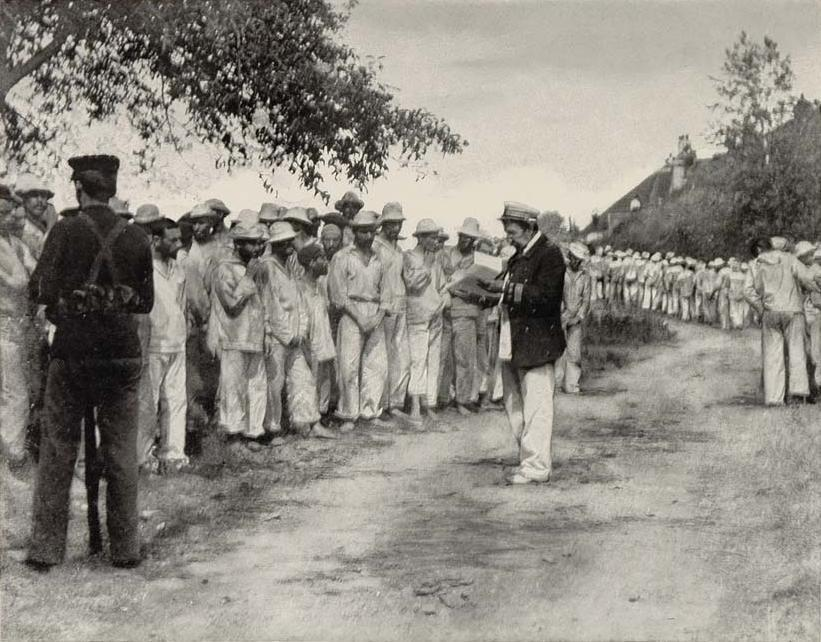
Spanish Navy prisoners of war arriving at Seavey's Island in 1898

In 1908, the Portsmouth Naval Prison was completed on the southern side of Seavey's Island at the former site of Camp Long, a stockade named for Secretary of the Navy John Long, where 1,612 prisoners of war from the Battle of Santiago de Cuba were confined from July 11 to mid-September 1898 during the Spanish–American War. Camp Heywood, a Marine camp named after Colonel Charles Heywood, was located just north of the naval prison. It was occupied after the 1st Battalion's return from Cuba in late August until September 21, 1898. According to the National Trust for Historic Preservation, the Portsmouth Naval Shipyard has 62 buildings listed on the National Register of Historic Places.

Seavey's Island was the subject of a border dispute between New Hampshire and Maine in 2001, in which New Hampshire asserted that the island lay within the borders of New Hampshire. The State of New Hampshire brought suit against Maine in the Supreme Court, but the Supreme Court held that New Hampshire was estopped from contesting a previous 1977 boundary determination that Maine had jurisdiction over the island, and dismissed the complaint.

== Sites of interest ==
- Portsmouth Naval Shipyard Museum (Building 31)

== See also ==
- Portsmouth Athenaeum
- List of islands of Maine
