= List of battlecruisers of the United States =

Ships of the United States Navy

Ships in current service
- Current ships

Ships grouped alphabetically
- A–B; C; D–F; G–H; I–K; L; M; N–O; P; Q–R; S; T–V; W–Z

Ships grouped by type
- Aircraft carriers; Airships; Amphibious warfare ships; Auxiliaries; Battlecruisers; Battleships; Cruisers; Destroyers; Destroyer escorts; Destroyer leaders; Escort carriers; Frigates; Hospital ships; Littoral combat ships; Mine warfare vessels; Monitors; Oilers; Patrol vessels; Registered civilian vessels; Sailing frigates; Steam frigates; Steam gunboats; Ships of the line; Sloops of war; Submarines; Torpedo boats; Torpedo retrievers; Unclassified miscellaneous; Yard and district craft

The United States Navy began building a series of battlecruisers in the 1920s, more than a decade after their slower and less heavily armed armored cruisers had been rendered obsolete by the UK Royal Navy's Invincible-class battlecruisers. Construction of these ships was abandoned under the terms of an armaments limitation treaty, though two were completed as aircraft carriers. The US Navy subsequently ordered six "large cruisers"—which are often considered battlecruisers by some historians—in 1940, of which only two entered service.

At first unconvinced of the importance of the superior speed of the British battlecruisers, the US Navy changed its position after evaluating the new type of ship in fleet exercises and Naval War College wargames, and after the Japanese acquisition of four Kongō-class battlecruisers in the early 1910s. The Secretary of the Navy initially refused the General Board's suggested procurement of several battlecruisers, but fleet exercises revealed that the Navy lacked forces that could effectively find and track an enemy fleet in any weather, and a consensus gradually emerged that battlecruisers would be ideal for this role. Battlecruisers were effective when concentrating their fire on an enemy fleet's leading ships, as the Japanese armored cruisers had done to the Russians at the Battle of Tsushima in 1905. Another role envisioned was tracking down and destroying enemy commerce raiders. British experience during the Battle of the Falkland Islands in late 1914 and the Battle of Dogger Bank the following year, where British battlecruisers caught and destroyed German armored cruisers, confirmed all these capabilities.

When Congress authorized a large naval building program in 1916, six Lexington-class battlecruisers were included. None were completed before the arms-limiting Washington Naval Treaty was ratified in 1922; four were broken up on the slipway and two were converted into the aircraft carriers Lexington (CV-2) and Saratoga (CV-3). The treaty forestalled any further development of battlecruisers for the next decade and a half.

A number of countries experimented with "cruiser-killer" ships in the late 1930s that were designed to destroy the post-London Naval Treaty heavy cruisers. These designs were all roughly equivalent being scaled-up versions of heavy cruisers, being formally designated as battlecruisers by the Dutch and Soviets and as large cruisers by the Japanese and Americans. The US Navy's main impetus for the Alaska class was the threat posed by Japanese cruisers raiding its lines of communication in the event of war. Heavy cruisers were also the most likely surface threat to aircraft carriers making independent raids, so a cruiser-killer was also an ideal carrier escort. Reports of a Japanese equivalent (Note: Jane's Fighting Ships thought that this battlecruiser of the mythical Chichibu class would have six 12-inch guns and 30 knots (56 km/h; 35 mph) speed packed into a 15,000-long-ton (15,000 t) ship.) reinforced the Navy's desire for these ships. Two were commissioned in time to serve during the last year of World War II, but were decommissioned two years after the war.

== Key ==
Main guns	The number and type of the main battery guns
Armor	Waterline belt thickness
Displacement	Ship displacement at full load
Propulsion	Number of shafts, type of propulsion system, and top speed generated
Service	The dates work began and finished on the ship and its ultimate fate
Laid down	The date the keel began to be assembled
Launched	The date the ship was launched
Commissioned	The date the ship was commissioned

== Lexington class ==
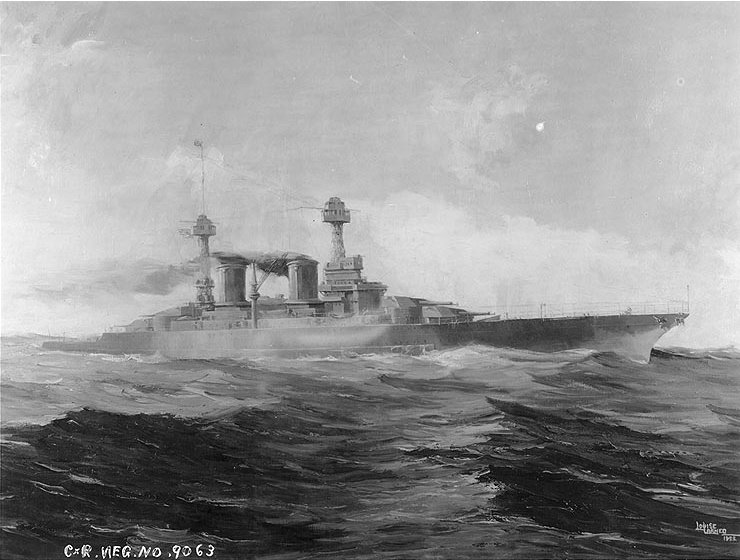
A 1922 painting by Louise Larned depicting the definitive design of the Lexington class, with eight 16-inch guns and two funnels

The design of the Lexington-class battlecruisers was approved on 30 June 1916 and six were planned as part of the massive 1916 building program, but their construction was repeatedly postponed in favor of escort ships and anti-submarine vessels. The original design mounted ten 14-inch (356 mm) and sixteen 5-inch (127 mm) guns on a lightly armored hull with a maximum speed of 35 knots (65 km/h; 40 mph). The General Board regarded the design's firepower as inadequate and took the opportunity offered by the postponement to order a redesign to improve the ships' armament to include eight 16-inch (406 mm) and sixteen 6-inch (152 mm) guns. After the Americans entered World War I in April 1917, the Royal Navy furnished more information from its analyses of the Battle of Jutland, in which three British battlecruisers were destroyed by magazine explosions, and provided detailed information on the heavily armored design of the Admiral-class battlecruisers then under construction. The General Board then re-evaluated the design and greatly increased the armor protection, at the cost of reducing the maximum speed to 33 knots (61 km/h; 38 mph). Anti-torpedo bulges, additional torpedo bulkheads and a general increase in armor thicknesses increased the design's beam by 11 feet (3.4 m) and increased its displacement by over 7,000 long tons (7,100 t).

While four of the ships were eventually cancelled and scrapped on their slipways to comply with the terms of the Washington Naval Treaty, Lexington and Saratoga, the two most advanced ships, were converted into the United States' first fleet carriers. In World War II, Lexington conducted several raids on Japanese bases before being sunk during the Battle of Coral Sea in May 1942. Saratoga sank the Japanese aircraft carrier Ryūjō during the Battle of the Eastern Solomons three months later, then supported a number of American operations in the Pacific before being attached to the British Eastern Fleet for operations in the Indian Ocean. Though she was torpedoed twice, Saratoga survived the war, and was destroyed as a target ship during Operation Crossroads, a series of atomic bomb tests at Bikini Atoll in mid-1946.

Ship	Main guns	Armor	Displacement	Propulsion	Service			
Ship	Main guns	Armor	Displacement	Propulsion	Laid down	Launched	Commissioned	Fate
USS Lexington (CV-2, ex-CC-1)	8 × 16 in (406 mm)	7 in (178 mm)	44,638 long tons (45,354 t)	4 screws, turbo-electric, 33 kn (61 km/h; 38 mph)	8 January 1921	3 October 1925	14 December 1927	Sunk during the Battle of the Coral Sea, 8 May 1942
USS Constellation (CC-2)	8 × 16 in (406 mm)	7 in (178 mm)	44,638 long tons (45,354 t)	4 screws, turbo-electric, 33 kn (61 km/h; 38 mph)	8 August 1920	Cancelled 17 August 1923 and sold for scrap		
USS Saratoga (CV-3, ex-CC-3)	8 × 16 in (406 mm)	7 in (178 mm)	44,638 long tons (45,354 t)	4 screws, turbo-electric, 33 kn (61 km/h; 38 mph)	25 September 1920	7 April 1925	16 November 1927	Sunk as a target ship, 25 July 1946
USS Ranger (CC-4)	8 × 16 in (406 mm)	7 in (178 mm)	44,638 long tons (45,354 t)	4 screws, turbo-electric, 33 kn (61 km/h; 38 mph)	23 June 1921	Cancelled 17 August 1923 and sold for scrap, 8 November 1923		
USS Constitution (CC-5)	8 × 16 in (406 mm)	7 in (178 mm)	44,638 long tons (45,354 t)	4 screws, turbo-electric, 33 kn (61 km/h; 38 mph)	25 September 1920	Cancelled 17 August 1923 and sold for scrap		
USS United States (CC-6)	8 × 16 in (406 mm)	7 in (178 mm)	44,638 long tons (45,354 t)	4 screws, turbo-electric, 33 kn (61 km/h; 38 mph)	25 September 1920	Cancelled 17 August 1923 and sold for scrap, 25 October 1923		

== Alaska class ==
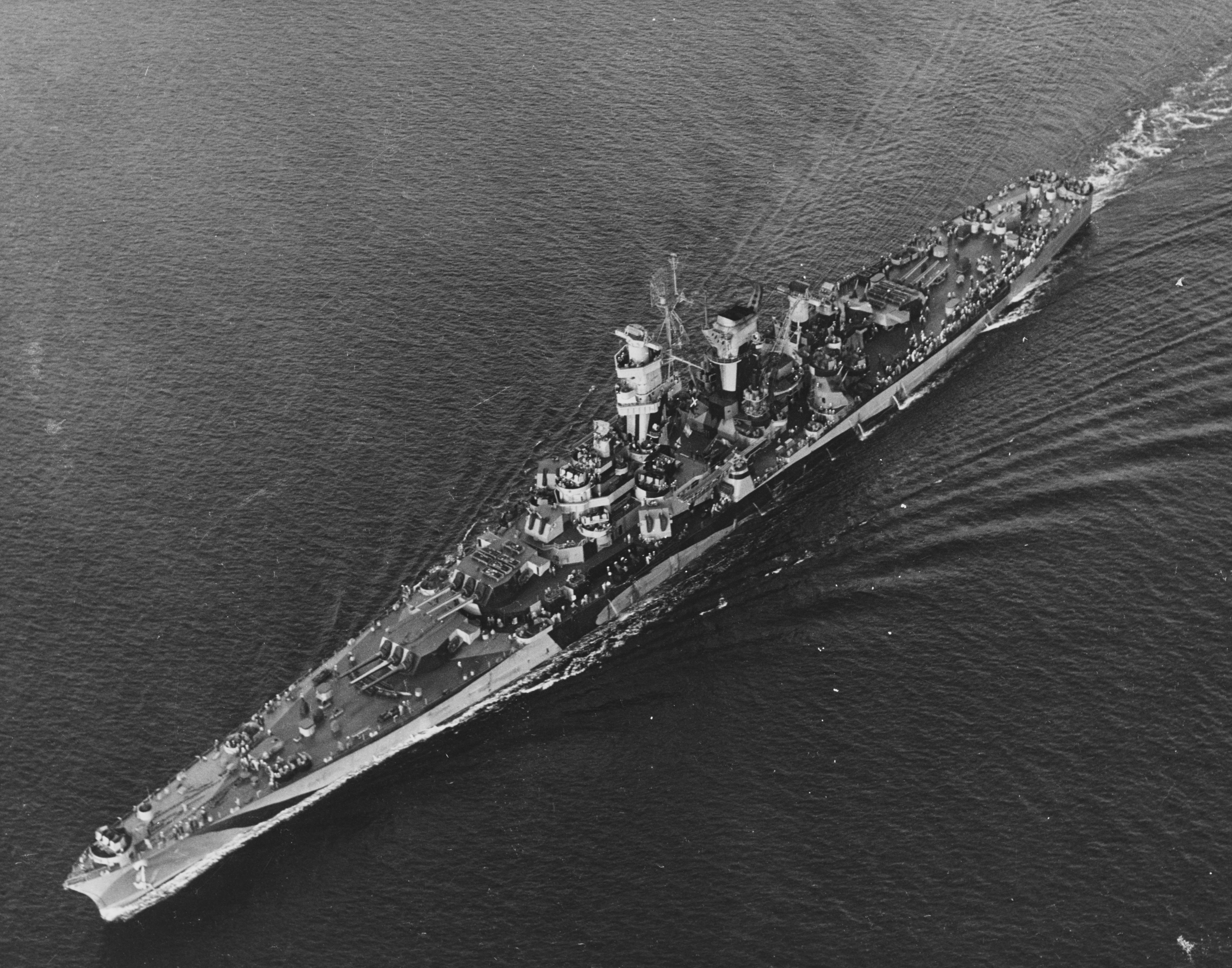
Aerial view of Guam on 13 November 1944

The Alaska-class cruisers were six very large cruisers ordered on 9 September 1940. They were known, popularly and by some historians, as "battlecruisers", although the Navy and at least one prominent historian discouraged describing them as such and gave them the hull symbol for large cruisers (CB). All were named after territories or insular areas of the United States, unlike battleships, generally named for states, or cruisers, named for cities. (Note: The Territories of Alaska and Hawaii were admitted to the Union as the forty-ninth and fiftieth states in 1959.) Initial design work for a "cruiser-killer" began in 1938, although the design was not finalized until June 1941. Of the six ships ordered in September 1940, only three were laid down; two of these were completed, and the third's construction was suspended on 16 April 1947 when she was 84% complete.

Alaska and Guam served for the last year of World War II as bombardment ships and fast carrier escorts. Once the two ships reached Bayonne, New Jersey in late 1945 and early 1946, they never left port again. Numerous plans to convert Hawaii into a guided-missile cruiser or a large command ship in the years after the war were fruitless, and she was sold for scrap in 1959, two years before her sisters.

Ship	Main guns	Armor	Displacement	Propulsion	Service			
Ship	Main guns	Armor	Displacement	Propulsion	Laid down	Launched	Commissioned	Fate
USS Alaska (CB-1)	9 × 12 in (305 mm)	9 inches (229 mm)	34,253 long tons (34,803 t)	4 screws, steam turbines 33 kn (61 km/h; 38 mph)	17 December 1941	15 August 1943	17 June 1944	Sold for scrap, 30 June 1961
USS Guam (CB-2)	9 × 12 in (305 mm)	9 inches (229 mm)	34,253 long tons (34,803 t)	4 screws, steam turbines 33 kn (61 km/h; 38 mph)	2 February 1942	12 November 1943	17 September 1944	Sold for scrap, 24 May 1961
USS Hawaii (CB-3)	9 × 12 in (305 mm)	9 inches (229 mm)	34,253 long tons (34,803 t)	4 screws, steam turbines 33 kn (61 km/h; 38 mph)	20 December 1943	3 November 1945	—	Sold for scrap, 15 April 1959
USS Philippines (CB-4)	9 × 12 in (305 mm)	9 inches (229 mm)	34,253 long tons (34,803 t)	4 screws, steam turbines 33 kn (61 km/h; 38 mph)	—	—	—	Cancelled 24 June 1943, before construction began
USS Puerto Rico (CB-5)	9 × 12 in (305 mm)	9 inches (229 mm)	34,253 long tons (34,803 t)	4 screws, steam turbines 33 kn (61 km/h; 38 mph)	—	—	—	Cancelled 24 June 1943, before construction began
USS Samoa (CB-6)	9 × 12 in (305 mm)	9 inches (229 mm)	34,253 long tons (34,803 t)	4 screws, steam turbines 33 kn (61 km/h; 38 mph)	—	—	—	Cancelled 24 June 1943, before construction began
