= USS Hawaii (CB-3) =

Never-completed third member of the US Navy Alaska-class large cruisers

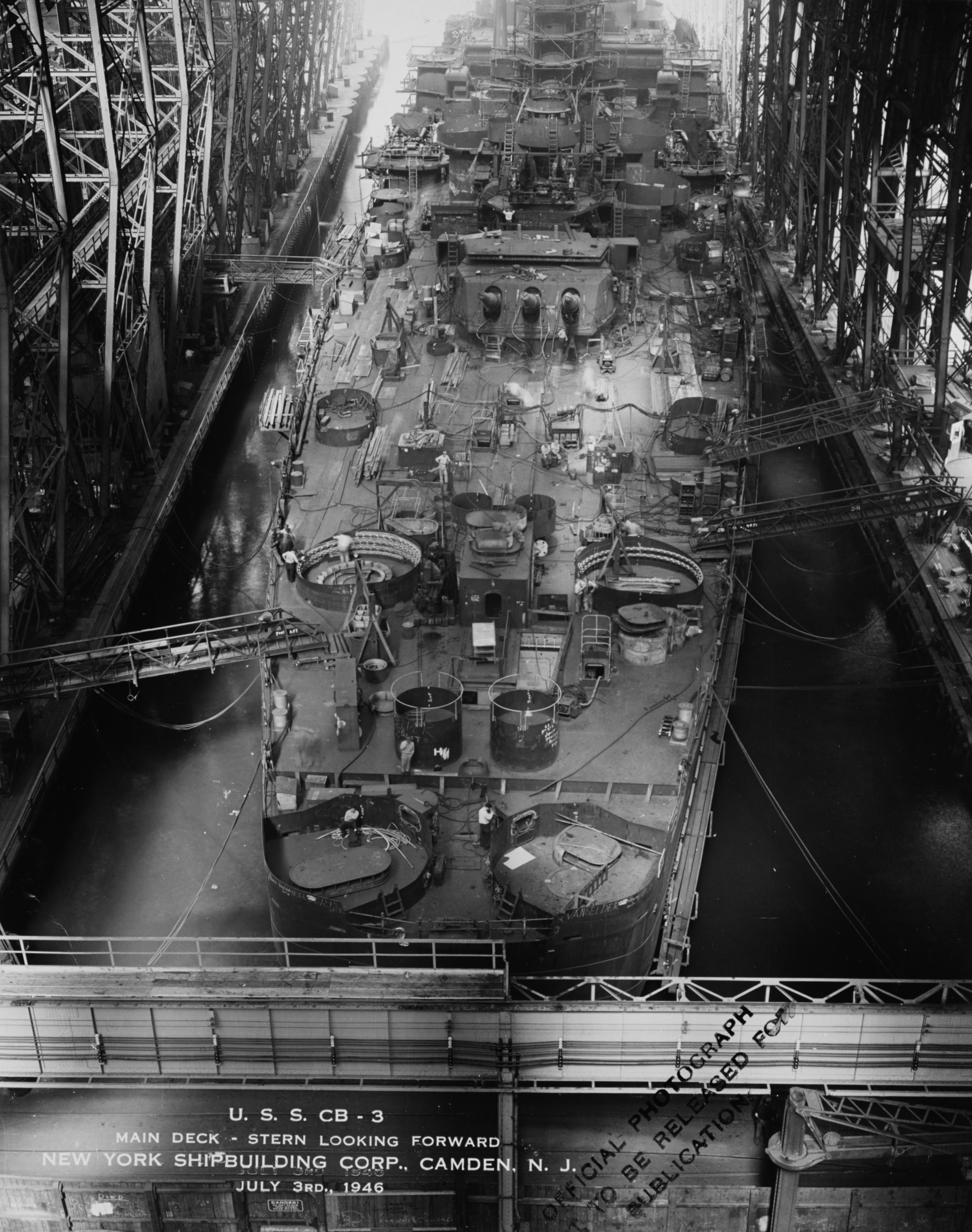
- Hawaii fitting out prior to the suspension of her construction in February 1947

History

United States
- Name: Hawaii
- Namesake: Territory of Hawaii
- Ordered: September 1940
- Builder: New York Shipbuilding Corporation, Camden, New Jersey
- Laid down: 20 December 1943
- Launched: 3 November 1945
- Sponsored by: Elizabeth Farrington
- Stricken: 9 June 1958
- Fate: Sold for scrap, 15 April 1959

General characteristics (as designed)
- Class & type: Alaska-class large cruiser
- Displacement: 29,779 long tons (30,257 t) (standard); 34,253 long tons (34,803 t) (deep load)
- Length: 808 ft 6 in (246.4 m)
- Beam: 91 ft 1 in (27.8 m)
- Draft: 27 ft 1 in (8.3 m); 32 ft (9.8 m) (full load)
- Installed power: 8 Babcock & Wilcox boilers; 150,000 shp (110,000 kW)
- Propulsion: 4 shafts, 4 steam turbines
- Speed: 33 knots (61 km/h; 38 mph)
- Endurance: 12,000 nmi (22,000 km; 14,000 mi) at 15 knots (28 km/h; 17 mph)
- Armament: 9 × 12 in (305 mm) guns; 12 × 5 in (127 mm) guns; 56 × 40 mm (1.6 in) AA guns; 34 × 20 mm (0.8 in) AA guns
- Armor: Waterline belt: 5–9 in (127–229 mm); Deck: 3.8–4 in (97–102 mm); Barbettes: 11–13 in (279–330 mm); Gun turrets: 5–12.8 in (127–325 mm)
- Aircraft carried: 4 × floatplanes
- Aviation facilities: 2 × hangars; 2 × catapults

USS Hawaii (CB-3) (Note: Hawaii was never commissioned into the United States Navy, so it never carried the official USS marker before its formal name. That designation has been included in this article's title to adhere to Wikipedia naming conventions.) was intended to be the third member of the Alaska-class large cruisers. It was the first United States Navy ship to be named after the then-Territory of Hawaii. Because Hawaii's construction was delayed by higher-priority ships like aircraft carriers, her keel was not laid until December 1943, about two years after her sister ship Guam.

Hawaii was launched in late 1945, but post-war budget cutbacks necessitated her cancellation in 1947. The Alaska-class large cruisers were seen as requiring a crew almost as large as a South Dakota or Iowa-class battleship, while the armor and protection of the capital ship-sized Hawaii was no better than a Baltimore-class cruiser and this was particularly significant as the underwater protection designed into Hawaii was poor. In a famous Proceedings article in January 1949, Frank Uhlig dismissed the performance of the class in 1944–1945 and concluded the battlecruiser had no place in the postwar USN. For a time, the US Navy planned to convert the ship into the United States's first guided missile cruiser, but this did not come to fruition. A conversion to a large command ship was later contemplated and planning went far enough that money was allocated in the 1952 budget for this purpose. However, with one command ship already completed, Northampton, and a second already chosen, Wright, no work was started upon Hawaii. Having been laid up for twelve years, the still incomplete ship was towed to breakers to be scrapped in 1959.

== Design and description ==
The initial impetus for the design of the Alaska class came from the commerce-raiding abilities of German and Japanese ships; the three Deutschland-class cruisers, the two Scharnhorst-class battleships and Japan's large force of both heavy and light cruisers. By the time that they were built, their role had expanded to protect carrier groups. It was thought that the class's bigger guns, greater size and higher speed would give them a marked advantage in this role over heavy cruisers and they would also provide insurance against reports that Japan was building "super cruisers" more powerful than American cruisers limited by the London Naval Treaty. (Note: Japan actually developed plans for two of the "super cruisers" in 1941—the Design B-65 cruisers—mostly in response to the new Alaska ships. They were never ordered due to the greater need for carriers.)

Hawaii was 808 feet 6 inches (246.43 m) long overall and had a beam of 91 feet 1 inch (27.8 m) and a draft of 31 feet 10 inches (9.7 m). She displaced 29,779 long tons (30,257 t) as designed and up to 34,253 long tons (34,803 t) at deep load. The ship was powered by four General Electric geared steam turbine sets, each driving one propeller and eight oil-fired Babcock & Wilcox boilers rated at 150,000 shaft horsepower (110,000 kW) giving a top speed of 33 knots (61 km/h; 38 mph). The ship had a cruising range of 12,000 nautical miles (22,000 km; 14,000 mi) at a speed of 15 knots (28 km/h; 17 mph). She carried four floatplanes, housed in two hangars, with a pair of aircraft catapults mounted amidships.

The ship was armed with a main battery of nine 12 inch (305 mm) L/50 Mark 8 guns in three triple-gun turrets, two in a superfiring pair forward and one aft of the superstructure. (Note: L/50 refers to the length of the gun in terms of calibers. An L/50 gun is 50 times long as it is in bore diameter.) The secondary battery consisted of twelve 5-inch (127 mm) L/38 dual-purpose guns in six twin turrets. Two were placed on the centerline superfiring over the main battery turrets, fore and aft; the remaining four turrets were placed on the corners of the superstructure. The light anti-aircraft battery consisted of 56 quad-mounted 40 mm (1.6 in) Bofors guns and 34 single-mounted 20 mm (0.79 in) Oerlikon guns. A pair of Mk 34 gun directors aided gunlaying for the main battery, while two Mk 37 directors controlled the 5-inch guns and a Mk 57 director aided the 40 mm guns. The main armored belt was 9 in (229 mm) thick, while the gun turrets had 12.8 in (325 mm) thick faces. The main armored deck was 4 in (102 mm) thick.

== Construction, conversion proposals and eventual fate ==
Along with the five Montana-class battleships and the final three Alaska-class cruisers, the construction of Hawaii was suspended in May 1942 before work began. This freed materials and facilities so that they could be used to build additional ships which could be completed faster and were needed in the war zones, like anti-submarine escorts. Over 4,000 long tons (4,100 t) of steel plates and shapes which had been destined for Hawaii was redirected to other ships in July 1942. However, Hawaii was added back onto the construction queue on 25 May 1943, unlike CB-4 through CB-6, which were cancelled on 24 June 1943. Her keel was laid on 20 December 1943, and she was finally launched on 3 November 1945, about two years after Guam. (Note: Garzke and Dulin, p. 184 give a launching date of 11 March 1945, but an official U.S. Navy photograph, along with Hawaii's DANFS entry and Gardiner and Cheasneau, p. 122, appear to directly disprove this.) The ship was sponsored by Mary P. Farrington, the wife of the delegate from the Territory of Hawaii to the United States House of Representatives, Joseph Farrington. After her launch, little, if any, work was done before construction was halted in either February or April 1947 (Note: "USS Hawaii (CB-3); 1940 program – never completed" gives 17 February; Garzke and Dulin, p. 184 gives 16 April.) due to the reduction in defense expenditures after World War II; the ship was 82.4% complete when work was halted. The turrets for the main battery had been fitted and the superstructure was mostly finished, although the former were removed when the ship was moved into the reserve fleet at the Philadelphia Naval Shipyard.

=== Aircraft carrier conversion ===
Hawaii was considered under project SCB 26 for a conversion to an aircraft carrier, with an aircraft crane and twin aircraft catapults to be added on the stern of the ship. The conversion, as envisioned, would have looked similar to a completed Graf Zeppelin-class aircraft carrier. The ship would have also been able to launch the JB-2 "Loon" cruise missile from a hydraulic catapult installed on her forward flight deck. The conversion was authorized in the same year (1948) and was scheduled to be completed in 1950; the ship's classification was changed to CBG-3 to reflect the planned overhaul. However, the conversion was canceled in 1949, along with any other plans for surface ships equipped with ballistic missiles, due to the volatility of the rocket fuels and the shortcomings of the guidance systems that were available at that time.

=== Guided-missile cruiser designs ===
Similar to the unfinished battleship Kentucky, (Note: This similar proposal planned to take Kentucky, an incomplete Iowa-class battleship whose construction had also been halted, and convert her into the first guided-missile battleship (BBG). However, this conversion never materialized and Kentucky was scrapped in 1958.) Hawaii was considered for a conversion to be a test platform for the development of guided missiles in September 1946. Designated CB(SW), the cruisers' gun armament would have consisted of sixteen 3-inch (76 mm) L70 guns in eight dual mounts. Most missiles would have been mounted toward the bow, while two "missile launching pits" would be located near the stern. For this task, no armor would have been needed and previously installed armor was to be taken off the ship when required. These plans never came to fruition, so Hawaii remained in the Reserve Fleet, still incomplete.

Two years later, in 1948, a similar conversion plan was put forth. This plan, designated project SCB 26A, proposed that Hawaii be converted into a Ballistic Guided Missile Ship. This plan called for Hawaii to be completed with 12 vertical launchers for U.S.-made V-2 short-range ballistic missiles and 6 launchers for the SSM-N-2 Triton surface-to-surface cruise missile. Triton was an attempt to give the Navy a reliable cruise missile that it could launch off of its ships. The design process began with an approval from the U.S. Navy in September 1946. After "formulating performance objectives and possible design baselines", the designers settled on attempting to fit a 36,000-pound (16,000 kg) ramjet-powered cruiser missile onto solid-fuel rocket boosters that could carry the missile 2,000 nautical miles (3,700 km; 2,300 mi) at Mach 1.6–2.5 in 1950. After lowering the ambitious goals to more realistic levels in 1955, a fully operational version was expected by 1965, but with tests for the SSM-N-9/RGM-15 Regulus II planned for that year and the up-and-coming UGM-27 Polaris submarine-launched cruise missile, the project was terminated in 1957. One source has a variation of this scheme, with the developmental XPM (Experimental Prototype Missile) from Operation Bumblebee replacing the Triton launchers. XPM eventually led to the RIM-8 Talos surface-to-air missile.

=== Large command ship ===
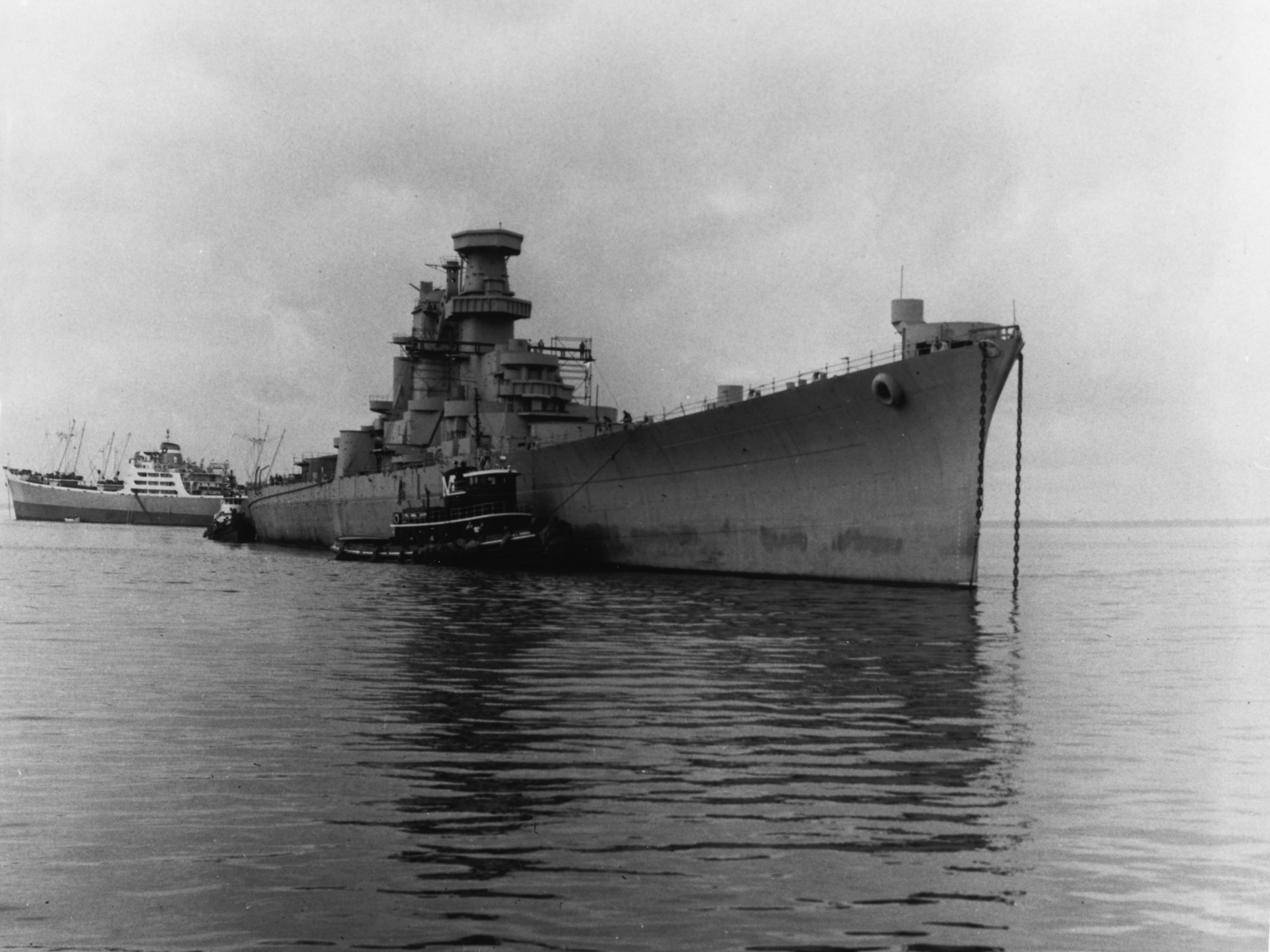
Hawaii being towed to the breakers

Yet another conversion of Hawaii, this time to a "large command ship", was contemplated under project SCB 83 from August 1951. In this role, she would have been similar to Northampton, but larger. This conversion would have boasted expansive flag facilities and fully capable radar and communication systems for commanding carrier task forces, though there would have been no facilities for amphibious operations. Armament would have consisted of sixteen 5-inch/54-caliber Mark 42 guns in single mounts; this gun size was specified because 3-inch/50-caliber guns were believed to be too light. Two radars would have been mounted: an AN/SPS-2 on top of a forward tower and an AN/SPS-8 on the aft superstructure. In addition, an SC-2 was to be mounted on top of a short tower aft of the stack (though forward of the SPS-8); this would have been used for "tropospheric scatter communications".

Two Mk37/25 fire-control directors were planned, both fore and aft of the superstructure. The conversion plans were authorized, and her classification was changed to CBC-1 to reflect this on 26 February 1952. Money to begin the project was included in the 1952 budget, but the only work done on the ship was the removal of the 12" turrets, as it was intended that experience from Northampton should be analyzed before a full conversion. However, when it was seen that a smaller and cheaper ship—like the light carrier Wright—could do the same duty, the Hawaii project was cancelled in 1953. She reverted to her original designation of CB-3 on 9 September 1954. (Note: The Dictionary of American Naval Fighting Ships notes this date as 9 October 1954.)

=== Polaris study ===
In February 1957, a study entitled "Polaris Study–CB-3" was published, proposing that Hawaii be stripped of all her guns in favor of twenty Polaris missiles, mounted in the hull vertically in roughly the same location as the third main turret would have been located, two Talos surface-to-air missile (SAM) launchers, one each fore and aft, two Tartar SAMs mounted on either side of the superstructure and a single ASROC anti-submarine weapon mounted where the second main turret would have been placed. Nothing further was done with the study.

=== Disposal ===
On 9 June 1958, Hawaii was struck from the Naval Vessel Register and the ship was sold to the Boston Metals Company of Baltimore on 15 April 1959. The still-incomplete Hawaii was towed to Baltimore, arriving there on 6 January 1960 and was subsequently broken up for scrap.

== Sources ==
- Breyer, Siegfried (1973). Battleships and Battle Cruisers, 1905–1970. Garden City, New York: Doubleday. ISBN 0-385-07247-3. OCLC 702840.
- Dulin, Robert O. Jr.; Garzke, William H. Jr. (1976). Battleships: United States Battleships in World War II. Annapolis, Maryland: Naval Institute Press. ISBN 1-55750-174-2. OCLC 29387525.
- Friedman, Norman (1984). U.S. Cruisers: An Illustrated Design History. Annapolis, Maryland: Naval Institute Press. ISBN 0-87021-718-6.
- Gardiner, Robert; Chesneau, Roger (1980). Conway's All the World's Fighting Ships 1922–1946. Annapolis, Maryland: Naval Institute Press. ISBN 0-87021-913-8. OCLC 18121784.
- "Hawaii". Dictionary of American Naval Fighting Ships. Navy Department, Naval History & Heritage Command.
- Parsch, Andreas (2003). "SSM-N-2". designation-systems.net.
- Scarpaci, Wayne (April 2008). Iowa Class Battleships and Alaska Class Large Cruisers Conversion Projects 1942–1964: An Illustrated Technical Reference. Nimble Books LLC. ISBN 978-1-934840-38-2.
- "USS Hawaii (CB-3); 1940 program – never completed". Navy Department, Naval History & Heritage Command. 2000. Archived from the original on 13 January 2015.
- Whitley, M. J. (1995). Cruisers of World War Two: An International Encyclopedia. Annapolis, Maryland: Naval Institute Press. ISBN 1-55750-141-6. OCLC 34089382.
