= CB-4 =

CB-4 could refer to:

- USS Philippines (CB-4), a never-finished Alaska-class cruiser
- The film CB4
- The Cambridge postal area
