= B65 =

B65 or B-65 may refer to:

- B65 (New York City bus) in Brooklyn
- Sicilian, Richter-Rauzer, Encyclopaedia of Chess Openings code
- a 65 Billionen parameters LLaMA (Large Language Model Meta AI)
- B-65 Atlas, an American missile
- Design B-65 cruiser, a planned class of ships for Japan in World War II
