= Governor McMillin =

Governor McMillin may refer to:

- Benton McMillin (1845–1933), 27th Governor of Tennessee
- George McMillin (1889–1983), 38th Naval Governor of Guam
