= Annabel Parlett McMillin =

American First Lady of Guam

First Lady of Guam
- In role April 20, 1940 – December 10, 1941
- Governor: George McMillin

Personal details
- Died: 1968
- Spouse: George McMillin
- Children: 1
- Occupation: First Lady of Guam
- Other names: Annabel Parlett, Annabel P. McMillin

Annabel Parlett McMillin is an American former First Lady of Guam.

== Early life ==
McMillin's parents are Mr. and Mrs. David O. Parlett.

== Career ==
In 1940, when George McMillin was appointed the military Governor of Guam, McMillin became the First Lady of Guam on April 20, 1940, until December 10, 1941.

On November 12, 1943, McMillin sponsored the launching of USS Guam (CB-2) in Camden, New Jersey.

In May 1945, McMillin sponsored the launching of SS American Victory at California Shipbuilding Corporation in Los Angeles Harbor, California. McMillin's daughter was a matron of honor at the launching.

== Personal life ==
On October 23, 1912, McMillin married George McMillin, who became a Naval Governor of Guam, at her parents' home in Annapolis, Maryland. They have one daughter, Anne. In December 1941, McMillin's husband surrendered to the Japanese and became a prisoner of war. McMillin and her family lived in places including Long Beach, California and Guam.

McMillin's daughter Anne attended Mrs. Porter's School for Girls in Long Beach, California, the American School in Guam, and the Long Beach Junior College for one semester. In 1942, she won a partial scholarship to Ogontz Junior College in Pennsylvania.

In 1968, McMillin died. McMillin is interred at Forest Lawn Memorial Park in Cypress, California.
