= Plaza de España (Hagåtña) =

- U.S. National Register of Historic Places
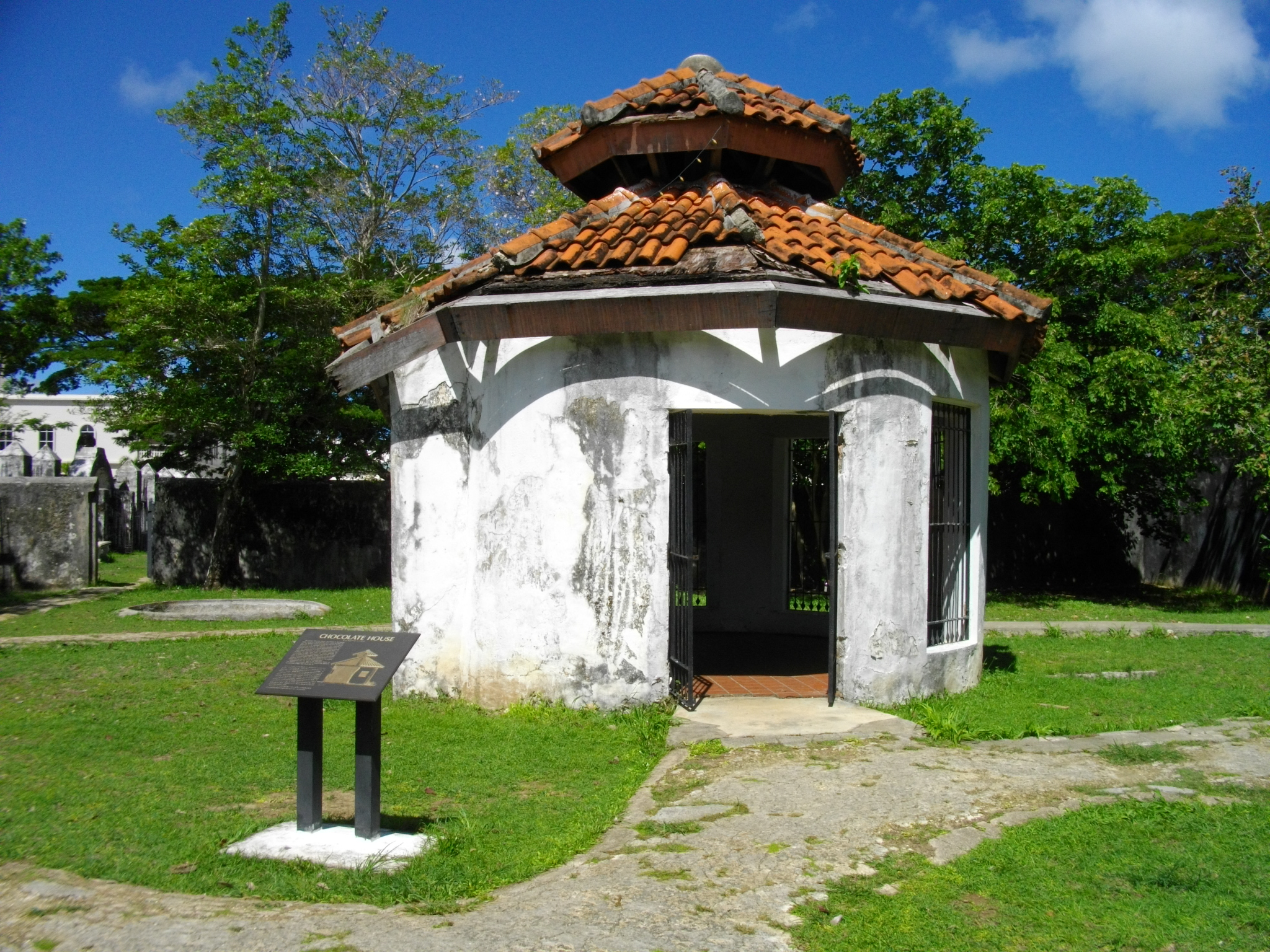
- The "Chocolate House"

- Location within Guam
- Location: Saylor St, Hagåtña, Guam
- Coordinates: 13°28′25.8″N 144°45′5.52″E
- Area: 0.4 acres (0.16 ha)
- Built: 1736
- Architectural style: Spanish style
- NRHP reference No.: 74002302
- Added to NRHP: May 1, 1974

The Plaza de España (Spain Square) located in central Hagåtña, the capital of the United States territory of Guam, was the location of the Governors Palace during the island's long period of Spanish occupation. Most of the palace was destroyed during the shelling of Hagåtña during the reconquest of Guam in World War II. There are three structures still standing including the three-arch gate to Almacen (Arsenal), the azotea or back porch, and the Chocolate House. The plaza was listed on the National Register of Historic Places in 1974.

== Overview ==
In the middle of Hagåtña, the Plaza de España served as the colonial Spanish Governor's Palace from 1734 until the invasion of World War II. The surviving or restored structures include the Azotea, Chocolate House, Tool Shed, Siesta Shed and Spanish Walls. The Governor's Palace housed the office and residence of the Spanish Governor. It was destroyed in 1944 during the liberation of Guam, but portions of the foundation may still be seen.

The Governor's Palace, called Casa Gobierno under Spanish rule, was reconstructed in 1885 to replace the original structure built in 1736. The two-story stone building featured a cantilevered balcony and clay tile roofing. Living quarters were upstairs while the first floor spaces were utilized as the office of the Sargento Mayor de la Plaza, weapons storerooms, and clerical offices.

American rule brought changes in the Palace, including pouring a cement floor and converting the lower storerooms into administrative office spaces. The second floor contained a reception area, the dining room, galleries, and the private residence of the governor and his family. The kitchen facilities and the servants' quarters were located in the rear of the Palace.

The elevated Azotea, also of stone construction, survived World War II. It was originally the Palace's open-air terrace porch, with a clay tile roof added after the war.

Under Spanish rule the Plaza de España served as the center stage for many government and civic activities on Guam. The principal structure in the complex of buildings, gardens, and a park, the Casa Gobierno, or Governor's Palace, was originally constructed in 1736, and was first occupied by colonial Spanish Governor Francisco Cardenas Pacheco.

The complex was originally named the Plaza de Magalahes (Governor's Plaza), and was later changed to Plaza de España. Its appearance has also changed during the years. In 1885 the original palace was replaced with a larger building by Governor Don Enrique Solano. After the Spanish–American War in 1898, when Guam became an American possession, the Plaza continued as the headquarters of the American administration and official residence of the Naval Governor.

Under American administration the plaza was expanded to include a baseball field and badminton court. Today the Kiosko (bandstand) stands in what was once the baseball field. World War II brought more changes to the Plaza. On December 10, 1941 after a brief battle in Agana, the Governor, Captain George J. McMillin, U.S.N, surrendered the island to the Japanese from the Plaza. Later, while the seat of Japanese occupation, the Plaza was extensively damaged by the July 1944 bombardment of Agana shortly before Guam's liberation. The existing structures were subsequently repaired but an extensive restoration project was completed only in 1980.

The Plaza de España today continues to be the site for numerous social and civic functions, including the inauguration of the Governor of Guam – emphasizing its significance in Guam's history.

== See also ==
- National Register of Historic Places listings in Guam
