= Alaska-class cruiser =

Late WWII-era class of "large cruisers" of the U.S. Navy

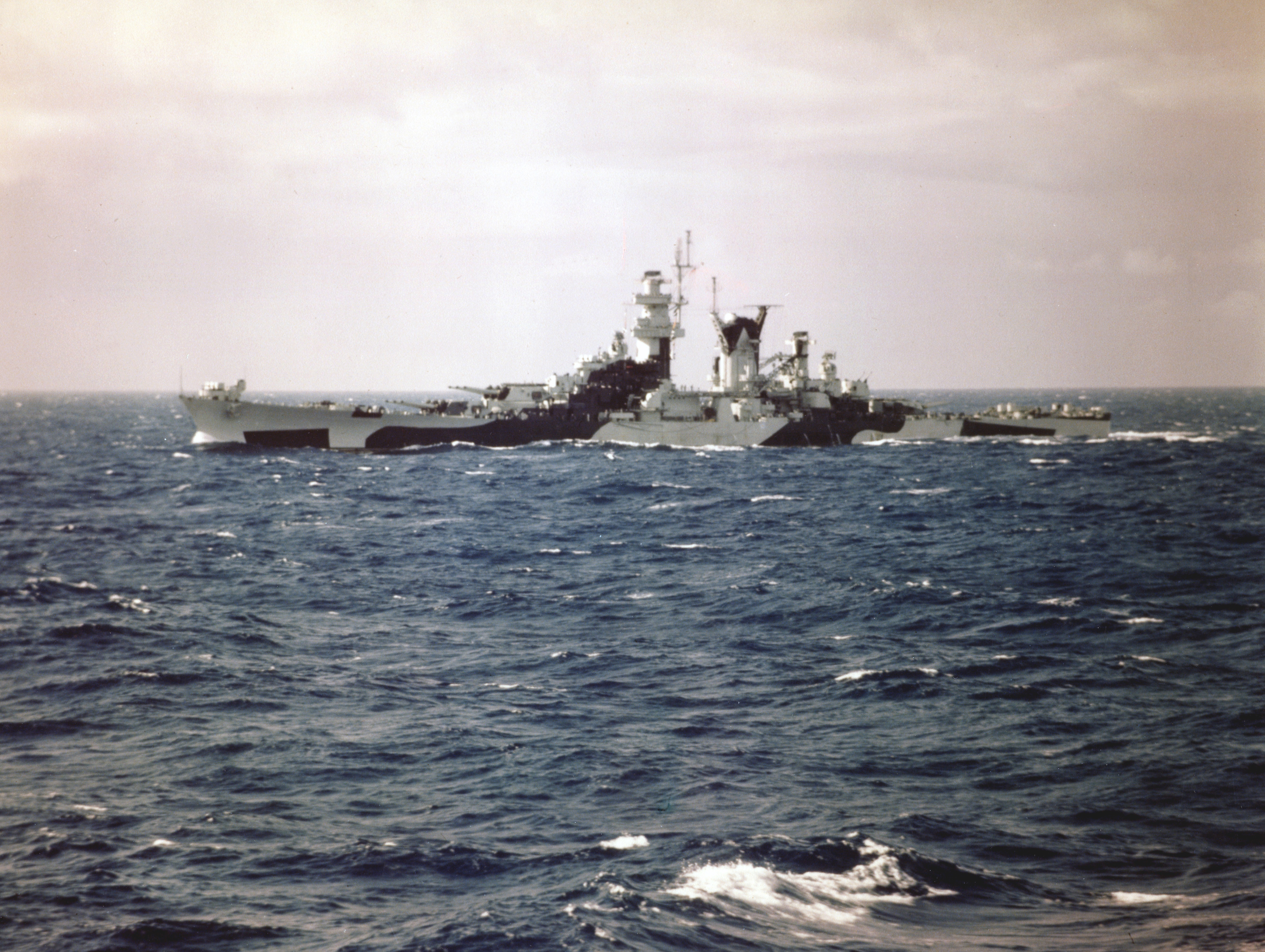
- Alaska during her shakedown cruise in August 1944

Class overview
- Name: Alaska class
- Builders: New York Ship, NJ (2)
- Operators: United States Navy
- Built: 17 December 1941 – 11 September 1944
- In commission: 17 June 1944 – 17 February 1947
- Planned: 6
- Completed: 2
- Canceled: 4
- Scrapped: 2

General characteristics
- Type: Large cruiser
- Displacement: 29,771 long tons (30,249 t) (standard); 34,253 long tons (34,803 t) (full load)
- Length: 808 ft 6 in (246.43 m) overall; 791 ft 6 in (241.25 m) waterline
- Beam: 91 ft 9.375 in (28.0 m)
- Draft: 27 ft 1 in (8.26 m) (mean) 31 ft 9.25 in (9.68 m) (maximum)
- Propulsion: 4-shaft General Electric steam turbines, double-reduction gearing, 8 Babcock & Wilcox boilers; 150,000 shp (110,000 kW)
- Speed: 33 knots (61 km/h; 38 mph)
- Range: 12,000 nautical miles (22,000 km; 14,000 mi) at 15 knots (28 km/h; 17 mph)
- Complement: 1,517–1,799–2,251 (Note: Sources vary greatly on just how many people composed the complement of the ships.)
- Armament: 9 × 12-inch (305 mm)/50 caliber Mark 8 guns (3 × 3); 12 × 5-inch (127 mm)/38 caliber dual-purpose guns (6 × 2); 56 × 40 mm (1.57 in) Bofors (14 × 4); 34 × 20mm Oerlikon (34 × 1)
- Armor: Main side belt: 9 in (230 mm) gradually thinning to 5 in (130 mm), sloped at 10 degrees; Armor deck: 3.8–4 in (97–102 mm); Weather (main) deck: 1.4 in (36 mm); Splinter (third) deck: 0.625 in (15.9 mm); Barbettes: 11–13 in (280–330 mm); Turrets: 12.8 in (330 mm) face, 5 in (130 mm) roof, 5.25–6 in (133–152 mm) side and 5.25 in (133 mm) rear.; Conning tower: 10.6 in (270 mm) with 5 in (130 mm) roof
- Aircraft carried: 4 × OS2U Kingfisher or SC Seahawk (Note: The Seahawk made its operational debut upon Guam on 22 October 1944.)
- Aviation facilities: Enclosed hangar located amidships

The Alaska-class were six large cruisers ordered before World War II for the United States Navy (USN), of which only two were completed and saw service late in the war. The USN designation for ships of the class was "large cruiser" (assigned the hull symbol of "CB"), a designation unique to the Alaska-class, and the majority of leading reference works refer to them as such. However, various other works have alternately described these ships as battlecruisers despite the USN having never classified them as such, and having actively discouraged the use of the term in describing the class. Ships of the class are also sometimes referred to as "super cruisers".

The Alaskas were all named after territories or insular areas of the United States, signifying their intermediate status between larger battleships (which were mostly named after states) and smaller heavy and light cruisers (which were named after cities). (Note: With only one exception (USS Kearsarge), USN battleships, such as USS Nevada or USS New Jersey, were named for states, while cruisers, like USS Wichita, were named for cities, in-line with United States ship naming conventions. Alaska and Hawaii were insular areas of the United States at the time; they became the forty-ninth and fiftieth States in 1959.)

The idea for a large cruiser class originated in the early 1930s when the USN sought to counter the Deutschland-class "pocket battleships" being launched by Germany. Planning for ships that eventually evolved into the Alaska-class began in the late 1930s after the deployment of Germany's Scharnhorst-class battleships and rumors that Japan was constructing a new large cruiser class, the B-65 "super cruiser." (Note: Jane's thought that this... battlecruiser, the notional Chichibu-class, would have six 12-inch guns and 30 knots (56 km/h; 35 mph) speed packed into a 15,000-ton ship. See Fitzsimons, Volume 1, 58 and Worth, 305.) To serve as "cruiser-killers" capable of seeking out and destroying these post-treaty heavy cruisers, the class was given large guns of a new and expensive design, limited armor protection against 12-inch shells, and machinery capable of speeds of about 31–33 knots (57–61 km/h; 36–38 mph).

Of the six planned, Alaska and Guam were the only two to be commissioned; a third, Hawaii, was close to completion at the war's end and had its construction suspended on 16 April 1947, while the remaining three were cancelled. Alaska and Guam served with the USN for the last year of World War II as bombardment ships and fast carrier escorts. They were decommissioned in 1947 after spending only 32 and 29 months in service, respectively.

== Background ==
Heavy cruiser development formalized between World War I and World War II due to the terms of the Washington Naval Treaty and successor treaties and conferences, where the United States, Britain, Japan, France, and Italy agreed to limit heavy cruisers to 10,000 tons displacement with 8-inch main armament. Up until the Alaska class, US cruisers designed between the wars followed this pattern.

The initial impetus for the Alaska design came from the deployments of Germany's so-called pocket battleships in the early 1930s. Though no actions were immediately taken, these thoughts were revived in the late 1930s when intelligence reports indicated Japan was planning or building "super cruisers" of the B-65 class that would be much more powerful than the current US heavy cruisers. (Note: Japan actually developed plans for two super cruisers in 1941, though it was mostly in response to the new Alaska ships. However, the ships were not ordered due to the greater need for carriers. See Design B-65 cruiser.) The navy responded in 1938 when the General Board asked the Bureau of Construction and Repair to conduct a "comprehensive study of all types of naval vessels for consideration for a new and expanded building program". The US president at the time, Franklin Delano Roosevelt, may have taken a lead role in the development of the class with his desire to have a counter to raiding abilities of Japanese cruisers and German pocket battleships. While these claims are difficult to verify, others have speculated that their design was "politically motivated" rather than strategic.

=== Design ===
One historian described the design process of the Alaska class as "torturous" due to the numerous changes and modifications made to the ship's layouts by numerous departments and individuals. Indeed, there were at least nine different layouts, ranging from 6,000-ton Atlanta-class anti-aircraft cruisers to "overgrown" heavy cruisers and a 38,000-ton mini-battleship that would have been armed with twelve 12-inch and sixteen 5-inch guns. The General Board, in an attempt to keep the displacement under 25,000 tons, allowed the designs to offer only limited underwater protection such that they were vulnerable, by comparison with a battleship, to torpedoes and to shells that fell short of the ship. The final design was a scaled-up Baltimore class that had the same machinery as the Essex-class aircraft carriers. This ship combined a main armament of nine 12-inch guns with protection against 10-inch gunfire into a hull that was capable of 33 knots (61 km/h; 38 mph).

The Alaskas were officially funded in September 1940 along with a plethora of other ships as a part of the Two-Ocean Navy Act. (Note: Over two hundred other ships were ordered at the same time: two Iowa-class battleships, five Montana-class battleships, twelve Essex-class aircraft carriers, four Baltimore-class heavy cruisers, 19 Cleveland-class light cruisers, four Atlanta-class light cruisers, 52 Fletcher-class destroyers, twelve Benson-class destroyers and 73 Gato-class submarines.) Their role had been altered slightly: in addition to their surface-to-surface role, they were planned to protect carrier groups. This carrier escort capability was favored by Admiral King. Because of their bigger guns, greater size and increased speed, they would be more valuable in this role than heavy cruisers, and would provide insurance against reports that Japan was building super cruisers more powerful than the American heavy cruisers. The escort concept would also free the few existing heavy cruisers for scouting (their original purpose).

=== Possible conversion to aircraft carriers ===
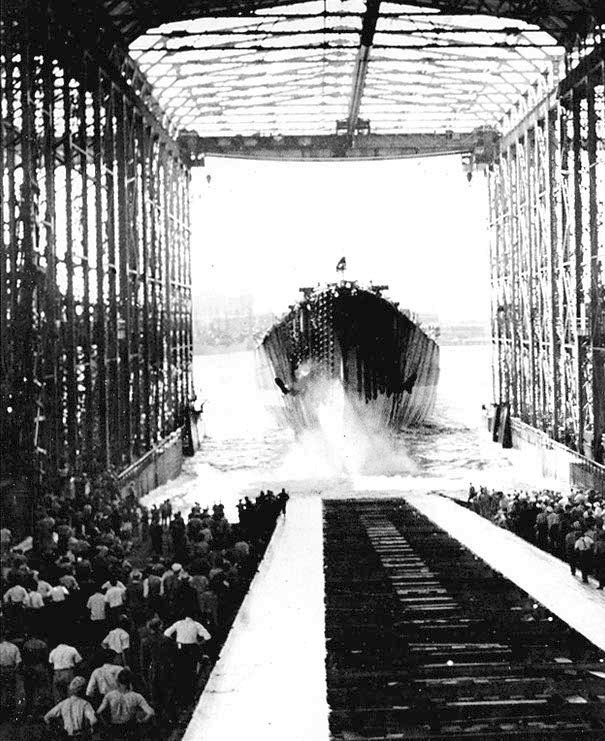
Alaska being launched on 15 August 1943

Yet another drastic change was considered during the "carrier panic" in late 1941, when the US Navy realized that they needed more aircraft carriers as quickly as possible. Many hulls currently under construction were considered for conversion into carriers. At different times, they considered some or all of the Cleveland-class light cruisers, the Baltimore-class heavy cruisers, the Alaska class, and even one of the Iowa-class battleships; in the end, they chose the Clevelands, resulting in the conversion of nine ships under construction at the New York Shipbuilding Corporation shipyard as the light aircraft carriers comprising the Independence-class.

A conversion of the Alaska cruisers to carriers was "particularly attractive" because of the many similarities between the design of the Essex-class aircraft carriers and the Alaska class, including the same machinery. However, when Alaska cruisers were compared to the Essex carriers, converted cruisers would have had a shorter flight deck (so they could carry only 90% of the aircraft), would have been 11 feet (3.4 m) lower in the water, and could travel 8,000 nautical miles (15,000 km) less at 15 knots (28 km/h; 17 mph). In addition, the large cruiser design did not include the extensive underwater protections found in normal carriers due to the armor weight devoted to counter shell fire. Lastly, an Alaska conversion could not satisfy the navy's goal of having new aircraft carriers quickly, as the work needed to modify the ships into carriers would entail long delays. With this in mind, all planning to convert the Alaskas was abandoned on 7 January 1942.

== Construction ==
Of the six Alaska-class cruisers that were planned, only three were laid down. The first two, Alaska and Guam, were completed by the New York Shipbuilding Corporation. Construction of Hawaii, the third, was suspended on 16 April 1947 when she was 84% complete. The last three, Philippines, Puerto Rico, and Samoa, were delayed since all available materials and slipways were allocated to higher priority ships, such as aircraft carriers, destroyers, and submarines. Construction had still not begun when steel shortages and a realization that these "cruiser-killers" had no more cruisers to hunt—as the fleets of Japanese cruisers had already been defeated by aircraft and submarines—made the ships "white elephants". As a result, construction of the last three members of the class never began, and they were officially cancelled on 24 June 1943.

== Service history ==
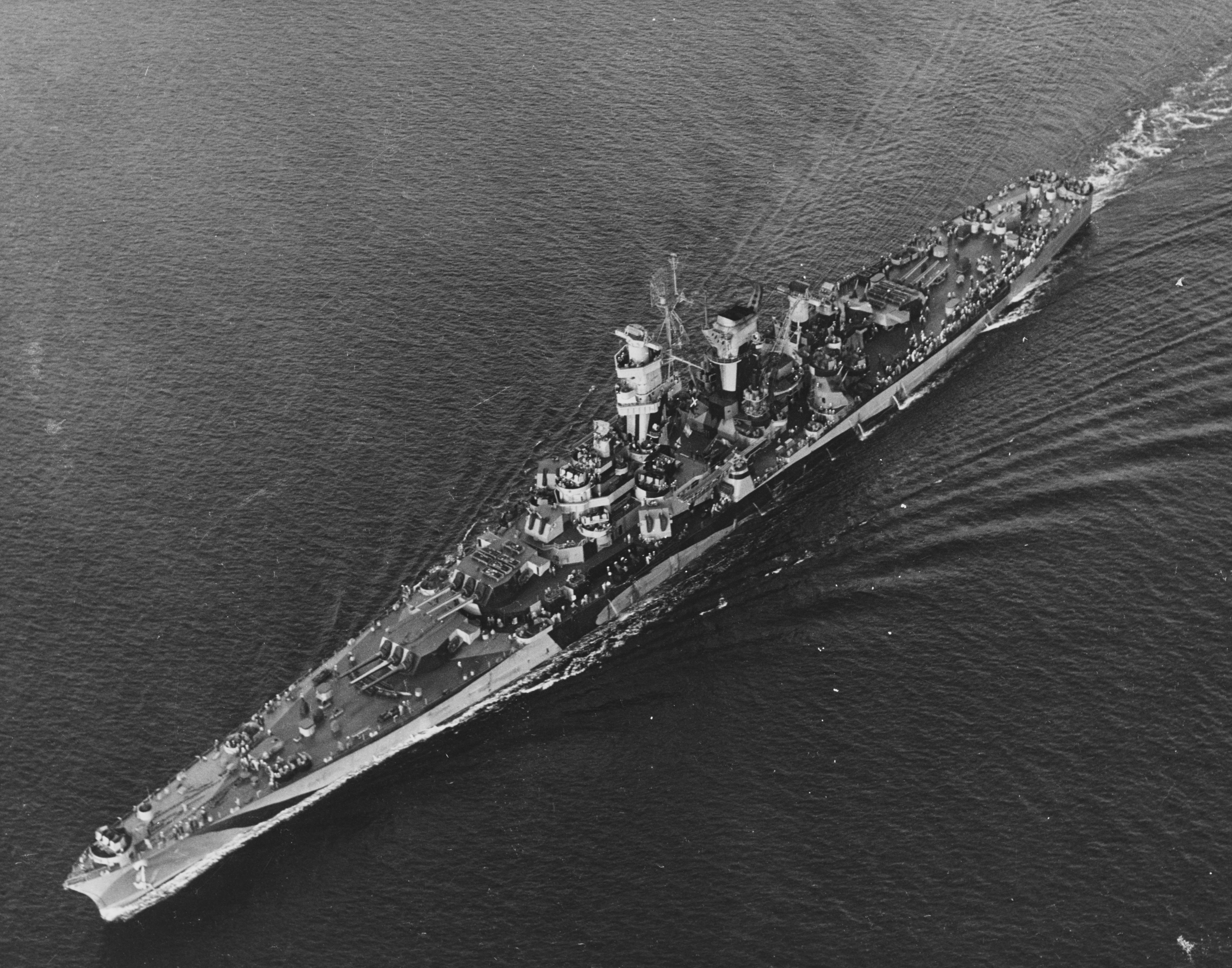
Guam during her shakedown cruise on 13 November 1944

Alaska and Guam served with the U.S. Navy during the last year of World War II, forming Cruiser Division 16 commanded by Rear Admiral Francis S. Low, USN. Similar to the Iowa-class fast battleships, their firepower was useful in shore bombardment, and their speed made them excellent fast carrier escorts, a role for which the two had become celebrated within the fleet by the war's end. Both Alaska and Guam protected Franklin when she was on her way to be repaired in Guam after being hit by two Japanese bombs. Afterward, Alaska supported the landings on Okinawa, while Guam went to San Pedro Bay to become the leader of a new task force, Cruiser Task Force 95, under the overall command of Vice Admiral Jesse B. Oldendorf. Guam, joined by Alaska, four light cruisers, and nine destroyers, led the task force into the East China and Yellow Seas to conduct raids upon shipping; however, they encountered only Chinese junks. Subsequently, both ships returned to the United States in mid-December 1945, and they were decommissioned and "mothballed" in 1947, after having spent 32 months (Alaska) and 29 months (Guam) in service.

After the war, both ships served as part of Task Force 71, the designation for the U.S. Seventh Fleet's North China Naval Force. Its mission was to support the American occupation of southern Korea. This included executing various show-the-flag operations along the western coast of Korea as well as in the Bohai Sea. These naval demonstrations preceded Operation Chromite, the amphibious landing of U.S. Army ground forces at Incheon, Korea, on 10 September 1950.

In 1958, the Bureau of Ships prepared two feasibility studies to explore whether Alaska and Guam could be suitably converted into guided-missile cruisers. The first study involved removing all of the guns in favor of four different missile systems. At $160 million, the cost of this proposed removal was seen as prohibitive, so a second study was initiated. The study left the forward batteries (the two 12-inch triple turrets and three of the 5-inch dual turrets) unchanged, and added a reduced version of the first plan on the stern of the ship. Even though the proposals would have cost approximately half as much as the first study's plan ($82 million), it was still seen as too expensive. As a result, both ships were stricken from the Naval Vessel Register on 1 June 1960. Alaska was sold for scrap on 30 June 1960, and Guam on 24 May 1961. The still-incomplete Hawaii was considered for a conversion to be the Navy's first guided-missile cruiser; (Note: A similar proposal was made to convert the uncompleted Iowa-class battleship USS Kentucky into the first guided-missile battleship, but as with the proposal for Hawaii this conversion never materialized, and Kentucky was scrapped in 1958.) this thought lasted until 26 February 1952, when a different conversion to a "large command ship" was contemplated. In anticipation of the conversion, her classification was changed to CBC-1. This would have made her a "larger sister" to Northampton, but a year and a half later (9 October 1954) she was re-designated CB-3. Hawaii was stricken from the Naval Vessel Register on 9 June 1958 and was sold for scrap in 1959.

== "Large cruisers" or "battlecruisers" ==
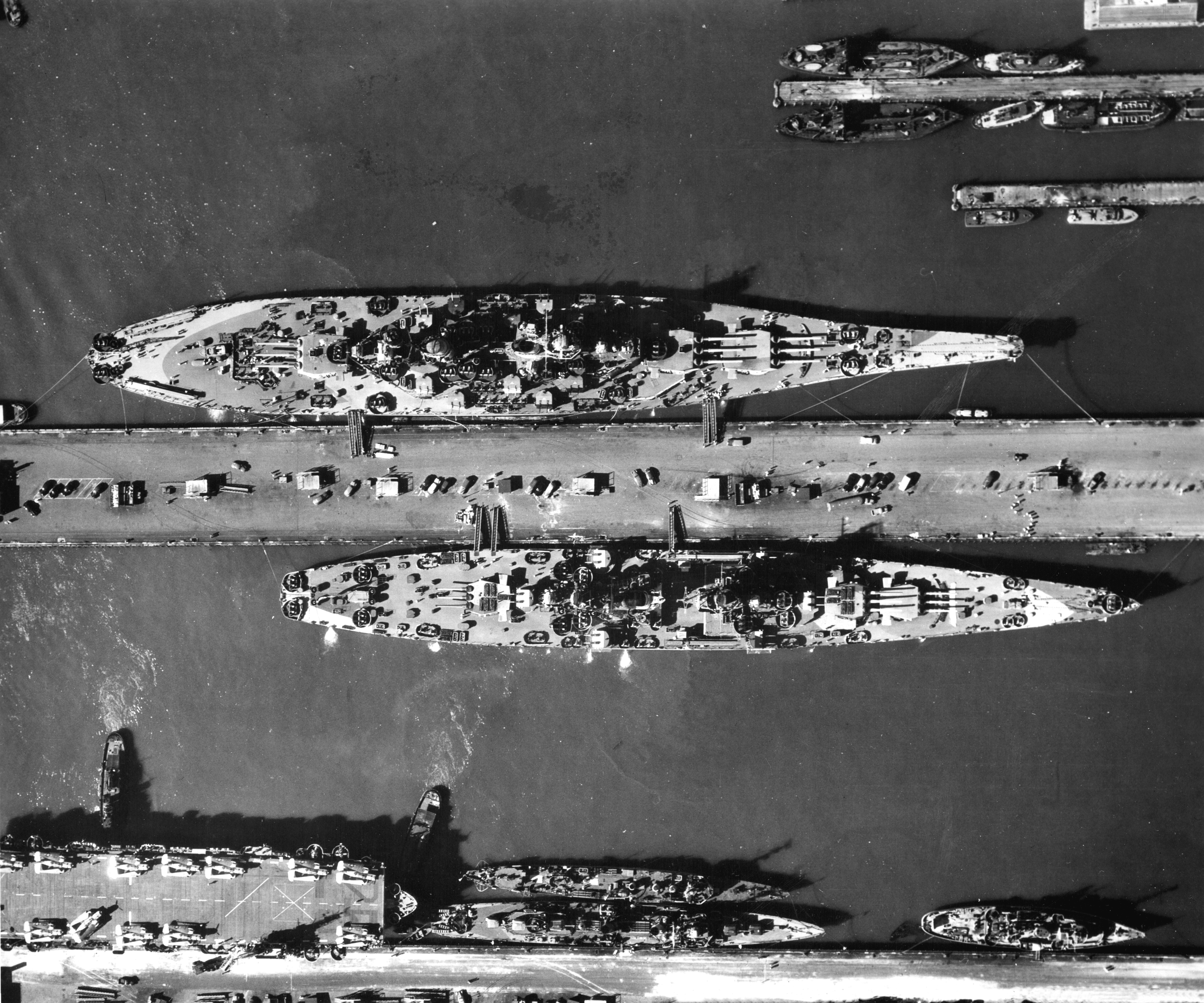
An Iowa-class battleship (Missouri), 887 ft (270 m) and 57,540 long tons (58,460 t), the largest U.S. Navy battleship class (top), and Alaska, 808 ft (246 m) and 29,771 long tons (30,249 t), moored at the same pier

The Alaska class, along with the Dutch Design 1047 battlecruiser and the Japanese Design B-65 cruiser, were specifically to counter the heavy cruisers being built by their naval rivals. All three have been described as "super cruisers", "large cruisers" or even "unrestricted cruisers", with some (up to Jane's Fighting Ships of World War II itself) advocating that they even be considered as battlecruisers. However, they were never officially classified as capital ships, as that designation was reserved for true battlecruisers and battleships. Early in its development, the class used the US battlecruiser designation CC, which had been planned for the Lexington class. However, the designation was changed to CB to reflect their new status, "large cruiser", and the practice of referring to them as battlecruisers was officially discouraged. The U.S. Navy then named the individual vessels after U.S. territories, rather than states (as was the tradition with battleships) or cities (for which cruisers were traditionally named), to symbolize the belief that these ships were supposed to play an intermediate role between cruisers and battleships.

The Alaska class certainly resembled contemporary US battleships (particularly the North Carolina class, South Dakota class, and Iowa class) in appearance, including the familiar 2-A-1 main battery and massive columnar mast. Their displacement was twice that of the newest heavy cruisers (the Baltimore class), being only 5,000 tons less than the Washington Treaty's battleship standard displacement limit of 35,000 long tons (36,000 t) (unchanged through the final naval treaty, the London Treaty of 1936). They were also longer than several treaty battleships such as the 745 ft 1 in (227.1 m) King George V class and 724 ft (221 m) North Carolina class.

In overall terms, the design of the Alaska class was scaled up from that of the Baltimore class (themselves the first cruisers in the US Navy to be designed without the limitations of the London Naval Treaty, and exceeding 10,000 tons standard displacement). The armor scheme of the Alaskas was deemed sufficient to provide protection against not only 8-inch heavy cruiser shells but even the larger 11-inch shells used by Germany's Deutschland-class "pocket battleships" and Scharnhorst-class battleships. However, they lacked the comprehensive underwater protection systems found on the larger US battleships or even on smaller, earlier battleships like the French Dunkerque and German Scharnhorst classes. Thus, the Alaskas were potentially as vulnerable to torpedoes as a heavy cruiser was, as well as to effects from near-misses and 'shorts' (where enemy gunnery misses the ship proper, instead impacting the sea; this could still damage the target ship, as the shell may have enough energy to impact beneath the waterline, or if a shell detonated underwater, the shockwave could damage the target ship).

In addition, despite being much larger than the Baltimore class, the secondary battery of the Alaskas was identical, albeit with an improvement in light anti-aircraft battery size. Whereas the Alaska class carried twelve 5-inch/38 caliber in six twin turrets, fifty-six 40 mm, and thirty-four 20 mm guns, the Baltimore class carried the same number of 5-inch/38s, eight fewer 40 mm, and ten fewer 20 mm, considerably fewer than new U.S. battleships that had ten (save for South Dakota) 5-inch/38 twin mounts while older refitted U.S. battleships had eight. The lack of anti-aircraft weaponry for a ship of its size was attributed to the amidships aircraft catapult like older US cruisers; while other modern U.S. cruisers and battleships opted for stern-mounted aircraft catapults to free up space along the central superstructure for more secondaries and anti-aircraft guns. In common with U.S. heavy cruisers, they had aircraft hangars and a single large rudder; the single rudder combined with the hull's long length gave the Alaskas a turning radius of 800 yd (730 m), which exceeded the turning circles of larger battleships and carriers in the U.S. Navy. Author Richard Worth remarked that when they were finally completed, launched, and commissioned, they had the "size of a battleship but the capabilities of a cruiser". The Alaska class was similarly expensive to build and maintain as contemporary battleships, yet far less capable due to armor deficiencies, while able to put up an anti-aircraft defense comparable only to the much cheaper Baltimore cruisers.

Despite these cruiser-like characteristics, and the U.S. Navy's insistence on their status as cruisers, the Alaska class has been frequently described as battlecruisers. The official navy magazine All Hands said "The Guam and her sister ship Alaska are the first American battle cruisers ever to be completed as such."

Armament-wise, the Alaskas had much larger guns than contemporary heavy cruisers; while the Baltimore class only carried nine 8-inch/55 caliber Marks 12 and 15 guns, the Alaska class carried nine 12-inch/50 caliber guns that were as good as, if not superior to, the old 14-inch/50 caliber gun used on the U.S. Navy's pre-treaty battleships. The Alaskas' percentage of armor tonnage, 28.4%, was slightly less than that of fast battleships; the British King George V class, the American Iowa class, and the battlecruiser/fast battleship HMS Hood all had armor percentages between 32 and 33%, whereas the Lexington-class battlecruiser design had a nearly identical armor percentage of 28.5%. In fact, older battlecruisers, such as Invincible (19.9%), had a significantly lower percentage.

Contributions to the debate over the classification and type of the Alaska class can be misleading or poorly considered and/or informed. For example, author Chris Knupp noted that while "other nations fulfilled the battlecruiser role by designing vessels like battleships, but stripped of armor and other features to gain speed", the United States "fulfilled the battlecruiser role by creating a larger, more powerful heavy cruiser...[whose] design already offered less armor and higher speed, but by enlarging the ship they gained the heavier firepower".

== Armament ==
=== Main battery ===
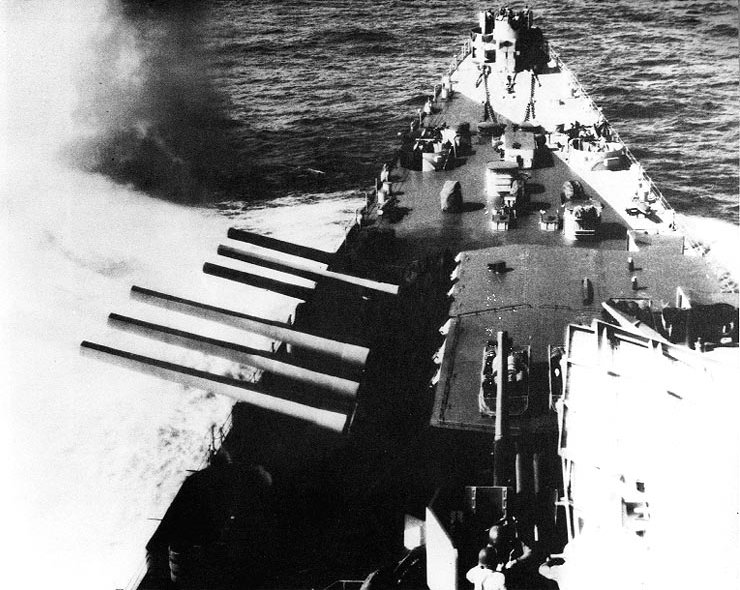
Guam firing her main battery during a training session sometime in 1944–1945

As built, the Alaska class had nine 12-inch/50 caliber Mark 8 guns mounted in three triple (3-gun) turrets, with two turrets forward and one aft, a configuration known as "2-A-1". The previous 12-inch gun manufactured for the U.S. Navy was the Mark 7 version, which had been designed for and installed in the 1912 Wyoming-class battleships. The Mark 8 was of considerably higher quality; in fact, it "was by far the most powerful weapon of its caliber ever placed in service". Designed in 1939, it weighed 121,856 pounds (55,273 kg) including the breech, and could sustain an average rate of fire of 2.4–3 rounds a minute. It could throw a 1,140-pound (520 kg) Mark 18 armor-piercing shell 38,573 yards (35,271 m) at an elevation of 45°, and had a 344-shot barrel life (about 54 more than the much larger but similar 16-inch/50 caliber Mark 7 gun found on the Iowa battleships.). The Alaskas' Mark 8 guns were the heaviest main battery of any cruiser of World War II, and as capable as the old 14-inch/50 caliber gun used on the U.S. Navy's pre-treaty battleships.

The turrets were very similar to those of the Iowa-class battleships, but differed in several ways; for example, the Alaska class had a two-stage powder hoist instead of the Iowa class's one-stage hoist. These differences made operating the guns safer and increased the rate of fire. In addition, a "projectile rammer" was added to Alaska and Guam. This machine transferred shells from storage on the ship to the rotating ring that fed the guns. However, this feature proved unsatisfactory, and it was not planned for Hawaii or any subsequent ships.

Because Alaska and Guam were the only two ships to mount these guns, only ten turrets were made during the war (three for each ship including Hawaii and one spare). They cost $1,550,000 each and were the most expensive heavy guns purchased by the U.S. Navy in World War II.

=== Secondary battery ===
The secondary battery of the Alaska class was composed of twelve dual-purpose (anti-air and anti-ship) 5-inch/38 caliber guns in twin mounts, with four offset on each side of the superstructure (two on each beam) and two centerline turrets fore and aft. The 5-inch/38 was originally intended for use on only destroyers built in the 1930s, but by 1934 and into World War II it was being installed on almost all of the U.S.'s major warships, including aircraft carriers, battleships, and heavy and light cruisers.

=== Anti-aircraft battery ===
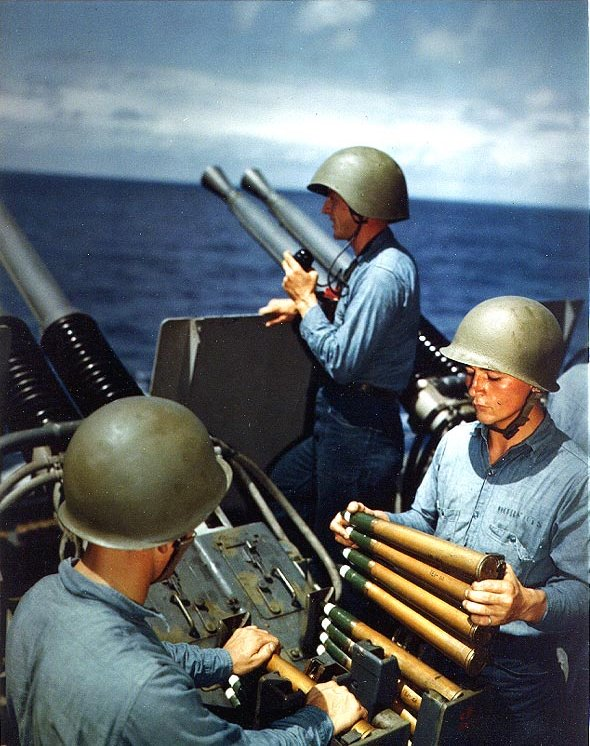
Crew of a 40 mm Bofors gun on Alaska mount ammunition clips into the loaders of a pair of guns on 6 March 1945 during the Battle of Iwo Jima

Medium anti-aircraft armament (a key component of area air defence within a Task Group) on the Alaska-class ships was 56 x 40mm Bofors guns and for close-in air defence they carried 34 × 20 mm guns. These numbers may be compared with; 48 × 40 mm and 24 × 20 mm on the smaller Baltimore-class heavy cruisers, 60 x 40 mm and 36 x 20 mm on the larger battleship North Carolina at the end of the war, and 80 × 40 mm and 49 × 20 mm on the even larger Iowa-class battleships.

== Ships in class ==
List of Alaska-class cruisers
| Name | Namesake | Pennant | Builder | Ordered | Laid down | Launched | Commissioned | Decommissioned | Fate |
|---|---|---|---|---|---|---|---|---|---|
| Alaska | Territory of Alaska | CB-1 | New York Shipbuilding Corporation, Camden | 9 September 1940 | 17 December 1941 | 15 August 1943 | 17 June 1944 | 17 February 1947 | Broken up at Newark, 1961 |
| Guam | Territory of Guam | CB-2 | New York Shipbuilding Corporation, Camden | 9 September 1940 | 2 February 1942 | 12 November 1943 | 17 September 1944 | 17 February 1947 | Broken up at Baltimore, 1961 |
| Hawaii | Territory of Hawaii | CB-3; CBC-1 | New York Shipbuilding Corporation, Camden | 9 September 1940 | 20 December 1943 | 3 November 1945 | —N/a | | Broken up when 84% complete at Baltimore, 1960 |
| Philippines | Commonwealth of the Philippines | CB-4 | —N/a | 9 September 1940 | —N/a | | | | Cancelled June 1943 |
| Puerto Rico | Territory of Puerto Rico | CB-5 | —N/a | 9 September 1940 | —N/a | | | | Cancelled June 1943 |
| Samoa | Territory of American Samoa | CB-6 | —N/a | 9 September 1940 | —N/a | | | | Cancelled June 1943 |

- USS Alaska (CB-1) was commissioned on 17 June 1944. She served in the Pacific, screening aircraft carriers, providing shore bombardment at Okinawa, and going on raiding missions in the East China Sea. She was decommissioned on 17 February 1947 after less than three years of service and was scrapped in 1960.
- USS Guam (CB-2) was commissioned on 17 September 1944. She served in the Pacific with Alaska on almost all of the same operations. Along with Alaska, she was decommissioned on 17 February 1947 and was scrapped in 1961.
- USS Hawaii (CB-3) was intended as a third ship of the class, but she was never completed. Numerous plans to utilize her as a guided-missile cruiser or a large command ship in the years after the war were fruitless, and she was scrapped.
- USS Philippines (CB-4), Puerto Rico (CB-5), and Samoa (CB-6) were planned as the fourth, fifth, and sixth ships of the class, respectively. All three ships were to be built at Camden, New Jersey, but they were cancelled before construction could begin.

== See also ==
- Battlecruiser § Large cruisers or "cruiser killers"
- Design B-65 cruiser
- List of battlecruisers of the United States § Alaska class
- List of cruisers of the United States Navy § Large cruisers (CB)
- List of ship classes of the Second World War
- Stalingrad-class battlecruiser
