= Task Force 95 =

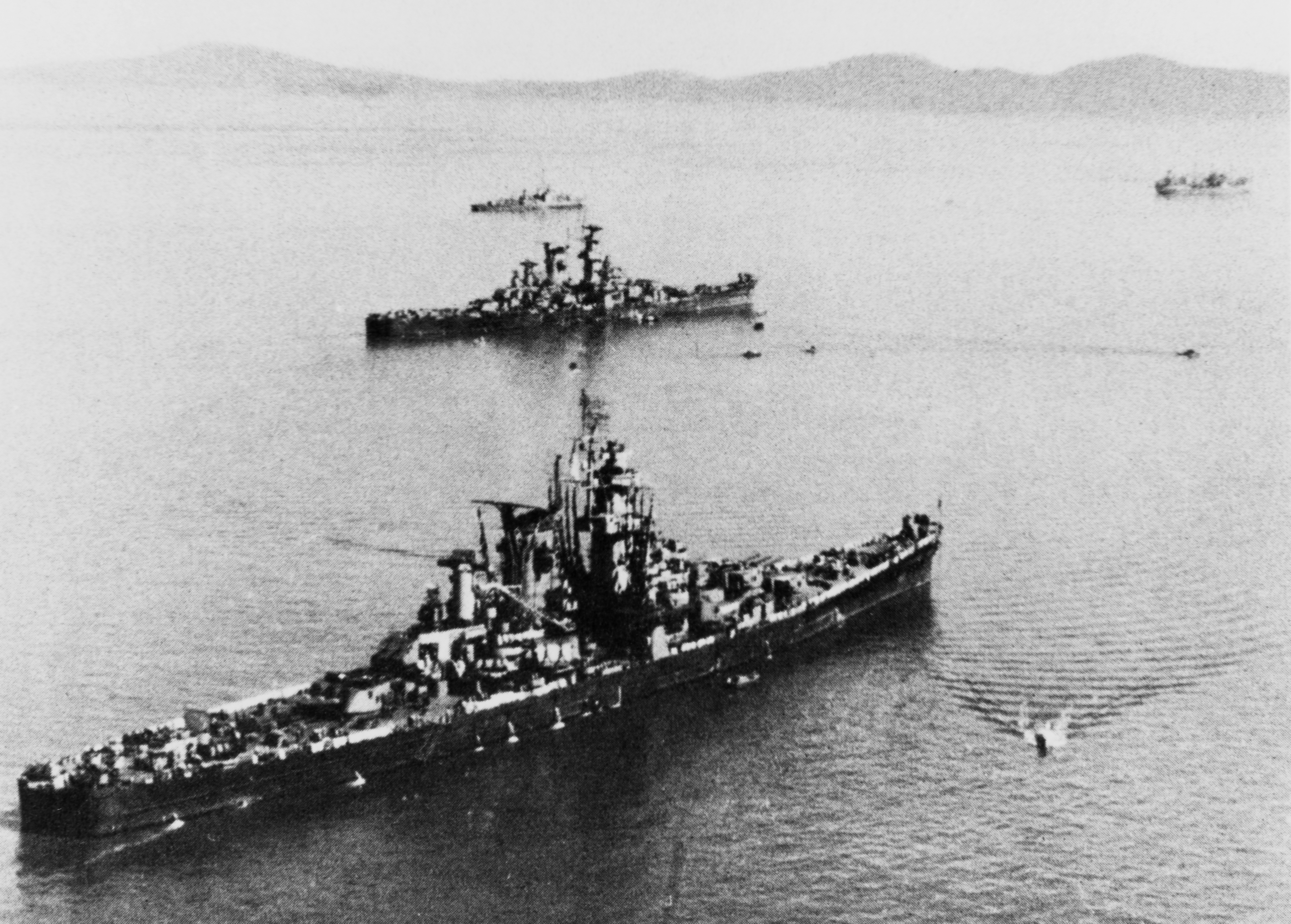
- The large cruisers USS Alaska and Guam in August 1945
- Active: July–November 1945; Korean War
- Country: United States
- Branch: United States Navy
- Base: Buckner Bay, Okinawa
- Engagements: World War II

Commanders
- Notable commanders: Jesse B. Oldendorf

Task Force 95 was a United States Navy force of World War II. It was established at Okinawa in July 1945 and conducted three operations into the East China Sea before the end of the war in mid-August that year. Task Force 95 was active as late as November 1945.

The designation was reactivated for use during the Korean War, when it was used for the United Nations Command Blockading and Escort Force, often helmed by the British Flag Officer Second in Command Far East Fleet. Vice Admiral William Andrewes served as Commander, Task Force 95 (CTF 95), for a period.

== World War II operational history ==
=== Surface sweeps ===
Task Force 95 (TF-95) was established in early July 1945 at Buckner Bay in Okinawa under the command of Vice Admiral Jesse B. Oldendorf. The formation was responsible for protecting American forces at Okinawa, including by providing radar pickets to detect incoming air raids, and sweeping the East China Sea of Japanese shipping. Upon formation, TF-95 comprised the large cruisers USS Alaska and Guam, four light cruisers and several destroyers.

TF-95 undertook its first anti-shipping sweep into the East China Sea between 17 and 24 July. At this time it comprised Alaska and Guam, light cruisers Cleveland, Columbia, Denver and Montpelier and nine destroyers. No Japanese ships were encountered. Official historian Samuel Eliot Morison noted that "direct results were few but the fact that a surface sweep of Japan's home waters could be made with impunity demonstrated how low the enemy's air and naval power had sunk".

Three destroyers assigned to TF-95 were struck by Japanese kamikaze aircraft in July. USS Thatcher was hit while in Buckner Bay on 19 July. This resulted in two members of her crew being wounded and damage which was judged to be beyond repair. Callaghan was sunk on 28 July while operating as a radar picket off Okinawa; 47 members of her crew were killed. Cassin Young was also damaged by a kamikaze on 29 July during a radar picket patrol near Okinawa, with 22 of her crew being killed and 45 wounded.

TF-95 also included Task Group 95.7 in the Philippines, which was responsible for delivering training. The heavy cruiser USS Indianapolis was en-route to join this Task Group for training ahead of joining the main body of TF-95 when she was torpedoed and sunk on 30 July.

The Task Force's second operation began on 1 August. This operation involved the ships used in the first attack, which were designated Task Group 95.2, as well as a covering force designated Task Group 95.3. The covering force comprised battleships California, Nevada and Tennessee, escort carriers Cape Gloucester, Lunga Point and Makin Island, heavy cruiser Wichita, light cruiser St. Louis, six destroyers and three destroyer escorts. During this operation Task Group 95.2 patrolled along the Chinese coast north of the Yangtze Delta each night. As with the first operation, no Japanese ships were located. The escort carriers conducted two anti-shipping strikes which resulted in the sinking of a coastal barge as well as damage to a small cargo ship and shore installations. One of these attacks was made on 6 August, during which aircraft from all three escort carriers struck shipping in Tinghai. Fighters flying from the carriers also shot down four Japanese aircraft. One American fighter, a Grumman F4F Wildcat, was shot down by anti-aircraft guns. Two other Wildcats and three Vought F4U Corsairs were damaged. TF-95 broke off the operation on 6 August, and reached Buckner Bay the next day.

In his report on the 1–7 August operation, Oldendorf noted that Japanese shipping in the East China Sea had been "practically eliminated" by air and submarine attacks. He judged that "appropriate targets for Naval guns no longer existed in the area near the Yangtze mouth." Historian Brian Lane Herder has observed that despite its lack of results, "TF-95 tightened the pressure on Japan, and its mere existence demonstrates the extravagance of naval power the Allies were bringing to bear [in] the final weeks of the war".

=== Minesweeping and post-war ===
A large minesweeping force, designated Task Group 95.4 also operated in the East China Sea during the final days of the war. Task Group 95.4 departed Buckner Bay on 11 August. At this time it comprised four light minelayers, 40 minesweepers, 10 motor minesweepers and several support ships. The Task Group returned to Buckner Bay on 25 August; during this operation it destroyed 578 mines.

The battleship Pennsylvania arrived at Okinawa on 12 August, and became Oldendorf's flagship. That night a Japanese aircraft penetrated Buckner Bay and torpedoed Pennsylvania. A total of 20 American sailors were killed, and Oldendorf and many others were wounded.

Oldendorf continued as the commander of TF-95 until November 1945.

== World War II organization ==
Historian Jürgen Rohwer provides the following structure for Task Force 95, but does not specify when it applied:

- Task Group 95.1
  - Battleships USS Tennessee and USS Pennsylvania
- Task Group 95.2
  - Large cruisers USS Alaska and USS Guam
  - Light cruisers USS Cleveland, USS Columbia, USS Denver and USS Montpelier
- Task Group 95.3
  - Task Unit 1
    - Escort carriers USS Lunga Point, USS Makin Island and USS Cape Gloucester
  - Task Unit 2
    - Battleships USS California and USS Nevada
    - Cruisers USS Salt Lake City, USS Chester, USS Wichita, USS St. Louis
    - 18 destroyers
- Task Group 95.7
  - Battleships USS Arkansas and USS Texas
  - Cruisers USS Portland, USS Mobile, USS Vicksburg
- In addition, the Task Force comprised a number of destroyers from Destroyer Squadrons 23, 45, 49 and 55 which were assigned to the task groups and used as radar pickets.

== Korean War ==
During the Korean War, a major fleet exercise occupied USS Philip (DD-498) during the first months of 1954, and she then began preparations for a journey to the Western Pacific. On 14 June, she stood out for Yokosuka, Japan, where she arrived 23 June, mooring alongside Hamul for two days of tender availability. Philip then got underway for the Shimonoseki Straits and Chinhae, Korea. After reporting for duty with Task Force 95, Philip steamed to Inchon to join HMS Warrior and act as plane guard for the British carrier on the United Nations Blockade. Philip escorted Warrior to Kure, Japan, 4 July, and sailed on to Sasebo for a week's restricted availability.
