= George McMillin =

38th and final Naval Governor of Guam

Rear admiral George Johnson McMillin
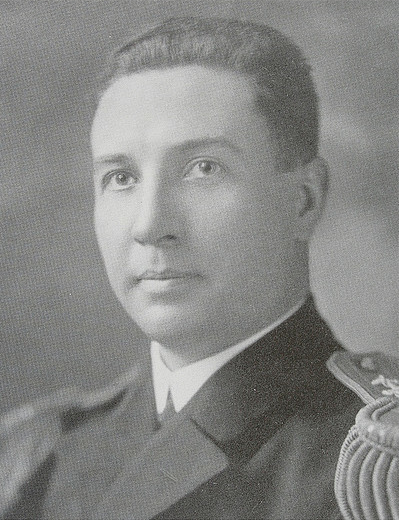

38th Naval Governor of Guam
- In office April 20, 1940 – December 10, 1941
- Preceded by: James Thomas Alexander
- Succeeded by: None (island captured by Japan)

Personal details
- Born: November 25, 1889 Youngstown, Ohio
- Died: August 29, 1983 (aged 93) Los Angeles County, California
- Spouse: Annabel Parlett McMillin
- Education: United States Naval Academy
- Awards: Legion of Merit; Prisoner of War Medal

Military service
- Allegiance: United States
- Branch/service: United States Navy
- Rank: Rear admiral
- Commands: USS Medusa
- Battles/wars: World War I Occupation of the Dominican Republic; Occupation of Veracruz; World War II: First Battle of Guam (surrendered)

George Johnson McMillin (November 25, 1889 – August 29, 1983) was a United States Navy rear admiral who served as the 38th and final naval governor of Guam. He served as an officer during four separate conflicts: World War I, the occupation of the Dominican Republic, the United States occupation of Veracruz, and World War II. He served on the staff of both the Naval Academy and the Naval War College as well. He is most remembered as the commander who surrendered Guamanian forces to a much larger Japanese force during the First Battle of Guam, only the second battle of World War II involving the United States. He had previously evacuated all but one civilian American citizen from the island and attempted to rebuild defenses after a strong typhoon devastated the island the year before. On December 8, 1941, Japanese forces invaded Guam and McMillin surrendered two days later. He spent the rest of the war at various Japanese prisoner of war camps.

== Early life ==
McMillin was born in Ohio on November 25, 1889, to Chas and Addie McMillin. He lived in Youngstown, Ohio, and had two brothers. He was left-handed.

In 1911, McMillin graduated from the United States Naval Academy.

== Career ==
=== Naval service ===
He was appointed to the United States Naval Academy in 1907, graduating in 1911. He transferred to the USS Delaware as an ensign the year of his graduation. From March 1919 to October of the same year, he served aboard the USS New Mexico as an assistant engineer officer. Following this assignment, he headed the Electrical School at the Mare Island Naval Shipyard. From August 1924 to September 1926 he served within the Office of the Chief of Naval Operations. Afterward, he became first lieutenant of the USS Saratoga for three years.

In the May 1930 to May 1933, he served as assistant to the Commandant of Midshipmen at the Naval Academy while a commander. In 1933, he was attached to the United States Asiatic Fleet. He attended the Naval War College in 1936 and served on staff there for two years following his graduation. From May 1938 to April 1939, he was executive officer aboard the USS Idaho, and then took command of the USS Medusa.

=== Governorship ===
McMillin served as the naval governor of Guam from April 20, 1940, to December 10, 1941. On November 3, 1940, the worst typhoon since 1918 hit Guam. The storm destroyed a majority of the island's crops, caused extensive damage to many military structures, and destroyed thousands of residential homes. McMillin requested $50,000 in aid from the American Red Cross.

He oversaw a major evacuation of all United States non-military citizens on the island during his term as the political situation with Japan grew more tense. In the summer of 1941, the evacuation began and was completed on October 17, 1941, with only one, the pregnant wife of the chief commissary steward, remaining.

==== Battle of Guam ====
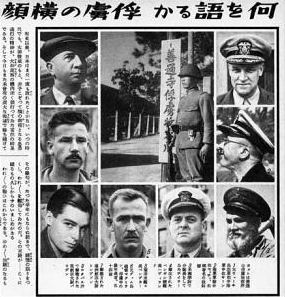
A Japanese propaganda poster produced depicting a number of prominent prisoners of war held by the government. McMillin can be seen in the top left of the poster.

The Department of the Navy informed McMillin of the December 7 attack on Pearl Harbor on December 8. Upon receiving this news and the beginning of United States involvement in World War II, McMillin ordered the evacuation of various civilian populations, the jailing of all Japanese nationals on the island, and churches, banks, and schools closed. A few hours later, the Japanese attacked Guam.

At 8:27 p.m. on December 8, the battle began. Japanese planes first began bombing the Marine barracks and then other key targets. The USS Penguin also sank in the initial attack. The USS Robert L. Barnes was set ablaze and captured by Japanese forces. On December 10, over 5000 Japanese troops landed on the island in numerous locations, compared to American troops numbering less than 1000. A group of Marines, sailors, and members of the Guam Insular Force Guard defended the Plaza de España but met a much larger Japanese force. McMillin soon ordered all documents of military value be destroyed as a Japanese victory became more apparent.

By 5:45 a.m., it became apparent that further resistance by American Marines would do no good, and McMillin ordered the sounding of a car horn three times, which both sides recognized as a sign to cease fire. McMillin surrendered the island at 6 a.m. on December 10 when Japanese troops captured him in the reception room of his living quarters, though some small fighting continued until 7:00 a.m. Twenty-one American military personnel and civilians died during the attack. He was one of the first American prisoners of war held by the Japanese and was held until August 20, 1945, when Red Army forces freed him.

=== Prisoner of war ===
After his capture on Guam, McMillin spent the rest of World War II as a prisoner of war at various Japanese POW camps. He was initially brought to a prison camp on Taiwan. On a few occasions there he was allowed to write to his wife, Annabel, who later sponsored and christened the cruiser USS Guam in 1944. Soon after his internment began, Dōmei Tsushin interviewed McMillin in a camp located on Shikoku. They reported that he supposedly seemed "chipper" and expressed his wish that President Franklin Roosevelt know that Guam had been "valiantly" defended. Eventually the Japanese transferred him to the Zentsūji camp, where he was the oldest prisoner at fifty-four.

In June 1949, McMillin retired from the Navy as a rear admiral. He served during four conflicts: World War I, the occupation of the Dominican Republic, the United States occupation of Veracruz, and World War II. He was postmaster of Long Beach, Calif., for eight years after his retirement.

== Personal life ==
On October 23, 1912, McMillin married Annabel Parlett in Annapolis, Maryland, at the home of the bride's parents. They have one daughter, Ann. McMillin and his family lived in places including Long Beach, California, and Guam.

McMillin's daughter attended Mrs. Porter’s School for Girls in Long Beach, California, the American School in Guam, and the Long Beach Junior College for one semester. In 1942, she won a partial scholarship to Ogontz Junior College in Pennsylvania.

Military offices
Preceded by James Thomas Alexander	Naval Governor of Guam; 1940–41	Succeeded by Abolished; Title next held by Roy Geiger
