= Curtiss SC Seahawk =

American scout seaplane

SC Seahawk
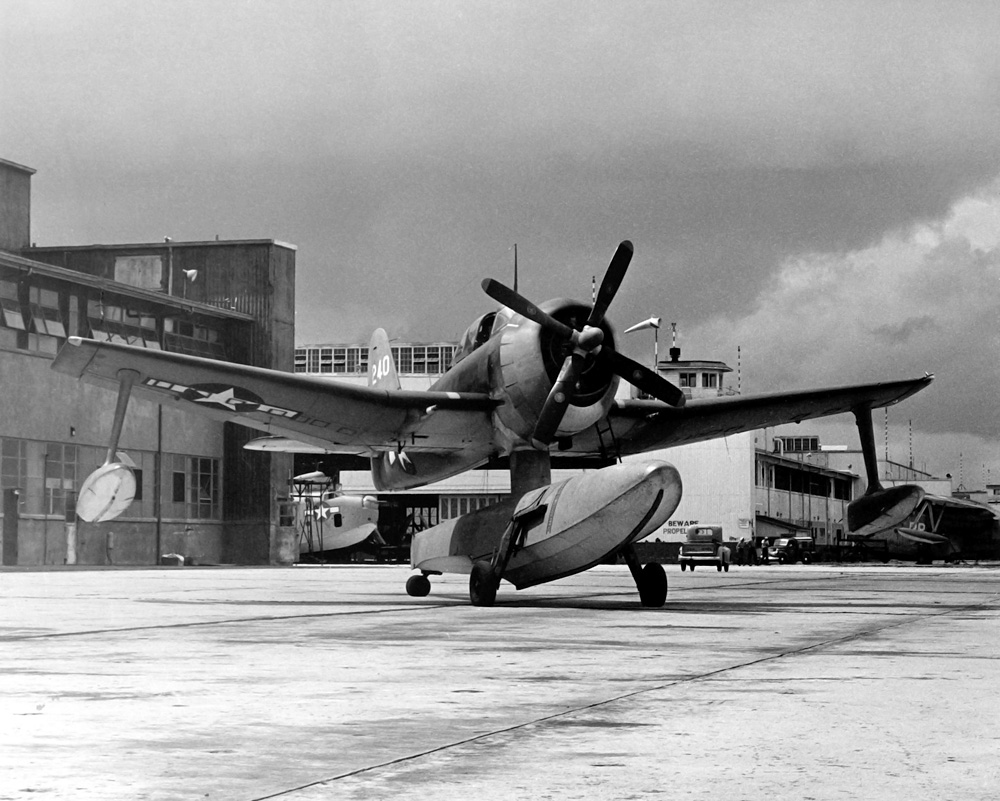
- A U.S. Navy SC-1 at Naval Air Station Jacksonville, Florida, in 1946

General information
- Type: Scout seaplane
- Manufacturer: Curtiss Aeroplane and Motor Company
- Primary user: United States Navy
- Number built: 577

History
- Introduction date: 1944
- First flight: 16 February 1944
- Retired: 1949

The Curtiss SC Seahawk was a scout seaplane designed by the Curtiss Aeroplane and Motor Company for the United States Navy during World War II. The existing Curtiss SO3C Seamew and Vought OS2U Kingfisher were gradually replaced by the Seahawk in the late stages of the war and into peacetime.

== Design and development ==
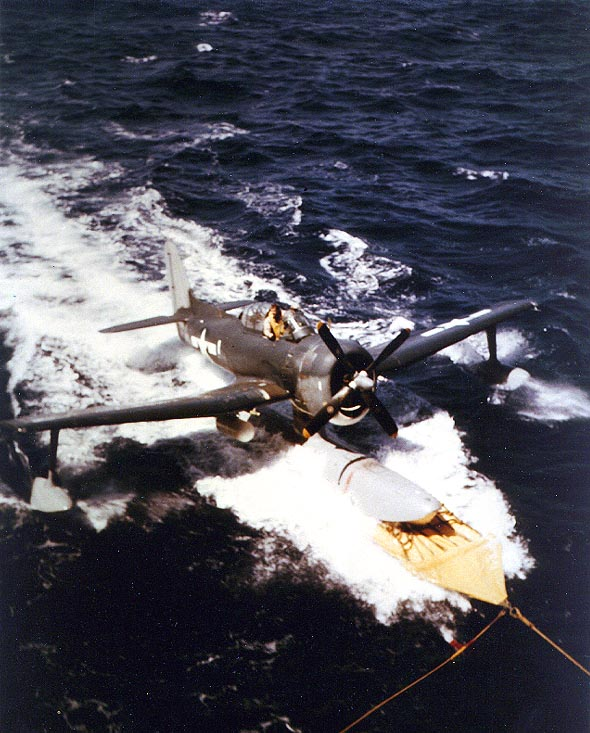
USS Alaska recovering a SC-1 in March 1945, during the Iwo Jima operation. The aircraft is awaiting pickup by the ship's crane after taxiing onto a landing mat.

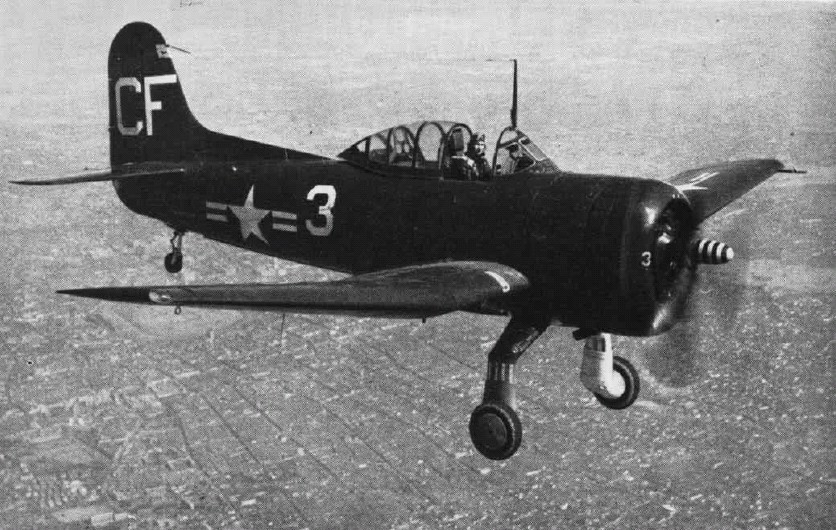
A U.S. Navy SC-1 from USS Duluth over Shanghai, China in 1948

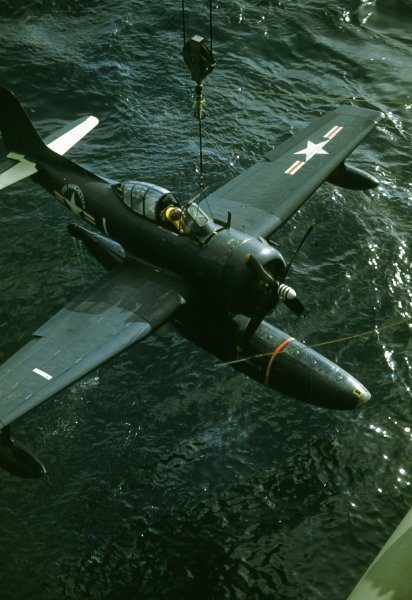
An SC-1 Seahawk being hoisted aboard USS Manchester during a deployment to the Mediterranean Sea from in 1947/1948

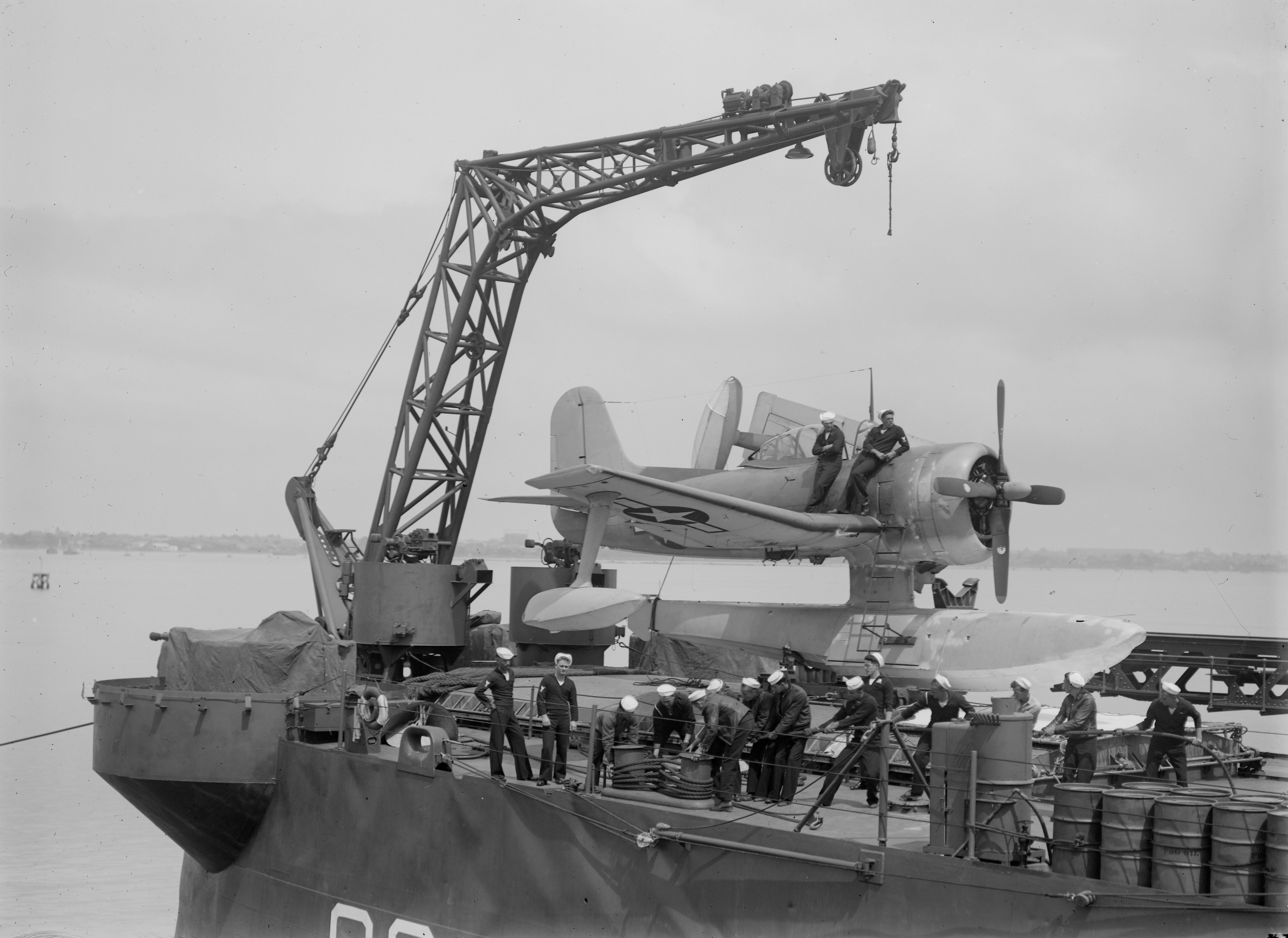
Seahawk on board USS Birmingham

Work began in June 1942, following a US Navy Bureau of Aeronautics request for observation seaplane proposals. Curtiss submitted the Seahawk design on 1 August 1942, with a contract for two prototypes and five service test aircraft awarded on 25 August. A production order for 500 SC-1s followed in June 1943, prior to the first flight of the prototypes.

While only intended to seat the pilot, a bunk was provided in the aft fuselage for rescue or personnel transfer. Two 0.5 in (12.7 mm) M2 Browning machine guns were fitted in the wings, and two underwing hardpoints allowed carriage of 250 lb (113 kg) bombs or, on the right wing, surface-scan radar. The wings were foldable. The main float, designed to incorporate a bomb bay, suffered substantial leaks when used in that fashion, and was modified to carry an auxiliary fuel tank.

The first flight of a prototype XSC-1 took place 16 February 1944 at the Columbus, Ohio Curtiss plant. Flight testing continued through 28 April, when the last of the seven pre-production aircraft took to the air. Nine further prototypes were later built, with a second seat and modified cockpit, under the designation SC-2; series production was not undertaken.

== Operational history ==
The first serial production Seahawks were delivered on 22 October 1944, to USS Guam. All 577 aircraft eventually produced for the Navy were delivered on conventional landing gear and flown to the appropriate Naval Air Station, where floats were fitted for service as needed.

Capable of being fitted with either float or wheeled landing gear, the Seahawk was arguably America's best floatplane scout of World War II. However, its protracted development time meant it entered service too late to see significant action in the war. It was not until June 1945, during the pre-invasion bombardment of Borneo, that the Seahawk was involved in military action. By the end of the war, seaplanes were becoming less desirable, with the Seahawk being replaced soon afterward by helicopters.

Tri-color camouflage and markings on the Seahawk were in accordance with US Navy regulations from 1944, 1945, and later postwar regulations.

== Variants ==
XSC-1
Prototype
SC-1
Equipped with single-stage, single-speed R-1820-62 engine, 1300 hp at 2600 rpm at 1,100 feet :Top speed in level flight 235 miles per hour (378 km/h) at 2,200 feet (670 m) with two wing bomb racks equipped and droppable AN/APS-4 radar on right wing rack
SC-2
Upgraded engine for improved altitude performance: Equipped with single-stage, two-speed R-1820-76 engine, 1425 hp at 2700 rpm at 1,000 feet, 1,100 hp at 2700 rpm at 11,600 feet:Top speed in level flight 261 miles per hour (420 km/h) at 17,400 feet (5.3 km) with two wing bomb racks equipped and undroppable AN/APS-4 radar on special fitting

== Specifications (SC-1, float-equipped) ==
Data from Curtiss Aircraft 1907–1947

General characteristics

- Crew: 1
- Capacity: Facility for single stretcher patient
- Length: 36 ft 4.5 in (11.087 m)
- Wingspan: 41 ft 0 in (12.50 m)
- Height: 16 ft 0 in (4.88 m) on beaching gear
- Wing area: 280 sq ft (26 m^{2})
- Airfoil: root: NACA 23017; tip: NACA 23010
- Empty weight: 6,320 lb (2,867 kg)
- Gross weight: 9,000 lb (4,082 kg)
- Powerplant: 1 × Wright R-1820-62 Cyclone 9-cylinder air-cooled radial piston engine, 1,300 hp (970 kW)
- Propellers: 4-bladed constant-speed propeller

Performance

- Maximum speed: 235 mph (378 km/h, 204 kn) at 2,200 ft (670 m)
- Cruise speed: 125 mph (201 km/h, 109 kn)
- Range: 625 mi (1,006 km, 543 nmi)
- Service ceiling: 37,300 ft (11,400 m)
- Rate of climb: 2,500 ft/min (13 m/s)

Armament

- Guns: 2 × .50 in (12.70 mm) M2 Browning machine guns
- Bombs: 2 × 325 lb (147 kg) bombs under-wing

== See also ==
Aircraft of comparable role, configuration, and era

- Vought OS2U Kingfisher
- Nakajima A6M2-N

Related lists

- List of aircraft of World War II
- List of United States Navy aircraft designations (pre-1962)
