= 12-inch/50-caliber Mark 8 gun =

12"/50 caliber Mark 8 gun
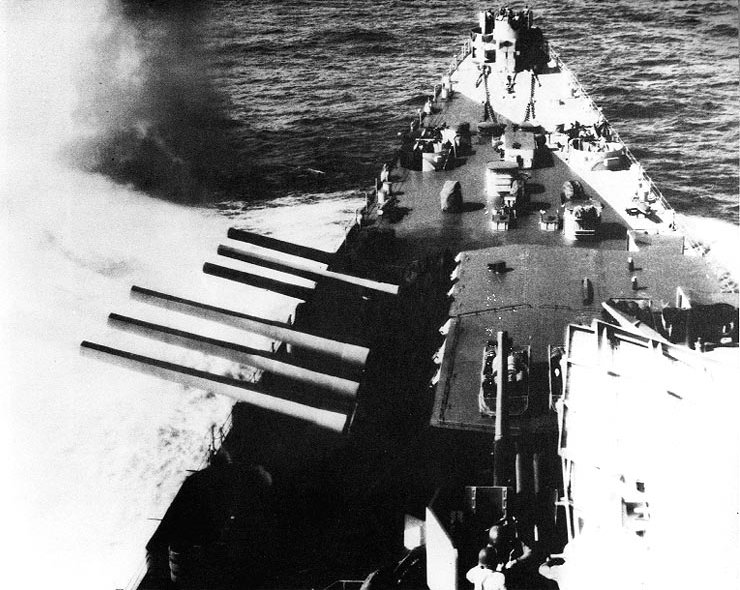
- USS Guam firing her 12"/50 guns during a training session sometime in 1944–1945.
- Type: Naval gun
- Place of origin: United States

Service history
- In service: 1944–1961
- Used by: Alaska-class cruisers
- Wars: World War II

Production history
- Designed: 1939
- Manufacturer: Naval Gun Factory, Midvale and Bethlehem Steel Corporation, Watervliet Arsenal

Specifications
- Barrel length: 50 feet (15.24 m) bore (50 cal)
- Shell: 1,140 pounds (520 kg)
- Caliber: 12 inches (304.8 mm)
- Rate of fire: 2.4–3.0 rounds per minute
- Maximum firing range: 38,021 yards (34,766 m)

The 12"/50 caliber gun Mark 8 was a US naval gun mounted on the Alaska-class cruiser. The gun, like the "large cruiser" that mounted it, was intended to fill the gap between US "heavy cruisers" (6-8") and US battleships (14-16"). The name describes the size of the shells, 12 inches in diameter, and the length of the bore in calibers (50 bore diameters).

== Design and production ==
The gun was designed in 1939, and a prototype was tested in 1942. Unlike previous guns, such as the 16"/45 caliber guns used on the North Carolina class, which were completely made and assembled at the Naval Gun Factory in Washington D.C., the forgings for the Mark 8 were manufactured at the Midvale and Bethlehem Steel corporations. They were then sent to the Naval Gun Factory for processing, which was followed by a trip to Watervliet Arsenal until they were 65% complete. Finally, the built-up guns were sent back to the Naval Gun Factory to be finished.

The gun was first deployed in 1944, on the lead ship of the Alaska class, USS Alaska. The two Alaska-class ships each had nine Mark 8 guns mounted in three triple (3-gun) turrets, with two turrets forward and one aft, a configuration known as "2-A-1". Only two vessels of the class were completed, making them the only applications of the Mark 8 12"/50 caliber gun.

== Measurements ==
The Mark 8 weighed 121,856 pounds (55,273 kg) including the breech and was capable of an average rate of fire of 2.4–3 rounds a minute. It could throw a 1,140 lb. (517 kg) Mark 18 armor-piercing shell 38,573 yards (35,271 meters) at an elevation of 45°. The previous 12" gun manufactured for the U.S. Navy was the Mark 7 version, used in the World War I era Wyoming-class battleships, could only throw an 870-pound (390 kg) shell 24,000 yards (21,946 m), at an elevation of 15° The Mark 8's significant improvement in firing weight and range over the Mark 7 gave it the honor of "by far the most powerful weapon of its caliber ever placed in service." In fact, as a result of the decision to fire "super heavy" armor-piercing projectiles, the Mark 8's deck plate penetration was better and the side belt armor penetration equal to the older (but larger) 14"/50 caliber gun.

The barrel life of the Mark 8 guns was 344 rounds, 54 more than the 16"/50 caliber Mark 7 gun found in the Iowa-class battleships.

== See also ==
- 16"/50 caliber Mark 7 gun
- 14"/50 caliber gun
