= USS Guam (CB-2) =

US Navy Alaska-class large cruiser

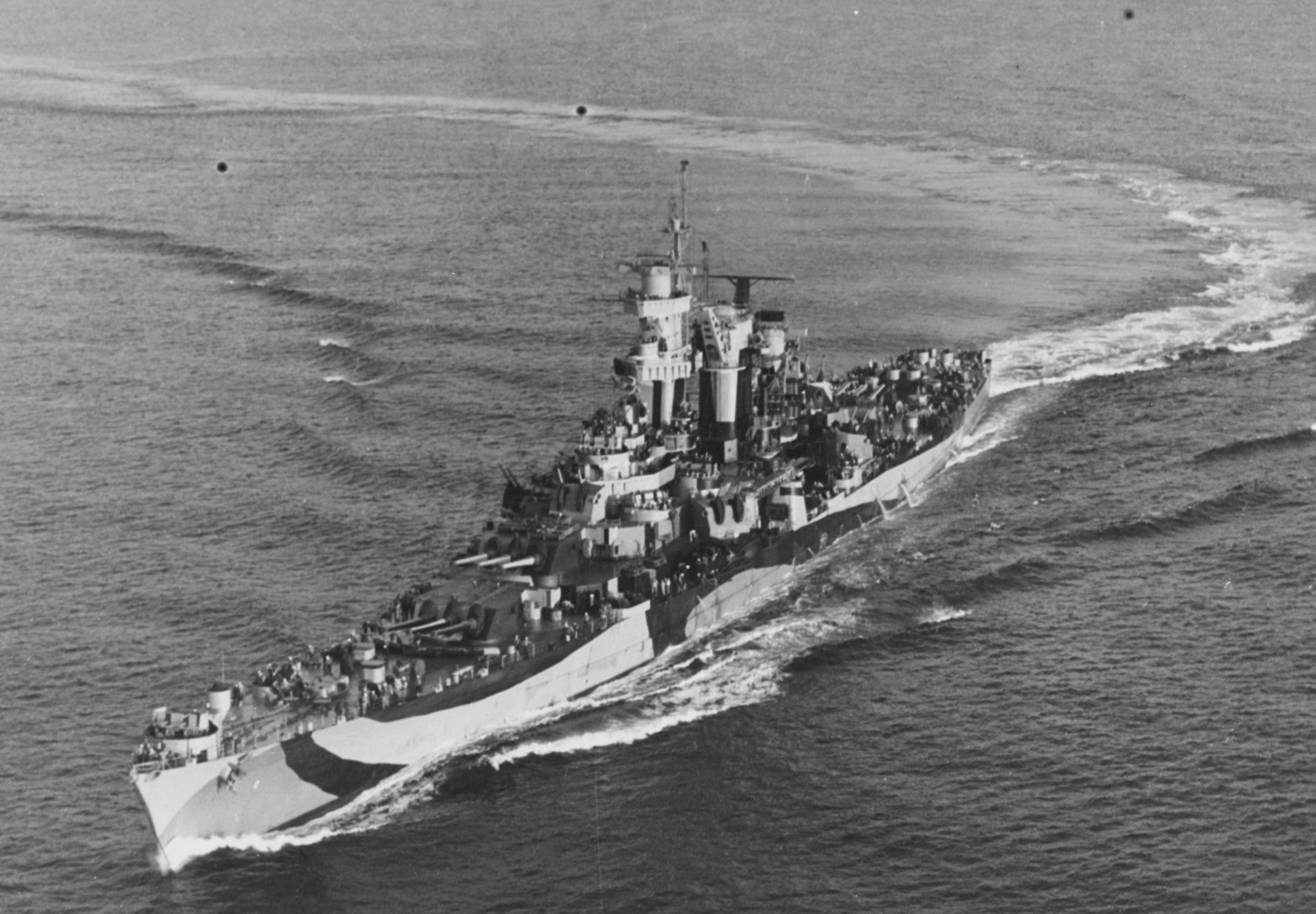
- USS Guam in 1944

History

United States
- Name: Guam
- Namesake: Guam
- Ordered: 9 September 1940
- Builder: New York Shipbuilding Corporation
- Laid down: 2 February 1942
- Launched: 12 November 1943
- Commissioned: 17 September 1944
- Decommissioned: 17 February 1947
- Stricken: 1 June 1960
- Identification: Hull number: CB-2
- Honors and awards: 2 battle stars
- Fate: Scrapped in May 1961

General characteristics
- Class & type: Alaska-class large cruiser
- Displacement: Standard: 29,779 long tons (30,257 t); Full load: 34,253 long tons (34,803 t)
- Length: 808 ft 6 in (246.4 m)
- Beam: 91 ft 1 in (27.8 m)
- Draft: 31 ft 10 in (9.7 m)
- Installed power: 8 × Babcock & Wilcox water-tube boilers; 153,000 shp (114,000 kW)
- Propulsion: 4 × General Electric steam turbines; 4 × screw propellers
- Speed: 33 knots (61 km/h; 38 mph)
- Range: 12,000 nmi (22,000 km; 14,000 mi) at 15 knots (28 km/h; 17 mph)
- Crew: 1,517
- Armament: 9 × 12 in (305 mm) guns; 12 × 5 in (127 mm) dual-purpose guns; 56 × 40 mm (1.6 in) guns; 34 × 20 mm (0.79 in) guns
- Armor: Belt: 9 in (229 mm); Deck: 4 in (102 mm); Conning tower: 10.6 in (270 mm); Turrets: 12.8 in (325 mm)
- Aircraft carried: 4

USS Guam was an Alaska-class large cruiser which served with the United States Navy during the last year of World War II. She was the second and last ship of her class to be completed. The ship was the second vessel of the US Navy to be named after the island of Guam, an American territory in the Pacific, and she was assigned the hull number CB-2. Due to her commissioning late in the war, Guam saw relatively limited service during the war. She participated in operations off Okinawa in March–July 1945, including providing anti-aircraft defense for the carrier task force and conducting limited shore bombardment operations. She participated in sweeps for Japanese shipping in the East China and Yellow Seas in July–August 1945. After the end of the war, she assisted in the occupation of Korea and transported a contingent of US Army troops back to the United States. She was decommissioned in February 1947 and placed in reserve, where she remained until she was stricken in 1960 and sold for scrapping the following year.

== Design ==
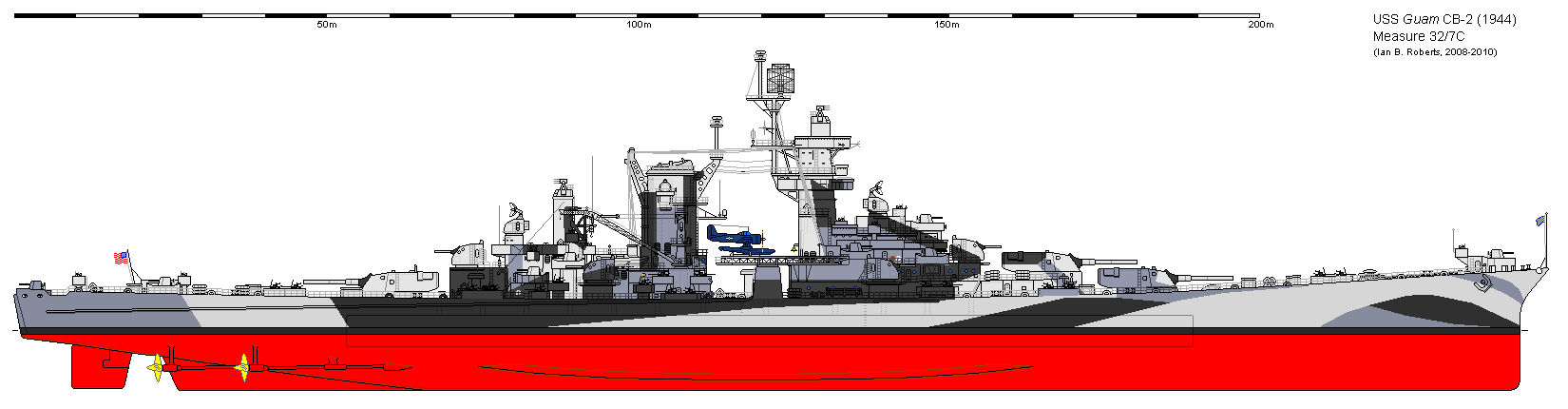
Guam as she appeared in 1944

The ship was 808 feet 6 inches (246.43 m) long overall and had a beam of 91 ft 1 in (27.76 m) and a draft of 31 ft 10 in (9.70 m). She displaced 29,779 long tons (30,257 t) as designed and up to 34,253 long tons (34,803 t) at full load. The ship had a flush deck with a flared bow and a rounded cruiser stern. She had a large superstructure that included an armored conning tower with a tall tower mast, along with a smaller, secondary conning position further aft. She carried four OS2U Kingfisher or SC Seahawk floatplanes, housed in two hangars, with a pair of aircraft catapults mounted amidships.

The ship was powered by four sets of General Electric geared steam turbines, each driving a screw propeller. Steam for the turbines was generated by eight oil-fired Babcock & Wilcox water-tube boilers, which were vented through a large funnel located amidships. The propulsion system was rated to produce 150,000 shaft horsepower (110,000 kW), generating a top speed of 33 knots (61 km/h; 38 mph). The ship had a cruising range of 12,000 nautical miles (22,000 km; 14,000 mi) at a speed of 15 kn (28 km/h; 17 mph).

The ship was armed with a main battery of nine 12 in (305 mm) L/50 Mark 8 guns in three triple gun turrets, two in a superfiring pair forward and one aft of the superstructure. (Note: L/50 refers to the length of the gun in terms of calibers. An L/50 gun is 50 times long as it is in bore diameter.) The secondary battery consisted of twelve 5 in (127 mm) L/38 dual-purpose guns in six twin turrets. Two were placed on the centerline superfiring over the main battery turrets, fore and aft, and the remaining four turrets were placed on the corners of the superstructure. The light anti-aircraft battery consisted of 56 quad-mounted 40 mm (1.6 in) Bofors guns and 34 single-mounted 20 mm (0.79 in) Oerlikon guns. A pair of Mk 34 gun directors aided gunlaying for the main battery, while two Mk 37 directors controlled the 5-inch guns and a Mk 57 director aided the 40 mm guns.

The main armor belt was 9 inches (229 mm) thick in the central portion of the hull, where it protected the propulsion machinery spaces and the ammunition magazines, thinning to 5 inches at either end. The main armor deck was 4 in (102 mm) thick. Her conning tower received 10.6 inches (270 mm) of armor plate on the sides. The gun turrets had 12.8-inch (325 mm) thick faces.

== Service history ==
Guam was authorized under the Fleet Expansion Act on 19 July 1940, and ordered on 9 September. She was laid down on 2 February 1942 at the New York Shipbuilding in Camden, New Jersey. She was launched on 12 November 1943 with the sponsorship of Annabel McMillin, wife of former Governor of Guam George J. McMillin (who was being held by the Japanese as a prisoner of war at the time), after which fitting-out work was effected. The ship was completed by September 1944, and she was commissioned into the US Navy on 17 September, under the command of Captain Leland Lovette. She was the second vessel of the US Navy to be named Guam; the first, a gunboat, was still in service but had been renamed Wake in January 1941 to free the name for the new cruiser.

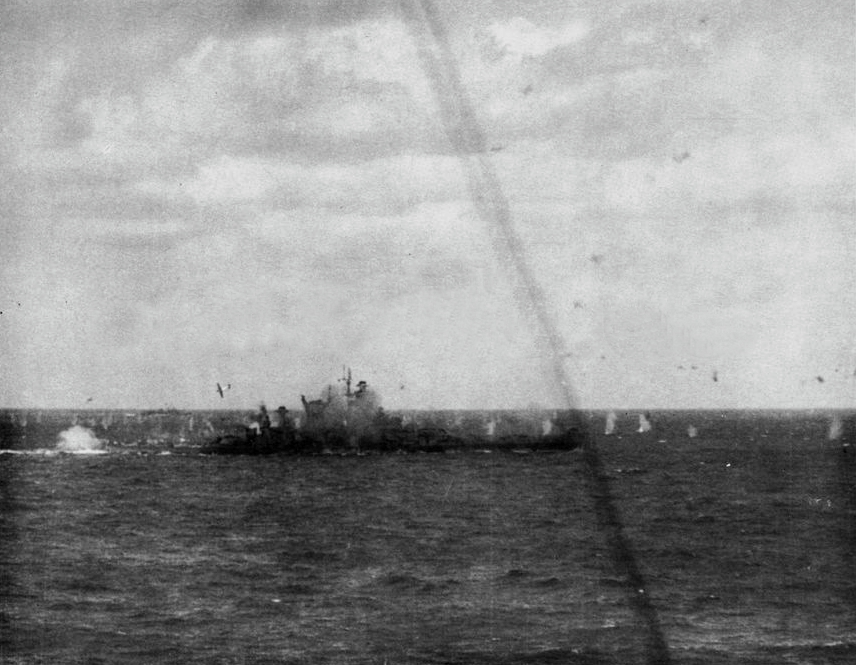
Guam under air attack, in 1945.

Guam left Philadelphia on 17 January 1945, after completing her shakedown cruise off Trinidad. She proceeded through the Panama Canal to join the United States Pacific Fleet in Pearl Harbor, which she reached on 8 February. While there, Secretary of the Navy James Forrestal visited the ship. On 3 March, she departed Hawaii for Ulithi, where she joined her sister Alaska on 13 March. Shortly thereafter, Guam and the rest of Task Force 58, the main strike force of the US Navy under the command of Admiral Arthur W. Radford, departed for a raid on the mainland Japanese islands of Kyushu and Shikoku. Task Force 58 arrived off Japan on the morning of 18 March and was quickly attacked by Japanese kamikazes and bombers. Guam was detached from the unit to escort the badly damaged carrier Franklin back to port, which lasted until 22 March.

Guam then returned to Task Force 58, assigned to Cruiser Division 16, part of Task Group 58.4, and steamed to Okinawa. On the night of 27–28 March, Guam and the rest of Cruiser Division 16 bombarded the airfield on Minamidaitō. After concluding the bombardment, Guam returned to the carrier screen while they conducted operations off Nansei Shoto until 11 May. The ship then steamed to Ulithi for periodic maintenance and to replenish ammunition and supplies. She then returned to Okinawa, assigned to Task Group 38.4 of William Halsey's Third Fleet. She continued to provide anti-aircraft defense for the carriers while they launched fighter sweeps of Kyushu. Guam and Alaska bombarded Oki Daitō for an hour and a half on 9 June, after which they steamed to San Pedro Bay in Leyte Gulf, arriving on 13 June.

After returning to Okinawa in July, Guam was assigned to Cruiser Task Force 95, where she served as the flagship, along with her sister Alaska, under the command of Rear Admiral Francis S. Low. On 16 July, Guam and Alaska conducted a sweep into the East China and Yellow Seas to sink Japanese shipping. They had only limited success, however, and returned to the fleet on 23 July. They then joined a major raid, which included three battleships and three escort carriers, into the estuary of the Yangtze River off Shanghai. Again, the operation met with limited success, and they returned to Okinawa by 7 August.

Shortly after returning to Okinawa, Guam became the flagship of the North China Force, again commanded by Rear Admiral Low. The unit was tasked with showing the flag in the region, including the ports of Qingdao, Port Arthur, and Dalian. On 8 September, Guam entered Jinsen, Korea, to assist in the occupation of the country. She left Jinsen on 14 November bound for San Francisco, carrying a group of Army soldiers back to the United States. She arrived in port on 3 December and departed two days later for Bayonne, New Jersey, arriving on the 17th. She remained there until she was decommissioned on 17 February 1947. She was then assigned to the Atlantic Reserve Fleet, where she remained until she was stricken from the Naval Vessel Register on 1 June 1960. She was sold on 24 May 1961 for $423,076 to the Boston Metals Company in Baltimore. She was towed to the shipbreakers on 10 July 1961. Guam had served only 29 months on active duty.
