= Battle of El Bramadero =

- Part of the United States occupation of Nicaragua, Banana Wars
- Battle of El Bramadero (Nicaragua)
Date	27–28 February 1928
Location	near El Bramadero, Nicaragua
Result	Sandinista victory

Belligerents
United States	Sandinistas

Commanders and leaders
(United States) Lt. Edward O'Day (Initial force) (United States) Cap. William K. MacNulty (Relief force)	(Nicaragua) Miguel Angel Ortez

Strength
36 marines one naval pharmacist 22 Nicaraguan "muleros" 99 mules (Initial force); 88 marines (Relief force)	600 guerrillas 4+ machine guns

Casualties and losses
5 marines killed (two died from wounds); 8 marines wounded, four "muleros" wounded 33 mules killed, wounded, or captured	10 killed 30 wounded ("conservative estimate" for losses on 28 February 1928)

The Battle of El Bramadero, or the Battle of Bromaderos, took place between the 27 and 28 February 1928 during the American occupation of Nicaragua of 1926–1933 and the Sandino Rebellion. The battle began on the twenty-seventh when a convoy of thirty-six Marines, one American naval pharmacist's mate, twenty Nicaraguan "muleros," two Nicaraguan "'Jefe' muleros," and 99 mules led by First Lieutenant Edward F. O'Day moving along the Yalí–Condega trail was ambushed by a force of Sandinista rebels led by Miguel Angel Ortez.

The Sandinistas opened fire from all along the mule train's right flank at 1:30 PM, while some other rebels managed to seal off "the trail to the front and rear of the convoy." These Nicaraguan insurrectionists were estimated to be "at least" 600 rifles strong, armed with "a minimum" of four machine guns and "a large quantity" of dynamite bombs. The Marines fell back to a ridge on the left of the trail, "leaving three of their dead behind." The guerrillas advanced on the American position and hacked open the heads of the dead Marines with their machetes. At 8:30, the firing from the Sandinistas decreased as the insurgents began to withdraw, although about 200 of them remained to continue harassing the Marines. Some of the guerrillas spoke "irregular English" and taunted the Americans with "slurs and insults" during lulls in the fighting.

At dawn of the following day, of the 28 February, a force of 88 Marines led by Captain William K. MacNulty arrived on the battlefield to relieve O'Day's men, and they helped drive off the remaining Sandinistas. All in all, the Marines suffered three killed, two died from wounds, and eight non-fatally wounded (in addition, four of their "muleros" were wounded). One-third of their mules were killed, wounded, or captured. Sandinista losses for February 28 were about 10 killed and 30 wounded (this was MacNulty's "conservative estimate").

A "large part" of the rebel force at El Bramadero was recruited from nearby towns and villages, with these part-time guerrillas returning to their homes and regular occupations when fighting ceased, owner of LA PRENSA said he received a number of empty gasoline cans with marines heads inside.
