= Guam Insular Force Guard =

Former military formation of Guam

The Guam Insular Force Guard was a former military formation of Guam. It was created in 1901.

== History ==
After gaining control of Guam during the 1898 Spanish–American War, the United States declared the entire island of Guam a naval installation that led to the US Navy governing the island.

On 5 April 1901, President William McKinley created the Insular Force of the U.S. Navy, authorizing the Secretary of the Navy to enlist up to 500 natives of Guam and the Philippines. Originally nine men strong at their formation, the force rose to 85 ratings by 1906 in order to protect U.S. Navy installations in Guam.

The strength of the Guard was 110 men organised and uniformed in the manner of the U.S. Navy but received half the pay of the corresponding American naval ratings. Rather than being classed as members of the U.S. Navy, the Guardsmen were classified as "native seamen".

With the situation in the Pacific growing more tense the Guard was increased in size to 234 men. The Guard was armed with the same weapons as the U.S. Navy, M1903 Springfield rifles, Thompson submachine guns, and Lewis Guns, however with the increase to the size of the Guard there were not enough weapons to go around.

During the Battle of Guam in December 1941, four members of the Guard were killed in action with 22 men wounded. Insular Force Guardsmen were held as prisoners of war on Guam instead of being shipped to Japan.

== Legacy ==
The Guam Insular Force Memorial in Hagatna commemorates the history and bravery of the unit.
