= William K. MacNulty =

United States Marine Corps general

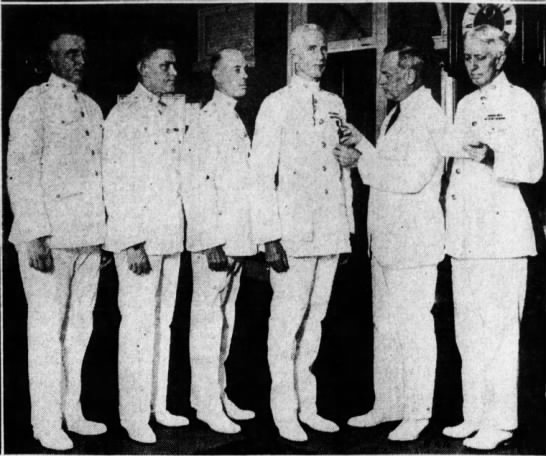
- In 1930, Capt. William K. MacNulty (second from far left) and three other U.S. Marine Corps officers are awarded the Navy Cross for their service in the Banana Wars by Ass. Secretary of Navy Ernest Lee Jahncke (second from far right). At far right is Maj. Gen. Ben H. Fuller, Commandant of the Marine Corps.
- Born: May 22, 1892; Antrim, Pennsylvania, U.S.
- Died: August 3, 1964 (aged 72) San Francisco, California, U.S.
- Buried: Golden Gate National Cemetery; San Bruno, California
- Allegiance: United States of America
- Branch: United States Marine Corps
- Rank: Brigadier General
- Service number: 0-587
- Conflicts: World War I: Meuse-Argonne Offensive; Banana Wars: Occupation of Nicaragua; World War II: First Battle of Guam
- Awards: Navy Cross; Silver Star

William Kirk MacNulty (May 22, 1892 in Antrim, Pennsylvania – August 3, 1964) was a U. S. Marine. He was a U.S. Marine Corps second lieutenant during World War I and saw action at the Battle of the Argonne Forest. He served as a captain during the Second U.S. Nicaraguan Campaign (1926–1933). During the Second World War, as a lieutenant colonel he commanded the U.S. Marine Corps defense of Guam against Imperial Japanese forces during the First Battle of Guam. He was incarcerated by the Japanese as a prisoner of war. He was promoted to brigadier general during captivity and retired from military service in 1946. He is buried at the Golden Gate National Cemetery in San Bruno, San Mateo County, California.

== World War I (U.S. 1917–18) ==
As a second lieutenant, William K. MacNulty (MCSN: 0-587) was awarded the silver star for gallantry in action against an enemy of the United States while serving with the Sixth Regiment (Marines), Second Division, American Expeditionary Forces during the Meuse-Argonne Offensive (also known as the Battle of the Argonne Forest) September 30 to November 11, 1918.

== Second U.S. Nicaraguan Campaign (1926–33) ==
As a U.S. Marine Corps Captain, MacNulty was awarded the Navy Cross for heroic action in combat at the Battle of El Bramadero during the Second U.S. Nicaraguan Campaign.

"Navy Cross is presented to William K. MacNulty for distinguished service in the line of his profession as commander of a patrol operating in the vicinity of Bromoderos, Nicaragua, on 27 February 1928. Captain MacNulty, while on a mission assigned by his Battalion Commander, upon receiving word that a platoon of the 57th Company had been ambushed by a numerically superior force, immediately upon his own initiative proceeded to the scene, made a night march over unknown, most difficult terrain, in a bandit-infested area. Upon arrival at the spot, Captain MacNulty disposed his patrol with such military ability and strategy as to successfully defeat and put to rout the bandit force, thereby saving the lives of the remaining few of the beleaguered patrol, which were at that time greatly outnumbered.

== Battle of Guam ==
At the very outbreak of World War II, during the Battle of Guam on December 8, 9 and 10, 1941, then, Lt. Col. MacNulty's 153-man U.S. Marine barracks of a U.S. Armed Forces island garrison of 424, outfitted with only small arms and mounted .30 caliber machine guns, defended Guam against the successful attack of then Japanese Maj. Gen. Tomitarō Horii's 5,500 man ground force, supported by the Japanese Fourth Fleet's heavy cruiser Aoba, destroyers Yuzuki, Kihuzuki, Uzuki and Oboro, 12 naval transports, 4 gunboats, 5 subchasers, a minesweeper squadron and other auxiliaries, which under command of Japanese Adm. Shigeyoshi Inoue, prior, surrounded Guam, and, also, air forces from then Japanese Saipan. Guam was the first piece of American soil surrendered during the war. MacNulty's 153 Marines suffered 13 dead and 37 wounded (losses and other casualties of near one third their compliment) before ordered to surrender by a beleaguered U.S. Naval Captain and Guam Governor George Johnson McMillin, who was, then, himself, confronting 400 armed Japanese ground troops with defense of only an 80-man native Insular Force Guard. MacNulty's U.S. Marines, however, could take comfort that with the Japanese attack forces preparations, deployment and predominant withdrawal, the U.S. Marines' tiny, otherwise, insignificant, presence at Guam, because of a Japanese intelligence mistake, had tied down 6,000 first-class Japanese enemy combat troops, a cruiser and support ships and aircraft for well over a month.

== Promotion as P.O.W. and, subsequent, retirement ==
MacNulty was promoted to brigadier general in 1942. He retired from military service in 1946. He died in 1964 at the age of 72.

== Medals and decorations ==
Here are some medals and decorations of Brigadier General MacNulty:

Navy Cross
Silver Star
Prisoner of War Medal
Second Nicaraguan Campaign Medal
World War II Victory Medal (United States)
