= USS YP-17 =

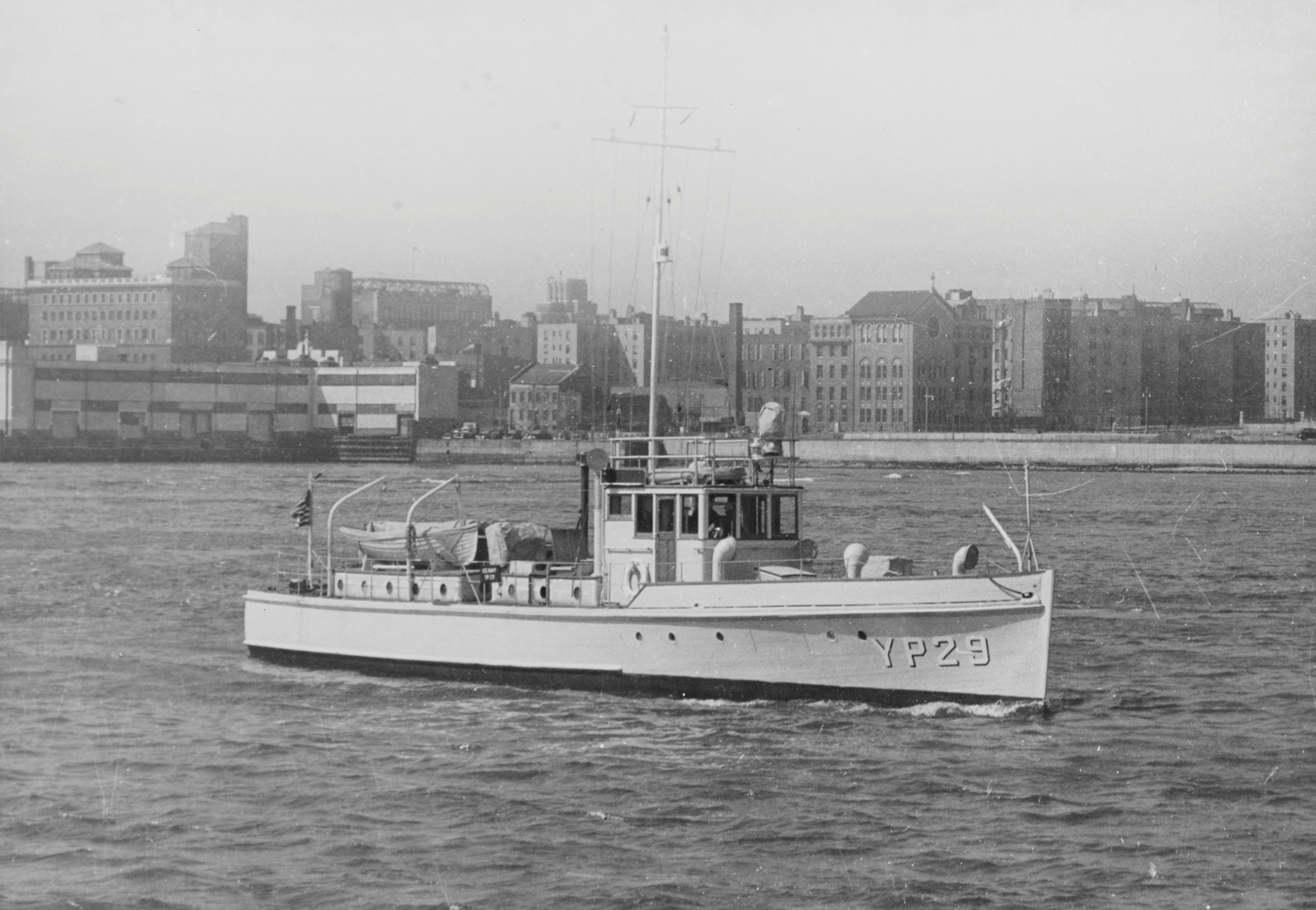
- Sister ship YP-29 (ex CG-116) in 1941

United States Coast Guard
- Name: CG-275
- Ordered: 1924
- Builder: Lake Union Dry Dock and Machine Works, Seattle
- Commissioned: 1925
- Identification: code letters: NAMM
- Fate: Transferred to United States Navy, 21 June 1933

United States Navy
- Name: YP-17
- Acquired: 21 June 1933
- Reclassified: YP-17
- Stricken: 24 July 1942
- Home port: Agana, Guam
- Identification: code letters: NEJC
- Honours and awards: 1 Battle Star; American Defense Service Medal; Asiatic-Pacific Campaign Medal; World War II Victory Medal
- Fate: captured, 10 December 1941

General characteristics
- Tonnage: 37.5 GRT
- Length: 74.9 ft (22.8 m) o/a
- Beam: 13.6 ft (4.1 m)
- Draught: 3.75 ft (1.14 m)
- Installed power: 500 SHP
- Propulsion: two Sterling 6-cylinder gasoline engines, two propellers
- Complement: 8
- Armament: 1 x 1-pounder gun forward

USS YP-17 was a wooden-hulled patrol vessel in commission in the fleet of the United States Coast Guard as CG-275 from 1925 to 1933, and in the fleet of the United States Navy as YP-17 from 1933 until 1941. She was captured by Japanese forces during the Japanese attack on Guam.

== History ==
She was laid down at the Seattle shipyard of the Lake Union Dry Dock and Machine Works, Seattle, one of 203 "Six-Bitters" ordered by the United States Coast Guard. She was designed for long-range picket and patrol duty during Prohibition for postings 20 to 30 miles from shore. The date of her launching and completion is uncertain although the class design was finalized in April 1924 and all of the Six-Bitters were commissioned by 1925. She was commissioned in 1925 as CG-275.

On 21 June 1933, she was transferred to the United States Navy and designated as a Yard Patrol Craft (YP). She was assigned to the 13th Naval District where she trained reservists. On 22 October 1940, she along with her sister ship YP-16, were delivered to Guam aboard the replenishment oiler USS Ramapo for duty as a patrol boat and for island defense.

On 10 December 1941, during the Japanese attack on Guam, she was attacked and damaged by Japanese aircraft. Her crew was unable to set her ablaze (the fate of her sister ship, YP-16) before she was captured by the Japanese. She was struck from the Naval List on 24 July 1942. Her crew was sent to Japanese internment camps. Her ultimate fate is unknown.

She was awarded one battle star.
