= USS YP-18 =

American military ship

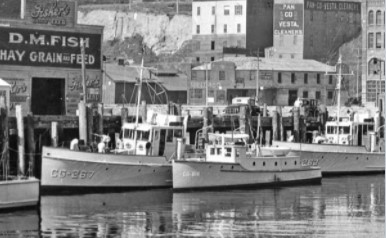
- CG-263 astern of CG-267 and CG-816, Port Townsend, Washington, 1920s

United States Coast Guard
- Name: CG-263
- Ordered: 1924
- Builder: Lake Union Dry Dock and Machine Works, Seattle
- Commissioned: 1925
- Identification: code letters: NEBF
- Fate: Transferred to United States Navy, 21 February 1934

United States Navy
- Name: YP-18
- Acquired: 21 February 1934
- Reclassified: YP-19
- Stricken: 25 November 1938
- Fate: unknown

General characteristics
- Tonnage: 37.5 GRT
- Length: 74.9 ft (22.8 m) o/a
- Beam: 13.6 ft (4.1 m)
- Draught: 3.75 ft (1.14 m)
- Installed power: 500 SHP
- Propulsion: two Sterling 6-cylinder gasoline engines, two propellers
- Complement: 8
- Armament: 1 x 1-pounder gun forward

USS YP-18 was a wooden-hulled patrol vessel in commission in the fleet of the United States Coast Guard as CG-263 from 1925 to 1934, and in the fleet of the United States Navy as YP-18 from 1934 until 1938.

== History ==
She was laid down at the Seattle shipyard of the Lake Union Dry Dock and Machine Works, one of 203 "Six-Bitters" ordered by the United States Coast Guard. She was designed for long-range picket and patrol duty during Prohibition for postings 20 to 30 miles from shore. The date of her launching and completion is uncertain although the class design was finalized in April 1924 and all of the Six-Bitters were commissioned by 1925. She was commissioned in 1925 as CG-263. On 21 February 1934, she was transferred to the United States Navy and designated as a Yard Patrol Craft (YP). She was assigned to the 13th Naval District where she trained reservists. She was struck from the Naval List on 25 November 1938.
