= USS Penguin (AM-33) =

Minesweeper of the United States Navy

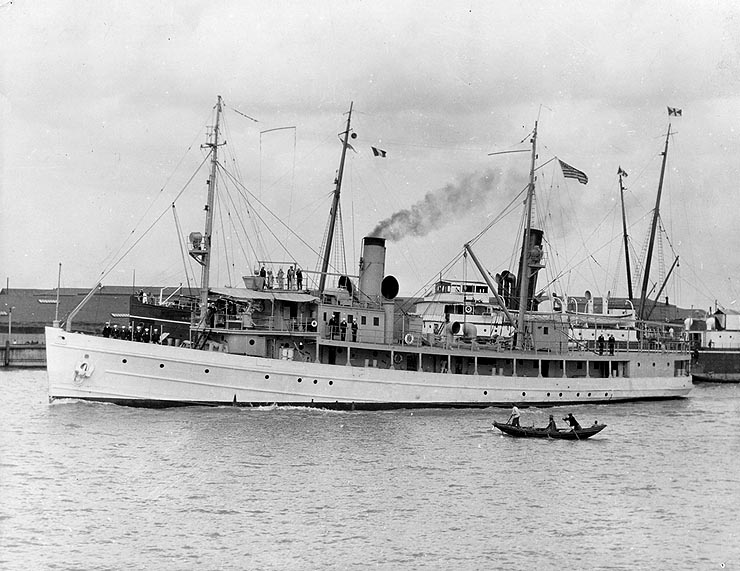

History

United States
- Name: USS Penguin
- Builder: New Jersey Dry Dock and Transportation Co., Elizabethport, New Jersey
- Laid down: 17 November 1917
- Launched: 12 June 1918
- Commissioned: 21 November 1918, as Minesweeper No.33
- Reclassified: AM-33, 17 July 1920
- Fate: Scuttled, 8 December 1941

General characteristics
- Class & type: Lapwing-class minesweeper
- Displacement: 1,009 long tons (1,025 t) full load
- Length: 187 ft 10 in (57.25 m)
- Beam: 35 ft 6 in (10.82 m)
- Draft: 10 ft 4 in (3.15 m)
- Speed: 14 knots (26 km/h; 16 mph)
- Complement: 78
- Armament: 2 × 3 in (76 mm) guns

USS Penguin (AM-33) was a Lapwing-class minesweeper acquired by the United States Navy, named after the bird.

Penguin was laid down on 17 November 1917 at the New Jersey Dry Dock and Transportation Co., Elizabethport, New Jersey; launched on 12 June 1918; and commissioned on 21 November 1918.

== North Sea minesweeping operations ==
Penguin, commissioned too late for service during World War I, performed minesweeping and salvage work in the New York City area until sailing for Kirkwall, Scotland, on 22 May 1919. On 5 June she reported to the North Sea Minesweeping Detachment. Fitted out with "electrical protective devices", she was soon busy in the post-war clearing of the North Sea Mine Barrage.

On 9 July a mine exploded in her kite, causing minor damage. In August, while laying buoys for the sixth sweeping operation, she suffered a similar explosion, with more severe results. Temporary repairs restored her to working condition until a lengthy repair and overhaul period at Chatham prepared her to sail homeward.

== Pacific Ocean operations ==
Penguin returned to New York in November, then sailed to join the Pacific Fleet's Mine Squadron 4, with which she operated, in the eastern Pacific, until decommissioned and placed in reserve at Pearl Harbor on 1 June 1922.

Recommissioned on 13 October 1923, she was fitted out for temporary service as a gunboat and assigned to the Asiatic Fleet. Sailing west she took up duties as a Yangtze Patrol vessel, operating out of Shanghai. She remained on China station until the end of the decade, then sailed to Cavite, whence she steamed to Guam, where she was homeported for the remainder of her naval career.

During the 1930s she performed various services for the administrators of Guam, including patrol and rescue missions in areas traversed by the newly established transpacific air routes. However, with increased political tension in the Far East, and increased possibilities for war, her patrol duties were stepped up and took on a more defensive posture.

== World War II and sinking ==
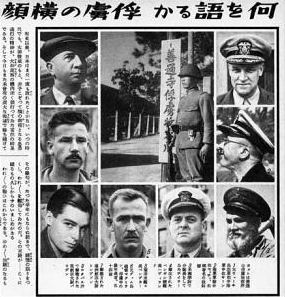
Captain Haviland of the USS Penguin at the bottom row 2nd from right

Early on the morning of 8 December 1941 (7 December east of the International Date Line) she returned to Guam's Agana Harbor from a patrol to receive word of the Japanese attack on Pearl Harbor. Soon thereafter Japanese aircraft attacked the island, starting the Battle of Guam. Bombs fell on fuel storage tanks and shore installations. Penguin slipped her mooring and moved outside the harbor to gain maneuvering space and attacked the bombers with anti-aircraft fire, shooting down one aircraft, but she was then bombed and strafed. There were no direct bomb hits, but a group of bombs straddled the ship, killing one, wounding over sixty, and causing extensive damage. Then, in 1,200 feet (370 m) of water, she was scuttled to prevent her capture by the enemy. Her crew made the shore in life rafts; those not seriously wounded continued the defense of Guam.
