= Battle of Guam (1941) =

WWII Battle by Japanese forces to capture Guam from the United States

- Part of the Pacific Theater of World War II
Date	8–10 December 1941 (2 days)
Location	Guam, United States
Result	Japanese victory
Territorial changes	Japanese occupation of Guam

Belligerents
United States	Japan

Commanders and leaders
George J. McMillin (surrendered)	Tomitaro Horii

Strength
Land: 547 marines and sailors Sea: 1 minesweeper 2 patrol boats 1 freighter	Land: 5,900 infantry and marines Sea: 4 heavy cruisers 4 destroyers 2 gunboats 6 submarine chasers 2 minesweepers 2 tenders Air: unknown air forces

Casualties and losses
17 killed 35 wounded 406 captured 1 minesweeper scuttled 1 patrol boat scuttled 1 patrol boat captured 1 freighter damaged	1 killed 6 wounded 1 aircraft destroyed
- Thirteen American civilians and five POWs were killed by Japanese forces during the battle.; Three Japanese infiltrators were captured by American forces, but were released upon the surrender of the island.

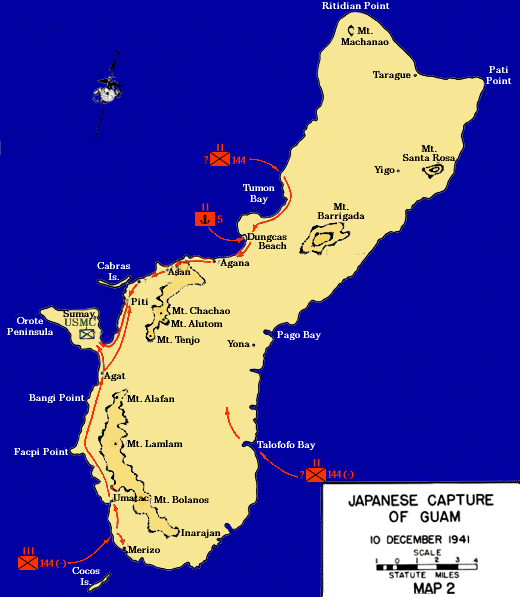
Japanese landings on Guam

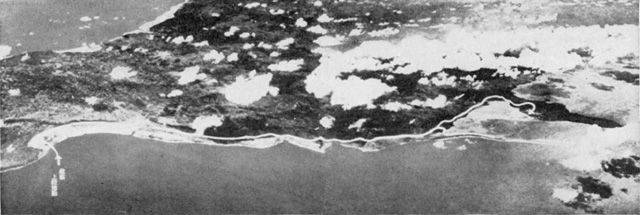
Illustration of the route Japanese forces followed during the invasion

The Battle of Guam was an engagement during the Pacific War in World War II that took place from 8 to 10 December 1941 on Guam in the Mariana Islands between Japan and the United States. The American garrison was defeated by Japanese forces on 10 December, which resulted in an occupation until the Second Battle of Guam in 1944.

== Background ==
Guam is the southernmost part of the Mariana Islands in the Pacific Ocean. It is the largest of the islands, with an area of 225 square miles. Guam's interior is rugged, with heavy tropical forests in the north of the island and wooded hills in the south. Much of the island's coastline is edged with coral reefs and cliffs, though beaches suitable for landing troops exist in the center of the west coast. Guam has a tropical climate, though December forms part of the dry season.

The United States captured Guam from the Kingdom of Spain on 21 June 1898 during the Spanish–American War. The next year Spain sold the other islands in the Marianas chain to Germany. The United States Navy established a facility near the village of Piti in 1899, and the United States Marine Corps (USMC) opened a barracks at Sumay in 1901. A naval coaling station was established on the island in 1905, and a battery of six 6-inch (15 cm) guns was emplaced to strengthen Guam's defenses in 1909. A U.S. Navy captain served as both governor of Guam and commander of the naval base from 1899 onwards, though there were some elements of a civilian government on the island.

During World War I, Japanese forces captured the German-controlled islands in the Marianas during October 1914 and established a garrison which was designated the South Seas Defense Force. Japan gained a mandate over the islands from the League of Nations in December 1920, and they were administered by the South Seas Bureau which formed part of the Ministry of Overseas Affairs. Japanese colonists were permitted to settle in the Marianas, and by the late-1930s there were more colonists than natives in the islands. In 1935 the Japanese Government banned Westerners from entering its mandated islands in the Pacific and in 1939 established the 4th Fleet to defend the region.

While the United States considered increasing Guam's defenses during and after World War I, no action was taken other than to deploy a USMC seaplane unit to the island in 1921. The outcomes of the 1922 Washington Naval Conference included an agreement by both the United States and Japanese governments that they would not further fortify the islands they administered in the western Pacific, including the Marianas. As a result, no improvements were made to Guam's defenses during the 1920s and 1930s, the island's coastal artillery battery was removed by 1930, and the USMC seaplane unit departed in 1931. The U.S. Navy sought permission to build fortifications on the island in 1938, but this proposal was rejected.

In 1941 Guam had a population of 23,394, most of whom lived in or within 10 miles (16 km) of the island's capital of Agana. The island had about 85 miles (137 km) of improved roads, and Apra Harbor was considered the best in the Marianas, but the island did not have an airfield.

== Prelude ==
Japanese plans for the Pacific War included capturing Guam in the war's early days. From March 1941, Japanese aircraft flew photo reconnaissance sorties over the island. Plans for the invasion of the island were completed in September 1941, and the South Seas Detachment was selected as the main unit responsible for this. The South Seas Detachment included the 144th Infantry Regiment and other units detached from the 55th Division, a total of 4,886 men. The South Seas Detachment was concentrated in Korea during November 1941 and, following a brief stay in Japan, sailed for Chichi-jima in the Bonin Islands late that month. The 370-man strong 5th Company of the 2nd Maizuru Special Naval Landing Force, which was based at Saipan in the Marianas, was also assigned to join the assault on Guam. These units would be transported to Guam by nine transports escorted by the minelayer Tsugaru and four destroyers. The 6th Cruiser Division, composed of four heavy cruisers, was also available to provide support if needed. The landing force and naval units were supported by the 18th Naval Air Corps, which was based at Saipan and equipped with obsolete floatplanes.

The United States government did not believe that it would be possible or practical to defend Guam if it was attacked. The island was not seen as being useful in efforts to reinforce the Philippines, though it served as a refueling point for Pan Am flying boats and was one of the relay points for the Pacific Cable Company's telegraph cable which linked the Philippines to the US West Coast. In 1941, the island was given a "Category F" defense rating; this ruled out the construction of new defenses and meant that, if war broke out, Guam's defenders were to destroy all facilities of military value and withdraw. Despite this and with only small arms available to them for their defense, the U.S. Marines stationed on the island under the command of Lieutenant Colonel William K. MacNulty, fortified their positions and put up a defense against the subsequent Japanese aerial assault of the island, while suffering losses and other casualties of nearly one-third of their complement.

Despite the low priority accorded to Guam, some minor steps were taken by other commands to improve Guam's defenses before war broke out. A contract for minor improvements to the military facilities on Guam was issued in April 1941, and work began the next month. The Guam Insular Force Guard, which was a local militia responsible for protecting the naval base, was also slightly expanded in May. On 17 October dependents of American military personnel on the island were evacuated to the United States by the transport USS Henderson, followed by more than 1,000 construction workers. On 23 October the US Navy's General Board provided Secretary of the Navy Frank Knox with a report on Guam's defenses which recommended against reinforcing the island because of the difficulties of defending it and the need to allocate resources to other priorities. The report argued in favor of continuing to improve Guam's harbor and seaplane facilities.

At the outbreak of war on 8 December 1941 (local time), Guam was defended by small US Navy and USMC units as well as the Insular Force Guard. Captain George McMillin, who was the island's governor and the overall commander of the garrison, was in charge of naval forces, Guam, which amounted to 271 personnel and four nurses. This force was a subordinate unit of the Asiatic Fleet, and most of its personnel were unarmed. Guam's guard ship, the USS Gold Star, had sailed to the Philippines to pick up supplies and enable the crew to buy Christmas presents and was directed to remain there. The minesweeper USS Penguin was present at the island, along with the immobile oil depot ship Robert L. Barnes, and two old yard patrol boats YP-16 and YP-17. Marine barracks, Sumay, had a strength of 145 men who were organised into a company armed with rifles and a small number of machine guns. The Insular Force Guard included 246 men, most of whom had received little training. The Marines and Insular Force Guard were equipped with 170 M1903 Springfield rifles, 13 Lewis guns, and 15 Browning Automatic Rifles. The defenders did not have any mortars or artillery other than the guns on board Penguin. In addition to these military units, Guam's police force (the Guam Insular Patrol) had a strength of 80 men, who were armed only with pistols.

== Battle ==
At 04:44 on 8 December McMillin was informed of the attack on Pearl Harbor. At 08:27 Japanese land-based aircraft from Saipan attacked the Marine barracks, Piti Navy Yard, Libugon radio station, Standard Oil Company, and the Pan American Hotel. During the air attack, the USS Penguin was sunk after shooting down at least one Japanese airplane. One officer was killed and several men wounded. The air raids all over Guam continued into the morning and afternoon before subsiding at 17:00.

At 08:30 on 9 December Japanese air attacks resumed, with no more than nine aircraft attacking at a time. The same targets as the previous day were attacked, and also the Government House in Agana and several villages. That evening, a Japanese invasion fleet of four heavy cruisers, four destroyers, two gunboats, six submarine chasers, two minesweepers, two destroyer tenders, and ten transports (Yokohama Maru, China Maru, Cheribin Maru, Clyde Maru, Daifuku Maru, Kogyoku Maru, Matsue Maru, Moji Maru, Nichimei Maru, and Venice Maru) left Saipan for Guam. A mistake in their intelligence-gathering had caused the Japanese to overcommit resources and attack Guam with disproportionate force.

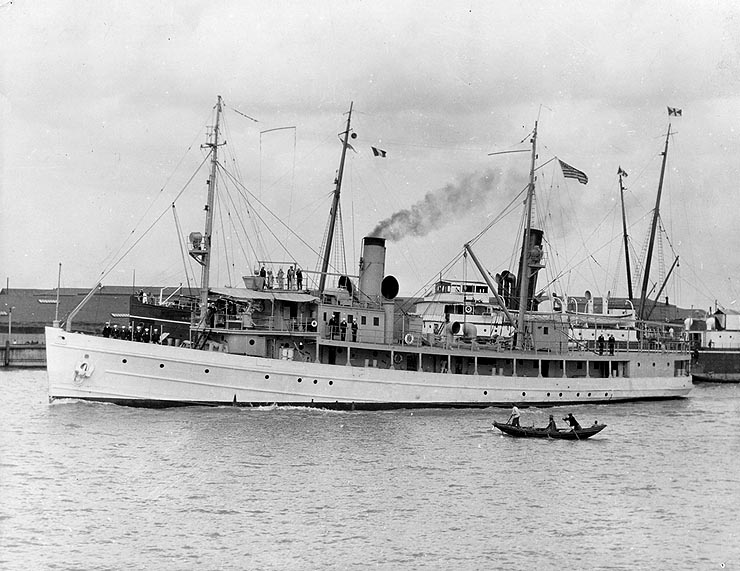
USS Penguin

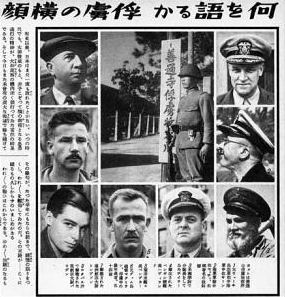
Allied officers captured by Japan; Captain Haviland of the USS Penguin (bottom row, 2nd from the right)

The Japanese landed about 400 troops of the 5th Defence Force from Saipan on Guam in the early morning of 10 December 1941 at Dungcas Beach, north of Agana. They quickly defeated the Insular Force Guard in Agana. They advanced on Piti, moving toward Sumay and the Marine barracks. The principal engagement took place on Agana's Plaza de España at 04:45, when a few marines and Insular Force guardsmen fought the Japanese attackers. After token resistance, the Marines, on McMillin's orders, surrendered at 05:45. McMillin officially surrendered at 06:00. A few skirmishes took place all over the island before news of the surrender spread and the rest of the island forces laid down their arms. YP-16 was scuttled by means of fire, and YP-17 was captured by Japanese naval forces. An American freighter was damaged by the Japanese.

In the meantime, the Japanese South Seas Detachment, about 5,500 men under the command of Major General Tomitarō Horii, made separate landings at Tumon Bay in the north, on the southwest coast near Merizo, and on the eastern shore of the island at Talofofo Bay.

US Marine losses were five killed and 13 wounded (including the prior Japanese air assault of the island, the Marines' losses were 13 dead and 37 wounded). The US Navy lost eight killed, and four of the Guam Insular Force Guards were killed and 22 others wounded. One Japanese naval soldier was killed and six wounded. Private First Class John Kauffman was killed by the Japanese after the surrender.

Thirteen American civilians were killed by the Japanese during the battle. Six US Navy seamen evaded capture by the Japanese; five were eventually taken by the Japanese and beheaded, while Radioman First Class George Ray Tweed survived with the help of local Chamorros. They moved him from village to village, sometimes endangering their own families for his protection. The Japanese knew that an unknown American could not hide without some form of help. Consequently, Chamorro suspects were questioned, tortured, and beheaded. Despite the abuses, Chamorros loyal to the United States protected Tweed, who managed to evade the Japanese during their occupation of Guam for two years and seven months until he was rescued prior to the Second Battle of Guam.

== See also ==
- Attacks on the United States
