= Lake Union Dry Dock Company =

Full-service shipyard in Seattle, USA

Coordinates: 47.63327°N 122.32758°W

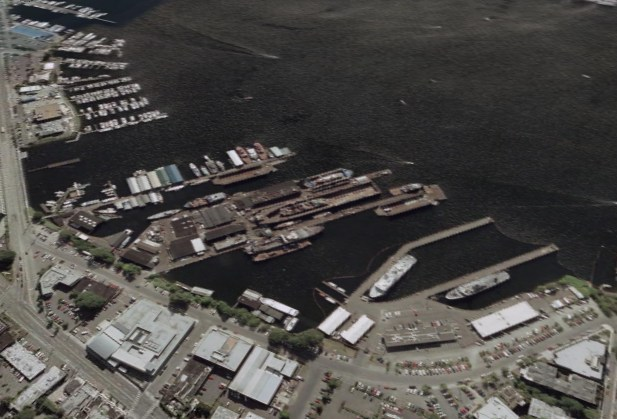
- Lake Union Dry Dock Company
- Founded: 1919; 107 years ago in Seattle
- Founders: Otis Cutting; John McLean
- Headquarters: Lake Union, Seattle, Washington, USA
- Services: Vessel repair and conversion
- Website: www.ludd.com

Lake Union Dry Dock Company is a full-service shipyard that specializes in vessel repair and conversions located in Seattle, Washington. Drydocking vessels up to 6,000 tonnes (5,900 long tons; 6,600 short tons), (420 feet (130 m) in length), Lake Union Dry Dock Company repairs factory trawlers, fishing vessels, Coast Guard Cutters and buoy tenders, tugboats, research vessels, ferries, mega-yachts, barges, and houseboats.

Lake Union Dry Dock Company was founded by Otis Cutting and John McLean in 1919 to build and service watercraft vessels. Located along the eastern shore of Lake Union, Lake Union Dry Dock Company is among the longest operating shipyards in the United States. Accessible via the Hiram A. Chittenden (Ballard) Locks, Lake Union provides refuge from tides as well as the marine life and corrosive saltwater of Puget Sound.

== Company history ==
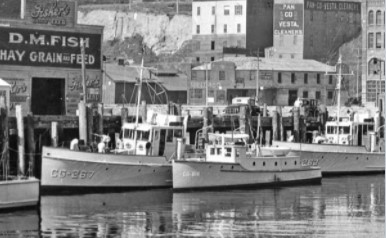
Lake Union-built CG-263 and CG-267 at Port Townsend, Washington in the 1920s (CG-816 is adjacent)

In 1919, during the Post-World War I recession, Otis Cutting and John McLean started a partnership when they jointly purchased waterfront property on Lake Union and established the Lake Union Dry Dock Company.

Between 1920 and 1954, Lake Union Dry Dock Company constructed a total of 63 vessels, the majority of which were not yachts. During Prohibition, rum-runners used fast boats to transport alcohol along “rum-lines” where they risked passage between ports in the western waters of both the USA and Canada. To address this challenge, the US Coast Guard commissioned Lake Union Dry Dock Company to construct fifteen 75-foot patrol boats (CG-263 through CG-277), an effort that achieved Lake Union Dry Dock Company economic viability as well as recognition for the craft and quality of the vessels they built.

Following the start to their business, in 1923 Cutting and McLean hired R.M. Mooney, a former Marmon Automobiles agent. Inspired by Henry Ford's assembly line, Mooney implemented repeatable manufacturing processes to produce a stock cruiser, the Lake Union Dreamboat, to achieve a price point more accessible to yachting enthusiasts.

From 1928-1930, Lake Union Dry Dock Company worked with noted yacht designer, Ted Geary, and built a series of four, 96-foot-long (29 m), fantail yachts (Principia, Blue Peter, Electra, and Canim); each created with classic lines, luxurious joiner work, and fittings. The company also made two sailing yachts: Pirate and Circe. Both vessels remained functional till 2019.

== Second World War ==
Operating under the name Associated Shipbuilders in a joint venture with the nearby Puget Sound Bridge and Dredging Company on Harbor Island, a small number of yard minesweepers were built for the United States Navy.

- 18 of 481 YMS-1-class minesweepers
  - BYMS-9 ... BYMS-14
  - YMS-287 ... YMS-298

== Post WWII ==
In 1946 Harry Jones, an attorney, and George H. Stebbins, a marine engineer, joined forces to purchase Lake Union Dry Dock Company, a union that would be followed by three subsequent generations. Much like their predecessors, Jones and Stebbins took over just after a world war. The post WWII era was lean, but the abundant market for of ship repairs and dedication to craft enabled Lake Union Dry Dock Company to thrive.

A contract performed between 1952 and 1953, during the Korean War, resulted in construction of four 144-foot-long (44 m) minesweepers. This would be the last multi vessel construction contract that Lake Union Dry Dock Company would perform.

During the 1960s and 1970s, Lake Union Dry Dock Company focused on vessel conversion and repair work. Alaska's rapid growth in that era caused a significant increase in the demand for repair of freighters, tugs and barges that supplied goods to the state. In response to an increase in marine traffic, additional US Coast Guard vessels were stationed in the region, each requiring periodic repair. Additionally, the Alaska Marine Highways System looked to Lake Union Dry Dock Company to service and refit vessels for their ferry fleet.

The passing of the Magnuson–Stevens Fishery Conservation and Management Act in 1976 brought growth to the fishing industry in Alaska; dozens of US factory trawlers, catcher boats and longliners arrived on the scene and Lake Union Dry Dock Company became the principle repair source for the North Pacific trawler fleet. Between fishing seasons, it was not uncommon for several 200–300 feet (61–91 m) trawlers to be in the yard simultaneously. Yard craftspeople adapted to the specific needs of the fleet and developed new skills.

In 1976, the yard acquired ex-USS White Sands (ARD-20), an Auxiliary repair dock ship. This required the ship with an 81 foot (25 m) beam to pass through the 80 foot (24 m) wide Hiram M. Chittenden Locks in Ballard. This was accomplished by heeling the ship to 38 degrees with ballast water then with 1,226 short tons (1,112 t) of ballast blocks and steel plates, plus additional buoyancy.

Along with all the industry shifts, servicing wooden vessels remained a mainstay of Lake Union Dry Dock Company's operation. Capitalizing on the opportunity to maintain wooden minesweepers, Lake Union Dry Dock Company assembled vessel-specific tooling and established craft training to service sophisticated componentry. In 1990, after the Invasion of Kuwait, the US Navy enlisted Lake Union Dry Dock Company to prepare the Seattle-based Minesweeper Offshore (MSO) fleet for transit to the Persian Gulf.

In 1994, the Taiwanese Navy contracted with Lake Union Dry Dock to refurbish and then transport four Mine Sweeper Offshore (MSO) to Taiwan. This job required a workforce of 140 craftspeople to concurrently perform repairs on all four vessels. In need of 70 shipwrights, who were difficult to recruit by 1990 due to changes in the labor market, Lake Union Dry Dock Company had to search Washington, Oregon, California, Alaska and British Columbia to assemble an appropriately skilled team. As part of the contract, Lake Union Dry Dock Company provided training to the Taiwanese maintenance staff. To fulfill the transport requirement to Taiwan, the shipyard found and prepared a heavy lift ship to deck-load and transit the four 176 foot (54 m) minesweepers, once delivered, Lake Union Dry Dock Company's relationship with wooden Naval Minesweepers was concluded.

Between 1995 and 2001 Lake Union Dry Dock Company worked in collaboration with the Virginia V Foundation to successfully restore the Virginia V; the last operational wooden steam passenger ship of its kind.

== Company today ==
Lake Union Dry Dock Company, in its 103rd year of business in 2019, remained a full-service shipyard specializing in vessel repair and conversions. Lake Union Dry Dock Company vessel repairs includes factory trawlers, longliners and catcher boats, deep sea and harbor tugs, barges, US Coast Guard ships including buoy tenders, medium and high endurance cutters and high-speed patrol craft, Washington State Ferries and regional high-speed passenger ferries, NOAA vessels, large yachts, and assorted commercial vessels.
