= USS YP-16 =

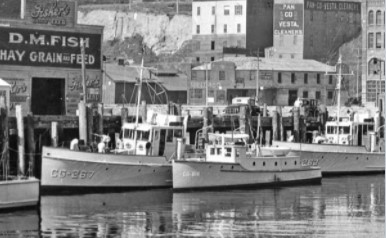
- CG-267 aside CG-816 and forward of CG-263, Port Townsend, Washington, 1920s

United States Coast Guard
- Name: CG-267
- Ordered: 1924
- Builder: Lake Union Dry Dock and Machine Works, Seattle
- Commissioned: 1925
- Home port: Bremerton, Washington
- Identification: code letters: NAML
- Fate: Transferred to United States Navy, January 1934

United States Navy
- Name: YP-16
- Acquired: January 1934
- Reclassified: YP-16
- Stricken: 24 July 1942
- Home port: Agana, Guam
- Honours and awards: 1 Battle Stars; American Defense Service Medal; American Campaign Medal; Asiatic-Pacific Campaign Medal; World War II Victory Medal
- Fate: Sunk by enemy aircraft, 10 December 1941

General characteristics
- Tonnage: 37.5 GRT
- Length: 74.9 ft (22.8 m) o/a
- Beam: 13.6 ft (4.1 m)
- Draught: 3.75 ft (1.14 m)
- Installed power: 500 SHP
- Propulsion: two Sterling 6-cylinder gasoline engines, two propellers
- Complement: 8
- Armament: 1 x 1-pounder gun forward

USS YP-16 was a wooden-hulled patrol vessel in commission in the fleet of the United States Coast Guard as CG-267 from 1925 to 1934, and in the fleet of the United States Navy as YP-16 from 1934 until 1941. She was sunk by Japanese aircraft during the Japanese attack on Guam.

== History ==
She was laid down at the Seattle shipyard of the Lake Union Dry Dock and Machine Works, Seattle, one of 203 "Six-Bitters" ordered by the United States Coast Guard. She was designed for long-range picket and patrol duty during Prohibition for postings 20 to 30 miles from shore. The date of her launching and completion is uncertain although the class design was finalized in April 1924 and all of the Six-Bitters were commissioned by 1925. She was commissioned in 1925 as CG-267. In January 1934, she was transferred to the United States Navy and designated as a Yard Patrol Craft (YP). She was assigned to the 13th Naval District where she trained reservists. On 22 October 1940, she along with her sister ship YP-17, were delivered to Guam aboard the replenishment oiler Ramapo for duty as a patrol boat and island defense. On 10 December 1941, she was attacked and severely damaged by Japanese aircraft; her crew burned the hulk to avoid capture during the Japanese attack on Guam. She was struck from the Naval List on 24 July 1942. Her crew was captured and sent to Japanese internment camps.

She was awarded one battle star.
