= List of battlecruisers =

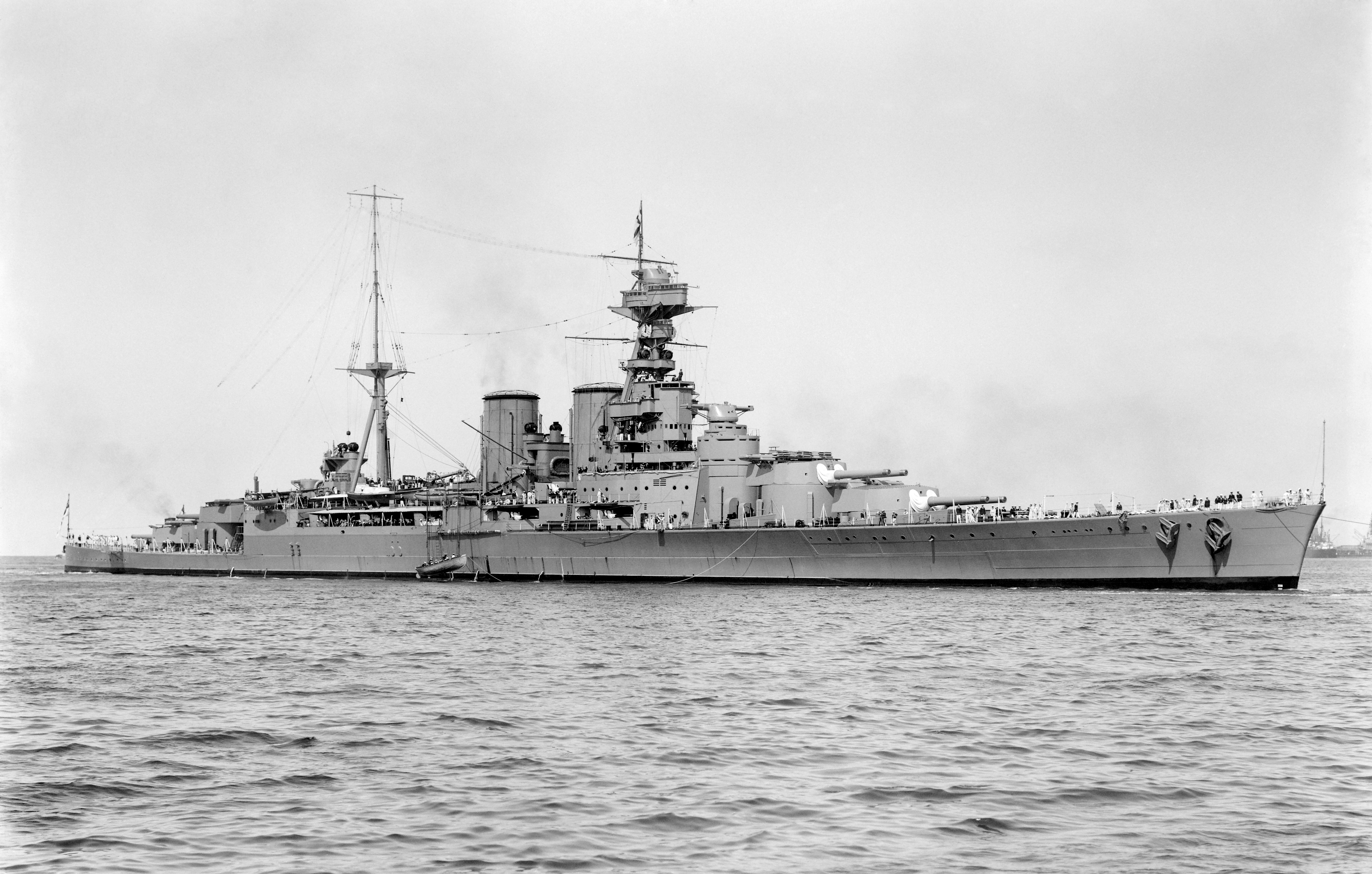
The United Kingdom's HMS Hood in Australia, 17 March 1924

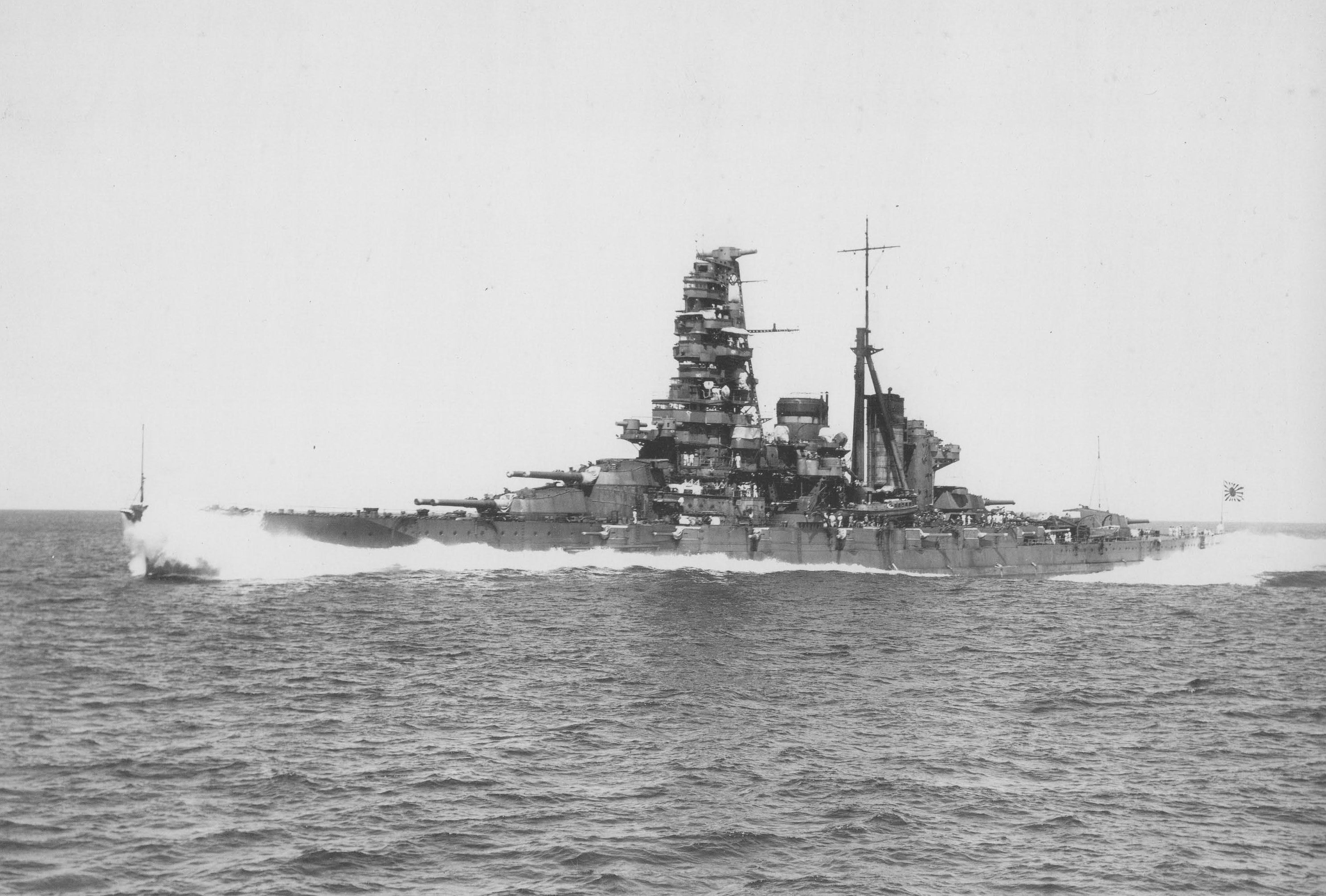
Japan's Haruna in 1934, following her second reconstruction

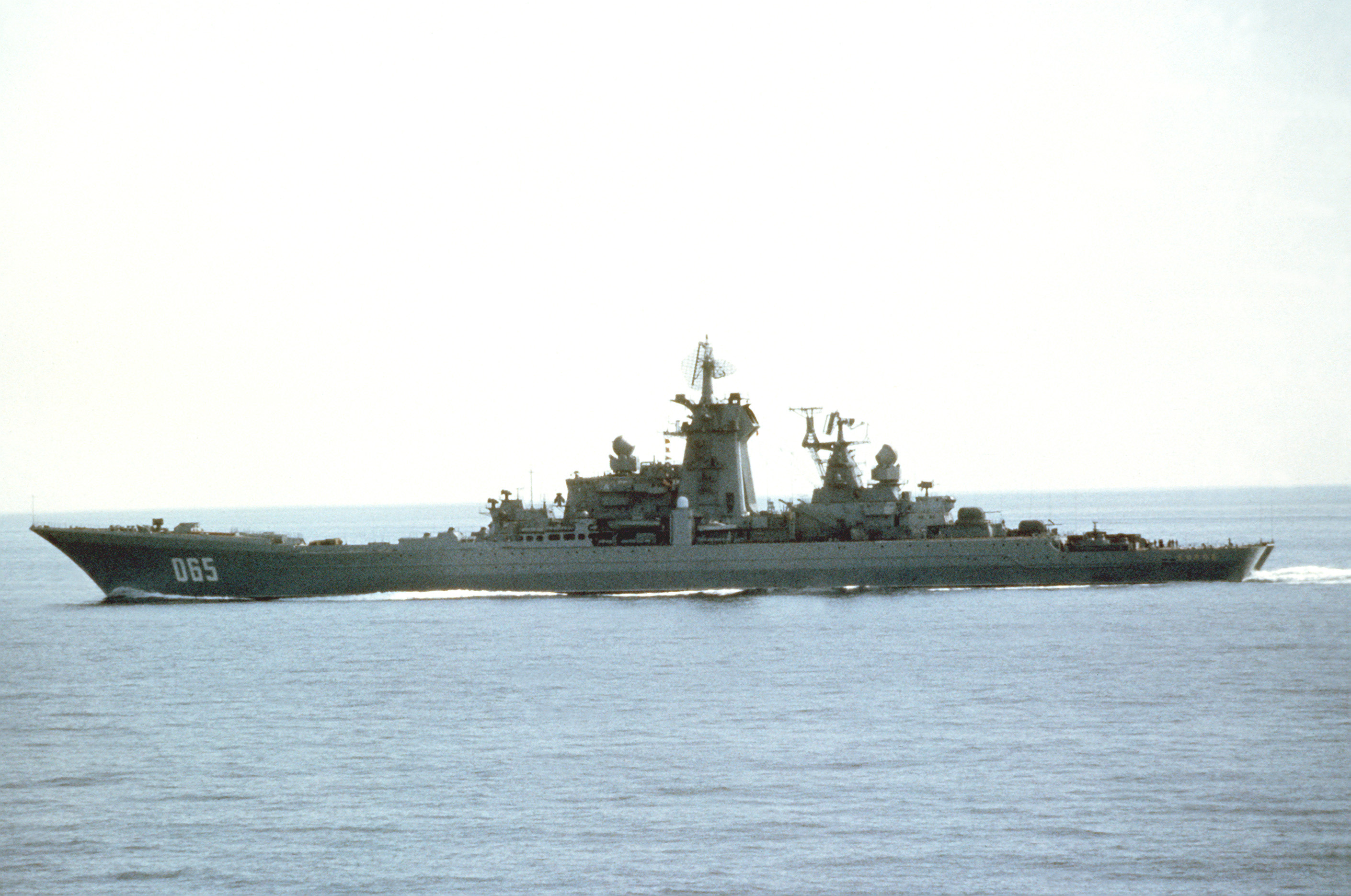
Russia's Kirov-class battlecruisers are the only surviving type.

During the first half of the 20th century, many navies constructed or planned to build battlecruisers: large capital ships with greater speed but less armor than dreadnought battleships. The first battlecruisers, the Invincible class, were championed by the British First Sea Lord John Fisher and appeared in 1908, two years after the revolutionary battleship HMS Dreadnought. In the same year, Germany responded with its own battlecruiser, SMS Von der Tann. Over the next decade, Britain and Germany built an additional twelve and six battlecruisers, respectively. Other nations joined them: HMAS Australia entered service for the Royal Australian Navy in 1913, Japan constructed four ships of the Kongō class from 1911 through 1915, and in late 1912 Russia laid down the four Borodino-class battlecruisers, though they were never completed. Two countries considered acquiring battlecruisers in this time, but chose not to: France looked at several battlecruiser design studies in 1913 and 1914, and the United States ordered six Lexington-class battlecruisers in 1916 that were never built.

The British and German battlecruisers were used extensively during World War I between 1914 and 1918, including in the Battles of Heligoland Bight and Dogger Bank, and most famously in the Battle of Jutland on 31 May and 1 June 1916, where one German and three British battlecruisers were sunk. The Japanese battlecruisers did not see action during the war, as the German naval presence in the Pacific was destroyed by the British in the early months of the war. Britain and Germany attempted to build additional battlecruisers during the war—the Admiral class for the former, and the Mackensen and Ersatz Yorck classes for the latter—but changing priorities in favor of smaller warships prevented their completion. At the end of the war, the German High Seas Fleet was interned and subsequently scuttled in Scapa Flow.

In the immediate aftermath of World War I, Britain, Japan, and the United States all considered new battlecruiser construction, including the British G3 class, the Japanese Amagi class, and a revised version of the American Lexingtons. In the interest of avoiding another crippling naval arms race, the three countries, along with France and Italy, signed the Washington Naval Treaty in 1922, which included a moratorium on new capital ship construction. A clause in the treaty, however, gave the British, Japanese, and Americans a chance to convert several of their battlecruisers into aircraft carriers. Only a handful of battlecruisers survived the arms limitation regime. In the 1930s, several navies considered new "cruiser killer" battlecruisers, including Germany's O class, the Dutch Design 1047, and the Soviet Kronshtadt class. The outbreak of World War II in September 1939 put a halt to all these plans.

During the war, the surviving battlecruisers saw extensive action, and many were sunk. The four Japanese Kongō-class ships had been rebuilt as fast battleships in the 1930s, but all were sunk during the conflict. Of the three British battlecruisers still in service, HMS Hood and Repulse were sunk, but Renown survived the war. The only other battlecruiser in existence at the end of the Second World War was the ex-German Goeben, which had been transferred to Turkey during the First World War and served as Yavuz Sultan Selim.

Several new wartime classes were proposed, including the Japanese Design B-65 class, and the American Alaska class, two of which were built before the end of the war. The Alaskas were officially classified as "large cruisers", but many naval historians refer to them as battlecruisers. In the postwar drawdown of forces, Renown and the two Alaskas were withdrawn from service and eventually scrapped; Only Yavuz Sultan Selim, the last surviving battlecruiser in the world, lingered on until the early 1970s, when she too was sent to the shipbreakers. Only one country, the Soviet Union, considered building battlecruisers after the war. The three Stalingrad-class ships, championed by Joseph Stalin, were laid down in the early 1950s, but were cancelled after his death in 1953. However, in the 1970s, the Soviet Union began the construction of a class of very large guided missile cruisers, much larger than any other surface combatant (Note: Surface combatants are naval warships which are designed for warfare on the surface of the water, with their own weapons. They include battleships, battlecruisers, cruisers, destroyers, frigates, and corvettes. Aircraft carriers, amphibious assault ships, and mine hunters are not considered surface combatants. Thus, it would be incorrect to say that Kirov battlecruisers are the largest class of naval warship built since the Second World War, since many aircraft carriers built after the war have been larger.) built since the Second World War. This new type, the Kirov-class, although designated as a "heavy nuclear-powered missile cruiser" by the Soviet Navy, was generally referred to in the West as a "battlecruiser".

== Key ==
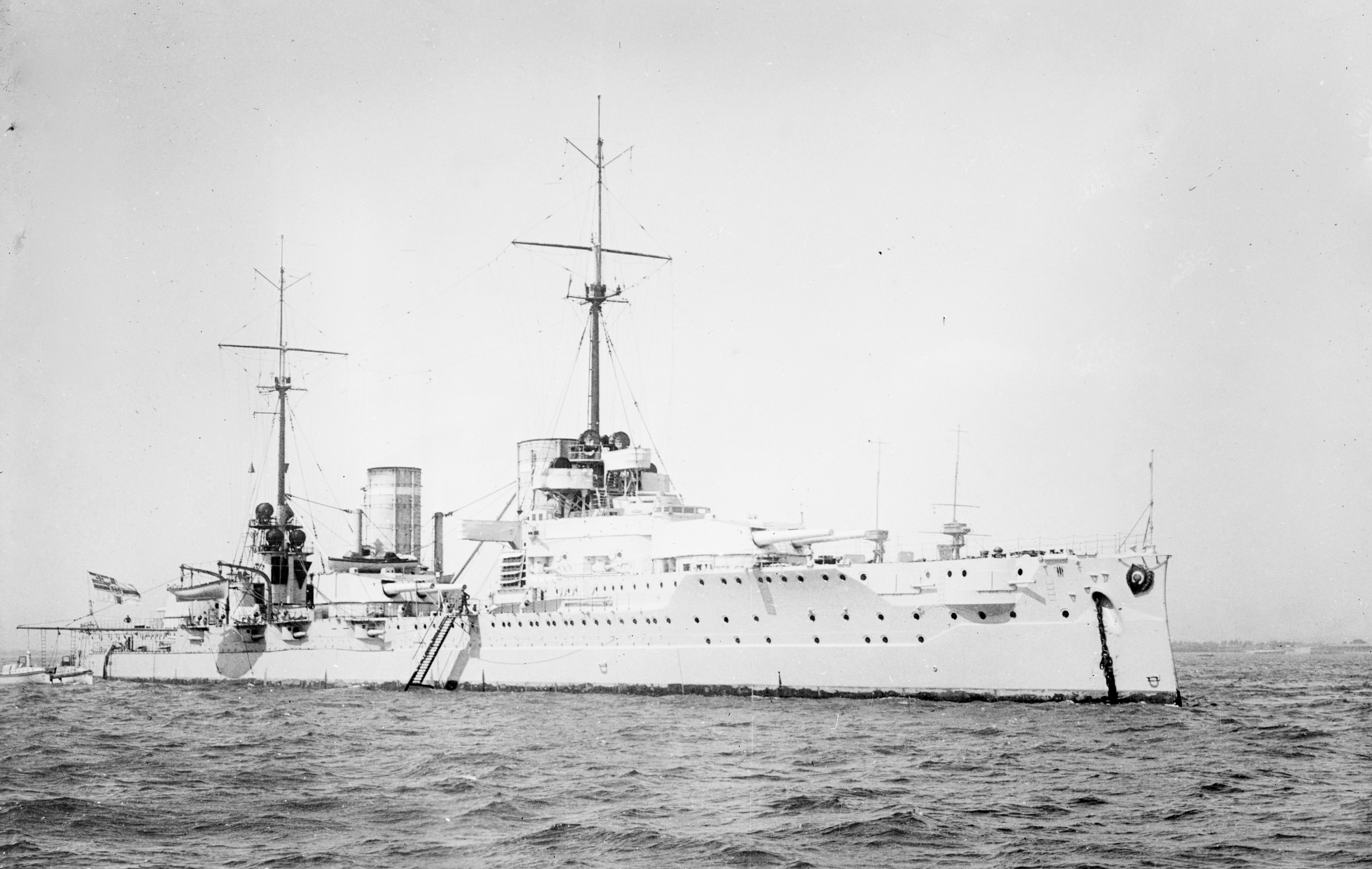
SMS Von der Tann, Germany's first battlecruiser

The list of battlecruiser classes includes all battlecruisers listed in chronological order by commission. Classes which did not enter service are listed by the date of cancellation or last work on the project. (Note: The German Scharnhorst-class battleships and Deutschland-class cruisers and the French Dunkerque-class battleships are all sometimes referred to as battlecruisers. Since neither their operators nor a significant number of naval historians did/do not classify them as such, they are not included in this list.)

Main guns	The number and type of the main battery guns
Armor	The maximum thickness of the belt armor
Displacement	Ship displacement at full combat load
Propulsion	Number of shafts, type of propulsion system, and top speed generated
Service	The dates work began and finished on the ship and its ultimate fate
Laid down	The date the keel began to be assembled
Commissioned	The date the ship was commissioned (Note: The table for Russia gives the date of launching rather than commissioning, since none of its battlecruisers were commissioned. Similarly, the United States' table gives dates of launch and commissioning for those ships that did enter service.)

== Great Britain ==
Ship	Main guns	Armor	Displacement	Propulsion	Service		
Ship	Main guns	Armor	Displacement	Propulsion	Laid down	Commissioned	Fate
HMS Invincible	8 × 12-inch (305 mm)	6 inches (152 mm)	20,420 long tons (20,748 t)	4 screws, steam turbines, 25 kn (46 km/h; 29 mph)	2 April 1906	20 March 1909	Exploded at the Battle of Jutland, 31 May 1916
HMS Inflexible	8 × 12-inch (305 mm)	6 inches (152 mm)	20,420 long tons (20,748 t)	4 screws, steam turbines, 25 kn (46 km/h; 29 mph)	5 February 1906	20 October 1908	Sold for scrap, 1 December 1921
HMS Indomitable	8 × 12-inch (305 mm)	6 inches (152 mm)	20,420 long tons (20,748 t)	4 screws, steam turbines, 25 kn (46 km/h; 29 mph)	1 March 1906	20 June 1908	Sold for scrap, 1 December 1921
HMS Indefatigable	8 × 12-inch	6 inches	22,430 long tons (22,790 t)	4 screws, steam turbines, 25 kn (46 km/h; 29 mph)	23 February 1909	24 February 1911	Exploded at the Battle of Jutland, 31 May 1916
HMS New Zealand	8 × 12-inch	6 inches	22,430 long tons (22,790 t)	4 screws, steam turbines, 25 kn (46 km/h; 29 mph)	20 June 1910	19 November 1912	Sold for scrap, 19 December 1922
HMS Lion	8 × 13.5-inch (343 mm)	9 inches (229 mm)	30,820 long tons (31,315 t)	4 screws, steam turbines, 28 kn (52 km/h; 32 mph)	29 November 1909	4 June 1912	Sold for scrap, 31 January 1924
HMS Princess Royal	8 × 13.5-inch (343 mm)	9 inches (229 mm)	30,820 long tons (31,315 t)	4 screws, steam turbines, 28 kn (52 km/h; 32 mph)	2 May 1910	14 November 1912	Scrapped, beginning 13 August 1923
HMS Queen Mary	8 × 13.5-inch	9 inches	31,844 long tons (32,355 t)	4 screws, steam turbines, 28 kn (52 km/h; 32 mph)	6 March 1911	4 September 1913	Exploded at the Battle of Jutland, 31 May 1916
HMS Tiger	8 × 13.5-inch	9 inches	33,260 long tons (33,794 t)	4 screws, steam turbines, 28 kn (52 km/h; 32 mph)	6 June 1912	3 October 1914	Sold for scrap, February 1932
HMS Renown	6 × 15-inch (381 mm)	6 inches	32,220 long tons (32,737 t)	4 screws, steam turbines, 31.5 kn (58.3 km/h; 36.2 mph)	25 January 1915	20 September 1916	Sold for scrap, August 1948
HMS Repulse	6 × 15-inch (381 mm)	6 inches	32,220 long tons (32,737 t)	4 screws, steam turbines, 31.5 kn (58.3 km/h; 36.2 mph)	25 January 1915	14 November 1916	Sunk by Japanese air attack, 10 December 1941
HMS Courageous	4 × 15-inch	2 inches (51 mm)	22,560 long tons (22,922 t)	4 screws, steam turbines, 32 kn (59 km/h; 37 mph)	28 March 1915	28 October 1916	Sunk by U-29, 17 September 1939
HMS Glorious	4 × 15-inch	2 inches (51 mm)	22,560 long tons (22,922 t)	4 screws, steam turbines, 32 kn (59 km/h; 37 mph)	1 May 1915	14 October 1916	Sunk by the German battleships Scharnhorst and Gneisenau, 8 June 1940
HMS Furious	2 × 18-inch (457 mm)	2 inches (51 mm)	22,890 long tons (23,257 t)	4 screws, steam turbines, 32 kn (59 km/h; 37 mph)	8 June 1915	26 June 1917	Sold for scrap, 15 March 1948
HMS Hood	8 × 15-inch	12 inches	46,680 long tons (47,429 t)	4 screws, steam turbines, 31 kn (57 km/h; 36 mph)	1 September 1916	15 May 1920	Sunk by the German battleship Bismarck, 24 May 1941
HMS Anson	8 × 15-inch	12 inches	46,680 long tons (47,429 t)	4 screws, steam turbines, 31 kn (57 km/h; 36 mph)	9 November 1916	Suspended, March 1917	Cancelled, 27 February 1919
HMS Howe	8 × 15-inch	12 inches	46,680 long tons (47,429 t)	4 screws, steam turbines, 31 kn (57 km/h; 36 mph)	16 October 1916	Suspended, March 1917	Cancelled, 27 February 1919
HMS Rodney	8 × 15-inch	12 inches	46,680 long tons (47,429 t)	4 screws, steam turbines, 31 kn (57 km/h; 36 mph)	9 October 1916	Suspended, March 1917	Cancelled, 27 February 1919
G3 battlecruiser	9 × 16-inch (406 mm)	14 inches (356 mm)	53,909 long tons (54,774 t)	4 screws, steam turbines, 31 kn (57 km/h; 36 mph)	Ordered 26 October 1921	—	Cancelled, February 1922

== Germany ==
Ship	Main guns	Armor	Displacement	Propulsion	Service		
Ship	Main guns	Armor	Displacement	Propulsion	Laid down	Commissioned	Fate
SMS Von der Tann	8 × 28 cm (11 in)	25 cm (9.8 in)	21,300 t (21,000 long tons)	4 screws, Parsons steam turbines, 27.75 knots (51 km/h)	21 March 1908	1 September 1910	Scuttled at Scapa Flow, 21 June 1919, wreck raised 1930s and scrapped at Rosyth
SMS Moltke	10 × 28 cm	28 cm	25,400 t (25,000 long tons)	4 screws, Parsons steam turbines, 28.4 kn (52.6 km/h; 32.7 mph)	7 December 1908	30 August 1911	Scuttled at Scapa Flow, 21 June 1919, wreck raised 1927 and scrapped at Rosyth
SMS Goeben	10 × 28 cm	28 cm	25,400 t (25,000 long tons)	4 screws, Parsons steam turbines, 28 kn (52 km/h; 32 mph)	28 August 1909	2 July 1912	Transferred to the Ottoman Empire on 16 August 1914, scrapped, 1973
SMS Seydlitz	10 × 28 cm	30.5 cm	28,550 t (28,100 long tons)	4 screws, Parsons steam turbines, 28.1 knots (51 km/h)	4 February 1911	22 May 1913	Scuttled at Scapa Flow, 21 June 1919, wreck raised 1928 and scrapped at Rosyth
SMS Derfflinger	8 × 30.5 cm (12.0 in)	30.5 cm	31,200 t (30,700 long tons)	4 screws, Parsons steam turbines, 25.5 kn (47.2 km/h; 29.3 mph)	30 March 1912	1 September 1914	Scuttled in Scapa Flow, 21 June 1919, wreck raised 1939, broken up after 1946
SMS Lützow	8 × 30.5 cm (12.0 in)	30.5 cm	31,200 t (30,700 long tons)	4 screws, Parsons steam turbines, 26.4 kn (48.9 km/h; 30.4 mph)	May 1912	8 August 1915	Scuttled after severe damage at the Battle of Jutland, 1 June 1916
SMS Hindenburg	8 × 30.5 cm (12.0 in)	30.5 cm	31,500 t (31,000 long tons)	4 screws, Parsons steam turbines, 26.6 kn (49.3 km/h; 30.6 mph)	1 October 1913	10 May 1917	Scuttled in Scapa Flow, 21 June 1919, wreck raised 1930, scrapped 1930–1932
SMS Mackensen	8 × 35 cm (13.8 in)	30.5 cm	35,300 t (34,700 long tons)	4 screws, Parsons steam turbines, 28 kn (52 km/h; 32 mph)	1914	—	Struck, 17 November 1919, broken up, 1922
SMS Graf Spee	8 × 35 cm (13.8 in)	30.5 cm	35,300 t (34,700 long tons)	4 screws, Parsons steam turbines, 28 kn (52 km/h; 32 mph)	1915	—	Struck, 17 November 1919, broken up, 1921–22
SMS Prinz Eitel Friedrich	8 × 35 cm (13.8 in)	30.5 cm	35,300 t (34,700 long tons)	4 screws, Parsons steam turbines, 28 kn (52 km/h; 32 mph)	1915	—	Broken up, 1921
SMS Fürst Bismarck	8 × 35 cm (13.8 in)	30.5 cm	35,300 t (34,700 long tons)	4 screws, Parsons steam turbines, 28 kn (52 km/h; 32 mph)	1915	—	Struck, 17 November 1919, broken up, 1922
Ersatz Yorck	8 × 38 cm (15 in)	30.5 cm	38,000 t (37,400 long tons)	4 screws, Parsons steam turbines, 27.3 kn (50.6 km/h; 31.4 mph)	1916	—	Scrapped 26 months before completion
Ersatz Gneisenau	8 × 38 cm (15 in)	30.5 cm	38,000 t (37,400 long tons)	4 screws, Parsons steam turbines, 27.3 kn (50.6 km/h; 31.4 mph)	1916	—	Scrapped 26 months before completion
Ersatz Scharnhorst	8 × 38 cm (15 in)	30.5 cm	38,000 t (37,400 long tons)	4 screws, Parsons steam turbines, 27.3 kn (50.6 km/h; 31.4 mph)	Scrapped 26 months before completion	—	_
O	6 × 38.1 cm (15.0 in)	19 cm (7.5 in)	35,400 long tons (36,000 t) (Note: Figures here are reversed intentionally; following the signing of the Washington Naval Treaty in 1922, the use of long tons to calculate ship displacement was standardized.)	3 screws, 8 × 24 cylinder diesel engines, 1 steam turbine, 35 kn (65 km/h; 40 mph)	—		Canceled after the outbreak of World War II
P	6 × 38.1 cm (15.0 in)	19 cm (7.5 in)	35,400 long tons (36,000 t)	3 screws, 8 × 24 cylinder diesel engines, 1 steam turbine, 35 kn (65 km/h; 40 mph)	—		Canceled after the outbreak of World War II
Q	6 × 38.1 cm (15.0 in)	19 cm (7.5 in)	35,400 long tons (36,000 t)	3 screws, 8 × 24 cylinder diesel engines, 1 steam turbine, 35 kn (65 km/h; 40 mph)	—		Canceled after the outbreak of World War II

== Japan ==
Ship	Main guns	Armor	Displacement	Propulsion	Service		
Ship	Main guns	Armor	Displacement	Propulsion	Laid down	Commissioned	Fate
Kongō	8 × 14.0 in (356 mm)	8.0 in (200 mm)	27,500 long tons (27,941 t)	4 screws, steam turbines, 27.5 kn (50.9 km/h; 31.6 mph) (later 30.5 kn (56.5 km/h; 35.1 mph))	17 January 1911	16 August 1913	Torpedoed in Formosa Strait, 21 November 1944
Hiei	8 × 14.0 in (356 mm)	8.0 in (200 mm)	27,500 long tons (27,941 t)	4 screws, steam turbines, 27.5 kn (50.9 km/h; 31.6 mph) (later 30.5 kn (56.5 km/h; 35.1 mph))	4 November 1911	4 August 1914	Scuttled following Naval Battle of Guadalcanal, 13 November 1942
Kirishima	8 × 14.0 in (356 mm)	8.0 in (200 mm)	27,500 long tons (27,941 t)	4 screws, steam turbines, 27.5 kn (50.9 km/h; 31.6 mph) (later 30.5 kn (56.5 km/h; 35.1 mph))	17 March 1912	19 April 1915	Sank following Naval Battle of Guadalcanal, 15 November 1942
Haruna	8 × 14.0 in (356 mm)	8.0 in (200 mm)	27,500 long tons (27,941 t)	4 screws, steam turbines, 27.5 kn (50.9 km/h; 31.6 mph) (later 30.5 kn (56.5 km/h; 35.1 mph))	16 March 1912	19 April 1915	Sunk by air attack, Kure Naval Base, 28 July 1945
Amagi	10 × 16.1 in (409 mm)	10.0 in (250 mm)	46,000 long tons (46,738 t)	4 screws, steam turbines, 30 kn (56 km/h; 35 mph)	16 December 1920	—	Reordered as aircraft carrier; damaged in earthquake; canceled and scrapped
Akagi	10 × 16.1 in (409 mm)	10.0 in (250 mm)	46,000 long tons (46,738 t)	4 screws, steam turbines, 30 kn (56 km/h; 35 mph)	6 December 1920	December 1923	Reordered and completed as aircraft carrier Scuttled at Midway
Atago	10 × 16.1 in (409 mm)	10.0 in (250 mm)	46,000 long tons (46,738 t)	4 screws, steam turbines, 30 kn (56 km/h; 35 mph)	22 November 1921	—	Canceled and scrapped
Takao	10 × 16.1 in (409 mm)	10.0 in (250 mm)	46,000 long tons (46,738 t)	4 screws, steam turbines, 30 kn (56 km/h; 35 mph)	19 December 1921	—	Canceled and scrapped
Yard number 795 (not named) (Note: As the ships were only in the design phase when canceled—no orders were placed and no construction had begun—the B-65s were never assigned actual names.)	9 × 12.2 in (310 mm)	7.5 in (190 mm)	34,000 long tons (35,000 t)	4 screws, geared turbines, eight boilers, 34 kn (63 km/h; 39 mph)	—	1945 (projected)	Not ordered due to war
Yard number 796 (not named)	9 × 12.2 in (310 mm)	7.5 in (190 mm)	34,000 long tons (35,000 t)	4 screws, geared turbines, eight boilers, 34 kn (63 km/h; 39 mph)	—	1946 (projected)	Not ordered due to war

== Russia/Soviet Union ==
Ship	Main guns	Armor	Displacement	Propulsion	Service		
Ship	Main guns	Armor	Displacement	Propulsion	Laid down	Launched	Fate
Izmail (Russian: Измаил)	8 × 14 in	237.5 mm (9.4 in)	36,646 long tons (37,234 t)	4 screws, steam turbines, 26.5 kn (49.1 km/h; 30.5 mph)	19 December 1912	22 June 1915	Scrapped, 1931
Borodino (Russian: Бородино)	8 × 14 in	237.5 mm (9.4 in)	36,646 long tons (37,234 t)	4 screws, steam turbines, 26.5 kn (49.1 km/h; 30.5 mph)	19 December 1912	31 July 1915	Sold for scrap, 21 August 1923
Kinburn (Russian: Кинбурн)	8 × 14 in	237.5 mm (9.4 in)	36,646 long tons (37,234 t)	4 screws, steam turbines, 26.5 kn (49.1 km/h; 30.5 mph)	19 December 1912	30 October 1915	Sold for scrap, 21 August 1923
Navarin (Russian: Наварин)	8 × 14 in	237.5 mm (9.4 in)	36,646 long tons (37,234 t)	4 screws, steam turbines, 26.5 kn (49.1 km/h; 30.5 mph)	19 December 1912	9 November 1916	Sold for scrap, 21 August 1923
Kronshtadt (Russian: Кронштадт)	6 × 38 cm	230 mm (9.1 in)	42,831 t (42,155 long tons)	3 screws, steam turbines, 32 kn (59 km/h; 37 mph)	30 November 1939	—	Ordered scrapped, 24 March 1947
Sevastopol (Russian: Севастополь)	6 × 38 cm	230 mm (9.1 in)	42,831 t (42,155 long tons)	3 screws, steam turbines, 32 kn (59 km/h; 37 mph)	5 November 1939	—	Ordered scrapped, 24 March 1947
Stalingrad (Russian: Сталинград)	9 × 30.5 cm	180 mm (7.1 in)	42,300 t (41,632 long tons)	4 screws, steam turbines, 35.5 kn (65.7 km/h; 40.9 mph)	November 1951	16 March 1954	Hulk used as target and later scrapped
Moscow (Russian: Москва)	9 × 30.5 cm	180 mm (7.1 in)	42,300 t (41,632 long tons)	4 screws, steam turbines, 35.5 kn (65.7 km/h; 40.9 mph)	September, 1952	—	Scrapped, 1953
Kronshtadt? (Russian: Кронштадт)	9 × 30.5 cm	180 mm (7.1 in)	42,300 t (41,632 long tons)	4 screws, steam turbines, 35.5 kn (65.7 km/h; 40.9 mph)	October 1952	—	Scrapped, 1953
Ship	Main armament		Displacement	Propulsion	Service		
Ship	Anti-ship missiles	Guns	Displacement	Propulsion	Laid down	Commissioned	Fate
Admiral Ushakov (Russian: Адмирал Ушаков)	20 x P-700 Granit	2 x AK-100 100 mm (3.9 in)	28,000 t (27,558 long tons)	2 shaft CONAS; 2 x KN-3 nuclear reactor and 2 x GT3A-688 steam turbine, 32 kn (59 km/h; 37 mph)	27 March 1974	30 December 1980	Laid up
Admiral Lazarev (Russian: Адмирал Лазарев)	20 x P-700 Granit	1 x twin AK-130 130 mm (5.1 in)	28,000 t (27,558 long tons)	2 shaft CONAS; 2 x KN-3 nuclear reactor and 2 x GT3A-688 steam turbine, 32 kn (59 km/h; 37 mph)	27 July 1978	31 October 1984	Laid up
Admiral Nakhimov (Russian: Адмирал Нахимов)	20 x P-700 Granit	1 x twin AK-130 130 mm (5.1 in)	28,000 t (27,558 long tons)	2 shaft CONAS; 2 x KN-3 nuclear reactor and 2 x GT3A-688 steam turbine, 32 kn (59 km/h; 37 mph)	17 May 1983	30 December 1988	In refit
Pyotr Velikiy (Russian: Пётр Великий)	20 x P-700 Granit	1 x twin AK-130 130 mm (5.1 in)	28,000 t (27,558 long tons)	2 shaft CONAS; 2 x KN-3 nuclear reactor and 2 x GT3A-688 steam turbine, 32 kn (59 km/h; 37 mph)	11 March 1986	9 April 1998	Active in service
Admiral Kuznetsov (Russian: Адмирал Кузнецо́в)	20 x P-700 Granit	1 x twin AK-130 130 mm (5.1 in)	28,000 t (27,558 long tons)	2 shaft CONAS; 2 x KN-3 nuclear reactor and 2 x GT3A-688 steam turbine, 32 kn (59 km/h; 37 mph)	Cancelled 3 October 1990		

== United States ==
Ship	Main guns	Armor	Displacement	Propulsion	Service			
Ship	Main guns	Armor	Displacement	Propulsion	Laid down	Launched	Commissioned	Fate
USS Lexington (CV-2, ex-CC-1)	8 × 16 in	7 in (178 mm)	44,638 long tons (45,354 t)	4 screws, turbo-electric, 33 kn (61 km/h; 38 mph)	8 January 1921	3 October 1925	14 December 1927	Sunk during the Battle of the Coral Sea, 8 May 1942
USS Constellation (CC-2)	8 × 16 in	7 in (178 mm)	44,638 long tons (45,354 t)	4 screws, turbo-electric, 33 kn (61 km/h; 38 mph)	8 August 1920	Cancelled, 17 August 1923 and sold for scrap		
USS Saratoga (CV-3, ex-CC-3)	8 × 16 in	7 in (178 mm)	44,638 long tons (45,354 t)	4 screws, turbo-electric, 33 kn (61 km/h; 38 mph)	25 September 1920	7 April 1925	16 November 1927	Sunk as a target ship, 25 July 1946
USS Ranger (CC-4)	8 × 16 in	7 in (178 mm)	44,638 long tons (45,354 t)	4 screws, turbo-electric, 33 kn (61 km/h; 38 mph)	23 June 1921	Cancelled, 17 August 1923 and sold for scrap, November 1923		
USS Constitution (CC-5)	8 × 16 in	7 in (178 mm)	44,638 long tons (45,354 t)	4 screws, turbo-electric, 33 kn (61 km/h; 38 mph)	25 September 1920	Cancelled, 17 August 1923 and sold for scrap, November 1923		
USS United States (CC-6)	8 × 16 in	7 in (178 mm)	44,638 long tons (45,354 t)	4 screws, turbo-electric, 33 kn (61 km/h; 38 mph)	25 September 1920	Cancelled, 17 August 1923 and sold for scrap, November 1923		
USS Alaska (CB-1)	9 × 12 in	9 in	34,253 long tons (34,803 t)	4 screws, steam turbines 33 kn (61 km/h; 38 mph)	17 December 1941	15 August 1943	17 June 1944	Sold for scrap, 30 June 1961
USS Guam (CB-2)	9 × 12 in	9 in	34,253 long tons (34,803 t)	4 screws, steam turbines 33 kn (61 km/h; 38 mph)	2 February 1942	12 November 1943	17 September 1944	Sold for scrap, 24 May 1961
USS Hawaii (CB-3)	9 × 12 in	9 in	34,253 long tons (34,803 t)	4 screws, steam turbines 33 kn (61 km/h; 38 mph)	20 December 1943	3 November 1945	N/A	Sold for scrap, 15 April 1959
USS Philippines (CB-4)	9 × 12 in	9 in	34,253 long tons (34,803 t)	4 screws, steam turbines 33 kn (61 km/h; 38 mph)	Cancelled, 24 June 1943			
USS Puerto Rico (CB-5)	9 × 12 in	9 in	34,253 long tons (34,803 t)	4 screws, steam turbines 33 kn (61 km/h; 38 mph)	Cancelled, 24 June 1943			
USS Samoa (CB-6)	9 × 12 in	9 in	34,253 long tons (34,803 t)	4 screws, steam turbines 33 kn (61 km/h; 38 mph)	Cancelled, 24 June 1943			

== Australia ==
Ship	Main guns	Armor	Displacement	Propulsion	Service		
Ship	Main guns	Armor	Displacement	Propulsion	Laid down	Commissioned	Fate
HMAS Australia	8 × 12 in	9.0 in	18,500 t (18,208 long tons)	4 screws, steam turbines, 25 kn (46 km/h; 29 mph)	23 June 1910	June 1913	Scuttled, 12 April 1924

== France ==
Ship	Main guns	Armor	Displacement	Propulsion	Service		
Ship	Main guns	Armor	Displacement	Propulsion	Laid down	Commissioned	Fate
Gille's design	12 × 340 mm (13.4 in)	11 in (280 mm)	28,247 t (27,801 long tons)	4 screws, steam turbines, 28 kn (52 km/h; 32 mph)	—		Design study only
Durand-Viel's design A	8 × 340 mm	11 in (280 mm)	27,500 t (27,066 long tons)	4 screws, steam turbines, 28 kn (52 km/h; 32 mph)	—		Design study only
Durand-Viel's design B	12 × 370 mm (14.6 in)	11 in (280 mm)	27,500 t (27,066 long tons)	4 screws, steam turbines, 28 kn (52 km/h; 32 mph)	—		Design study only

== Netherlands ==
Ship	Main guns	Armor	Displacement	Propulsion	Service		
Ship	Main guns	Armor	Displacement	Propulsion	Laid down	Commissioned	Fate
Design 1047	9 × 28 cm	9.0 in	27,988 t (27,546 long tons)	4 screws, steam turbines, 34 kn (63 km/h; 39 mph)	—		Cancelled after the German invasion in May 1940

== Austria-Hungary ==
Ship	Main guns	Armor	Displacement	Propulsion	Service		
Ship	Main guns	Armor	Displacement	Propulsion	Laid down	Commissioned	Fate
Project I	8 x 350 mm, 9 x 350 (design Ia)	225 mm (8,85 in)	34.000 t	4 screws, steam turbines, 30 kn (56 km/h; 35 mph)	—		Seven design studies, with different main armament lay outs in 1915 and 1916.
Project II	6 x 380 mm	225 mm (8,85 in)	34.000 t	4 screws, steam turbines, 30 kn (56 km/h; 35 mph)	—		A single design study in 1917.
Project IV	6 x 380 mm	225 mm (8,85 in)	36.000 t	4 screws, steam turbines, 30 kn (56 km/h; 35 mph)	—		A single design study in 1917.
Project VI	4 x 420 mm	225 mm (8,85 in)	36.000 t	4 screws, steam turbines, 30 kn (56 km/h; 35 mph)	—		A single design study in 1917.

== See also ==
- List of battleships
- List of cruisers
- List of ships of the Second World War
- List of cruisers of the Second World War
