= French battlecruiser proposals =

Plans for French Navy battlecruisers, 1911–1913

In the years before the outbreak of World War I in 1914, the French Navy considered several proposals for battlecruisers. The Navy issued specifications for a battlecruiser design to complete part of the 28 capital ships to be built by 1920. Three designs, one by P. Gille and two by Lieutenant Durand-Viel, were completed in 1913. All three designs were similar to contemporary battleship designs, specifically the Normandie class, which introduced a quadruple gun turret for the main battery, which was adopted for all three proposals. The first two called for the same 340 mm (13.4 in) gun used on all French super-dreadnoughts, though the third proposed a much more powerful 370 mm (14.6 in) gun. Though the design studies were complete, the French Navy did not authorize or begin construction of any battlecruisers before the start of the war.

== Background ==
In the Naval Law of 30 March 1912, the French Navy called for a total force of twenty capital ships to be built by 1920. The Technical Branch subsequently issued a set of somewhat vague requirements for battlecruiser designs. The requirements stipulated a displacement of 28,000 metric tons (28,000 long tons; 31,000 short tons), a speed of 27 knots (50 km/h; 31 mph), an armament of eight 340 mm (13.4 in) guns, and a crew of not more than 1,200 officers and enlisted men. These figures were very similar to the British Lion-class battlecruisers then under construction. Numerous proposals were submitted to the Technical Branch, but only two were evaluated further. The first was prepared by P. Gille, a naval engineer overseeing the construction of the Normandie-class battleship Flandre, and the second by then-Lieutenant Durand-Viel, a student at the Naval College. As the proposals were only design studies, none were authorized and no ships were built; the outbreak of World War I ensured that even more advanced projects, like the Normandie and Lyon-class battleships were canceled as resources were redirected toward more pressing needs.

== Gille's design ==
General characteristics
- Displacement: Full load: 28,247 t (27,801 long tons)
- Length: Length overall: 205 m (672 ft 7 in)
- Beam: 27 m (88 ft 7 in)
- Draft: 9.03 m (29 ft 8 in)
- Installed power: 52 × coal-fired boilers; 80,000 shp (60,000 kW)
- Propulsion: 4-shaft turbines
- Speed: 28 knots (52 km/h; 32 mph)
- Range: 6,300 nmi (11,700 km; 7,200 mi) at 15 knots (28 km/h; 17 mph)
- Crew: 41 officers; 1,258 enlisted men
- Armament: 12 × 340mm/45 Modèle 1912 guns; 24 × 138.6 mm Mle 1910 guns; 6 × torpedo tubes
- Armor: Belt: 270 mm (10.6 in); Turrets: 270 mm

In 1911, Gille went to Britain to observe the construction of the new Orion-class battleships and the Lion-class battlecruisers. The latter ships prompted Gille to decide the French Navy ought to build battlecruisers as well, since Britain and Germany had already begun acquiring them, and they would prove useful as a fast division of the French fleet. Gille decided that his proposed ship would need a top speed of 28 to 29 knots (52 to 54 km/h; 32 to 33 mph) to retain an advantage over foreign battleships, the latest of which had estimated speeds of 22 to 23 knots (41 to 43 km/h; 25 to 26 mph). They would also need enough armor and a main battery powerful enough to fight in the line of battle. The limitations that weight imposed on the design, however, restricted the amount of armor possible, and so the traditional French practice of a complete armor belt that covered the entire side of the ship would be impossible; an armored citadel layout would be necessary.

=== Characteristics ===
Illustration of the Normandie design; Gille's design was very similar to these ships, but with the center turret moved further aft to free up space for the larger propulsion system

Gille's battlecruiser design called for a displacement of 28,247 t (27,801 long tons; 31,137 short tons) on a hull that was 205 meters (673 ft) long between perpendiculars, with a beam of 27 m (88 ft 7 in) at the waterline and an average draft of 9.03 m (29 ft 8 in). The freeboard forward was 7.15 m (23 ft 5 in), and aft was 4.65 m (15.3 ft). The hull lines of the ships proved to be highly efficient in tank tests during the design process. Due to the extreme weight of the gun turrets for the main battery at the bow and stern, the hull had to be strengthened to handle the strain. Very strong longitudinal bracing was incorporated, and the inner and outer skins of the hull was thickened to reinforce the bracings. The ships' expected metacentric height was 1.03 m (3 ft 5 in), comparable to the British Lion class. Each ship would be crewed by 41 officers and 1,258 enlisted men.

The ships would have been equipped with four sets of steam turbines rated at 80,000 shaft horsepower (60,000 kW) powered by fifty-two coal-fired Belleville boilers. Each propeller shaft was connected to a high-pressure turbine, a medium-pressure geared turbine, and a low-pressure turbine for forward steaming, and a direct drive turbine for steaming in reverse. The ships' top speed was to have been 28 knots. The ships would have been supplied with 2,833 t (2,788 long tons; 3,123 short tons) of coal and 630 t (620 long tons; 690 short tons) of fuel oil for supplementary oil firing. At maximum speed, the ships could have cruised for 1,660 nautical miles (3,070 km; 1,910 mi); at 20.3 knots (37.6 km/h; 23.4 mph), the range increased to 4,240 nmi (7,850 km; 4,880 mi), an at a more economical 15 knots (28 km/h; 17 mph), the range grew to 6,300 nmi (11,700 km; 7,200 mi).

The ships' main armament was composed of twelve 340mm/45 Modèle 1912 guns in three quadruple turrets, the same as in the contemporary French battleships of the Normandie class. One turret was placed forward, and the other two were placed in a superfiring pair, all on the centerline. The guns had a range of 16,000 m (17,000 yd) and had a rate of fire of two rounds per minute. The shells were 540-kilogram (1,190 lb) armor-piercing rounds and were fired with a muzzle velocity of 800 meters per second (2,600 ft/s). A secondary battery of twenty-four 138.6 mm /55 Modèle 1910 guns mounted in casemates was planned for defense against torpedo boats. These guns fired a 36.5 kg (80 lb) shell at a muzzle velocity of 830 m/s (2,700 ft/s). The armament was rounded out by six torpedo tubes of undetermined diameter, all submerged in the ships' hulls.

The ships' sides would have been protected by an armor belt that was 270 mm (10.6 in) thick amidships. Horizontal protection consisted of an armor deck that was 20 mm (0.79 in) thick; it sloped downward at the sides of the hull and connected to the bottom of the armor belt. The sloped sides were 50 mm (2.0 in) thick. Underwater protection consisted of a 20 mm thick torpedo bulkhead. The main battery turrets received 270 mm of armor plate on their faces, while the secondary battery casemates had 180 mm (7.1 in) of armor on their exposed sides.

== Durand-Viel's designs ==
General characteristics "A"
- Displacement: Full load: 27,500 t (27,100 long tons)
- Length: 210 m (689 ft 0 in)
- Beam: 27 m (88 ft 7 in)
- Draft: 8.7 m (28 ft 7 in)
- Installed power: 24 mix-fired boilers; 74,000 shp (55,000 kW)
- Propulsion: 4-shaft turbines
- Speed: 27 kn (50 km/h; 31 mph)
- Range: 3,500 nmi (6,500 km; 4,000 mi) at 15 knots (28 km/h; 17 mph)
- Armament: 8 × 340mm/45 Modèle 1912 guns; 24 × 138.6 mm Mle 1910 guns; 4 × 450 mm (17.7 in) torpedo tubes
- Armor: Belt: 270 mm

General characteristics "B"
- Displacement: Full load: 27,500 t (27,100 long tons)
- Length: 208 m (682 ft 5 in)
- Beam: 27 m (88 ft 7 in)
- Draft: 8.7 m (28 ft 7 in)
- Installed power: 18 mix-fired boilers; 63,000 to 80,000 shp (47,000 to 60,000 kW)
- Propulsion: 4-shaft turbines
- Speed: 26 to 27 kn (48 to 50 km/h; 30 to 31 mph)
- Range: 3,500 nmi (6,500 km; 4,000 mi) at 15 kn (28 km/h; 17 mph)
- Armament: 8 × 370 mm (14.6 in) guns; 28 × 138.6 mm guns; 4 × 450 mm (17.7 in) torpedo tubes

In 1913, the Naval College had several of its students submit design studies for a fast capital ship. The class was given a displacement of 27,500 t (27,100 long tons; 30,300 short tons) as a limit on size; all of the officers opted to design either fast or slow battleships, with the exception of Lieutenant Durand-Viel, who chose instead to create a design for a battlecruiser. Durand-Viel drew up a pair of designs, which were evaluated by the General Staff in June 1914. He saw his ships forming a fast division of the battle fleet capable of encircling an enemy squadron; as with Gille's design, this required heavy armament and armor to permit the ships to engage battleships.

=== Project "A" characteristics ===
Durand-Viel's first battlecruiser design, "A", was built on a displacement of 27,500 t (27,100 long tons; 30,300 short tons). The hull was 210 meters (690 ft) long at the waterline, with a beam of 27 m (89 ft) at the waterline and an average draft of 8.7 m (29 ft). The ships would have been equipped with four sets of direct drive turbines rated at 74,000 shaft horsepower (55,000 kW) powered by twenty-four double-ended Belleville boilers that burned both coal and oil. The ships' top speed was to have been 27 knots (50 km/h; 31 mph). The ships would have been supplied with 1,810 t (1,780 long tons; 2,000 short tons) of coal and 1,050 t (1,030 long tons; 1,160 short tons) of fuel oil . The ships could have cruised for 3,500 nautical miles (6,500 km; 4,000 mi) at 16 kn (30 km/h; 18 mph), with enough fuel for an additional six hours for combat speeds.

The ships' main armament was composed of eight 340mm/45 Modèle 1912 guns in two quadruple turrets, identical to those intended for the Normandie class. Both turrets were placed on the centerline, on either end of the ship. A secondary battery of twenty-four 138.6 mm Modèle 1910 guns mounted in casemates was planned for defense against torpedo boats. Four 47 mm (1.9 in) saluting guns were also to be equipped. The armament was rounded out by four 450 mm (17.7 in) torpedo tubes, all submerged in the ships' hulls. The main armor belt was 280 mm (11 in) thick amidships, slightly thinner than the belt on the Normandie-class battleships. The rest of the ship's armor was very similar to that of the Normandie class.

=== Project "B" characteristics ===
Durand-Viel's second battlecruiser design, "B", was built on the same displacement as the first design. The heavier weight of the increased main battery was offset by a reduction in the armor protection for the secondary guns and improved performance of the ship's propulsion system. The hull was 208 meters (682 ft) long at the waterline, with a beam of 27 m at the waterline and an average draft of 8.7 m. Two engine systems were considered: four direct drive turbines rated at 63,000 shp (47,000 kW) or four geared turbines rated at 80,000 shp (60,000 kW). Steam was provided by eighteen Belleville boilers, ten of which that burned both coal and oil, and eight that were oil-fired only. The ships' top speed was to have been 26 knots (48 km/h; 30 mph) for the first variant and 27 knots for the second. The ships would have been supplied with the same fuel allotment as the "A" design, with the same radius of action as well.

The ships' main armament was composed of eight 370 mm (14.6 in) guns in two quadruple turrets. Both turrets were placed on the centerline, on either end of the ship. The gun fired a 880-kilogram (1,940 lb) shell that was capable of penetrating 300 mm (11.8 in) of armor plate at a range of 12,700 m (13,900 yd). A secondary battery for defense against torpedo boats consisted of twenty-eight 138.6 mm guns, of a new semi-automatic design, mounted in casemates. Four 47 mm saluting guns were also to be installed. The should would also to have carried four 450 mm torpedo tubes, all submerged in the ships' hulls. The ships' armor system was identical to the "A" design.
