= Battlecruiser =

Large capital warship

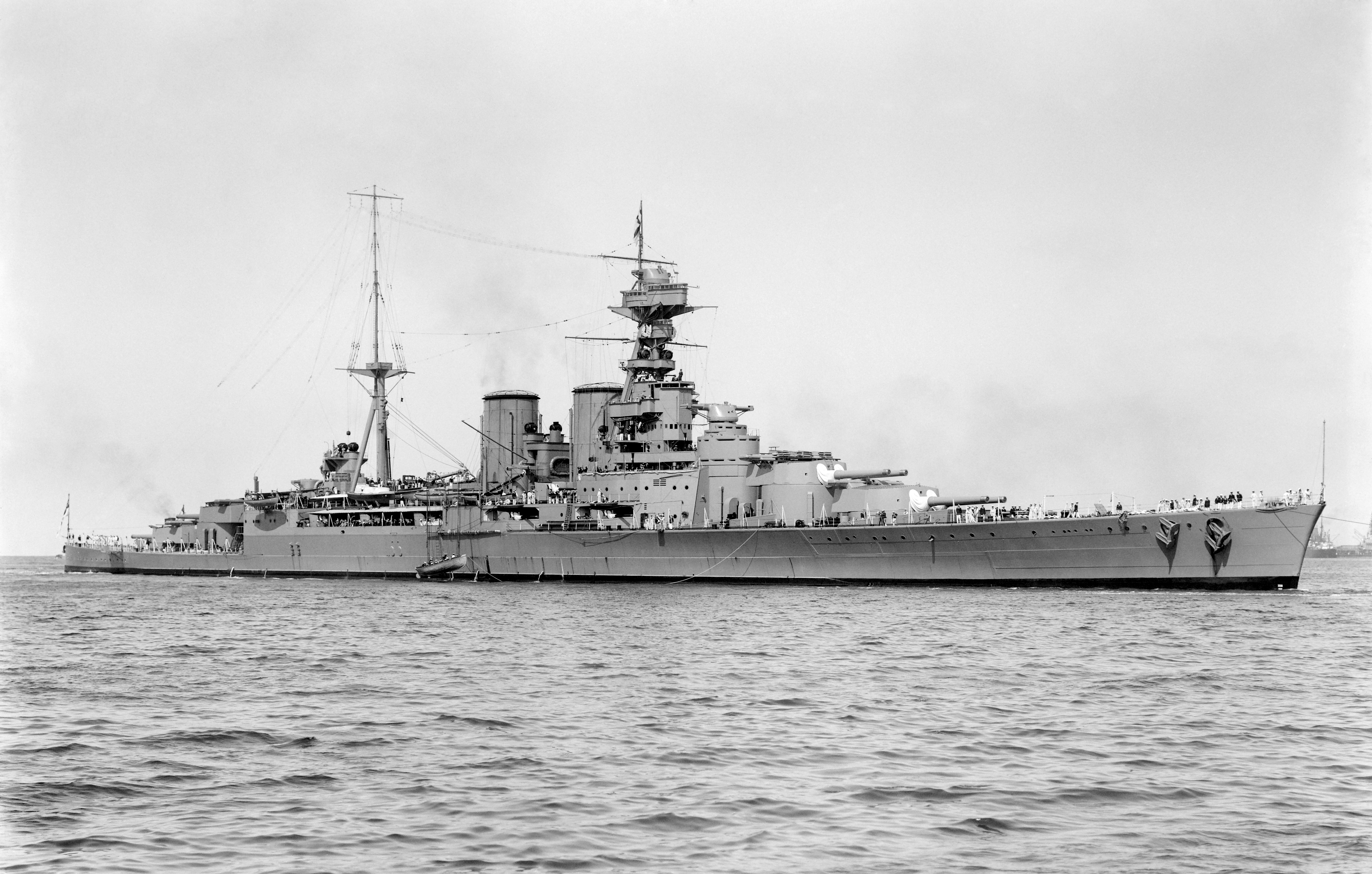
HMS Hood, the largest battlecruiser ever built, in Australia on 17 March 1924

The battlecruiser (also written as battle cruiser or battle-cruiser) was a type of capital ship of the first half of the 20th century. These were similar in displacement, armament and cost to battleships, but differed in form and balance of attributes. Battlecruisers typically had thinner armour (to a varying degree) and a somewhat lighter main gun battery than contemporary battleships, installed on a longer hull with much higher engine power in order to attain greater speeds. The first battlecruisers were designed in the United Kingdom as a successor to the armoured cruiser, at the same time as the dreadnought succeeded the pre-dreadnought battleship. The goal of the battlecruiser concept was to outrun any ship with similar armament, and chase down any ship with lesser armament; they were intended to hunt down slower, older armoured cruisers and destroy them with heavy gunfire while avoiding combat with the more powerful but slower battleships. However, as more and more battlecruisers were built, they were increasingly used alongside the better-protected battleships.

Battlecruisers served in the navies of the United Kingdom, Germany, the Ottoman Empire, Australia and Japan during World War I, most notably at the Battle of the Falkland Islands and in the several raids and skirmishes in the North Sea which culminated in a pitched fleet battle, the Battle of Jutland. British battlecruisers in particular suffered heavy losses at Jutland, where poor fire safety and ammunition handling practices left them vulnerable to catastrophic magazine explosions following hits to their main turrets from large-calibre shells. This dismal showing led to a persistent general belief that battlecruisers were too thinly armoured to function successfully. By the end of the war, capital ship design had developed, with battleships becoming faster and battlecruisers becoming more heavily armoured, blurring the distinction between a battlecruiser and a fast battleship. The Washington Naval Treaty, which limited capital ship construction from 1922 onwards, treated battleships and battlecruisers identically, and the new generation of battlecruisers planned by the United States, Great Britain and Japan were scrapped or converted into aircraft carriers under the terms of the treaty.

Improvements in armour design and propulsion created the 1930s "fast battleship" with the speed of a battlecruiser and armour of a battleship, making the battlecruiser in the traditional sense effectively an obsolete concept. Thus from the 1930s on, only the Royal Navy continued to use "battlecruiser" as a classification for the World War I–era capital ships that remained in the fleet; while Japan's battlecruisers remained in service, they had been significantly reconstructed and were re-rated as full-fledged fast battleships. Some new vessels built during that decade, the German Scharnhorst-class battleships and Deutschland-class cruisers and the French Dunkerque-class battleships are all sometimes referred to as battlecruisers, although the owning navies referred to them as "battleships" (German: Schlachtschiffe), "armoured ships" (German: Panzerschiffe) and "battleships" (French: Bâtiments de ligne) respectively. (Note: The German Scharnhorst-class battleships and Deutschland-class cruisers and the French Dunkerque-class battleships are all sometimes referred to as battlecruisers, although the owning navies referred to them as "battleships" (German: Schlachtschiffe), "armoured ships" (German: Panzerschiffe) and "battleships" (French: Bâtiments de ligne) respectively. Since neither their operators nor a significant number of naval historians classify them as such, they are not discussed in this article.)

Battlecruisers were put into action again during World War II, and only one survived to the end, Renown. There was also renewed interest in large "cruiser-killer" type warships whose design was scaled-up from a heavy cruiser rather than a lighter/faster battleship derivative, but few were ever begun and only two members of the Alaska-class were commissioned in time to see war service. Construction of large cruisers as well as fast battleships were curtailed in favor of more-needed aircraft carriers, convoy escorts, and cargo ships.

During (and after) the Cold War, the Soviet Kirov class of large guided missile cruisers have been the only ships termed "battlecruisers"; the class is also the only example of a nuclear-powered battlecruiser. As of 2024, Russia operates two units: the Pyotr Velikiy has remained in active service since its 1998 commissioning, while the Admiral Nakhimov has been inactive (in storage or refitting) since 1999.

== Background ==
The battlecruiser was developed by the Royal Navy in the first years of the 20th century as an evolution of the armoured cruiser. The first armoured cruisers had been built in the 1870s, as an attempt to give armour protection to ships fulfilling the typical cruiser roles of patrol, trade protection and power projection. However, the results were rarely satisfactory, as the weight of armour required for any meaningful protection usually meant that the ship became almost as slow as a battleship. As a result, navies preferred to build protected cruisers with an armoured deck protecting their engines, or simply no armour at all.

In the 1890s, new Krupp steel armour meant that it was now possible to give a cruiser side armour which would protect it against the quick-firing guns of enemy battleships and cruisers alike. In 1896–97 France and Russia, who were regarded as likely allies in the event of war, started to build large, fast armoured cruisers taking advantage of this. In the event of a war between Britain and France or Russia, or both, these cruisers threatened to cause serious difficulties for the British Empire's worldwide trade.

Britain, which had concluded in 1892 that it needed twice as many cruisers as any potential enemy to adequately protect its empire's sea lanes, responded to the perceived threat by laying down its own large armoured cruisers. Between 1899 and 1905, it completed or laid down seven classes of this type, a total of 35 ships. This building program, in turn, prompted the French and Russians to increase their own construction. The Imperial German Navy began to build large armoured cruisers for use on their overseas stations, laying down eight between 1897 and 1906. In the period 1889–1896, the Royal Navy spent £7.3 million on new large cruisers. From 1897 to 1904, it spent £26.9 million. Many armoured cruisers of the new kind were just as large and expensive as the equivalent battleship.

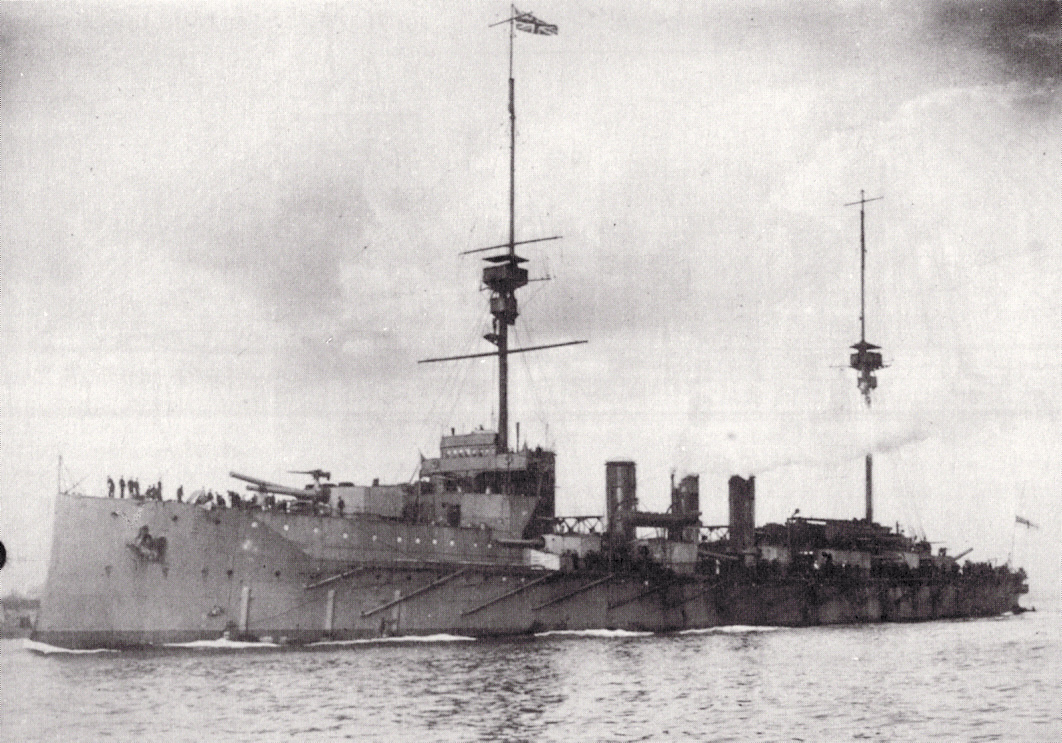
HMS Shannon, a Minotaur-class armoured cruiser

The increasing size and power of the armoured cruiser led to suggestions in British naval circles that cruisers should displace battleships entirely. The battleship's main advantage was its 12-inch heavy guns, and heavier armour designed to protect from shells of similar size. However, for a few years after 1900 it seemed that those advantages were of little practical value. The torpedo now had a range of 2,000 yards, and it seemed unlikely that a battleship would engage within torpedo range. However, at ranges of more than 2,000 yards it became increasingly unlikely that the heavy guns of a battleship would score any hits, as the heavy guns relied on primitive aiming techniques. The secondary batteries of 6-inch quick-firing guns, firing more plentiful shells, were more likely to hit the enemy. As naval expert Fred T. Jane wrote in June 1902,

Is there anything outside of 2,000 yards that the big gun in its hundreds of tons of medieval castle can affect, that its weight in 6-inch guns without the castle could not affect equally well? And inside 2,000, what, in these days of gyros, is there that the torpedo cannot effect with far more certainty?

In 1904, Admiral John "Jacky" Fisher became First Sea Lord, the senior officer of the Royal Navy. He had for some time thought about the development of a new fast armoured ship. He was very fond of the "second-class battleship" Renown, a faster, more lightly armoured battleship. As early as 1901, there is confusion in Fisher's writing about whether he saw the battleship or the cruiser as the model for future developments. This did not stop him from commissioning designs from naval architect W. H. Gard for an armoured cruiser with the heaviest possible armament for use with the fleet. The design Gard submitted was for a ship between 14,000–15,000 long tons (14,000–15,000 t), capable of 25 knots (46 km/h; 29 mph), armed with four 9.2-inch and twelve 7.5-inch (190 mm) guns in twin gun turrets and protected with six inches of armour along her belt and 9.2-inch turrets, 4 inches (102 mm) on her 7.5-inch turrets, 10 inches on her conning tower and up to 2.5 inches (64 mm) on her decks. However, mainstream British naval thinking between 1902 and 1904 was clearly in favour of heavily armoured battleships, rather than the fast ships that Fisher favoured.

The Battle of Tsushima proved the effectiveness of heavy guns over intermediate ones and the need for a uniform main caliber on a ship for fire control. Even before this, the Royal Navy had begun to consider a shift away from the mixed-calibre armament of the 1890s pre-dreadnought to an "all-big-gun" design, and preliminary designs circulated for battleships with all 12-inch or all 10-inch guns and armoured cruisers with all 9.2-inch guns. In late 1904, not long after the Royal Navy had decided to use 12-inch guns for its next generation of battleships because of their superior performance at long range, Fisher began to argue that big-gun cruisers could replace battleships altogether. The continuing improvement of the torpedo meant that submarines and destroyers would be able to destroy battleships; this in Fisher's view heralded the end of the battleship or at least compromised the validity of heavy armour protection. Nevertheless, armoured cruisers would remain vital for commerce protection.

Of what use is a battle fleet to a country called (A) at war with a country called (B) possessing no battleships, but having fast armoured cruisers and clouds of fast torpedo craft? What damage would (A's) battleships do to (B)? Would (B) wish for a few battleships or for more armoured cruisers? Would not (A) willingly exchange a few battleships for more fast armoured cruisers? In such a case, neither side wanting battleships is presumptive evidence that they are not of much value.

— Fisher to Lord Selborne (First Lord of the Admiralty), 20 October 1904

Fisher's views were very controversial within the Royal Navy, and even given his position as First Sea Lord, he was not in a position to insist on his own approach. Thus he assembled a "Committee on Designs", consisting of a mixture of civilian and naval experts, to determine the approach to both battleship and armoured cruiser construction in the future. While the stated purpose of the committee was to investigate and report on future requirements of ships, Fisher and his associates had already made key decisions. The terms of reference for the committee were for a battleship capable of 21 knots (39 km/h; 24 mph) with 12-inch guns and no intermediate calibres, capable of docking in existing drydocks; and a cruiser capable of 25.5 knots (47.2 km/h; 29.3 mph), also with 12-inch guns and no intermediate armament, armoured like Minotaur, the most recent armoured cruiser, and also capable of using existing docks.

== First battlecruisers ==
Under the Selborne plan of 1903, the Royal Navy intended to start three new battleships and four armoured cruisers each year. However, in late 1904 it became clear that the 1905–1906 programme would have to be considerably smaller, because of lower than expected tax revenue and the need to buy out two Chilean battleships under construction in British yards, lest they be purchased by the Russians for use against the Japanese, Britain's ally. These economic realities meant that the 1905–1906 programme consisted only of one battleship, but three armoured cruisers. The battleship became the revolutionary battleship Dreadnought, and the cruisers became the three ships of the Invincible class. Fisher later claimed, however, that he had argued during the committee for the cancellation of the remaining battleship.

The construction of the new class was begun in 1906 and completed in 1908, delayed perhaps to allow their designers to learn from any problems with Dreadnought. The ships fulfilled the design requirement quite closely. On a displacement similar to Dreadnought, the Invincibles were 40 feet (12.2 m) longer to accommodate additional boilers and more powerful turbines to propel them at 25 knots (46 km/h; 29 mph). Moreover, the new ships could maintain this speed for days, whereas pre-dreadnought battleships could not generally do so for more than an hour. Armed with eight 12-inch Mk X guns, compared to ten on Dreadnought, they had 6–7 inches (152–178 mm) of armour protecting the hull and the gun turrets. (Dreadnought's armour, by comparison, was 11–12 inches (279–305 mm) at its thickest.) The class had a very marked increase in speed, displacement and firepower compared to the most recent armoured cruisers but no more armour.

While the Invincibles were to fill the same role as the armoured cruisers they succeeded, they were expected to do so more effectively. Specifically their roles were:

- Heavy reconnaissance. Because of their power, the Invincibles could sweep away the screen of enemy cruisers to close with and observe an enemy battlefleet before using their superior speed to retire.
- Close support for the battle fleet. They could be stationed at the ends of the battle line to stop enemy cruisers harassing the battleships, and to harass the enemy's battleships if they were busy fighting battleships. Also, the Invincibles could operate as the fast wing of the battlefleet and try to outmanoeuvre the enemy.
- Pursuit. If an enemy fleet ran, then the Invincibles would use their speed to pursue, and their guns to damage or slow enemy ships.
- Commerce protection. The new ships would hunt down enemy cruisers and commerce raiders.

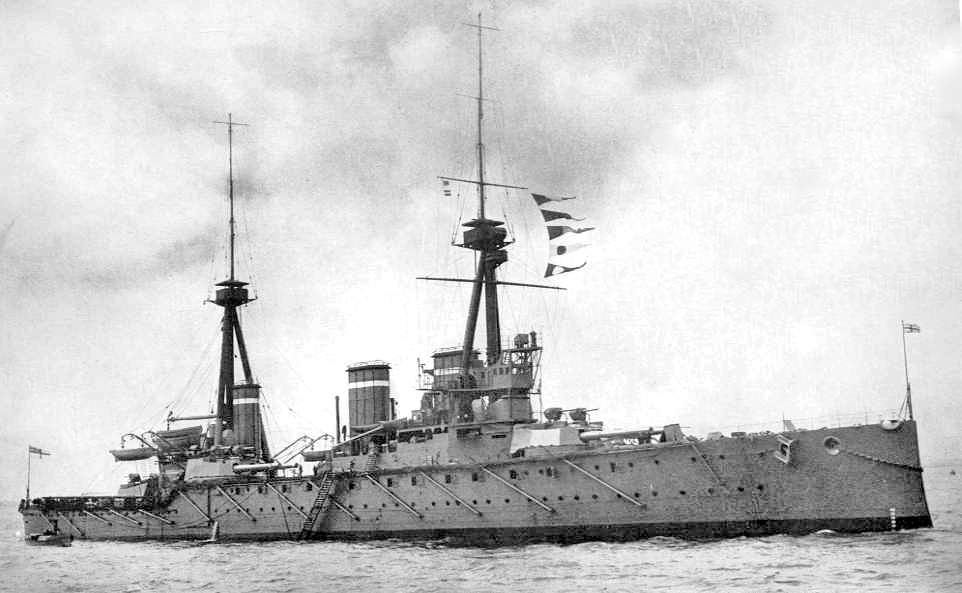
Invincible, Britain's first battlecruiser

Confusion about how to refer to these new battleship-size armoured cruisers set in almost immediately. Even in late 1905, before work was begun on the Invincibles, a Royal Navy memorandum refers to "large armoured ships" meaning both battleships and large cruisers. In October 1906, the Admiralty began to classify all post-Dreadnought battleships and armoured cruisers as "capital ships", while Fisher used the term "dreadnought" to refer either to his new battleships or the battleships and armoured cruisers together. At the same time, the Invincible class themselves were referred to as "cruiser-battleships", "dreadnought cruisers"; the term "battlecruiser" was first used by Fisher in 1908. Finally, on 24 November 1911, Admiralty Weekly Order No. 351 laid down that "All cruisers of the "Invincible" and later types are for the future to be described and classified as "battle cruisers" to distinguish them from the armoured cruisers of earlier date."

Along with questions over the new ships' nomenclature came uncertainty about their actual role due to their lack of protection. If they were primarily to act as scouts for the battle fleet and hunter-killers of enemy cruisers and commerce raiders, then the seven inches of belt armour with which they had been equipped would be adequate. If, on the other hand, they were expected to reinforce a battle line of dreadnoughts with their own heavy guns, they were too thin-skinned to be safe from an enemy's heavy guns. The Invincibles were essentially extremely large, heavily armed, fast armoured cruisers. However, the viability of the armoured cruiser was already in doubt. A cruiser that could have worked with the Fleet might have been a more viable option for taking over that role.

Because of the Invincibles' size and armament, naval authorities considered them capital ships almost from their inception—an assumption that might have been inevitable. Complicating matters further was that many naval authorities, including Lord Fisher, had made overoptimistic assessments from the Battle of Tsushima in 1905 about the armoured cruiser's ability to survive in a battle line against enemy capital ships due to their superior speed. These assumptions had been made without taking into account the Russian Baltic Fleet's inefficiency and tactical ineptitude. By the time the term "battlecruiser" had been given to the Invincibles, the idea of their parity with battleships had been fixed in many people's minds.

Not everyone was so convinced. Brassey's Naval Annual, for instance, stated that with vessels as large and expensive as the Invincibles, an admiral "will be certain to put them in the line of battle where their comparatively light protection will be a disadvantage and their high speed of no value." Those in favor of the battlecruiser countered with two points—first, since all capital ships were vulnerable to new weapons such as the torpedo, armour had lost some of its validity; and second, because of its greater speed, the battlecruiser could control the range at which it engaged an enemy.

== Battlecruisers in the dreadnought arms race ==
Between the launching of the Invincibles to just after the outbreak of the First World War, the battlecruiser played a junior role in the developing dreadnought arms race, as it was never wholeheartedly adopted as the key weapon in British imperial defence, as Fisher had presumably desired. The biggest factor for this lack of acceptance was the marked change in Britain's strategic circumstances between their conception and the commissioning of the first ships. The prospective enemy for Britain had shifted from a Franco-Russian alliance with many armoured cruisers to a resurgent and increasingly belligerent Germany. Diplomatically, Britain had entered the Entente cordiale in 1904 and the Anglo-Russian Entente. Neither France nor Russia posed a particular naval threat; the Russian navy had largely been sunk or captured in the Russo-Japanese War of 1904–1905, while the French were in no hurry to adopt the new dreadnought-type design. Britain also boasted very cordial relations with two of the significant new naval powers: Japan (bolstered by the Anglo-Japanese Alliance, signed in 1902 and renewed in 1905), and the US. These changed strategic circumstances, and the great success of the Dreadnought ensured that she rather than the Invincible became the new model capital ship. Nevertheless, battlecruiser construction played a part in the renewed naval arms race sparked by the Dreadnought.

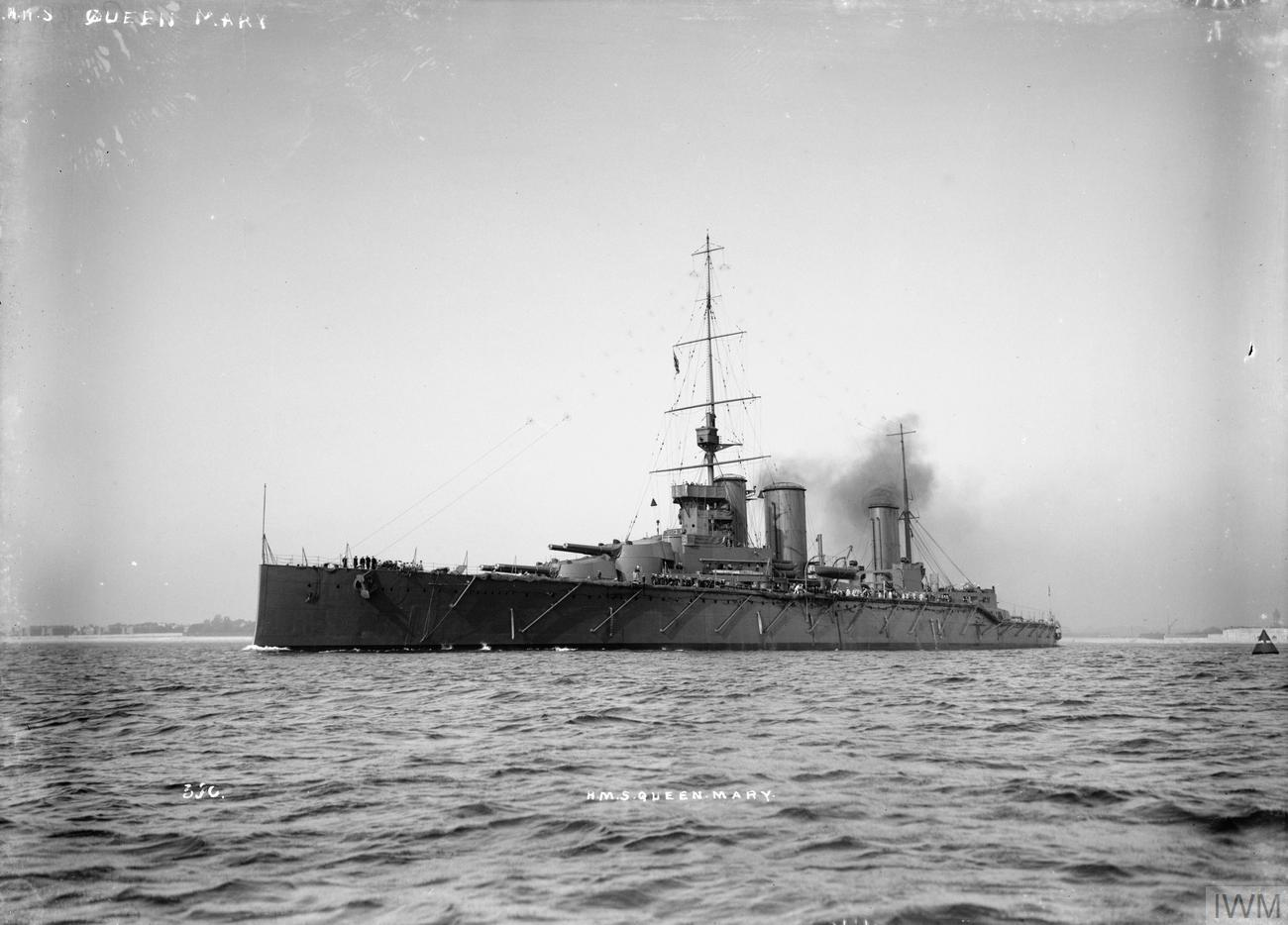
HMS Queen Mary, the last battlecruiser built before World War I

For their first few years of service, the Invincibles entirely fulfilled Fisher's vision of being able to sink any ship fast enough to catch them, and run from any ship capable of sinking them. An Invincible would also, in many circumstances, be able to take on an enemy pre-dreadnought battleship. Naval circles concurred that the armoured cruiser in its current form had come to the logical end of its development and the Invincibles were so far ahead of any enemy armoured cruiser in firepower and speed that it proved difficult to justify building more or bigger cruisers. This lead was extended by the surprise both Dreadnought and Invincible produced by having been built in secret; this prompted most other navies to delay their building programmes and radically revise their designs. This was particularly true for cruisers, because the details of the Invincible class were kept secret for longer; this meant that the last German armoured cruiser, Blücher, was armed with only 21-centimetre (8.3 in) guns, and was no match for the new battlecruisers.

The Royal Navy's early superiority in capital ships led to the rejection of a 1905–1906 design that would, essentially, have fused the battlecruiser and battleship concepts into what would eventually become the fast battleship. The 'X4' design combined the full armour and armament of Dreadnought with the 25-knot speed of Invincible. The additional cost could not be justified given the existing British lead and the new Liberal government's need for economy; the slower and cheaper Bellerophon, a relatively close copy of Dreadnought, was adopted instead. The X4 concept would eventually be fulfilled in the Queen Elizabeth class and later by other navies.

The next British battlecruisers were the three Indefatigable class, slightly improved Invincibles built to fundamentally the same specification, partly due to political pressure to limit costs and partly due to the secrecy surrounding German battlecruiser construction, particularly about the heavy armour of SMS Von der Tann. This class came to be widely seen as a mistake and the next generation of British battlecruisers were markedly more powerful. By 1909–1910 a sense of national crisis about rivalry with Germany outweighed cost-cutting, and a naval panic resulted in the approval of a total of eight capital ships in 1909–1910. Fisher pressed for all eight to be battlecruisers, but was unable to have his way; he had to settle for six battleships and two battlecruisers of the Lion class. The Lions carried eight 13.5-inch guns, the now-standard caliber of the British "super-dreadnought" battleships. Speed increased to 27 knots (50 km/h; 31 mph) and armour protection, while not as good as in German designs, was better than in previous British battlecruisers, with nine-inch (230 mm) armour belt and barbettes. The two Lions were followed by the very similar Queen Mary.

SMS Seydlitz

By 1911 Germany had built battlecruisers of her own, and the superiority of the British ships could no longer be assured. Moreover, the German Navy did not share Fisher's view of the battlecruiser. In contrast to the British focus on increasing speed and firepower, Germany progressively improved the armour and staying power of their ships to better the British battlecruisers. Von der Tann, begun in 1908 and completed in 1910, carried eight 11.1-inch guns, but with 11.1-inch (283 mm) armour she was far better protected than the Invincibles. The two Moltkes were quite similar but carried ten 11.1-inch guns of an improved design. Seydlitz, designed in 1909 and finished in 1913, was a modified Moltke; speed increased by one knot to 26.5 knots (49.1 km/h; 30.5 mph), while her armour had a maximum thickness of 12 inches, equivalent to the Helgoland-class battleships of a few years earlier. Seydlitz was Germany's last battlecruiser completed before World War I.

The next step in battlecruiser design came from Japan. The Imperial Japanese Navy had been planning the Kongō-class ships from 1909, and was determined that, since the Japanese economy could support relatively few ships, each would be more powerful than its likely competitors. Initially the class was planned with the Invincibles as the benchmark. On learning of the British plans for Lion, and the likelihood that new U.S. Navy battleships would be armed with 14-inch (360 mm) guns, the Japanese decided to radically revise their plans and go one better. A new plan was drawn up, carrying eight 14-inch guns, and capable of 27.5 knots (50.9 km/h; 31.6 mph), thus marginally having the edge over the Lions in speed and firepower. The heavy guns were also better-positioned, being superfiring both fore and aft with no turret amidships. The armour scheme was also marginally improved over the Lions, with nine inches of armour on the turrets and 8 inches (203 mm) on the barbettes. The first ship in the class was built in Britain, and a further three constructed in Japan. The Japanese also re-classified their powerful armoured cruisers of the Tsukuba and Ibuki classes, carrying four 12-inch guns, as battlecruisers; nonetheless, their armament was weaker and they were slower than any battlecruiser.

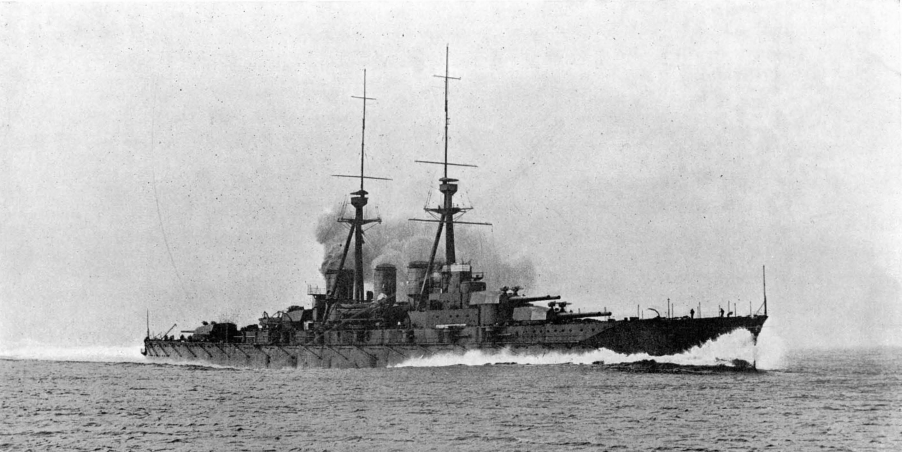
Kongō

The next British battlecruiser, Tiger, was intended initially as the fourth ship in the Lion class, but was substantially redesigned. She retained the eight 13.5-inch guns of her predecessors, but they were positioned like those of Kongō for better fields of fire. She was faster (making 29 knots (54 km/h; 33 mph) on sea trials), and carried a heavier secondary armament. Tiger was also more heavily armoured on the whole; while the maximum thickness of armour was the same at nine inches, the height of the main armour belt was increased. Not all the desired improvements for this ship were approved, however. Her designer, Sir Eustace Tennyson d'Eyncourt, had wanted small-bore water-tube boilers and geared turbines to give her a speed of 32 knots (59 km/h; 37 mph), but he received no support from the authorities and the engine makers refused his request.

1912 saw work begin on three more German battlecruisers of the Derfflinger class, the first German battlecruisers to mount 12-inch guns. These ships, like Tiger and the Kongōs, had their guns arranged in superfiring turrets for greater efficiency. Their armour and speed was similar to the previous Seydlitz class. In 1913, the Russian Empire also began the construction of the four-ship Borodino class, which were designed for service in the Baltic Sea. These ships were designed to carry twelve 14-inch guns, with armour up to 12 inches thick, and a speed of 26.6 knots (49.3 km/h; 30.6 mph). The heavy armour and relatively slow speed of these ships made them more similar to German designs than to British ships; construction of the Borodinos was halted by the First World War and all were scrapped after the end of the Russian Civil War.

== World War I ==
=== Construction ===
For most of the combatants, capital ship construction was very limited during the war. Germany finished the Derfflinger class and began work on the Mackensen class. The Mackensens were a development of the Derfflinger class, with 13.8-inch guns and a broadly similar armour scheme, designed for 28 knots (52 km/h; 32 mph).

In Britain, Jackie Fisher returned to the office of First Sea Lord in October 1914. His enthusiasm for big, fast ships was unabated, and he set designers to producing a design for a battlecruiser with 15-inch guns. Because Fisher expected the next German battlecruiser to steam at 28 knots, he required the new British design to be capable of 32 knots. He planned to reorder two Revenge-class battleships, which had been approved but not yet laid down, to a new design. Fisher finally received approval for this project on 28 December 1914 and they became the Renown class. With six 15-inch guns but only 6-inch armour they were a further step forward from Tiger in firepower and speed, but returned to the level of protection of the first British battlecruisers.

At the same time, Fisher resorted to subterfuge to obtain another three fast, lightly armoured ships that could use several spare 15-inch (381 mm) gun turrets left over from battleship construction. These ships were essentially light battlecruisers, and Fisher occasionally referred to them as such, but officially they were classified as large light cruisers. This unusual designation was required because construction of new capital ships had been placed on hold, while there were no limits on light cruiser construction. They became Courageous and her sisters Glorious and Furious, and there was a bizarre imbalance between their main guns of 15 inches (or 18 inches (457 mm) in Furious) and their armour, which at three inches (76 mm) thickness was on the scale of a light cruiser. The design was generally regarded as a failure (nicknamed in the Fleet Outrageous, Uproarious and Spurious), though the later conversion of the ships to aircraft carriers was very successful. Fisher also speculated about a new mammoth, but lightly built battlecruiser, that would carry 20-inch (508 mm) guns, which he termed HMS Incomparable; this never got beyond the concept stage.

It is often held that the Renown and Courageous classes were designed for Fisher's plan to land troops (possibly Russian) on the German Baltic coast. Specifically, they were designed with a reduced draught, which might be important in the shallow Baltic. This is not clear-cut evidence that the ships were designed for the Baltic: it was considered that earlier ships had too much draught and not enough freeboard under operational conditions. Roberts argues that the focus on the Baltic was probably unimportant at the time the ships were designed, but was inflated later, after the disastrous Dardanelles Campaign.

The final British battlecruiser design of the war was the Admiral class, which was born from a requirement for an improved version of the Queen Elizabeth battleship. The project began at the end of 1915, after Fisher's final departure from the Admiralty. While initially envisaged as a battleship, senior sea officers felt that Britain had enough battleships, but that new battlecruisers might be required to combat German ships being built (the British overestimated German progress on the Mackensen class as well as their likely capabilities). A battlecruiser design with eight 15-inch guns, 8 inches of armour and capable of 32 knots was decided on. The experience of battlecruisers at the Battle of Jutland meant that the design was radically revised and transformed again into a fast battleship with armour up to 12 inches thick, but still capable of 31.5 knots (58.3 km/h; 36.2 mph). The first ship in the class, Hood, was built according to this design to counter the possible completion of any of the Mackensen-class ship. The plans for her three sisters, on which little work had been done, were revised once more later in 1916 and in 1917 to improve protection.

The Admiral class would have been the only British ships capable of taking on the German Mackensen class; nevertheless, German shipbuilding was drastically slowed by the war, and while two Mackensens were launched, none were ever completed. The Germans also worked briefly on a further three ships, of the Ersatz Yorck class, which were modified versions of the Mackensens with 15-inch guns. Work on the three additional Admirals was suspended in March 1917 to enable more escorts and merchant ships to be built to deal with the new threat from U-boats to trade. They were finally cancelled in February 1919.

=== Battlecruisers in action ===
The first combat involving battlecruisers during World War I was the Battle of Heligoland Bight in August 1914. A force of British light cruisers and destroyers entered the Heligoland Bight (the part of the North Sea closest to Hamburg) to attack German destroyer patrols. When they met opposition from light cruisers, Vice Admiral David Beatty took his squadron of five battlecruisers into the Bight and turned the tide of the battle, ultimately sinking three German light cruisers and killing their commander, Rear Admiral Leberecht Maass.

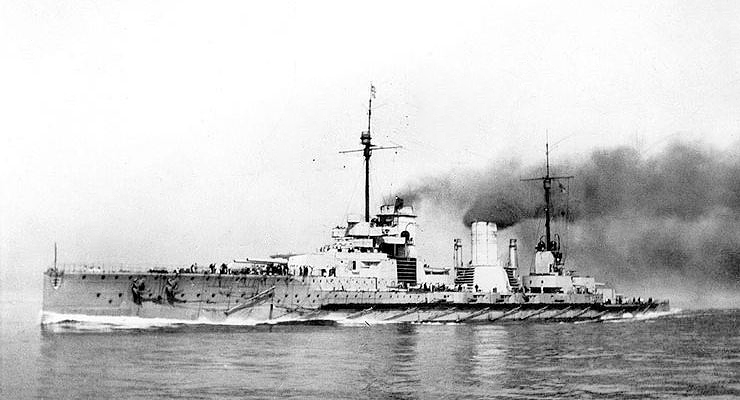
Seydlitz was heavily damaged in the Battle of Dogger Bank

The German battlecruiser Goeben perhaps made the most impact early in the war. Stationed in the Mediterranean, she and the escorting light cruiser SMS Breslau evaded British and French ships on the outbreak of war, and steamed to Constantinople (Istanbul) with two British battlecruisers in hot pursuit. The two German ships were handed over to the Ottoman Navy, and this was instrumental in bringing the Ottoman Empire into the war as one of the Central Powers. Goeben herself, renamed Yavuz Sultan Selim, fought engagements against the Imperial Russian Navy in the Black Sea before being knocked out of the action for the remainder of the war after the Battle of Imbros against British forces in the Aegean Sea in January 1918.

The original battlecruiser concept proved successful in December 1914 at the Battle of the Falkland Islands. The British battlecruisers Inflexible and Invincible did precisely the job for which they were intended when they chased down and annihilated the German East Asia Squadron, centered on the armoured cruisers Scharnhorst and Gneisenau, along with three light cruisers, commanded by Admiral Maximilian Graf Von Spee, in the South Atlantic Ocean. Prior to the battle, the Australian battlecruiser Australia had unsuccessfully searched for the German ships in the Pacific.

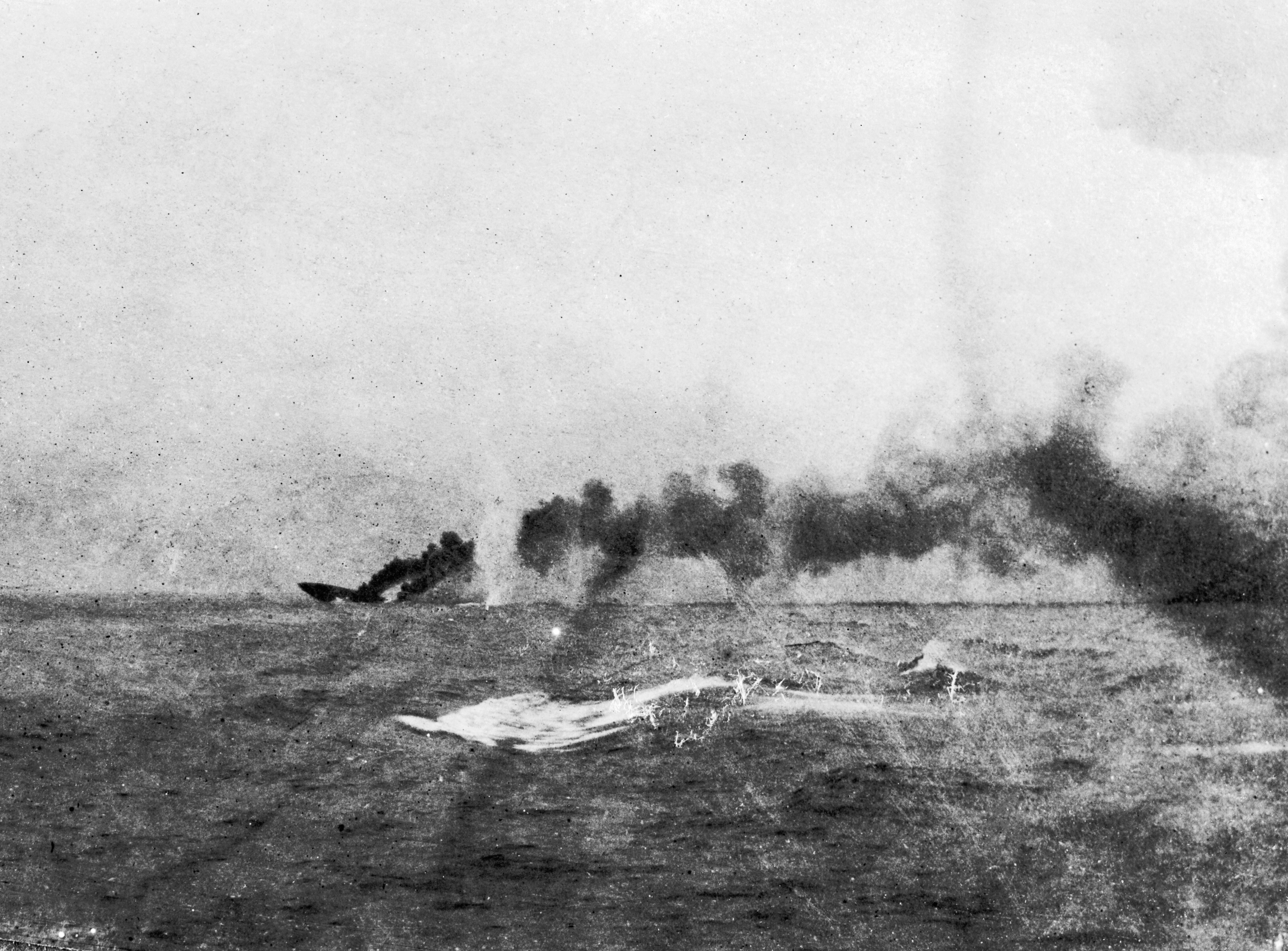
Indefatigable sinking during the Battle of Jutland

During the Battle of Dogger Bank in 1915, the aftermost barbette of the German flagship Seydlitz was struck by a British 13.5-inch shell from HMS Lion. The shell did not penetrate the barbette, but it dislodged a piece of the barbette armour that allowed the flame from the shell's detonation to enter the barbette. The propellant charges being hoisted upwards were ignited, and the fireball flashed up into the turret and down into the magazine, setting fire to charges removed from their brass cartridge cases. The gun crew tried to escape into the next turret, which allowed the flash to spread into that turret as well, killing the crews of both turrets. Seydlitz was saved from near-certain destruction only by emergency flooding of her after magazines, which had been effected by Wilhelm Heidkamp. This near-disaster was due to the way that ammunition handling was arranged and was common to both German and British battleships and battlecruisers, but the lighter protection on the latter made them more vulnerable to the turret or barbette being penetrated. The Germans learned from investigating the damaged Seydlitz and instituted measures to ensure that ammunition handling minimised any possible exposure to flash.

Apart from the cordite handling, the battle was mostly inconclusive, though both the British flagship Lion and Seydlitz were severely damaged. Lion lost speed, causing her to fall behind the rest of the battleline, and Beatty was unable to effectively command his ships for the remainder of the engagement. A British signalling error allowed the German battlecruisers to withdraw, as most of Beatty's squadron mistakenly concentrated on the crippled armoured cruiser Blücher, sinking her with great loss of life. The British blamed their failure to win a decisive victory on their poor gunnery and attempted to increase their rate of fire by stockpiling unprotected cordite charges in their ammunition hoists and barbettes.

At the Battle of Jutland on 31 May 1916, both British and German battlecruisers were employed as fleet units. The British battlecruisers became engaged with both their German counterparts, the battlecruisers, and then German battleships before the arrival of the battleships of the British Grand Fleet. The result was a disaster for the Royal Navy's battlecruiser squadrons: Invincible, Queen Mary, and Indefatigable exploded with the loss of all but a handful of their crews. The exact reason why the ships' magazines detonated is not known, but the abundance of exposed cordite charges stored in their turrets, ammunition hoists and working chambers in the quest to increase their rate of fire undoubtedly contributed to their loss. Beatty's flagship Lion herself was almost lost in a similar manner, save for the heroic actions of Major Francis Harvey.

The better-armoured German battlecruisers fared better, in part due to the poor performance of British fuzes (the British shells tended to explode or break up on impact with the German armour). Lützow—the only German battlecruiser lost at Jutland—had only 128 killed, for instance, despite receiving more than thirty hits. The other German battlecruisers, Moltke, Von der Tann, Seydlitz, and Derfflinger, were all heavily damaged and required extensive repairs after the battle, Seydlitz barely making it home, for they had been the focus of British fire for much of the battle.

== Interwar period ==
In the years immediately after World War I, Britain, Japan and the US all began design work on a new generation of ever more powerful battleships and battlecruisers. The new burst of shipbuilding that each nation's navy desired was politically controversial and potentially economically crippling. This nascent arms race was prevented by the Washington Naval Treaty of 1922, where the major naval powers agreed to limits on capital ship numbers. The German navy was not represented at the talks; under the terms of the Treaty of Versailles, Germany was not allowed any modern capital ships at all.

Through the 1920s and 1930s only Britain and Japan retained battlecruisers, often modified and rebuilt from their original designs. The line between the battlecruiser and the modern fast battleship became blurred; indeed, the Japanese Kongōs were formally redesignated as battleships after their very comprehensive reconstruction in the 1930s.

=== Plans in the aftermath of World War I ===
Hood, launched in 1918, was the last World War I battlecruiser to be completed. Owing to lessons from Jutland, the ship was modified during construction; the thickness of her belt armour was increased by an average of 50 percent and extended substantially, she was given heavier deck armour, and the protection of her magazines was improved to guard against the ignition of ammunition. This was hoped to be capable of resisting her own weapons—the classic measure of a "balanced" battleship. Hood was the largest ship in the Royal Navy when completed; because of her great displacement, in theory she combined the firepower and armour of a battleship with the speed of a battlecruiser, causing some to refer to her as a fast battleship. However, her protection was markedly less than that of the British battleships built immediately after World War I, the Nelson class.

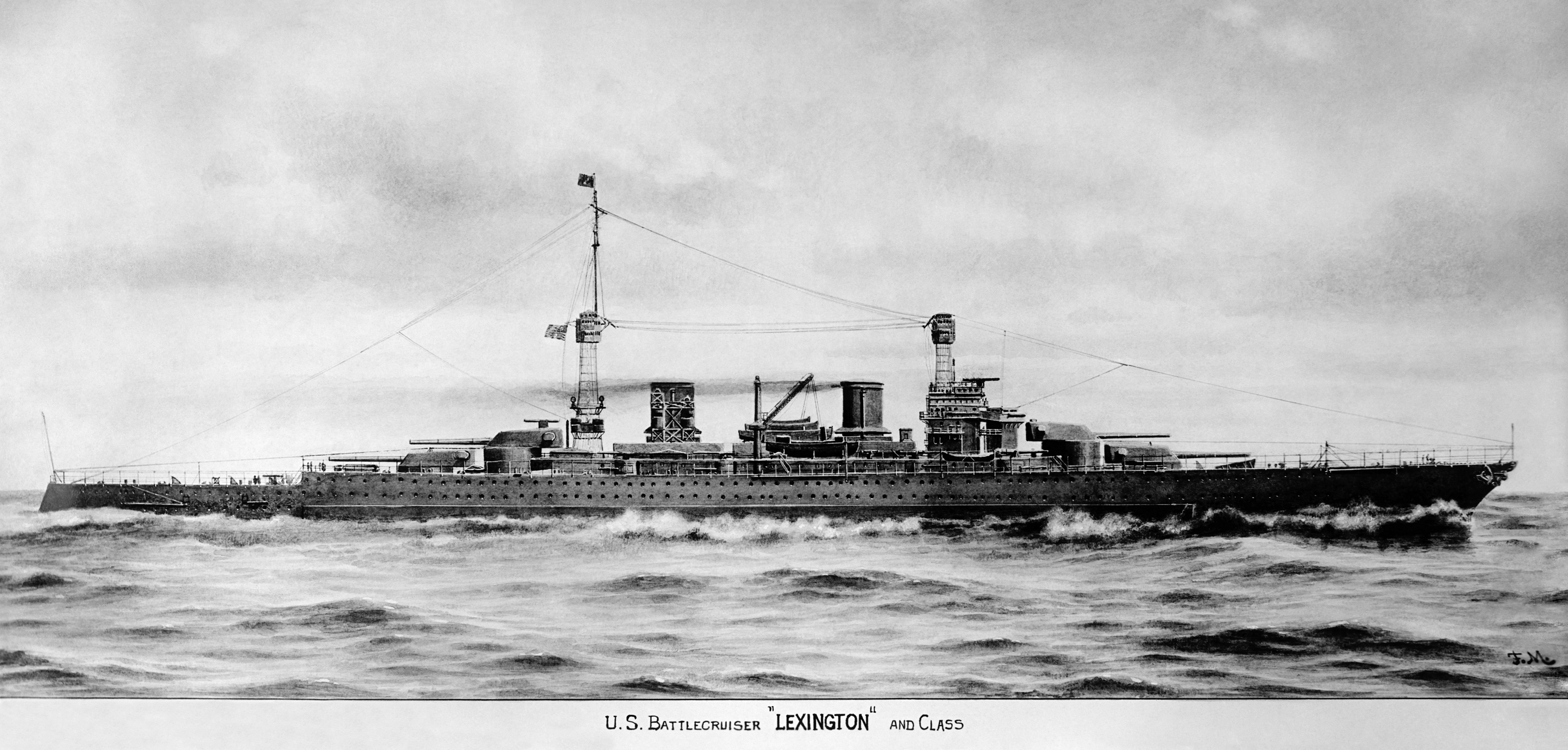
Lexington-class battlecruiser (painting, c. 1919)

The navies of Japan and the United States, not being affected immediately by the war, had time to develop new heavy 16-inch (410 mm) guns for their latest designs and to refine their battlecruiser designs in light of combat experience in Europe. The Imperial Japanese Navy began four Amagi-class battlecruisers. These vessels would have been of unprecedented size and power, as fast and well armoured as Hood whilst carrying a main battery of ten 16-inch guns, the most powerful armament ever proposed for a battlecruiser. They were, for all intents and purposes, fast battleships—the only differences between them and the Tosa-class battleships which were to precede them were 1 inch (25 mm) less side armour and a .25 knots (0.46 km/h; 0.29 mph) increase in speed. The United States Navy, which had worked on its battlecruiser designs since 1913 and watched the latest developments in this class with great care, responded with the Lexington class. If completed as planned, they would have been exceptionally fast and well armed with eight 16-inch guns, but carried armour little better than the Invincibles—this after an 8,000-long-ton (8,100 t) increase in protection following Jutland. The final stage in the post-war battlecruiser race came with the British response to the Amagi and Lexington types: four 48,000-long-ton (49,000 t) G3 battlecruisers. Royal Navy documents of the period often described any battleship with a speed of over about 24 knots (44 km/h; 28 mph) as a battlecruiser, regardless of the amount of protective armour, although the G3 was considered by most to be a well-balanced fast battleship.

The Washington Naval Treaty meant that none of these designs came to fruition. Ships that had been started were either broken up on the slipway or converted to aircraft carriers. In Japan, Amagi and Akagi were selected for conversion. Amagi was damaged beyond repair by the 1923 Great Kantō earthquake and was broken up for scrap; the hull of one of the proposed Tosa-class battleships, Kaga, was converted in her stead. The United States Navy also converted two battlecruiser hulls into aircraft carriers in the wake of the Washington Treaty: USS Lexington and USS Saratoga, although this was only considered marginally preferable to scrapping the hulls outright (the remaining four: Constellation, Ranger, Constitution and United States were scrapped). In Britain, Fisher's "large light cruisers," were converted to carriers. Furious had already been partially converted during the war and Glorious and Courageous were similarly converted.

=== Rebuilding programmes ===
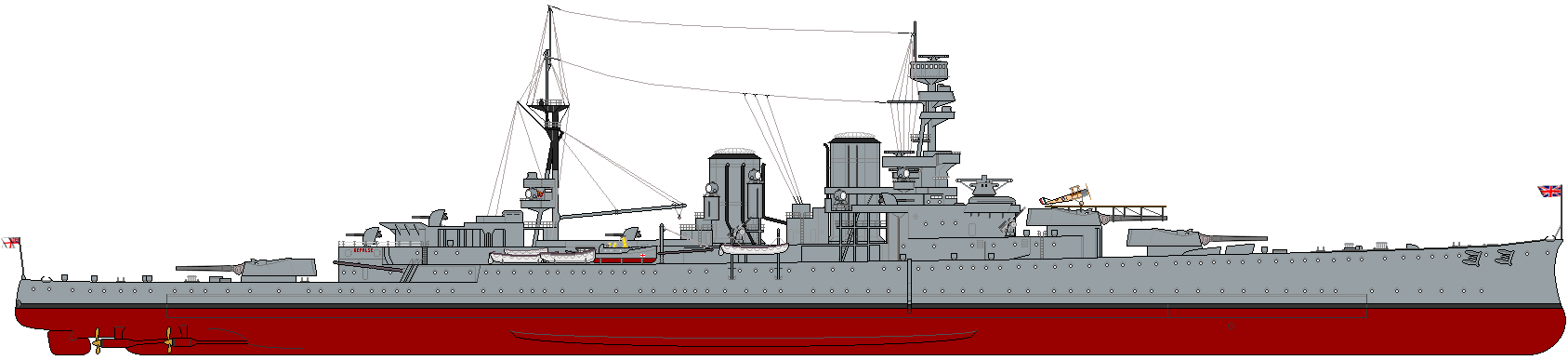
Repulse as she was in 1919

In total, nine battlecruisers survived the Washington Naval Treaty, although HMS Tiger later became a victim of the London Naval Conference 1930 and was scrapped. Because their high speed made them valuable surface units in spite of their weaknesses, most of these ships were significantly updated before World War II. Renown and Repulse were modernized significantly in the 1920s and 1930s. Between 1934 and 1936, Repulse was partially modernized and had her bridge modified, an aircraft hangar, catapult and new gunnery equipment added and her anti-aircraft armament increased. Renown underwent a more thorough reconstruction between 1937 and 1939. Her deck armour was increased, new turbines and boilers were fitted, an aircraft hangar and catapult added and she was completely rearmed aside from the main guns which had their elevation increased to +30 degrees. The bridge structure was also removed and a large bridge similar to that used in the King George V-class battleships installed in its place. While conversions of this kind generally added weight to the vessel, Renown's tonnage actually decreased due to a substantially lighter power plant. Similar thorough rebuildings planned for Repulse and Hood were cancelled due to the advent of World War II.

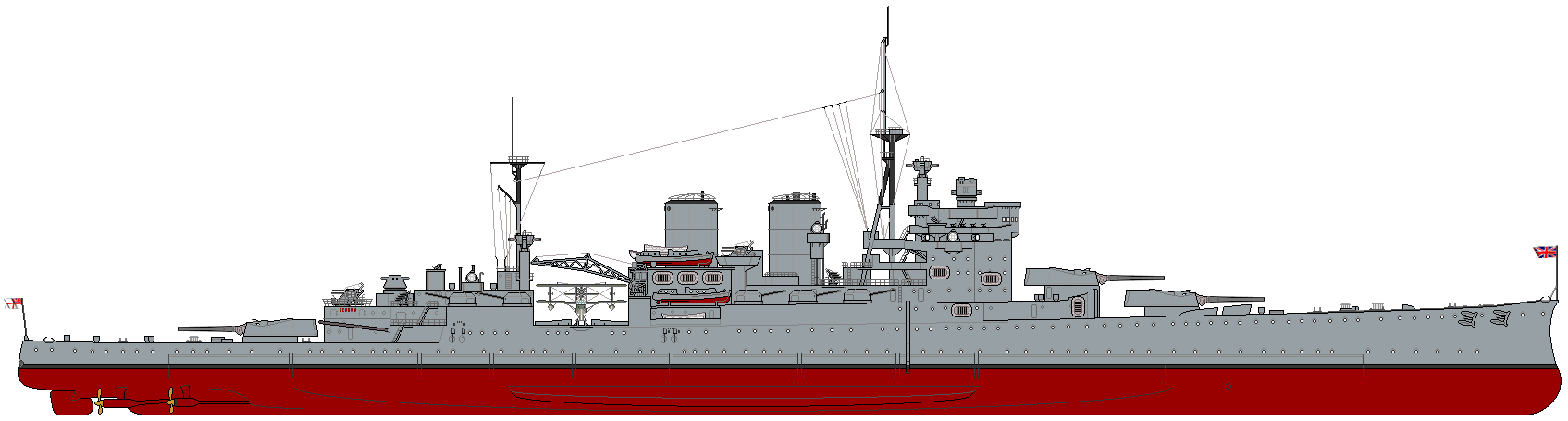
Renown, as reconstructed, in 1939

Unable to build new ships, the Imperial Japanese Navy also chose to improve its existing battlecruisers of the Kongō class (initially the Haruna, Kirishima, and Kongō—the Hiei only later as it had been disarmed under the terms of the Washington treaty) in two substantial reconstructions (one for Hiei). During the first of these, elevation of their main guns was increased to +40 degrees, anti-torpedo bulges and 3,800 long tons (3,900 t) of horizontal armour added, and a "pagoda" mast with additional command positions built up. This reduced the ships' speed to 25.9 knots (48.0 km/h; 29.8 mph). The second reconstruction focused on speed as they had been selected as fast escorts for aircraft carrier task forces. Completely new main engines, a reduced number of boilers and an increase in hull length by 26 feet (7.9 m) allowed them to reach up to 30 knots once again. They were reclassified as "fast battleships," although their armour and guns still fell short compared to surviving World War I–era battleships in the American or the British navies, with dire consequences during the Pacific War, when Hiei and Kirishima were easily crippled by US gunfire during actions off Guadalcanal, forcing their scuttling shortly afterwards. Perhaps most tellingly, Hiei was crippled by medium-caliber gunfire from heavy and light cruisers in a close-range night engagement.

There were two exceptions: Turkey's Yavuz Sultan Selim and the Royal Navy's Hood. The Turkish Navy made only minor improvements to the ship in the interwar period, which primarily focused on repairing wartime damage and the installation of new fire control systems and anti-aircraft batteries. Hood was in constant service with the fleet and could not be withdrawn for an extended reconstruction. She received minor improvements over the course of the 1930s, including modern fire control systems, increased numbers of anti-aircraft guns, and in March 1941, radar.

=== Naval rearmament ===
In the late 1930s navies began to build capital ships again, and during this period a number of large commerce raiders and small, fast battleships were built that are sometimes referred to as battlecruisers, such as the Scharnhorst-class battleships and Deutschland-class cruisers and the French Dunkerque-class battleships. (Note: The German Scharnhorst-class battleships and Deutschland-class cruisers and the French Dunkerque-class battleships are all sometimes referred to as battlecruisers, although the owning navies referred to them as "battleships" (German: Schlachtschiffe), "armoured ships" (German: Panzerschiffe) and "battleships" (French: Bâtiments de ligne) respectively. Since neither their operators nor a significant number of naval historians classify them as such, they are not discussed in this article.) Germany and Russia designed new battlecruisers during this period, though only the latter laid down two of the 35,000-ton Kronshtadt class. They were still on the slipways when the Germans invaded in 1941 and construction was suspended. Both ships were scrapped after the war. The Germans planned three battlecruisers of the O class as part of the expansion of the Kriegsmarine (Plan Z). With six 15-inch guns, high speed, excellent range, but very thin armour, they were intended as commerce raiders. Only one was ordered shortly before World War II; no work was ever done on it. No names were assigned, and they were known by their contract names: 'O', 'P', and 'Q'. The new class was not universally welcomed in the Kriegsmarine. Their abnormally-light protection gained it the derogatory nickname Ohne Panzer Quatsch (without armour nonsense) within certain circles of the Navy.

== World War II ==
The Royal Navy deployed some of its battlecruisers during the Norwegian campaign in April 1940. The Gneisenau and the Scharnhorst were engaged during the action off Lofoten by Renown in very bad weather and disengaged after Gneisenau was damaged. One of Renown's 15-inch shells passed through Gneisenau's director-control tower without exploding, severing electrical and communication cables as it went and destroyed the rangefinders for the forward 150 mm (5.9 in) turrets. Main-battery fire control had to be shifted aft due to the loss of electrical power. Another shell from Renown knocked out Gneisenau's aft turret. The British ship was struck twice by German shells that failed to inflict any significant damage. She was the only pre-war battlecruiser to survive the war.

In the early years of the war various German ships had a measure of success hunting merchant ships in the Atlantic. Allied battlecruisers such as Renown, Repulse, and the fast battleships Dunkerque and Strasbourg were employed on operations to hunt down the commerce-raiding German ships. The one stand-up fight occurred when the battleship Bismarck and the heavy cruiser Prinz Eugen sortied into the North Atlantic to attack British shipping and were intercepted by Hood and the battleship Prince of Wales in May 1941 in the Battle of the Denmark Strait. Hood was destroyed when the Bismarck's 15-inch shells caused a magazine explosion. Only three men survived.

The first battlecruiser to see action in the Pacific War was Repulse when she was sunk by Japanese torpedo bombers north of Singapore on 10 December 1941 whilst in company with Prince of Wales. She was lightly damaged by a single 250-kilogram (550 lb) bomb and near-missed by two others in the first Japanese attack. Her speed and agility enabled her to avoid the other attacks by level bombers and dodge 33 torpedoes. The last group of torpedo bombers attacked from multiple directions and Repulse was struck by five torpedoes. She quickly capsized with the loss of 27 officers and 486 crewmen; 42 officers and 754 enlisted men were rescued by the escorting destroyers. The loss of Repulse and Prince of Wales conclusively proved the vulnerability of capital ships to aircraft without air cover of their own.

The Japanese Kongō-class battlecruisers were extensively used as carrier escorts for most of their wartime career due to their high speed. Although classified as fast battleships by the Japanese, their World War I–era armament was weaker and their upgraded armour was still thin compared to contemporary battleships. On 13 November 1942, during the First Naval Battle of Guadalcanal, Hiei stumbled across American cruisers and destroyers at point-blank range. The ship was badly damaged in the encounter and had to be towed by her sister ship Kirishima. Both were spotted by American aircraft the following morning and Kirishima was forced to cast off her tow because of repeated aerial attacks. Hiei's captain ordered her crew to abandon ship after further damage and scuttled Hiei in the early evening of 14 November. On the night of 14/15 November during the Second Naval Battle of Guadalcanal, Kirishima returned to Ironbottom Sound, but encountered the American battleships South Dakota and Washington. While failing to detect Washington, Kirishima engaged South Dakota with some effect. Washington opened fire a few minutes later at short range and badly damaged Kirishima, knocking out her aft turrets, jamming her rudder, and hitting the ship below the waterline. The flooding proved to be uncontrollable and Kirishima capsized three and a half hours later.

Returning to Japan after the Battle of Leyte Gulf, Kongō was torpedoed and sunk by the American submarine Sealion II on 21 November 1944. Haruna was moored at Kure, Japan when the naval base was attacked by American carrier aircraft on 24 and 28 July 1945. The ship was only lightly damaged by a single bomb hit on 24 July, but was hit a dozen more times on 28 July and sank at her pier. She was refloated after the war and scrapped in early 1946.

=== Large cruisers or "cruiser killers" ===
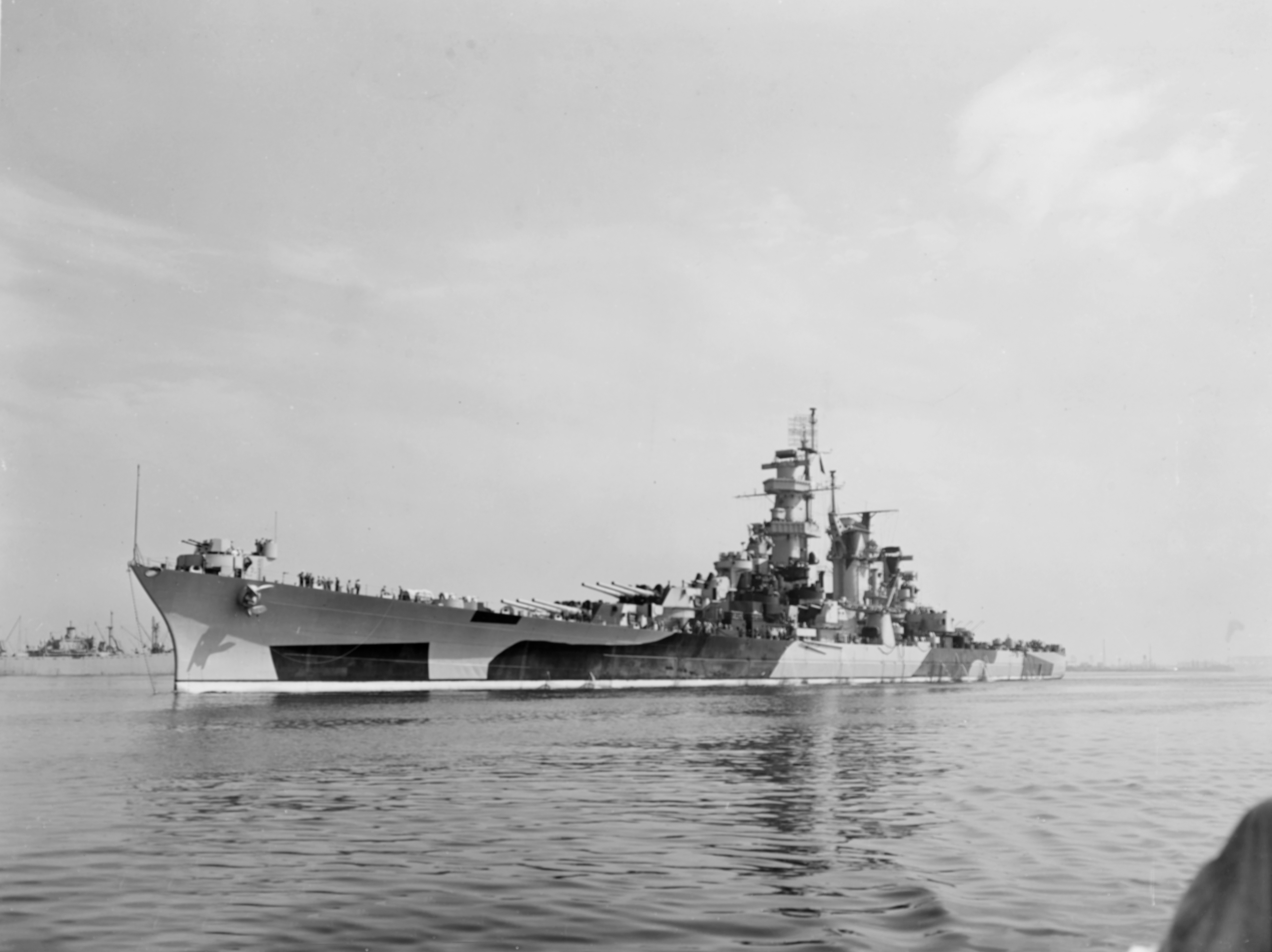
USS Alaska, one of the United States Navy's two "large cruisers"

A late renaissance in popularity of ships between battleships and cruisers in size occurred on the eve of World War II. Described by some as battlecruisers, but never classified as capital ships, they were variously described as "super cruisers", "large cruisers" or even "unrestricted cruisers". The Dutch, American, and Japanese navies all planned these new classes specifically to counter the heavy cruisers, or their counterparts, being built by their naval rivals.

The first such battlecruisers were the Dutch Design 1047, designed to protect their colonies in the East Indies in the face of Japanese aggression. Never officially assigned names, these ships were designed with German and Italian assistance. While they broadly resembled the German Scharnhorst class and had the same main battery, they would have been more lightly armoured and only protected against eight-inch gunfire. Although the design was mostly completed, work on the vessels never commenced as the Germans overran the Netherlands in May 1940. The first ship would have been laid down in June of that year.

The only class of these late battlecruisers actually built were the United States Navy's Alaska-class "large cruisers". Two of them were completed, Alaska and Guam; a third, Hawaii, was cancelled while under construction and three others, to be named Philippines, Puerto Rico and Samoa, were cancelled before they were laid down. The USN classified them "large cruisers" instead of battlecruisers. These ships were named after territories or protectorates, while battleships were named after states and cruisers after cities. With a displacement of 27,000 long tons (27,000 t) and a main armament of nine 12-inch guns in three triple turrets, they were twice the size of Baltimore-class cruisers and had guns some 50% larger in diameter. The Alaskas design was a scaled-up cruiser rather than a lighter/faster battleship derivative, as they lacked the thick armoured belt and intricate torpedo defence system of contemporary battleships. However, unlike World War I-era battlecruisers, the Alaskas were considered a balanced design according to cruiser standards as their protection could withstand fire from their own caliber of gun, albeit only in a very narrow range band. They were designed to hunt down Japanese heavy cruisers, though by the time they entered service most Japanese cruisers had been sunk by American aircraft or submarines. Like the contemporary Iowa-class fast battleships, their speed ultimately made them more useful as carrier escorts and bombardment ships than as the surface combatants they were developed to be.

The Japanese started designing the B64 class, which was similar to the Alaska but with 310-millimetre (12.2 in) guns. News of the Alaskas led them to upgrade the design, creating Design B-65. Armed with 356 mm guns, the B65s would have been the best armed of the new breed of battlecruisers, but they still would have had only sufficient protection to keep out eight-inch shells. Much like the Dutch, the Japanese got as far as completing the design for the B65s, but never laid them down. By the time the designs were ready the Japanese Navy recognized that they had little use for the vessels and that their priority for construction should lie with aircraft carriers. Like the Alaskas, the Japanese did not call these ships battlecruisers, referring to them instead as super-heavy cruisers.

== Cold War–era designs ==
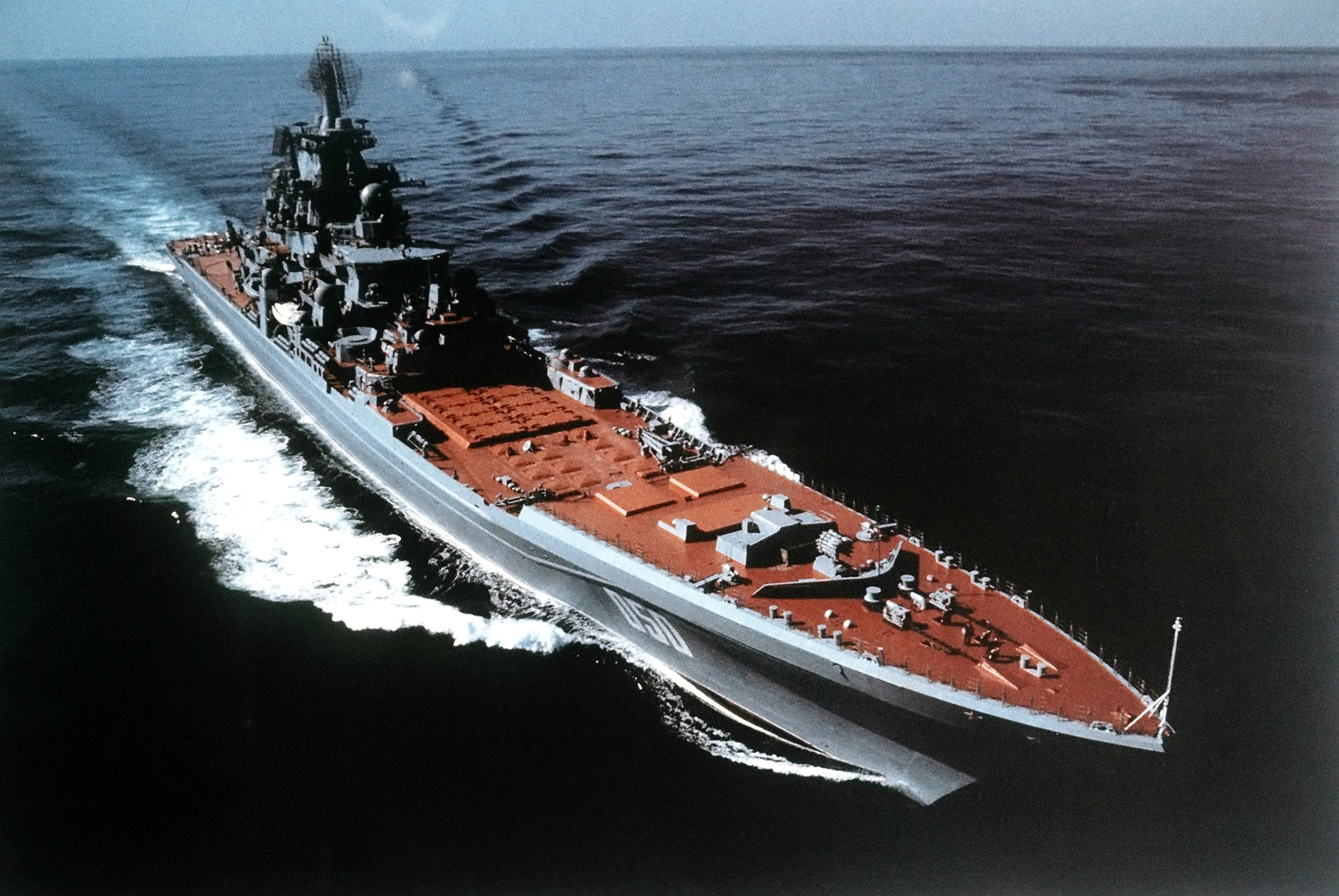
Admiral Lazarev, formerly Frunze, the second ship of her class

In spite of the fact that most navies abandoned the battleship and battlecruiser concepts after World War II, Joseph Stalin's fondness for big-gun-armed warships caused the Soviet Union to plan a large cruiser class in the late 1940s. In the Soviet Navy, they were termed "heavy cruisers" (tyazhelny kreyser). The fruits of this program were the Project 82 (Stalingrad) cruisers, of 36,500 tonnes (35,900 long tons) standard load, nine 305 mm (12 in) guns and a speed of 35 knots (65 km/h; 40 mph). Three ships were laid down in 1951–1952, but they were cancelled in April 1953 after Stalin's death. Only the central armoured hull section of the first ship, Stalingrad, was launched in 1954 and then used as a target.

The Soviet Kirov class is sometimes referred to as a battlecruiser. This description arises from their over 24,000-tonne (24,000-long-ton) displacement, which is roughly equal to that of a First World War battleship and more than twice the displacement of contemporary cruisers; upon entry into service, Kirov was the largest surface combatant to be built since World War II. The Kirov class lacks the armour that distinguishes battlecruisers from ordinary cruisers and they are classified as heavy nuclear-powered missile cruisers (Тяжелый Атомный Ракетный Крейсер (ТАРКР)) by Russia, with their primary surface armament consisting of twenty P-700 Granit surface-to-surface missiles. Four members of the class were completed during the 1980s and 1990s, but due to budget constraints only the Pyotr Velikiy is operational with the Russian Navy, though plans were announced in 2010 to return the other three ships to service. As of 2021, Admiral Nakhimov was being refitted, but the other two ships are reportedly beyond economical repair.

== Operators ==
- Russian Navy operates one Kirov-class battlecruiser with one more being overhauled.

=== Former operators ===
- Imperial German Navy five surviving battlecruisers were all scuttled at Scapa Flow in 1919.
- Royal Australian Navy decommissioned its only battlecruiser HMAS Australia in 1921.
- Imperial Japanese Navy whose Kongo-class battlecruisers (upgraded and reclassified as fast battleships in the 1930s) all served in and were sunk in World War II, the last in 1945.
- Royal Navy last battlecruiser, HMS Renown was decommissioned in 1945, following World War II.
- United States Navy two Alaska-class large cruisers were both decommissioned in 1947.
- Turkish Naval Forces decommissioned its only battlecruiser TCG Yavuz in 1950.

== See also ==
- List of battlecruisers
- List of ships of the Second World War
- List of sunken battlecruisers
