= List of yard and district craft of the United States Navy =

Ships of the United States Navy

Ships in current service
- Current ships

Ships grouped alphabetically
- A–B; C; D–F; G–H; I–K; L; M; N–O; P; Q–R; S; T–V; W–Z

Ships grouped by type
- Aircraft carriers; Airships; Amphibious warfare ships; Auxiliaries; Battlecruisers; Battleships; Cruisers; Destroyers; Destroyer escorts; Destroyer leaders; Escort carriers; Frigates; Hospital ships; Littoral combat ships; Mine warfare vessels; Monitors; Oilers; Patrol vessels; Registered civilian vessels; Sailing frigates; Steam frigates; Steam gunboats; Ships of the line; Sloops of war; Submarines; Torpedo boats; Torpedo retrievers; Unclassified miscellaneous; Yard and district craft

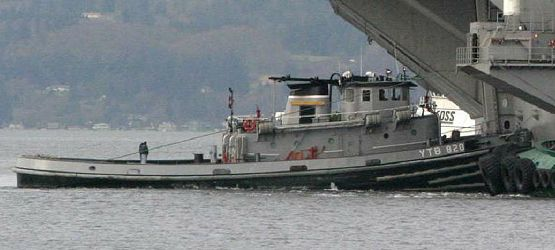
Wanamassa (YTB-820)

This is a list of yard and district craft of the United States Navy. It covers the various types of craft and ships that support the bases and harbors of the United States Navy. The hull classification symbols for these craft begin with (Y).

Ship status is indicated as either currently active [A] (including ready reserve), inactive [I], or precommissioning [P]. Ships in the inactive category include only ships in the inactive reserve, ships which have been disposed from US service have no listed status. Ships in the precommissioning category include ships under construction or on order.

== Historical overview ==
Yard and district craft of the United States Navy perform similar functions as auxiliaries but generally are smaller and less capable than their ocean-going counterparts, and so they generally remain in harbors and coastal areas unless transiting to new assignments.

This list demonstrates that the US Navy constantly recycles and repurposes its small craft for new roles. Some craft on this list have had as many as six such conversions in their history. Some of these conversions have been surprising from an environmental viewpoint, such as the conversion of fuel oil barges into water barges. Some conversions have been surprising from an economic viewpoint, such as the simultaneous conversions of open barges to covered barges during the conversions of covered barges to open barges, which can be justified only by relatively high transportation costs.

The District auxiliary, miscellaneous (YAG) designation has been used as a cover for at least two ships employed in classified tests of biological, chemical, and nuclear weapons (aka WMD).

Some of these vessels have held prior or later classifications as unclassified miscellaneous (IX), or more rarely as auxiliaries miscellaneous (AG, T-AG).

== Ash barges (YA) ==
- YA-18, ex-YO-37, ex-YE-14, later YCF-5, YFN-570
- YA-43, later YF-56
- YA-44, later YF-54
- YA-52, lost due to enemy action in the Philippines
- YA-59, lost due to enemy action in the Philippines
- YA-65, lost due to enemy action in the Philippines

== District auxiliary, miscellaneous (YAG) ==
For similar lists of 'miscellaneous' ships see

List of auxiliaries of the United States Navy § Miscellaneous ships (AG, T-AG)

and

List of unclassified miscellaneous vessels of the United States Navy (IX)

- Tatoosh (YAG-1)
- YAG-2, lost due to enemy action in the Philippines
- YAG-3, lost due to enemy action in the Philippines
- YAG-4, sunk by Japanese gunfire in South Harbor, Corregidor, 12 April 1942
- YAG-5
- YAG-6
- YAG-7, patrol vessel
- YAG-8, later AG-47, weather ship
- YAG-9, later AG-48, weather ship, sunk 9 September 1942 by U-755
- YAG-10, acquisition canceled
- Baranof (YAG-11), cargo ship for Alaskan bases
- YAG-12, liberty ferry and barracks ship
- YAG-13, ex-Palace (PYc-33)
- YAG-14, ex-Tourist (PYc-32)
- Mindoro (YAG-15)
- YAG-16, cargo ship for Bahamian and Cuban bases
- YAG-17, moored attack transport simulator, wrecked in the 1944 Great Atlantic hurricane 14 September 1944
- YAG-18, refrigerator cargo ship for Caribbean bases
- YAG-19, cargo ship for Caribbean bases
- YAG-20, ex-YHB-15, cargo ship for Caribbean bases
- YAG-21, ex-YHB-17, cargo ship for Caribbean bases, grounded near Key West 2 March 1945
- YAG-22, later YF-568
- Ensenada (YAG-23), refrigerator cargo ship
- Awahou (YAG-24)
- Port Whangarei (YAG-25)
- Taupata (YAG-26)
- Kohi (YAG-27), sailing scow
- YAG-28, cargo ship for Caribbean bases
- YAG-29, ex-CG-4
- YAG-30
- YAG-31
- Christiana (YAG-32), seaplane tender, ex-IX-80
- YAG-33, ex-USAS FS-80
- YAG-34, torpedo range tender
- Nashawena (YAG-35), ex-AG-142, cable repair craft
- Floyd W. Spencer (YAG-36), experimental minesweeper
- John L. Sullivan (YAG-37), experimental minesweeper
- Edward Kavanagh (YAG-38), experimental minesweeper
- George Eastman (YAG-39), WMD test ship (Note: USS George Eastman participated in Operation Castle, Operation Wigwam, Operation Redwing, and Project SHAD)
- Granville S. Hall (YAG-40), WMD test ship (Note: USS Granville S. Hall participated in Operation Castle and Project SHAD)
- YAG-41 through YAG-44, not used, intended for first 4 Guardian-class YAGR radar picket ships
- YAG-45 through YAG-55, not used, planned ship acquisitions canceled
- YAG-56, not used, intended for USS Compass Island (E-AG-153)
- YAG-57, not used, intended for USS Observation Island (E-AG-154)
- YAG-58, not used, intended for USS Francis Marion (APA-249) or for Jupiter ballistic missile ship
- Michael Moran (YAG-59)
- Butternut (YAG-60), ex-AN-9, ANL-9, missile range ship
- Monob One (Mobile Noise Barge) (YAG-61), ex-YW-87, ex-IX-309
- Deer Island (YAG-62)
- Saluda (YAG-87), sailing yawl, sound test ship, ex-IX-87

== Radar picket ships (YAGR) ==
Guardian-class radar picket ship

All Guardian-class ships were reclassed as AGR in 1958; they were originally intended to be classed as District auxiliaries, miscellaneous (YAG) - see YAG-41 through YAG-44 - but this was not done.

- USS Guardian (YAGR-1)
- USS Lookout (YAGR-2)
- USS Skywatcher (YAGR-3)
- USS Searcher (YAGR-4)
- USS Scanner (YAGR-5)
- USS Locator (YAGR-6)
- USS Picket (YAGR-7)
- USS Interceptor (YAGR-8)
- USS Investigator (YAGR-9)
- USS Outpost (YAGR-10)
- USS Protector (YAGR-11)
- USS Vigil (YAGR-12)
- USS Interdictor (YAGR-13)
- USS Interpreter (YAGR-14)
- USS Interrupter (YAGR-15)
- USS Watchman (YAGR-16)

== Open barges (YC, YCK) ==
- YC-119, later YFN-48
- YC-164, later YR-5
- YC-174, later YFN-86, lost Philippines 1942
- YC-179, later YFN-162
- YC-181, lost due to enemy action in the Philippines 1942
- YC-203, later YFN-211
- YC-210, later YF-53
- YC-263, later YFN-674, YHB-36
- YC-239, later YFN-198
- YC-246, later YFN-200
- YC-261, later YFN-250
- YC-264, later YFN-251
- YC-271, ex-YE-39, later YFN-243
- YC-273, later YFN-244
- YC-274, later YR-20
- YC-275, later YFN-208
- YC-276, later YFN-209
- YC-278, later YFN-248
- YC-280, ex-YFN-239, later YRB-14
- YC-282, ex-YE-38, later YFN-242
- YC-284, later YFN-254
- YC-285, later YFN-246
- YC-291, later YFN-225
- YC-292, ex-YE-34, later YFN-238
- YC-294, later YR-21
- YC-295, later YFN-253
- YC-296, later YR-22
- YC-303, later YFN-187
- YC-305, later YFN-255
- YC-311, later YFN-247
- YC-315, later YFN-249
- YC-321, later YFN-217
- YC-326, later YFN-70
- YC-327, later YFN-71
- YC-328, later YFN-90
- YC-329, later YFN-91
- YC-331, later YFN-74
- YC-332, later YFN-75
- YC-333, later YFN-76
- YC-351, later YFN-83
- YC-352, later YFN-84, destroyed 1943
- YC-353, later YFN-85
- YC-363, later YFN-88
- YC-364, later YFN-89
- YC-383, later YFN-199
- YC-412, later YFN-111
- YC-415, later YCD-1, YOS-1
- YC-442 - sank 11 September 1923
- YC-446, later YFN-87
- YC-455, later YR-8
- YC-456, later YR-9
- YC-462, later YFN-245
- YC-463, ex-YPK-4, later YF-672
- YC-467, later YFN-218
- YC-468, ex-YE-36, later YFN-240
- YC-469, ex-YE-37, later YFN-241
- YC-473, Operation Wigwam nuclear test participant, destroyed
- YC-480, later YFN-186
- YC-484, ex-YE-32, later YFN-236
- YC-485, ex-YE-33, later YFN-237
- YC-488, later YFN-226
- YC-504, later YFN-220
- YC-523, lost off Portsmouth New Hampshire 24 February 1944
- YC-537, lost due to enemy action in the Philippines 1942
- YC-623, later YFN-256
- YC-643, lost due to enemy action in the Philippines 1942
- YC-644, lost due to enemy action in the Philippines 1942
- YC-646, lost due to enemy action in the Philippines 1942
- YC-647, lost due to enemy action in the Philippines 1942
- YC-648, lost due to enemy action in the Philippines 1942
- YC-649, lost due to enemy action in the Philippines 1942
- YC-650, later YFN-540
- YC-652, lost due to enemy action in the Philippines 1942
- YC-653, lost due to enemy action in the Philippines 1942
- YC-654, lost due to enemy action in the Philippines 1942
- YC-664, lost due to enemy action at Guam December 1941
- YC-665, lost due to enemy action at Guam December 1941
- YC-666, lost due to enemy action at Guam December 1941
- YC-667, lost due to enemy action at Guam December 1941
- YC-668, lost due to enemy action at Guam December 1941
- YC-669, lost due to enemy action in the Philippines 1942
- YC-670, lost due to enemy action at Guam December 1941
- YC-671, lost due to enemy action at Guam December 1941
- YC-672, lost due to enemy action at Guam December 1941
- YC-673, lost due to enemy action at Guam December 1941
- YC-674, lost due to enemy action at Guam December 1941
- YC-683, lost due to enemy action in the Philippines 1942
- YC-685, lost due to enemy action at Guam December 1941
- YC-693, lost off Alaska February 1945
- YC-701, later YR-23
- YC-792, later YFN-1151
- YC-714 lost due to enemy action in the Philippines 1942
- YC-715 lost due to enemy action in the Philippines 1942
- YC-716 lost due to enemy action in the Philippines 1942
- YC-717 lost due to enemy action at Guam December 1941
- YC-718 lost due to enemy action at Guam December 1941
- YC-805, later YFN-1153
- YC-813, ex-YF-334
- YC-857, lost off Cape Cod Massachusetts 12 November 1943
- YC-860, later YFN-676
- YC-861, later YFN-677
- YC-862, ex-YFN-678, later YRB-10
- YC-869, lost off Imperial Beach California 23 March 1943
- YC-886, lost at Guantanamo Cuba 3 February 1943
- YC-887, lost at Guantanamo Cuba 3 February 1943
- YC-891 - sank on 18 April 1945, while under tow by the tug Mauvila (YT-328) off Key West, Florida
- YC-898, lost off Key West Florida 29 September 1942
- YC-899, lost off Key West Florida 29 September 1942
- YC-908, later YFN-1149
- YC-912, lost in the North Pacific 13 January 1945
- YC-961, lost at Biorka Island May 1945
- YC-970, lost in Puget Sound Washington 14 August 1943
- YC-1037, ex-YFN-396
- YC-1079, later YRB-22, later YR-92
- YC-1212, ex-YFN-1008
- YC-1213, ex-YFN-1009
- YC-1219, ex-YF-586
- YC-1220, ex-YF-587, later YRB-13
- YC-1272, lost near San Pedro California June 1945
- YC-1278, lost off the Atlantic coast 10 March 1943
- YC-1291, later YF-1094
- YC-1292, later YF-1095
- YC-1293, later YF-1096
- YC-1294, later YF-1097
- YC-1295, later YF-1098
- YC-1343, ex-YFN-938
- YC-1349, ex-YFN-285
- YC-1353, ex-YFN-637
- YC-1355, ex-YFN-508
- YC-1354, ex-YFN-699
- YC-1356, ex-YFN-904
- YC-1378, later YFN-1288
- YC-1461, ex-YFN-1226
- YC-1462, ex-YFN-1227
- YC-1463, ex-YFN-1228
- YC-1464, ex-YFN-1229
- YC-1498, later YPD-45,
- YC-1525, later YLC-5
- YC 1596, later YFN-1289
- YC-1680, ex-YFN-1195

The YCK hull symbol denoted a wooden barge.

- YCK-1, lost due to enemy action at Wake Island, December 1941
- YCK-2, ex-YF-422, lost 5 November 1943
- YCK-3, ex-YF-423
- YCK-4, ex-YF-424
- YCK-5, ex-YF-425
- YCK-6, ex-YF-426
- YCK-7, ex-YF-427
- YCK-8, ex-YF-428, sank 2.7 miles off Key West, Florida on 12 December 1943 while under tow by Army tug LT-4
- YCK-9, ex-YF-429
- YCK-10, ex-YF-430
- YCK-11, ex-YF-431
- YCK-12, ex-YF-432
- YCK-13, ex-YF-433
- YCK-14, ex-YF-434
- YCK-15, ex-YF-435
- YCK-16, ex-YF-436
- YCK-17, ex-YF-437
- YCK-18, ex-YF-438
- YCK-19, ex-YF-439
- YCK-20, ex-YF-440
- YCK-21, ex-YF-441
- YCK-22, ex-YF-442

== Coaling derricks (YCD) ==
- YCD-1, ex-YC-415, later YOS-1

== Car floats (YCF) ==
- YCF-5, ex-YO-37, ex-YE-14, ex-YA-18, later YFN-570
- YCF-23, lost en route to Eniwetok March 1945
- YCF-29, lost en route to Eniwetok March 1945
- YCF-36, lost en route to Eniwetok March 1945
- YCF-37, lost en route to Eniwetok March 1945
- YCF-42, lost December 1944
- YCF-59, lost off Delaware January 1945
- YCF-73, later YFN-1126
- YCF-81, later YFN-1127
- YCF-86, later YFN-1128
- YCF-87, later YFN-1129
- YCF-88, later YFN-1130
- YCF-90, later YFN-1131
- YCF-91, later YFN-1132
- YCF-92, later YFN-1133
- YCF-93, later YFN-1134
- YCF-94, later YFN-1135

== Aircraft transportation barges (YCV) ==
- YCV-6, later YFN-1093
- YCV-9, Operation Castle nuclear test participant

== Floating derricks (YD) ==
- YD-19, lost to enemy action in the Philippines
- YD-23, ex-YR-1
- YD-36, ex-YFN-72
- YD-37, later YFN-196
- YD-39, later YFN-197
- YD-43, ex-ID-3507
- YD-47, lost to enemy action in the Philippines
- YD-56, lost to enemy action in the Philippines
- YD-60, lost to enemy action in the Philippines
- YD-171, German war prize Schwimmkran nr. 1
- YD-222, ex-US Army BD 6652, later IX-533
- YD-261

== Diving tenders (YDT) ==
- YDT-4, ex-AMc-79
- YDT-6, ex-AMc-23
- YDT-7, ex-AMc-25
- YDT-11, ex-YFN-723, ex-YFNB-12, later YRST-1, IX-526, YR-94
- Phoebus (YDT-14), ex-YF-294

== Ammunition barges (YE) ==
- YE-4, later YFN-229
- YE-8, later YFN-230, lost 1942
- YE-11, later YFN-231
- YE-14, ex-YO-37, later YA-18, YCF-5, YFN-570
- YE-15, later YFN-232
- YE-16, later YFN-233
- YE-32, later YC-484, YFN-236
- YE-33, later YC-485, YFN-237
- YE-34, later YC-292, YFN-238
- YE-36, later YC-468, YFN-240
- YE-37, later YC-469, YFN-241
- YE-38, later YC-282, YFN-242
- YE-39, later YC-271, YFN-243

== Covered barges (YF, YFN) ==
YF barges are self-propelled, YFN barges are not.

Hull numbers 1 through 256 were built before World War II.

- YF-4, captured Philippines 1942
- YF-5, captured Philippines 1942
- YF-6, captured Philippines 1942
- YF-23, lost
- YFN-48, ex-YC-119
- YF-53, ex-YC-210
- YF-54, ex-YA-44
- YF-55, ex-ferry St. Helena
- YF-56, ex-YA-43
- YF-57, lost 1921
- YFN-70, ex-YC-326
- YFN-71, ex-YC-327
- YFN-72, later YD-36
- YFN-74 ex-YC-331
- YFN-75, ex-YC-332
- YFN-76, ex-YC-333
- YF-77, later YR-11
- YFN-83, ex-YC-351
- YFN-84, ex-YC-352, destroyed 1943
- YFN-85, ex-YC-353
- YFN-86, ex-YC-174, lost Philippines 1942
- YFN-87, ex-YC-446
- YFN-88, ex-YC-363
- YFN-89, ex-YC-364
- YFN-90, ex-YC-328
- YFN-91, ex-YC-329
- YFN-111, ex-YC-412
- YF-116, ex-ID-755
- YF-117, later YR-12
- YFN-131, ex-YV-26
- YFN-133, ex-YV-31
- YFN-135, ex-YV-34
- YFN-137, ex-YV-53
- YFN-138, ex-YV-60
- YFN-162, ex-YC-179
- YF-177, lost Philippines 1942
- YF-178, lost Philippines 1942
- YF-179, lost Philippines 1942
- YF-180, lost Philippines 1942
- YF-181, lost Philippines 1942
- YFN-182, ex-YS-72
- YFN-183, ex-YS-73
- YFN-184, ex-YS-75
- YFN-186, ex-YC-480
- YFN-187, ex-YC-303
- YFN-196, ex-YD-37
- YFN-197, ex-YD-39
- YFN-198, ex-YC-239
- YFN-199, ex-YC-383
- YFN-200, ex-YC-246
- YFN-208, ex-YC-275
- YFN-209, ex-YC-276
- YFN-211, ex-YC-203
- YF-212, lost due to enemy action in the Philippines 1942
- YFN-217, ex-YC-321
- YFN-218, ex-YC-467
- YFN-220, ex-YC-504
- YF-223, lost due to enemy action in the Philippines 1942
- YF-224, lost due to enemy action in the Philippines 1942
- YFN-225, ex-YC-291
- YFN-226, ex-YC-488
- YFN-229, ex-YE-4
- YFN-230, ex-YE-8, lost due to enemy action in the Philippines 1942
- YFN-231, ex-YE-11
- YFN-232, ex-YE-15
- YFN-233, ex-YE-16
- YFN-236, ex-YE-32, ex-YC-484
- YFN-237, ex-YE-33, ex-YC-485
- YFN-238, ex-YE-34, ex-YC-292
- YFN-239, later YC-280, later YRB-14
- YFN-240, ex-YE-36, ex-YC-468
- YFN-241, ex-YE-37, ex-YC-469
- YFN-242, ex-YE-38, ex-YC-282
- YFN-243, ex-YE-39, ex-YC-271
- YFN-244, ex-YC-273
- YFN-245, ex-YC-462
- YFN-246, ex-YC-285
- YFN-247, ex-YC-311
- YFN-248, ex-YC-278
- YFN-249, ex-YC-315
- YFN-250, ex-YC-261
- YFN-251, ex-YC-264
- YFN-253, ex-YC-295
- YFN-254, ex-YC-284
- YFN-255, ex-YC-305
- YFN-256, ex-YC-623

Hull numbers 257 through 1153 were built during World War II.

- YF-257, later YFRT-257
- YFN-258, later YRB-1
- YFN-268, later YFND-5, later IX-530
- YFN-271, later YRB-8
- YFN-285, later YC-1349
- YF-287, later YFRT-287
- YF-294, later Phoebus (YDT-14)
- YFN-298, later YRB-25
- YFN-310, later YRB-2
- YFN-312, later YRB-7
- YFN-317, lost due to enemy action in the Philippines 1942
- YFN-318, ex-AMC-60
- YF-331, ex-Intrepid, later YSR-42
- YFN-333, later YRR-3
- YF-334, later YC-813
- YFN-365, later YRL-5, YR-83
- YFN-373, wrecked on Tanaga Island 1946
- YF-379 through YF-391, canceled
- YFN-396, later YC-1037
- YF-401, lost 20 June 1943
- YFN-402, later YRB-17
- YFN-409, later YRB-18
- YF-411, later YFRT-411
- YF-415, exploded and sank 11 May 1944, 17 killed
- YF-418, later YFRT-418
- YF-419, later YFRT-419
- YF-422, later YCK-2
- YF-423, later YCK-3
- YF-424, later YCK-4
- YF-425, later YCK-5
- YF-426, later YCK-6
- YF-427, later YCK-7
- YF-428, later YCK-8
- YF-429, later YCK-9
- YF-430, later YCK-10
- YF-431, later YCK-11
- YF-432, later YCK-12
- YF-433, later YCK-13
- YF-434, later YCK-14
- YF-435, later YCK-15
- YF-436, later YCK-16
- YF-437, later YCK-17
- YF-438, later YCK-18
- YF-439, later YCK-19
- YF-440, later YCK-20
- YF-441, later YCK-21
- YF-442, later YCK-22
- YF-447, later YFR-447
- YF-451, later YFR-451
- YFN-462, later YFT-6
- YFN-470, later YRB-3 (sources differ)
- YFN-474, later YRB-3 (sources differ)
- YFN-475, later YRB-4
- YFN-476, destroyed 1947
- YFN-477, later YRB-5
- YFN-480, later YRB-6
- YF-487, lost in the Caribbean Sea 18 July 1943
- YFN-493, later YRB-9
- YFN-508, later YC-1355
- YFN-511, later YRB-15
- YFN-515, later YRB-19
- YFN-516, later YRB-20
- YF-519, later YFRT-519
- YF-520, later YFRT-520
- YF-523, later YNG-42
- YF-528, later YNG-43
- YFN-540, ex-YC-650
- YF-568, ex-YAG-22
- YFN-570, ex-YO-37, ex-YE-14, ex-YA-18, ex-YCF-5
- YF-575, lost off Atlantic City, New Jersey, 6 May 1943
- YF-579, lost at San Francisco, California, 20 September 1943
- YF-586, later YC-1219
- YF-587, later YC-1220, YRB-13
- YFN-589, lost
- YF-608, later APL-14
- YF-609, later APL-15
- YFN-624, later YFNB-7
- YF-628, later APL-17
- YF-629, later APL-18
- YF-630, later APL-19, sunk as target 2002
- YF-631, later APL-20
- YF-632, later APL-21
- YF-633, later APL-22
- YFN-637, later YC-1353
- YFN-653, later YFP-5
- YFN-655, later YFP-6
- YF-672, ex-YPK-4, ex-YC-463
- YFN-674, ex-YC-263, later YHB-36
- YF-675, canceled
- YFN-676, ex-YC-860
- YFN-677, ex-YC-861
- YFN-678, later YC-862, later YRB-10
- YF-681 - damaged in the 10 November 1944 explosion of USS Mount Hood (AE-11) in Seeadler Harbor at Manus Island
- YFN-685, later YRR-4, YR-89
- YFN-699, later YC-1354
- YFN-701, lost 1946
- YFN-703, lost 1946
- YFN-713, later YRB-28
- YFN-723, later YFNB-12, YDT-11, YRST-1, IX-526, YR-94
- YFN-724, lost off the Farallone Islands 22 March 1945
- YFN-725, lost off the Farallone Islands 22 March 1945
- YFN-740, later YRBM-19, YFNB-19, YRBM-56
- YF-744 - grounded at Buckner Bay, Okinawa, by Typhoon Louise in October 1945
- YFN-751, later YFNB-26, YRBM-20
- YFN-752, later YFNB-27
- YFN-753, Operation Crossroads nuclear test target, later YFNB-28
- YF-757 - sank at Buckner Bay, Okinawa, by Typhoon Louise in October 1945
- YFN-775, lost 1946
- YFN-777, lost at Eniwetok, 6 August 1945
- YFN-779, lost 1946
- YFN-780, lost 1946
- YFN-811, Project SHAD asset
- YFN-845, later YRB-21
- YF-852, later YFRT-523
- YF-853, canceled
- YF-854, later Littlehales (AGSC-15)
- YF-855 through YF-860 canceled
- YF-866, sunk as target 1988
- YFN-888, deployed to South Vietnam, sunk as target 1987
- YFN-889, deployed to South Vietnam, possibly transferred
- YFN-890, deployed to South Vietnam
- YFN-894, canceled
- YFN-895, canceled
- YFN-899, later YFNB-30, YR-93
- YFN-904, later YC-1356
- YFN-926, lost en route to Pearl Harbor, 8 March 1945
- YFN-934, Operation Castle nuclear test participant
- YFN-938, later YC-1343
- YFN-961, later YRB-16
- YFN-971, lost 1946
- YFN-975, canceled
- YFN-976, cancelled
- YFN-985, later YFP-7
- YFN-986, later YFP-8
- YFN-1007, lost 1948
- YFN-1008, later YC-1212
- YFN-1009, later YC-1213
- YF-1017 through YF-1022, canceled
- YF-1023, later YFL-25
- YF-1053, canceled
- YFN-1062, later YFNB-35, YPD-46
- YFN-1064, later YFNB-37, YRB-30
- YF-1079, ex-LST-39, ran aground and damaged at Buckner Bay, Okinawa, during Typhoon Louise in October 1945
- YF-1080, ex-YP-90
- YF-1092, later YFN-1092, YFNX-13, YRST-5, YRB-29
- YF-1094, ex-YC-1291
- YF-1095, ex-YC-1292
- YF-1096, ex-YC-1293
- YF-1097, ex-YC-1294
- YF-1098, ex-YC-1295
- YF-1099 through YF-1123, canceled
- YFN-1124, ex-sonar barge
- YFN-1125, ex-Sonar Barge
- YFN-1126, ex-YCF-73
- YFN-1127, ex-YCF-81
- YFN-1128, ex-YCF-86
- YFN-1129, ex-YCF-87
- YFN-1130, ex-YCF-88
- YFN-1131, ex-YCF-90
- YFN-1132, ex-YCF-91
- YFN-1133, ex-YCF-92
- YFN-1134, ex-YCF-93
- YFN-1135, ex-YCF-94
- YFN-1149, ex-YC-908
- YFN-1151, ex-YC-792
- YFN-1152, ex-YP-629, later YFRN-1152
- YFN-1153, ex-YC-805

Hull numbers starting with 1154 were built after World War II.

- YFN-1162, later YFP-13
- YFN-1170, later YRB-27
- YFN-1192, later YLC-1
- YFN-1195, later YC-1680
- YFN-1207, later YFP-11
- YFN-1209, later YFND-31
- YFN-1216, later YFP-12
- YFN-1226, later YC-1461
- YFN-1227, later YC-1462
- YFN-1228, later YC-1463
- YFN-1229, later YC-1464
- YFN-1253, later YFND-30
- YFN-1259, later IX-527, submarine test support barge
- YFN-1268, later YR-96
- YFN-1288, ex-YC-1378
- YFN-1289, ex-YC 1596

== Yard ferry boats or launches (YFB) ==
Two YFB vessels are currently in use at Guantanamo Bay Naval Base: Leeward (YFB-92) and Windward (YFB-93)

- Asp (YFB-1)
- Admiral Glass (YFB-2)
- Berceau (YFB-3), ex-TB-15
- Cyane (YFB-4), ex-TB-16
- Ripple (YFB-5)
- Despatch (YFB-6)
- Leslie (YFB-7)
- Navy Yard (YFB-8)
- Wave (YFB-10)
- Callao (YFB-11)
- San Felipe (YFB-12), lost due to enemy action at Luzon, Philippines
- Christine (YFB-13)
- Aquidneck (YFB-14)
- Conanicut (YFB-15)
- Manuwai (YFB-16)
- Nihoa (YFB-17)
- Monhegan (YFB-18)
- Vashon (YFB-19)
- League Island (YFB-20)
- Calistoga (YFB-21)
- Jewel (YFB-22)
- Senibeil (YFB-23)
- Treasure (YFB-24)
- Captiva (YFB-25)
- Falkner (YFB-26)
- Adak (YFB-28)
- Pilgrim II (YFB-30)
- Gould Island (YFB-31)
- Green Island (YFB-32)
- Santa Rosa (YFB-33)
- San Leandro (YFB-34)
- Sequin (YFB-35)
- Staten (YFB-36)
- Dewees (YFB-37)
- Seabrook (YFB-38)
- Calodosi (YFB-39)
- Quonset (YFB-40)
- Lillian Anne (YFB-41)
- Asquith (YFB-42)
- Colington (YFB-43)
- Royston (YFB-44)
- Sheffield (YFB-45)
- North (YFB-46)
- YFB-47
- YFB-48
- Metinic (YFB-49)
- Magdalena (YFB-54)
- Delta King (YFB-55), ex-YHB-6
- Delta Queen (YFB-56), ex-YHB-7
- San Felipe (YFB-57)
- Lacosta (YFB-58)
- Arrowsic (YFB-59)
- YFB-60
- YFB-65
- YFB-66
- San Felipe (YFB-79)
- YFB-82
- Waa Hele Honoa (YFB-83)
- YFB-84, ex-YSD-55
- YFB-86
- Moko Holo Hele (YFB-87)
- YFB-88 through YFB-91
- Leeward (YFB-92) [A], Guantanamo Bay
- Windward (YFB-93) [A], Guantanamo Bay
- YFB-94
- YFB-95
- YFB-132
- Dart (YFB-308)
- Santa Rita (YFB-681)
- Rosal (YFB-682), lost due to enemy action at Luzon, Philippines
- Camia (YFB-683), lost due to enemy action at Cavite, Luzon, Philippines
- Dapdap (YFB-684), lost due to enemy action at Luzon, Philippines
- Rivera (YFB-685), lost due to enemy action at Luzon, Philippines
- Magdalena (YFB-687), lost due to enemy action at Luzon, Philippines
- Yacal (YFB-688), lost due to enemy action at Luzon, Philippines
- Taposa (YFB-1163)
- Patchogue (YFB-1227), ex-ID-1227
- YFB-1504
- YFB-1516
- Porpoise (YFB-2047), ex-ID-2047
- YFB-2494
- Atlantic (YFB-3268), ex-ID-3268
- YFB-4753

== Yard floating drydocks (YFD) ==
All YFDs were reclassified as AFDMs in 1945 (see List of auxiliaries of the United States Navy § Medium auxiliary floating dry docks (AFDM)).

- Dewey (YFD-1), scuttled 8 April 1942 in the Philippines, raised by the Japanese and sunk again by US aircraft on 13 November 1944
- YFD-2
- YFD-3
- YFD-4
- YFD-5
- YFD-6
- YFD-7 through YFD-19
- YFD-20, lost off California 31 January 1943
- YFD-21
- YFD-22 through YFD-61
- YFD-62
- YFD-63
- YFD-64
- YFD-65
- YFD-66
- YFD-67
- YFD-68 through YFD-70
- YFD-71
- YFD-72 through YFD-82

== Large covered barges, non-self propelled (YFNB) ==
- YFNB-7, ex-YFN-624
- YFNB-12, ex-YFN-723, Operation Wigwam nuclear test participant, later YDT-11, YRST-1, IX-526, YR-94
- YFNB-13, Operation Wigwam participant
- YFNB-19, ex-YFN-740, ex-YRBM-19, later YRBM-56
- YFNB-21, later YRBM-16
- YFNB-24, later YRBM-17
- YFNB-26, ex-YFN-751, later YRBM-20
- YFNB-27, ex-YFN-752
- YFNB-28, ex-YFN-753
- YFNB-29, Operation Wigwam participant
- YFNB-30, ex-YFN-899, later YR-93
- YFNB-35, ex-YFN-1062, later YPD-46
- YFNB-37, ex-YFN-1064, later YRB-30
- YFNB-42, later YRBM-47

== Dry dock companion craft, non-self propelled (YFND) ==
- YFND-5, ex-YFN-268, later IX-530
- YFND-30, ex-YFN-1253
- YFND-31, ex-YFN-1209

== Barges, special purpose, non-self propelled (YFNX) ==
- YFNX-13, ex-YF-1092, ex-YFN-1092, later YRST-5, later YRB-29

== Floating power barges (YFP) ==
- YFP-5, ex-YFN-653
- YFP-6, ex-YFN-655
- YFP-7, ex-YFN-985
- YFP-8, ex-YFN-986
- YFP-11, ex-YFN-1207
- YFP-12, ex-YFN-1216
- YFP-13, ex-YFN-1162

== Refrigerated covered barges (YFR, YFRN) ==
YFR barges are self-propelled, YFRN barges are not.

The YFR and YFRN hull numbers are part of the YF and YFN sequence.

- YFR-443, ex-YF-443, transferred to Colombia
- YFR-447, ex-YF-447
- YFR-451, ex-YF-451, lost by explosion and fire, 14 miles northwest of Boston MA. harbor, 11 May 1944
- YFRN-833 through YFRN-841
- YFR-888 through YFR-890
- YFRN-997
- YFRN-1152, ex-YP-629, ex-YFN-1152

== Range tenders (YFRT) ==
- YFRT-257, ex-YF-257
- YFRT-287, ex-YF-287
- YFRT-411, ex-YF-411
- YFRT-418, ex-YF-418
- YFRT-419, ex-YF-419
- YFRT-519, ex-YF-519
- YFRT-520, ex-YF-520
- YFRT-523, ex-YF-852
- YFRT-524, ex-T-AG-161

== Torpedo transportation barges (YFT) ==
- YFT-6, ex-YFN-462

== Harbor utility craft (YFU) ==
Most if not all of the early YFU vessels were LCUs which had been retired from amphibious duties due to age.

YFU-71-class: 11 "Skilak" lighters purchased as Commercial off-the-shelf for the Vietnam War

- YFU-71, lead ship of class
- YFU-73, transferred to Cambodia
- YFU-78, destroyed in rocket attack, Da Nang Bridge Ramp, Vietnam, 1969, with loss of most of the crew
- YFU-79, later Baylander (IX-514), converted to a helicopter Landing Ship in 1986 for pilot training, nicknamed the "world's smallest aircraft carrier"
- YFU-81, transferred to Panama
- YFU-82, later IX-506

== Garbage barges (YG, YGN) ==
YG barges are self-propelled, YGN barges are not.

- YG-5
- YG-17, Pearl Harbor attack participant
- YG-22, lead ship of class
- YG-29
- YG-39, lost 27 September 1944
- YG-44, lost at Pearl Harbor, 7 February 1945
- YG-51
- YG-53
- YGN-70

== Houseboats (YHB) ==
- Delta King (YHB-6), later YFB-55
- Delta Queen (YHB-7), later YFB-56
- YHB-10, ex freighter Domingo Nazabel I, stationed at French Frigate Shoals August 1942 - March 1945, sunk nearby as target.
- YHB-15, later YAG-20
- YHB-17, later YAG-21
- YHB-36, ex-YC-263, ex-YFN-674

== Salvage lift craft, heavy (YHLC) ==
- Crilley (YHLC 1)
- Crandall (YHLC-2)

== Salvage lift craft (YLC) ==
- YLC-1, ex-YFN-1192
- YLC-2, ex-YC-1525

== Salvage lift craft, light (YLLC) ==
- YLLC-1, ex-LCU-1348, transferred to South Vietnam

== Dredges (YM, YMN) ==
YM dredges are self-propelled, YMN dredges are not.

- YM-2
- YM-4 lost due to enemy action in the Philippines
- YM-5, scavenged to build YM-11
- YM-11
- YM-13, captured at Guam 10 December 1941
- Sandcaster (YM-31), ex-YSD-64, to South Vietnam
- YM-37
- Seabee (YM-38)

== Mud scows (YMD) ==
- YMD-8

== Salvage lift craft medium (YMLC) ==
- YMLC-3, ex-LSM-551, ex-Salvager (ARS(D)-3)
- YMLC-4, ex-LSM-552, ex-Windlass (ARS(D)-4)

== Yard motor tugs (YMT) ==
- YMT-1 through YMT-31

== Yard net tenders (YN) ==
All specially-built yard net tenders were reclassified in 1944 as auxiliary net laying ships, see List of auxiliaries of the United States Navy § Net laying ships (AN) for the reclassification result. The 24 impressed tugboats were reclassed as Net tender tugs (YNT), later some as tugboats (YTB or YTL).

Aloe-class net laying ships

- Aloe (YN-1)
- Ash (YN-2)
- Boxwood (YN-3)
- Butternut (YN-4)
- Catalpa (YN-5)
- Chestnut (YN-6)
- Cinchona (YN-7)
- Buckeye (YN-8)
- Buckthorn (YN-9)
- Ebony (YN-10)
- Eucalyptus (YN-11)
- Chinquapin (YN-12)
- Gum Tree (YN-13)
- Holly (YN-14)
- Elder (YN-15)
- Larch (YN-16)
- Locust (YN-17)
- Mahogany (YN-18)
- Mango (YN-19)
- Hackberry (YN-20)
- Mimosa (YN-21)
- Mulberry (YN-22)
- Palm (YN-23)
- Hazel (YN-24)
- Redwood (YN-25)
- Rosewood (YN-26)
- Sandalwood (YN-27)
- Nutmeg (YN-28)
- Teaberry (YN-29)
- Teak (YN-30)
- Pepperwood (YN-31)
- Yew (YN-32)

The 24 impressed commercial tugboats.

- Hopocan (YN-33)
- Menewa (YN-34)
- Oneka (YN-35)
- Mahaska (YN-36)
- Keshena (YN-37)
- Canasatego (YN-38)
- Donacona (YN-39)
- Mankato (YN-40)
- Metea (YN-41)
- Okisko (YN-42)
- Tahchee (YN-43)
- Tamaha (YN-44)
- Wapasha (YN-45)
- Namontack (YN-46)
- Cockenoe (YN-47)
- Katlian (YN-48)
- Neswage (YN-49)
- Annawan (YN-50)
- Metacom (YN-51)
- Tamaque (YN-52)
- Marin (YN-53), ex-AMc-31
- Noka (YN-54)
- Nawat (YN-55)
- Wapello (YN-56)

Ailanthus-class net laying ships

- Ailanthus (YN-57)
- Bitterbush (YN-58)
- Anaqua (YN-59)
- Baretta (YN-60)
- Cliffrose (YN-61)
- Satinleaf (YN-62)
- Corkwood (YN-63)
- Cornel (YN-64)
- Mastic (YN-65)
- Canotia (YN-66)
- Lancewood (YN-67)
- Papaya (YN-68)
- Cinnamon (YN-69)
- Silverbell (YN-70)
- Snowbell (YN-71)
- Spicewood (YN-72)
- Manchineel (YN-73)
- Torchwood (YN-74)
- Winterberry (YN-75)
- Viburnum (YN-76)
- Abele (YN-77)
- Terebinth (YN-78)
- Precept (YN-79)
- Boxelder (YN-80)
- Catclaw (YN-81)
- Chinaberry (YN-82)
- Hoptree (YN-83)
- Whitewood (YN-84)
- Palo Blanco (YN-85)
- Palo Verde (YN-86)
- Pinon (YN-87)
- Prefect (YN-88)
- Satinwood (YN-89)
- Seagrape (YN-90)
- Shellbark (YN-91)
- Silverleaf (YN-92)
- Stagbush (YN-93)
- Allthorn (YN-94)
- Tesota (YN-95)
- Yaupon (YN-96)

Cohoes-class net laying ships

- Cohoes (YN-97)
- Etlah (YN-98)
- Suncook (YN-99)
- Manayunk (YN-100)
- Marietta (YN-101)
- Nahant (YN-102)
- Naubuc (YN-109)
- Oneota (YN-110)
- Passaconaway (YN-111)
- Passaic (YN-113)
- Shakamaxon (YN-114)
- Tonawanda (YN-115)
- Tunxis (YN-119)
- Waxsaw (YN-120)
- Yazoo (YN-121)

== Net gate craft (YNG) ==
- YNG-1
- YNG-20, ex-AM-17
- YNG-42, ex-YF-523
- YNG-43, ex-YF-528

== Net tender tugs (YNT) ==
All these ships were former Yard net tenders (YN)

- Hopocan (YNT-1)
- Menewa (YNT-2)
- Oneka (YNT-3)
- Mahaska (YNT-4)
- Keshena (YNT-5)
- Canasatego (YNT-6)
- Donacona (YNT-7)
- Mankato (YNT-8)
- Metea (YNT-9)
- Okisko (YNT-10), later YTL-735
- Nawat (YNT-11)
- Tamaha (YNT-12)
- Wapasha (YNT-13), later YTB-737
- Namontack (YNT-14), later YTB-738
- Cockenoe (YNT-15)
- Katlian (YNT-16)
- Neswage (YNT-17)
- Annawan (YNT-18)
- Metacom (YNT-19)
- Tamaque (YNT-20)
- Marin (YNT-21)
- Noka (YNT-22)
- Nawat (YNT-23)
- Wapello (YNT-24)

== Fuel oil barges (YO, YON) ==
YO barges are self-propelled, YON barges are not.

- YO-10, ex-YW-2, later YR-19
- YO-37, later YE-14, YA-18, YCF-5, YFN-570
- YO-41 - sank 22 February 1942 during enemy action in the Philippines
- YO-42 - sank 22 February 1942 during enemy action in the Philippines
- YO-61, Operation Castle nuclear test participant
- USS Syncline (YO-63) - sank in 1972 north of Tahiti
- YO-64 - sank due to enemy action in the Philippines in January 1942
- YO-77 - damaged in the 10 November 1944 explosion of USS Mount Hood (AE-11) in Seeadler Harbor at Manus Island
- YO-120, Operation Castle participant
- YO-146 - sank in accident July 1957
- YO-156 - lost at Sitka, Alaska, in May 1945
- YO-157 - lost at Sitka, Alaska in May 1945
- YO-159 - torpedoed and damaged 250 nautical miles (460 km) east of Espiritu Santo by Ro-42 on 14 January 1944, scuttled the following day by USS PC-1138
- YON-160 - Operation Crossroads nuclear test target
- YO-161 - sank at Eniwetok 29 November 1946
- YON-184 - sank at Eniwetok in a typhoon in September 1946
- YO-185 - sank off Saipan 16 March 1946
- YO-186 - sank off Guam 5 April 1948
- YON-187, later YWN-148
- YO-196, ex-YOGN-196
- YO-199 - Operation Crossroads participant
- YON-252, ex-YOGN-123
- YON-367, ex-YOGN-119

== Gasoline barges (YOG, YOGN) ==
YOG barges are self-propelled, YOGN barges are not.

- YOG-32, later YWN-157
- YOG-33, transferred to South Vietnam
- YOG-42 - under tow by USS Navajo (AT-64) when Navajo was torpedoed and sunk by Japanese submarine I-39 on 12 September 1943, 150 miles East of Espiritu Santo, recovered by USS Sioux (AT-75), later YOGN-42, intentionally beached on Lanai, Hawaiian Islands in 1950
- YOG-56, transferred to South Vietnam
- YOG-63, Operation Crossroads participant
- YOG-66, transferred to South Vietnam
- YOG-71, transferred to South Vietnam
- YOG-76 - sank on 13 November 1969 in Cua Viet Cove, South Vietnam after two underwater explosions hit her, refloated and taken to Da Nang, South Vietnam, not repaired due to severe damage
- YOGN-82, Operation Castle participant
- YOG-80, transferred to South Vietnam
- YOG-83 - Operation Crossroads nuclear test target, sunk off Kwajalein 16 September 1948
- YOG-84 - lost during typhoon at sea off Saipan 14 November 1948
- YOG-93, later IX-523 (training hulk for boarding party tactics)
- YOGN-116, later YWN-156
- YOGN-119, later YON-367
- YOGN-123, later YON-252
- YOGN-125, ex-YWN-154, later YON
- YOG-131, transferred to South Vietnam
- YOGN-196, later YO-196

== Oil storage barges (YOS) ==
- YOS-1, ex-YC-415, ex-YCD-1

== Patrol craft (YP) ==
- YP-3, ex-USS Sanda
- USS Milan (YP-6), ex-WCG-209
- YP-10, ex-CG-194
- YP-15, ex-CG-149
- YP-16, ex-CG-267, destroyed 10 December 1941 at Guam
- YP-17, ex-CG-275, captured 10 December 1941 at Guam
- YP-18, ex-CG-263
- YP-19, ex-CG-177
- YP-26, ex-CG-252, destroyed by an explosion in 1942 while beached in a shipyard in the Panama Canal Zone
- YP-29, ex-CG-116
- YP-45, ex-CG-133
- YP-49, ex-CG-182
- YP-51, ex-CG-261

During World War II many private fishing and United States Fish & Wildlife Service (US FWS) vessels were pressed into naval service as patrol craft. A small number would be modified for delivering refrigerated food to small isolated island bases, most without any reclassification.

- YP-72, ex-Cavalcade, wrecked in Kuluk Bay, Alaska on 17 February 1943
- YP-73, ex-Corsair, wrecked in Kodiak, Alaska, on 15 January 1945, 10 killed
- YP-74, ex-Endeavor, sunk in collision off Unimak Island, Alaska on 6 September 1942, 4 killed
- YP-77, ex-PC-528
- YP-90, later YF-1080
- YP-105, ex-PC-510
- YP-148, ex-Western Queen
- YP-150, later AMc-149, IX-177
- YP-152, ex-Western Traveler
- YP-153, ex-Waldero
- YP-155, ex-Storm
- YP-179, ex-SP-179
- YP-198, ex-SP-588, ex-US FWS Eider
- YP-199, ex-US FWS Kittiwake
- YP-200, ex-SP-624, ex-US FWS Widgeon
- YP-239 - wrecked at Buckner Bay, Okinawa, by Typhoon Louise in October 1945
- YP-214, ex-SP-214
- YP-251, ex-Foremost
- YP-258, later PYc-30
- YP-278, ex-Liberty, small refrigerated cargo vessel
- YP-279, ex-Navigator, foundered in heavy weather off Townsville, Australia, on 5 September 1943
- YP-284, ex-Endeavor, sunk by Japanese destroyers off Guadalcanal on 25 October 1942, 1 killed
- YP-289 - wrecked at Buckner Bay, Okinawa, by Typhoon Louise in October 1945
- YP-290, ex-Picoroto
- YP-345, ex-Yankee, disappeared between French Frigate Shoals and Midway Island on 31 October 1942, 17 killed
- YP-346, ex-Prospect, damaged and beached by Japanese 9 September 1942, destroyed 10 September 1942, 1 killed
- YP-375, ex-AMb-17, later IX-199
- YP-389, ex-Cohasset, ex-AMc-202, sunk by U-701 near Diamond Shoals on 19 June 1942, 6 killed
- YP-399, ex-Big Dipper
- YP-400
- YP-422, ex-Mist, briefly commanded by L. Ron Hubbard
- YP-425 Brave, ex-PYc-34
- YP-448 - later IX-200
- YP-449 - later IX-201
- YP-506, ex-ID-1217
- YP-617 - small refrigerated cargo vessel
- YP-618 - small refrigerated cargo vessel
- YP-629, later YFN-1152, YFRN-1152
- YP-636 - Operation Crossroads participant, later US FWS Henry O'Malley
- YP-663, ex-SP-663 (duplicate number from after WWI)
- YP-714, ex-SP-714 (duplicate number from after WWI)

Later purpose-built yard patrol craft would be assigned mainly to train US Naval Academy and US Merchant Marine Academy midshipmen.

- YP-654 through YP-675
- YP-676 through YP-682
- YP-683 through YP-702
- YP-703 through YP-708

== Floating pile drivers (YPD) ==
- YPD-22, lost due to enemy action in the Philippines
- YPD-36
- YPD-37, ex-YSD-61
- YPD-45, ex-YC-1498
- YPD-46, ex-YFN-1062, ex-YFNB-35

== Pontoon storage barges (YPK) ==
- YPK-4, later YC-463, YF-672
- YPK-6, lost due to enemy action in the Philippines
- YPK-7, lost due to enemy action in the Philippines

== Floating workshops (YR) ==
Four floating workshops were transferred to the Soviet Union (USSR) in 1945 under Project Hula, hull numbers unknown.

- YR-1, later YD-23
- YR-2
- YR-3
- YR-4, reported missing
- YR-5, ex-YC-164
- YR-6
- YR-7
- YR-8, ex-YC-455
- YR-9, ex-YC-456
- YR-10
- YR-11, ex-YF-77
- YR-12, ex-YF-117
- YR-13 through YR-18
- YR-19, ex-YW-2, ex-YO-10
- YR-20, ex-YC-274
- YR-21, ex-YC-294
- YR-22, ex-YC-296
- YR-23, ex-YC-701
- YR-24
- YR-25
- YR-26, ex-YRR-5
- YR-27 through YR-30
- YR-31, later YRR-7, later YR-90
- YR-32, later YRR-8
- YR-33 through YR-35
- YR-36, later YRB-31, later YRBM-54
- YR-37
- YR-38
- YR-39, later YRR-6
- YR-40
- YR-41
- YR-42, ex-YTT-3
- YR-43, lost in the Gulf of Alaska, 28 March 1945
- YR-44, later YRBM-48
- YR-45
- YR-46, later YRBM-49
- YR-47
- YR-48
- YR-49, later YRR-1
- YR-50, later YRBM-50
- YR-51
- YR-52, later YRDM-1
- YR-53, later YRDM-2
- YR-54, later YRDM-3, YRR-13
- YR-55, later YRDH-1, later IX-528 submarine test support barge
- YR-56, later YRDH-2
- YR-57, later YRDH-3, later YRR-11
- YR-58
- YR-59
- YR-60, later YRBM-51
- YR-61
- YR-62
- YR-63, later YRB-36
- YR-64 through YR-66
- YR-67, later YRB-32
- YR-68, later YRB-34
- YR-69 through YR-72
- YR-73, later YRB-33
- YR-74, later YRR-2
- YR-75
- YR-76
- YR-77, later YRBM-52
- YR-78, later YRB-35, later YRBM-55
- YR-79, later YRR-10
- YR-80, canceled
- YR-81, canceled
- YR-82, canceled
- YR-83, ex-YFN-365, ex-YRL-5
- YR-84, ex-FMS 6
- YR-85, ex-FMS 387
- YR-86, ex-FMS 811
- YR-87
- YR-88, ex-YR 32, YRR 8
- YR-89, ex-YFN-685, ex-YRR-4
- YR-90, ex-YR-31, ex-YRR-7
- YR-91, later YRBM-53
- YR-92, ex-YC-1079, ex-YRB-22
- YR-93, ex-YFN-899, ex-YFNB-30
- YR-94, ex-YFN-723, ex-YFNB-12, ex-YDT-11, ex-YRST-1, ex-IX-526
- YR-95, ex-Nestucca
- YR-96, ex-YFN-1268

== Repair and berthing barges (YRB) ==
- YRB-1, ex-YFN-258
- YRB-2, ex-YFN-310
- YRB-3, ex-YFN-470 or ex-YFN-474 (sources differ)
- YRB-4, ex-YFN-475
- YRB-5, ex-YFN-477
- YRB-6, ex-YFN-480
- YRB-7, ex-YFN-312
- YRB-8, ex-YFN-271
- YRB-9, ex-YFN-493
- YRB-10, ex-YFN-678, ex-YC-862
- YRB-11, ex-YC-293
- YRB-12, ex-YC-312
- YRB-13, ex-YF-587, ex-YC-1220
- YRB-14, ex-YFN-239, ex-YC-280
- YRB-15, ex-YFN-511
- YRB-16, ex-YFN-961
- YRB-17, ex-YFN-402
- YRB-18, ex-YFN-409
- YRB-19, ex-YFN-515
- YRB-20, ex-YFN-516
- YRB-21, ex-YFN-845
- YRB-22, ex-YC-1079, later YR-92
- YRB-23
- YRB-24
- YRB-25, ex-YFN-298
- YRB-26
- YRB-27, ex-YFN-1170
- YRB-28, ex-YFN-713
- YRB-29, ex-YF-1092, ex-YFN-1092, ex-YFNX-13, ex-YRST-5
- YRB-30, ex-YFN-1064, ex-YFNB-37
- YRB-31, ex-YR-36, later YRBM-54
- YRB-32, ex-YR-67
- YRB-33, ex-YR-73
- YRB-34, ex-YR-68
- YRB-35, ex-YR-78, later YRBM-55
- YRB-36, ex-YR-63

== Repair, berthing and messing barges (YRBM) ==
- YRBM-1 through YRBM-15
- YRBM-16, ex-YFNB-21, transferred to South Vietnam
- YRBM-17, ex-YFNB-24
- YRBM-18, ex-APL-55
- YRBM-19, ex-YFN-740, later YFNB-19, YRBM-56
- YRBM-20, ex-YFN-751, YFNB-26
- YRBM-21 through YRBM-46
- YRBM-47, ex-YFNB-42
- YRBM-48, ex-YR-44
- YRBM-49, ex-YR-46
- YRBM-50, ex-YR-50
- YRBM-51, ex-YR-60
- YRBM-52, ex-YR-77
- YRBM-53, ex-YR-91
- YRBM-54, ex-YR-36, ex-YRB-31
- YRBM-55, ex-YR-78, ex-YRB-35
- YRBM-56, ex-YFN-740, ex-YRBM-19, ex-YFNB-19

== Submarine rescue chambers (YRC) ==
- YRC-4, lost due to enemy action in the Philippines

== Floating dry dock workshops, hull (YRDH) ==
- YRDH-1, ex-YR-55, later IX-528 submarine test support barge
- YRDH-2, ex-YR-56
- YRDH-3, ex-YR-57, later YRR-11
- YRDH-4, later YRR-12
- YRDH-5 through YRDH-8

== Floating dry dock workshops, machine (YRDM) ==
- YRDM-1, ex-YR-52
- YRDM-2, ex-YR-53
- YRDM-3, ex-YR-54, later YRR-13
- YRDM-4, later YRR-14
- YRDM-5 through YRDM-7
- YRDM-8, later YRR-5

== Covered barges repair (YRL) ==
- YRL-5, ex-YFN-365, later YR-83

== Radiological repair barges (YRR) ==
- YRR-1, ex-YR-49
- YRR-2, ex-YR-74
- YRR-3, ex-YFN-333
- YRR-4, ex-YFN-685, later YR-89
- YRR-5, ex-YRDM-8
- YRR-6, ex-YR-39
- YRR-7, ex-YR-31, later YR-90
- YRR-8, ex-YR-32, ex-YR-88
- YRR-9
- YRR-10, ex-YR-79
- YRR-11, ex-YR-57, ex-YRDH-3
- YRR-12, ex-YRDH-4
- YRR-13, ex-YR-54, ex-YRDM-3
- YRR-14, ex-YRDM-4

== Salvage craft tenders (YRST) ==
- YRST-1, ex-YFN-723, ex-YFNB-12, ex-YDT-11, later IX-526, later YR-94
- YRST-5, ex-YF-1092, ex-YFN-1092, ex-YFNX-13, later YRB-29

== Stevedoring barges (YS) ==
- YS-72, later YFN-182
- YS-73, later YFN-183
- YS-75, later YFN-184
- YS-88
- YS-110

== Yard seaplane derricks (YSD) ==
- YSD-1
- YSD-2
- YSD-4
- YSD-6
- YSD-7 through YSD-10

YSD-11-class crane ship

- YSD-11 through YSD-13
- YSD-15 through YSD-18
- YSD-19, one battle star for WW2
- YSD-20, foundered in Gulf of Mexico 3 August 1963
- YSD-21 through YSD-27
- YSD-29
- YSD-30, foundered under tow from Palmyra Island 8 December 1946
- YSD-31
- YSD-32, later YSR-8
- YSD-33
- YSD-34
- YSD-35, lost 16 May 1946
- YSD-36, lost off Okinawa 9 August 1946
- YSD-37, lost off Eniwetok 10 December 1946
- YSD-42, lost off Guam May 1976
- YSD-43, lost off Eniwetok October 1946
- YSD-44 through YSD-47
- YSD-48, lost at Okinawa 9 October 1945 from Typhoon Louise
- YSD-49
- YSD-50
- YSD-55, later YFB-84
- YSD-59
- YSD-60
- YSD-61, later YPD-37
- YSD-62
- YSD-63
- YSD-64, later YM-31
- YSD-65 through YSD-78

== Salvage barges (YSP) ==
- YSP-44 - sunk 22 February 1942 during enemy action in the Philippines
- YSP-46 through YSP-50 - all sunk 22 February 1942 during enemy action in the Philippines

== Sludge removal barges (YSR) ==
- YSR-2 - sunk 22 February 1942 during enemy action in the Philippines
- YSR-8, ex-YSD-32
- YSR-42, ex-Intrepid, ex-YF-331

== Yard tugs (YT) ==
Many of these tugs were later assigned YTB, YTL, or YTM classifications.

- Wahneta (YT-1)
- Iwana (YT-2)
- Narkeeta (YT-3)
- Unadilla (YT-4)
- Samoset (YT-5)
- Penacook (YT-6)
- Pawtucket (YT-7)
- Pentucket (YT-8)
- Sotoyomo (YT-9)
- Triton (YT-10)
- Fortune (YT-11)
- Cayuga (YT-12)
- Hercules (YT-13)
- Lively (YT-14)
- Massasoit (YT-15)
- Modoc (YT-16)
- Mohawk (YT-17)
- Nottoway (YT-18)
- Nyack (YT-19)
- Passaic (YT-20)
- Pawnee (YT-21)
- Rocket (YT-22)
- Sebago (YT-23)
- Tecumseh (YT-24)
- Vigilant (YT-25)
- Wicomico (YT-26)
- Wompatuck (YT-27)
- Advance (YT-28), ex-ID-3057
- Barnett (YT-29)
- Bouker No. 2 (YT-30), ex-SP-1275
- Saco (YT-31), ex-SP-2725
- Catawba (YT-32)
- Mendota (YT-33), ex-SP-773
- Dreadnaught (YT-34)
- Nausett (YT-35)
- Choptank (YT-36)
- Yuma (YT-37)
- John L. Lawrence (YT-38)
- Navigator (YT-39)
- Nonpareil (YT-40)
- Chase S. Osborne (YT-41)
- Penobscot (YT-42), ex-SP-982, later YTB-42
- Pocomoke (YT-43)
- Adirondack (YT-44)
- James Wooley (YT-45)
- YT-46 through YT-85
- YT-86 through YT-101
- Alida (YT-102)
- Balanga (YT-103)
- Banaag (YT-104), lost due to enemy action in the Philippines
- Barcelo (YT-105)
- Christine (YT-106)
- Iona (YT-107), sunk by Japanese aircraft at Cavite, Luzon, Philippine Islands, 2 January 1942
- Mercedes (YT-108), destroyed to prevent capture at Cavite, Luzon, Philippine Islands, 2 January 1942
- Peoria (YT-109)
- Uncas (YT-110), ex-AT-51
- YT-111
- Active (YT-112)
- Diligent (YT-113)
- Choctaw (YT-114)
- Reindeer (YT-115)
- Vaga (YT-116), scuttled to prevent capture off Corregidor, Luzon, Philippine Islands, 5 May 1942
- YT-117
- YT-118
- Geronimo (YT-119)
- Stallion (YT-120)
- Arapaho (YT-121)
- Tillamook (YT-122)
- Wando (YT-123), ex-AT-17, later YTB-123
- Chemung (YT-124), ex-AT-18
- Undaunted (YT-125)
- Challenge (YT-126), ex-SP-1015, ex-AT-59, later YTM-126
- Patriot (YT-127)
- Powhatan (YT-128)
- Osceola (YT-129)
- YT-130
- USS Massasoit (YT-131)
- YT-132
- Narkeeta (YT-133)
- Wahneta (YT-134)
- Cahokia (YT-135)
- Tamaroa (YT-136), ex-AT-62, later YTB-136
- J. M. Woodworth (YT-137)
- Woban (YT-138)
- Ala (YT-139)
- Wahtah (YT-140)
- Heekon (YT-141)
- Nokomis (YT-142)
- YT-143
- YT-144
- Montezuma (YT-145)
- Hoga (YT-146)
- Tazhia (YT-147)
- Wenonah (YT-148)
- Toka (YT-149)
- Woyot (YT-150)
- Konoka (YT-151)
- YT-152 through YT-169
- Alloway (YT-170)
- Yaquima (YT-171)
- Sparrow (YT-172)
- Manistee (YT-173)
- Allaquippa (YT-174)
- Chekilli (YT-175)
- Junaluska (YT-176)
- Black Fox (YT-177)
- Dekaury (YT-178)
- Lone Wolf (YT-179)
- Madokawando (YT-180)
- Mazapeta (YT-181)
- Mawkaw (YT-182)
- YT-184 through YT-186
- Canonicus (YT-187)
- Negwagon (YT-188)
- Nepanet (YT-189)
- Orono (YT-190)
- Osamekin (YT-191)
- Pessacus (YT-192)
- Sassacus (YT-193)
- Squanto (YT-194)
- Yonaguska (YT-195)
- YT-196
- YT-197
- YT-198, sunk off Anzio, Italy, 18 February 1944
- YT-199 through YT-213
- Cahto (YT-215)
- Cochise (YT-216)
- Ensenore (YT-217)
- Achigan (YT-218)
- Hatak (YT-219)
- Iona (YT-220)
- Kabout (YT-221)
- Kasota (YT-222)
- Mahackemo (YT-223)
- Manada (YT-224)
- Maquinna (YT-225)
- Chaska (YT-226)
- Alamingo (YT-227)
- Alamuchee (YT-228)
- Alarka (YT-229)
- YT-230 through YT-237
- Bomazeen (YT-238)
- YT-239
- YT-240
- Uncas (YT-242)
- YT-243 through YT-245
- Tavibo (YT-246)
- YT-247, sunk 5 April 1944
- YT-248 through YT-251
- Dekanisora (YT-252)
- Anacot (YT-253)
- Menatonon (YT-254)
- Kennesaw (YT-255)
- Menoquet (YT-256)
- Minooka (YT-257)
- Moanahonga (YT-258)
- Arivaca (YT-259)
- Nasomee (YT-260)
- Nawona (YT-261)
- Oneyana (YT-262)
- Neoga (YT-263)
- Awatobi (YT-264)
- Hiawatha (YT-265)
- Pocahontas (YT-266)
- Pogatacut (YT-267)
- Red Cloud (YT-268)
- Sakarissa (YT-269)
- Satanta (YT-270)
- Minnehaha (YT-271)
- Iwana (YT-272)
- Tecumseh (YT-273)
- Pokagon (YT-274)
- Epanow (YT-275)
- Tavibo (YT-276)
- Onockatin (YT-277)
- Ossahinta (YT-278)
- Penacook (YT-279)
- Tuscola (YT-280)
- Peshewah (YT-281)
- Piomingo (YT-282)
- Pitchlynn (YT-283)
- Neokautah (YT-284)
- Poquim (YT-285)
- Quinnapin (YT-286)
- Sabeata (YT-287)
- Sagaunash (YT-288)
- Sakaweston (YT-289)
- Canocan (YT-290)
- YT-291 through YT-324
- Mamo (YT-325)
- Sacagawea (YT-326)
- Haiglar (YT-327)
- Mauvila (YT-328)
- YT-330
- Namequa (YT-331)
- YT-332
- YT-333
- Dekanawida (YT-334)
- Dohasan (YT-335)
- Skenandoa (YT-336)
- Wampatuck (YT-337)
- Nesutan (YT-338)
- YT-339
- YT-340
- Tuscarora (YT-341)
- YT-342
- Swatane (YT-344)
- YT-345
- YT-346
- Oratamin (YT-347)
- YT-348
- Neomonni (YT-349)
- YT-351 through YT-353
- Corbitant (YT-354)
- YT-355 through YT-358
- Pawtucket (YT-359)
- YT-360 through YT-363
- Sassaba (YT-364)
- Segwarusa (YT-365)
- Waubansee (YT-366)
- Wawasee (YT-367)
- Shahaka YT-368, sunk after collision with ABSD-2 during transit from California to Pearl Harbor, Hawaii, 9 May 1944
- Shamokin (YT-369)
- Skandawati (YT-370)
- Smohalla (YT-371)
- Tatarrax (YT-372)
- Topenebee (YT-373)
- Vaga (YT-374)
- Oconostota (YT-375)
- Winnetka (YT-376)
- Candoto (YT-377)
- Chicomico (YT-378)
- Canuck (YT-379)
- Chanagi (YT-380)
- Chepanoc (YT-381)
- Coatopa (YT-382)
- Cochali (YT-383)
- Waneta (YT-384)
- Wannalancet (YT-385)
- Washakie (YT-386)
- Watseka (YT-387)
- Connewango (YT-388)
- Conohasset (YT-389)
- Ganadoga (YT-390)
- Itara (YT-391)
- Mecosta (YT-392)
- Nakarna (YT-393)
- Winamac (YT-394)
- Wingina (YT-395)
- Wovoka (YT-396)
- Yanegua (YT-397)
- Netakhi (YT-398)
- Numa (YT-399)
- Otokomi (YT-400)
- Owachomo (YT-401)
- Panameta (YT-402)
- Pitamakan (YT-403)
- Coshecton (YT-404)
- Cusseta (YT-405)
- Kittaton (YT-406)
- Lonoto (YT-407)
- Minniska (YT-408)
- Anamosa (YT-409)
- Allamakee (YT-410)
- Ponkabia (YT-411)
- Conchardee (YT-412)
- Portobago (YT-413)
- Satago (YT-414)
- Secota (YT-415)
- Sonnicant (YT-416)
- Taconnet (YT-417)
- Tensaw (YT-418)
- Topawa (YT-419)
- Wallacut (YT-420)
- Windigo (YT-421)
- YT-422
- YT-427
- YT-428
- YT-431
- YT-432
- YT-434 through YT-436
- YT-438
- YT-440 through YT-445
- YT-448
- YT-451
- YT-452
- YT-454 through YT-457
- Resolute (YT-458)/Evea (YT-458)
- Edenshaw (YT-459)
- Kiasutha (YT-463)
- Shabonee (YT-465)
- Chipola (YT-466)
- YT-482
- YT-718

Manhattan-class ex-Natick-class

- Manhattan (YT-800), ex-YTB-779 [A]
- Washtucna (YT-801), ex-YTB-826 [A]

Valiant-class

- Valiant (YT-802) [A]
- Reliant (YT-803) [A]
- Defiant (YT-804) [A]
- Seminole (YT-805) [A]
- Puyallup (YT-806) [A]
- Menominee (YT-807) [A]

Rainier-class

- Rainier (YT-808) [A]
- Agamenticus (YT-809) [A]
- Deception (YT-810) [A]
- Olympus (YT-811) [A]
- Baker (YT-812) [A]
- Sentinel (YT-813) [A]

== Large harbor tugs (YTB) ==
- Navigator (YTB-39)
- Penobscot (YTB-42)
- Wando (YTB-123)
- Osceola (YTB-129)
- Cahokia (YTB-135)
- Tamaroa (YTB-136), ex-AT-62, YT-136, sunk in collision 27 January 1946
- Woban (YTB-138)
- Ala (YTB-139)
- Wahtah (YTB-140)
- Heekon (YTB-141)
- Nokomis (YTB-142)
- Montezuma (YTB-145)
- Hoga (YTB-146)
- Tazhia (YTB-147)
- Wenonah (YTB-148)
- Toka (YTB-149)
- Woyot (YTB-150)
- Konoka (YTB-151)
- Yaquima (YTB-171)
- Manistee (YTB-173)
- Allaquippa (YTB-174)
- Chekilli (YTB-175)
- Junaluska (YTB-176)
- Black Fox (YTB-177)
- Dekaury (YTB-178)
- Lone Wolf (YTB-179)
- Madokawando (YTB-180)
- Mazapeta (YTB-181)
- Mawkaw (YTB-182)
- Negwagon (YTB-188)
- Nepanet (YTB-189)
- Orono (YTB-190)
- Osamekin (YTB-191)
- Pessacus (YTB-192)
- Sassacus (YTB-193)
- Squanto (YTB-194)
- Yonaguska (YTB-195)
- Cahto (YTB-215)
- Cochise (YTB-216)
- Ensenore (YTB-217)
- Achigan (YTB-218)
- Hatak (YTB-219)
- Iona (YTB-220)
- Kabout (YTB-221)
- Kasota (YTB-222)
- Mahackemo (YTB-223)
- Manada (YTB-224)
- Maquinna (YTB-225)
- Chaska (YTB-226)
- Alamingo (YTB-227)
- Alamuchee (YTB-228)
- Alarka (YTB-229)
- Bomazeen (YTB-238)
- Uncas (YTB-242)
- Tavibo (YTB-246)
- Dekanisora (YTB-252)
- Anacot (YTB-253)
- Menatonon (YTB-254)
- Kennesaw (YTB-255)
- Menoquet (YTB-256)
- Minooka (YTB-257)
- Moanahonga (YTB-258)
- Arivaca (YTB-259)
- Nasomee (YTB-260)
- Nawona (YTB-261)
- Oneyana (YTB-262)
- Neoga (YTB-263)
- Awatobi (YTB-264)
- Hiawatha (YTB-265)
- Pocahontas (YTB-266)
- Pogatacut (YTB-267)
- Red Cloud (YTB-268)
- Sakarissa (YTB-269)
- Satanta (YTB-270)
- Minnehaha (YTB-271)
- Iwana (YTB-272)
- Tecumseh (YTB-273)
- Pokagon (YTB-274)
- Epanow (YTB-275)
- Tavibo (YTB-276)
- Onockatin (YTB-277)
- Ossahinta (YTB-278)
- Penacook (YTB-279)
- Tuscola (YTB-280)
- Peshawah (YTB-281)
- Piomingo (YTB-282)
- Pitchlynn (YTB-283)
- Neokautah (YTB-284)
- Poquim (YTB-285)
- Quinnapin (YTB-286)
- Sabeata (YTB-287)
- Saguanash (YTB-288)
- Sakaweston (YTB-289)
- Canocan (YTB-290)
- Mamo (YTB-325)
- Haiglar (YTB-327)
- Mauvila (YTB-328)
- Namequa (YTB-331)
- YTB-332
- Dekanawida (YTB-334)
- Dohasan (YTB-335)
- Wampatuck (YTB-337)
- Nesutan (YTB-338)
- Tuscarora (YTB-341)
- Swatane (YTB-344)
- Oratamin (YTB-347)
- Pawtucket (YTB-359)
- Sassaba (YTB-364)
- Segwarusa (YTB-365)
- Waubansee (YTB-366)
- Wawasee (YTB-367)
- Shahaka (YTB-368)
- Shamokin (YTB-369)
- Skandawati (YTB-370)
- Smohalla (YTB-371)
- Tatarrax (YTB-372)
- Topenebee (YTB-373)
- Vaga (YTB-374)
- Oconostota (YTB-375)
- Winnetka (YTB-376)
- Candoto (YTB-377)
- Chicomico (YTB-378)
- Canuck (YTB-379)
- Chanagi (YTB-380)
- Chepanoc (YTB-381)
- Coatopa (YTB-382)
- Cochali (YTB-383)
- Waneta (YTB-384)
- Wannalancet (YTB-385)
- Washakie (YTB-386)
- Watseka (YTB-387)
- Connewango (YTB-388)
- Conohasset (YTB-389)
- Ganadoga (YTB-390)
- Itara (YTB-391)
- Mecosta (YTB-392)
- Nakarna (YTB-393)
- Winimac (YTB-394)
- Wingina (YTB-395)
- Wovoka (YTB-396)
- Yanegua (YTB-397)
- Natahki (YTB-398)
- Numa (YTB-399)
- Otokomi (YTB-400)
- Owachomo (YTB-401)
- Panameta (YTB-402)
- Pitamakan (YTB-403)
- Coshecton (YTB-404)
- Cusseta (YTB-405)
- Kittaton (YTB-406)
- Lonoto (YTB-407)
- Minniska (YTB-408)
- Anamosa (YTB-409)
- Allamakee (YTB-410)
- Ponkabia (YTB-411)
- Conchardee (YTB-412)
- Portobago (YTB-413)
- Satago (YTB-414)
- Secota (YTB-415)
- Sonnicant (YTB-416)
- Taconnet (YTB-417)
- Tensaw (YTB-418)
- Topawa (YTB-419)
- Wallacut (YTB-420)
- Windigo (YTB-421)
- Evea (YTB-458)
- Edenshaw (YTB-459)
- Kiasutha (YTB-463)
- Shabonee (YTB-465)
- Chipola (YTB-466)
- YTB-492
- Abinago (YTB-493)
- Alnaba (YTB-494)
- Barboncito (YTB-495)
- Chahao (YTB-496)
- Tlingit (YTB-497)
- Cholocco (YTB-498)
- Chiquito (YTB-499)
- Chohonaga (YTB-500)
- Ankachak (YTB-501)
- Apohola (YTB-502)
- Atanus (YTB-503)
- Ayanabi (YTB-504)
- Bocachee (YTB-505)
- Hombro (YTB-506)
- Mimac (YTB-507)
- Nootka (YTB-508)
- Makah (YTB-509)
- Chilkat (YTB-510)
- Carascan (YTB-511)
- Hastwiana (YTB-512)
- Hiamonee (YTB-513)
- Lelaka (YTB-514)
- Oswegatchie (YTB-515)
- Pocasset (YTB-516)
- Pokanoket (YTB-517)
- Hisada (YTB-518)
- Mahoa (YTB-519)
- Nacheninga (YTB-520)
- Nabigwon (YTB-521)
- Sagawamick (YTB-522)
- Senasqua (YTB-523)
- Tutahaco (YTB-524)
- Wabanquot (YTB-525)
- Wahaka (YTB-526)
- Wahpeton (YTB-527)
- Wakonda (YTB-528)
- Wickawee (YTB-529)
- Aranca (YTB-530)
- Yapashi (YTB-531)
- Ocmulgee (YTB-532)
- Shahaska (YTB-533)
- Nadli (YTB-534)
- Nahasho (YTB-535)
- Nahoke (YTB-536)
- Nanigo (YTB-537)
- Nashel (YTB-538)
- Sikis (YTB-539)
- Quileute (YTB-540)
- Ozette (YTB-541)
- Chegodega (YTB-542)
- Etawina (YTB-543)
- Yatanocas (YTB-544)
- Accohanoc (YTB-545)
- Takos (YTB-546)
- Yanaba (YTB-547)
- Matunak (YTB-548)
- Migadan (YTB-549)
- Acoma (YTB-701)
- Arawak (YTB-702)
- Canarsee (YTB-703)
- Moratoc (YTB-704)
- Pequawet (YTB-705)
- Waliaki (YTB-706)
- Sanpoil (YTB-707)
- Setauket (YTB-708)
- Tocobaga (YTB-709)
- Tonkawa (YTB-710)
- Wabaquasset (YTB-724)
- YTB-725
- Oneka (YTB-729)
- Mahaska (YTB-730)
- Cockenoe (YTB-736)
- Wapasha (YTB-737), ex-YNT-13
- Namontack (YTB-738), ex-YNT-14
- Picqua (YTB-739)
- Metacom (YTB-740)
- Pokagon (YTB-746)
- Edenshaw (YTB-752)
- Marin (YTB-753)
- YTB-754
- YTB-755
- Pontiac (YTB-756)
- Oshkosh (YTB-757)
- Paducah (YTB-758)
- Bogalusa (YTB-759)

Natick-class

- Natick (YTB-760)
- Ottumwa (YTB-761)
- Tuscumbia (YTB-762), Operation Dominic nuclear test participant
- Muskegon (YTB-763)
- Mishawaka (YTB-764)
- Okmulgee (YTB-765)
- Wapakoneta (YTB-766)
- Apalachicola (YTB-767)
- Arcata (YTB-768)
- Chesaning (YTB-769)
- Dahlonega (YTB-770)
- Keokuk (YTB-771)
- Mascoutah (YTB-772)
- Menasha (YTB-773)
- Nashua (YTB-774)
- Wauwatosa (YTB-775)
- Weehawken (YTB-776)
- Nogalesen (YTB-777)
- Apopka (YTB-778)
- Manhattan (YTB-779), later YT-800
- Saugus (YTB-780)
- Niantic (YTB-781)
- Manistee (YTB-782)
- Redwing (YTB-783)
- Kalispell (YTB-784)
- Winnemucca (YTB-785)
- Tonkawa (YTB-786)
- Kittanning (YTB-787)
- Wapato (YTB-788)
- Tomahawk (YTB-789)
- Menominee (YTB-790)
- Marinette (YTB-791)
- Antigo (YTB-792)
- Piqua (YTB-793)
- Mandan (YTB-794)
- Ketchikan (YTB-795)
- Saco (YTB-796)
- Tamaqua (YTB-797)
- Opelika (YTB-798)
- Natchitoches (YTB-799)
- Eufaula (YTB-800)
- Palatka (YTB-801)
- Cheraw (YTB-802)
- Nanticoke (YTB-803)
- Ahoskie (YTB-804)
- Ocala (YTB-805)
- Tuskegee (YTB-806)
- Massapequa (YTB-807)
- Wenatchee (YTB-808)
- Agawam (YTB-809)
- Anoka (YTB-810)
- Houma (YTB-811)
- Accomac (YTB-812)
- Poughkeepsie (YTB-813)
- Waxahachie (YTB-814)
- Neodesha (YTB-815), later IX-540
- Campti (YTB-816)
- Hyannis (YTB-817)
- Mecosta (YTB-818)
- Iuka (YTB-819)
- Wanamassa (YTB-820) [A]
- Tontogany (YTB-821)
- Pawhuska (YTB-822)
- Canonchet (YTB-823)
- Santaquin (YTB-824) [A]
- Wathena (YTB-825)
- Washtucna (YTB-826), later YT-801
- Chetek (YTB-827)
- Catahecassa (YTB-828)
- Metacom (YTB-829)
- Pushmataha (YTB-830)
- Dekanawida (YTB-831) [A]
- Petalesharo (YTB-832)
- Shabonee (YTB-833)
- Negwagon (YTB-834)
- Skenandoa (YTB-835)
- Pokagon (YTB-836)
- YTB-837 through YTB-844

== Small harbor tugs (YTL) ==
- YTL-16 through YTL-18
- YTL-86 through YTL-96
- YTL-98
- YTL-99
- YTL-117
- YTL-118
- YTL-130
- YTL-132
- YTL-143
- YTL-144
- YTL-152 through YTL-169
- YTL-184 through YTL-186
- YTL-196
- YTL-197
- YTL-199 through YTL-212
- YTL-230 through YTL-237
- YTL-244 through YTL-251
- YTL-291 through YTL-320
- YTL-324
- YTL-333
- YTL-339
- YTL-340
- YTL-345
- YTL-346
- YTL-348
- YTL-351 through YTL-353
- YTL-355 through YTL-358
- YTL-360 through YTL-363
- YTL-422 through YTL-457
- YTL-473
- YTL-479 through YTL-490
- YTL-550
- YTL-553
- YTL-557 through YTL-560
- YTL-566
- YTL-567
- YTL-571
- YTL-583
- YTL-586
- YTL-588
- YTL-590 through YTL-592
- YTL-594
- YTL-600 through YTL-602
- YTL-614
- YTL-618
- YTL-710
- YTL-711
- YTL-718
- Okisko (YTL-735), ex-YNT-10
- YTL-761
- USS Cocheco II YTL-815
- USS Lokota YTL-816

== Medium harbor tugs (YTM) ==
- Iwana (YTM-2)
- Unadilla (YTM-4)
- Samoset (YTM-5)
- Penacook (YTM-6)
- Pawtucket (YTM-7)
- Sotoyomo (YTM-9)
- YTM-13
- YTM-14
- Tecumseh (YTM-24)
- Catawba (YTM-32)
- Choptank (YTM-36)
- Active (YTM-112)
- Reindeer (YTM-115)
- Geronimo (YTM-119)
- Stallion (YTM-120)
- Tillamook (YTM-122)
- Challenge (YTM-126), ex-SP-1015, ex-AT-59, ex-YT-126
- Powhatan (YTM-128)
- Osceola (YTM-129)
- Massasoit (YTM-131)
- Narkeeta (YTM-133)
- Wahneta (YTM-134)
- Cahokia (YTM-135)
- Tamaroa (YTM-136)
- Woban (YTM-138)
- Ala (YTM-139), grounded and sank, Kuluk Bay, Adak, Alaska, 19 May 1964
- Wahtah (YTM-140)
- Heekon (YTM-141)
- Nokomis (YTM-142)
- Montezuma (YTM-145)
- Hoga (YTM-146)
- Tazhia (YTM-147)
- Wenonah (YTM-148)
- Toka (YTM-149)
- Woyot (YTM-150)
- Konoka (YTM-151)
- Alloway (YTM-170)
- Allaquippa (YTM-174)
- Chekilli (YTM-175)
- Junaluska (YTM-176)
- Black Fox (YTM-177)
- Dekaury (YTM-178)
- Madokawando (YTM-180)
- Mazapeta (YTM-181)
- Mawkaw (YTM-182)
- Canonicus (YTM-187)
- Negwagon (YTM-188)
- Nepanet (YTM-189)
- Orono (YTM-190)
- Sassacus (YTM-193)
- Yonaguska (YTM-195)
- YTM-213
- Alamingo (YTM-227)
- YTM-239
- YTM-240
- YTM-243
- Dekanisora (YTM-252)
- Menoquet (YTM-256)
- Arivaca (YTM-259)
- Oneyana (YTM-262)
- Neoga (YTM-263)
- Hiawatha (YTM-265)
- Red Cloud (YTM-268)
- Sakarissa (YTM-269)
- Satanta (YTM-270)
- Minnehaha (YTM-271)
- Iwana (YTM-272)
- Olathe (YTM-273)
- YTM-321
- YTM-322
- Lively (YTM-323)
- Mamo (YTM-325)
- Sacagawea (YTM-326)
- Mauvila (YTM-328)
- YTM-330
- Dohasan (YTM-335)
- Skenandoa (YTM-336)
- YTM-342
- Oratamin (YTM-347)
- Neomonni (YTM-349)
- Corbitant (YTM-354)
- Pawtucket (YTM-359)
- Sassaba (YTM-364)
- Segwarusa (YTM-365)
- Waubansee (YTM-366)
- Wawasee (YTM-367)
- Shahaka (YTM-368)
- Shamokin (YTM-369)
- Skandawati (YTM-370)
- Smohalla (YTM-371)
- Tatarrax (YTM-372)
- Topenebee (YTM-373)
- Vaga (YTM-374)
- Oconostota (YTM-375)
- Candoto (YTM-377)
- Chicomico (YTM-378)
- Chanagi (YTM-380)
- Chepanoc (YTM-381)
- Coatopa (YTM-382)
- Cochali (YTM-383)
- Waneta (YTM-384)
- Wannalancet (YTM-385)
- Washakie (YTM-386)
- Watseka (YTM-387)
- Connewango (YTM-388)
- Ganadoga (YTM-390)
- Itara (YTM-391)
- Mecosta (YTM-392)
- Nakarna (YTM-393)
- Winamac (YTM-394)
- Wingina (YTM-395)
- Wovoka (YTM-396)
- Yanegua (YTM-397)
- Natahki (YTM-398)
- Numa (YTM-399)
- Otokomi (YTM-400)
- Owachomo (YTM-401)
- Panameta (YTM-402)
- Pitamakan (YTM-403)
- Coshecton (YTM-404)
- Cusseta (YTM-405)
- Kittaton (YTM-406)
- Lonoto (YTM-407)
- Minniska (YTM-408)
- Anamosa (YTM-409)
- Allamakee (YTB-410)
- Conchardee (YTM-412)
- Porobago (YTM-413)
- Satago (YTM-414)
- Secota (YTM-415)
- Taconnet (YTM-417)
- Tensaw (YTM-418)
- Topawa (YTM-419)
- Wallacut (YTM-420)
- Windigo (YTM-421)
- YTM-460 through YTM-462
- Cholocco (YTM-464)
- Chipola (YTM-466)
- YTM-467, lost in the Marshall or Gilbert Islands, March 1944
- YTM-468 through YTM-472
- YTM-474 through YTM-478
- Abinago (YTM-493)
- Alnaba (YTM-494)
- Barboncito (YTM-495)
- Chahao (YTM-496)
- Tlingit (YTM-497)
- Manteo (YTM-517)
- Hisada (YTM-518)
- Mahoa (YTM-519)
- Nacheninga (YTM-520)
- Nabigwon (YTM-521)
- Sagawamick (YTM-522)
- Senasqua (YTM-523)
- Tutahaco (YTM-524)
- Wabanaquot (YTM-525)
- Wahaka (YTM-526)
- Wahpeton (YTM-527)
- Ocmulgee (YTM-532)
- Shahaska (YTM-533)
- Nadli (YTM-534)
- Nahasho (YTM-535)
- Nahoke (YTM-536)
- Nanigo (YTM-537)
- Sikis (YTM-539)
- Quileute (YTM-540)
- Ozette (YTM-541)
- Chegodega (YTM-542)
- Etawina (YTM-543)
- Yatanocas (YTM-544)
- Accohanoc (YTM-545)
- Takos (YTM-546)
- Yanaba (YTM-547)
- Matunak (YTM-548)
- Migadan (YTM-549)
- YTM-606
- YTM-607
- Acoma (YTM-701)
- Arawak (YTM-702)
- Canarsee (YTM-703)
- Moratoc (YTM-704)
- YTM-721
- YTM-722
- Hopocan (YTM-728)
- Oneka (YTM-729)
- Keshena (YTM-731)
- Canasatego (YTM-732)
- Donacona (YTM-733)
- Mankato (YTM-734)
- Tahchee (YTM-736)
- Annawan (YTM-739)
- Metacom (YTM-740)
- Tamaque (YTM-741)
- Adario (YTM-743)
- Chicopee (YTM-747)
- Yuma (YTM-748)
- Kaukauna (YTM-749)
- Hackensack (YTM-750)
- Manteo (YTM-751)
- Kewaunee (YTM-752)
- Naugatuck (YTM-753)
- Woonsocket (YTM-754)
- Waukegan (YTM-755)
- Owatonna (YTM-756)
- Wahpeton (YTM-757)
- YTM-758
- Mizar (YTM-759)
- Mascoutah (YTM-760)
- Menasha (YTM-761)
- Pokanoket (YTM-762)
- Muskegon (YTM-763)
- Cholocco (YTM-764)
- Chiquito (YTM-765)
- Chohonaga (YTM-766)
- Ankachak (YTM-767)
- Apohola (YTM-768)
- Hombro (YTM-769)
- Mimac (YTM-770)
- Nootka (YTM-771)
- Makah (YTM-772)
- Chilkat (YTM-773)
- Carascan (YTM-774)
- Hastwiana (YTM-775)
- Hiamonee (YTM-776)
- Lelaka (YTM-777)
- Oswegatchie (YTM-778)
- Pocasset (YTM-779)
- Pokanoket (YTM-780)
- YTM-800 through YTM-804

== (YTN) ==
Unknown type, appeared without description as project SCB 61P in a Ship Characteristics Board project list.

== Torpedo trials craft (YTT) ==
- YTT-3, later YR-42

Cape Flattery-class

- Cape Flattery (YTT-9)
- Battle Point (YTT-10) [A]
- Discovery Bay (YTT-11) [A]
- Agate Pass (YTT-12)

== Drone aircraft catapult control craft (YV) ==
- Catapult (YV-1), ex-LSM-445
- Launcher (YV-2), ex-LSM-446
- Targeteer (YV-3), ex-LSM(R)-508, nicknamed the "world's smallest aircraft carrier"

== Water barges (YW, YWN) ==
YW barges are self-propelled, YWN barges are not.

- YW-2, later YO-10, YR-19
- YW-50 - captured 10 December 1941 at Guam
- YW-54 - captured 10 December 1941 at Guam
- YW-55 - captured 10 December 1941 at Guam
- YW-56, ex-DD-259, later IX-98
- YW-58 - captured 10 December 1941 at Guam
- YW-87, later Monob One (IX-309), (YAG-61)
- YW-92 - Operation Crossroads participant
- YW-97, ex-SC-64
- YW-114, sank when cargo shifted at Tongass Narrows near Ketchikan, Alaska, on 12 August 1989
- YW-120, ex-PC-624
- YW-145, later YWN-145
- YW-146, later YWN-146
- YWN-148, ex-YON-187
- YWN-154, later YOGN-125
- YWN-156, ex-YOGN-116
- YWN-157, ex-YOG-32

== Unclassified vessels ==
=== Barrier boats ===
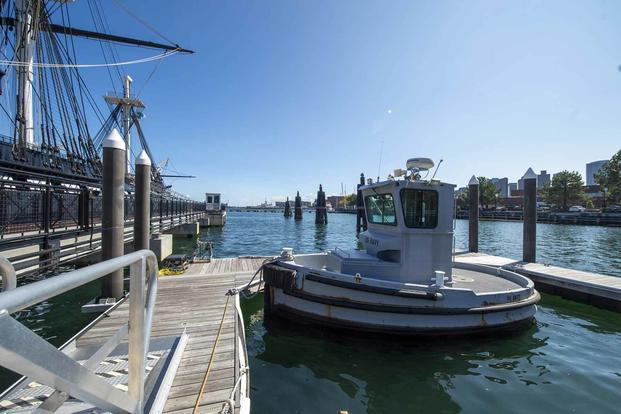
Barrier Boat (19BB)

The 19 foot, 9.5 ton Barrier Boats (19BB) were built to deploy and maintain port security booms surrounding Navy ships and installations in port. A total 13 unnamed boats were first delivered in 2003.

Other TR-01 + TR-xx Barrier Boats are 30-foot Modutech work boats.

== Gallery ==
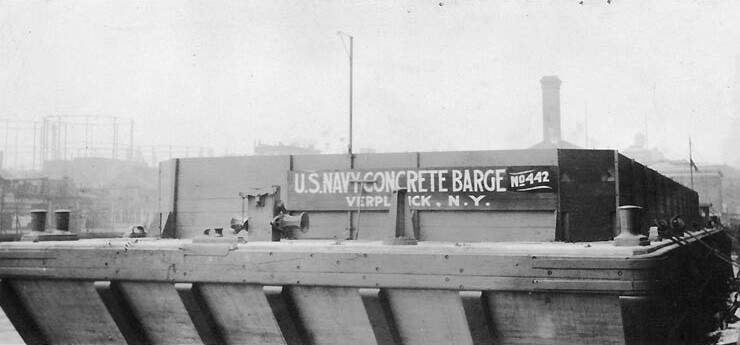
YC-442

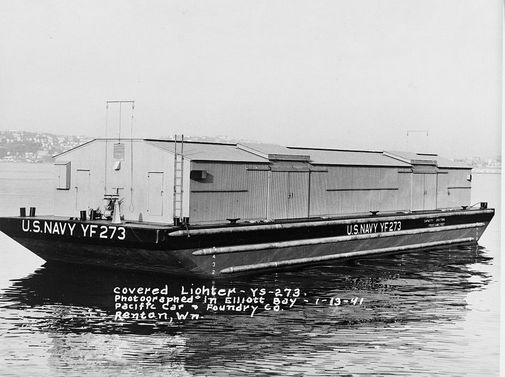
YF-273

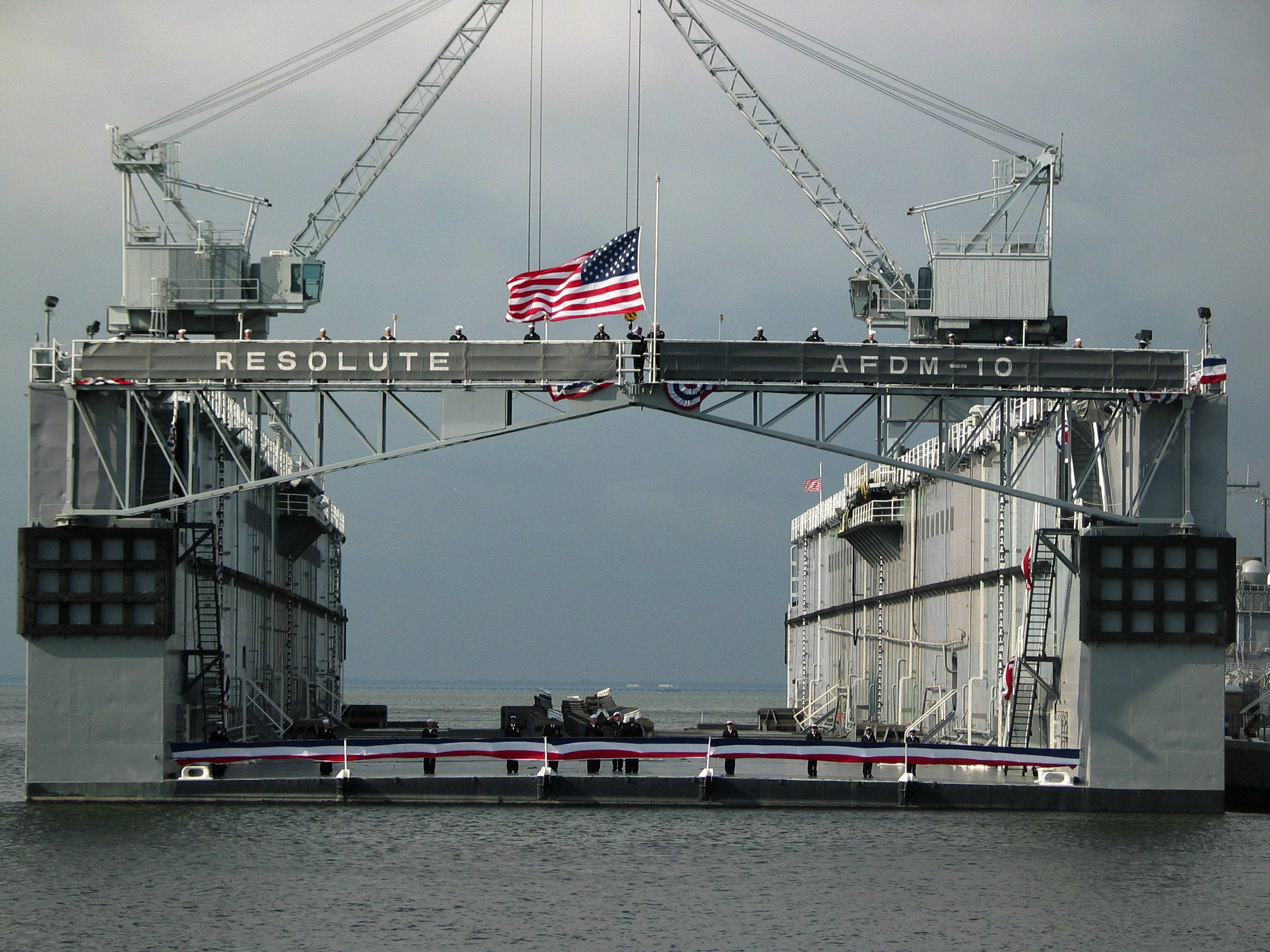
Former YFD-67

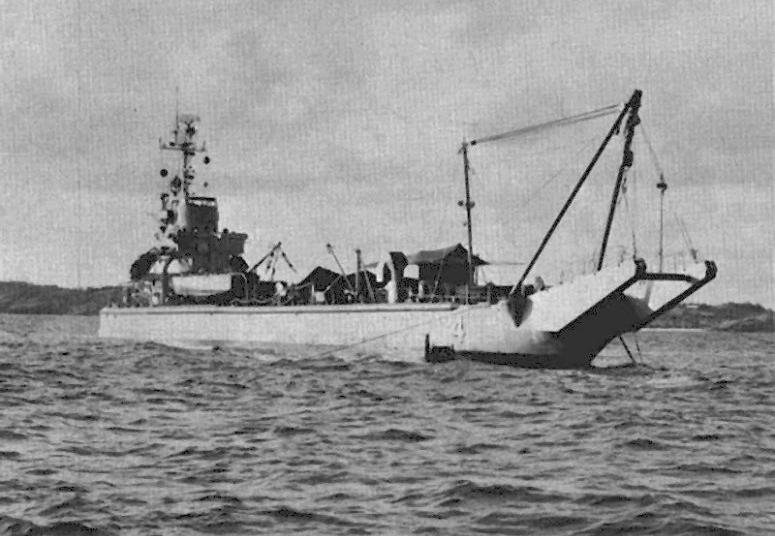
YMLC-3

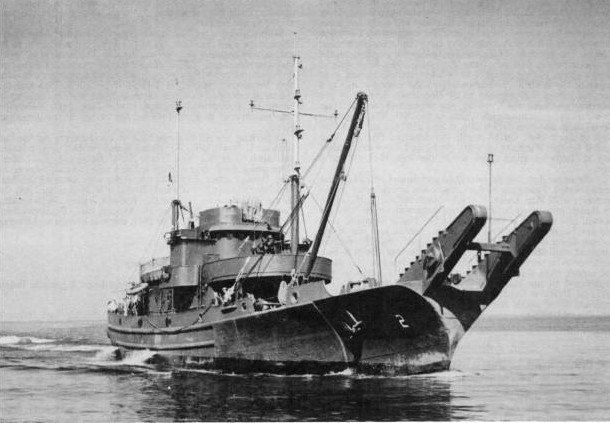
YN-2

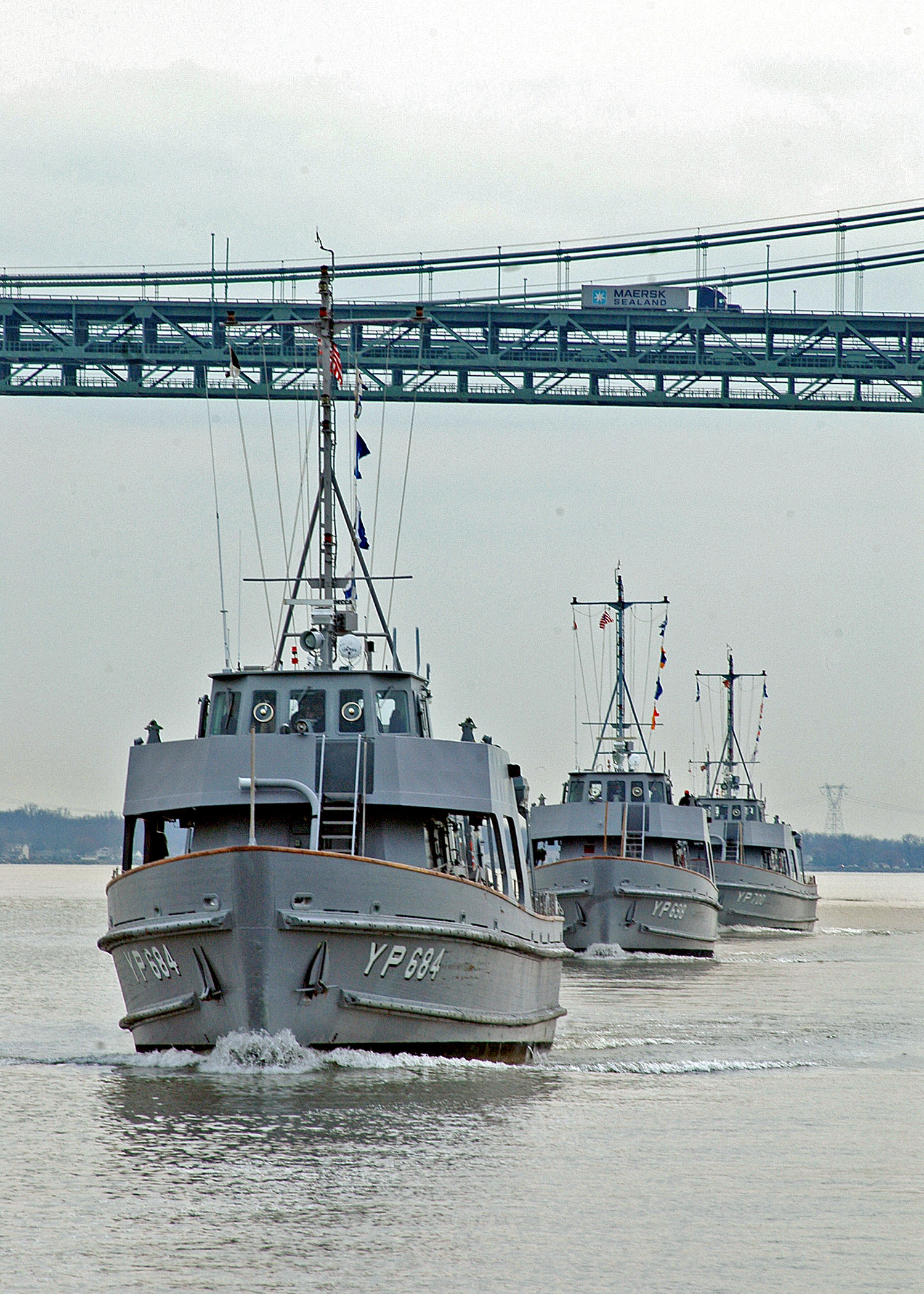
YP-684

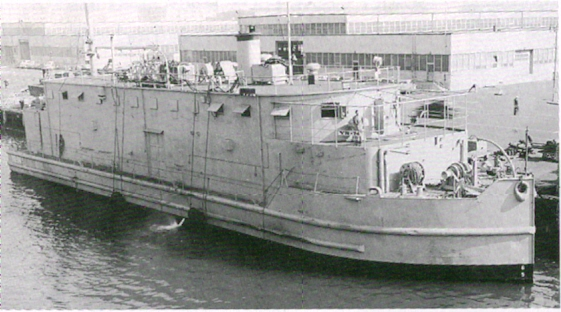
YR-74

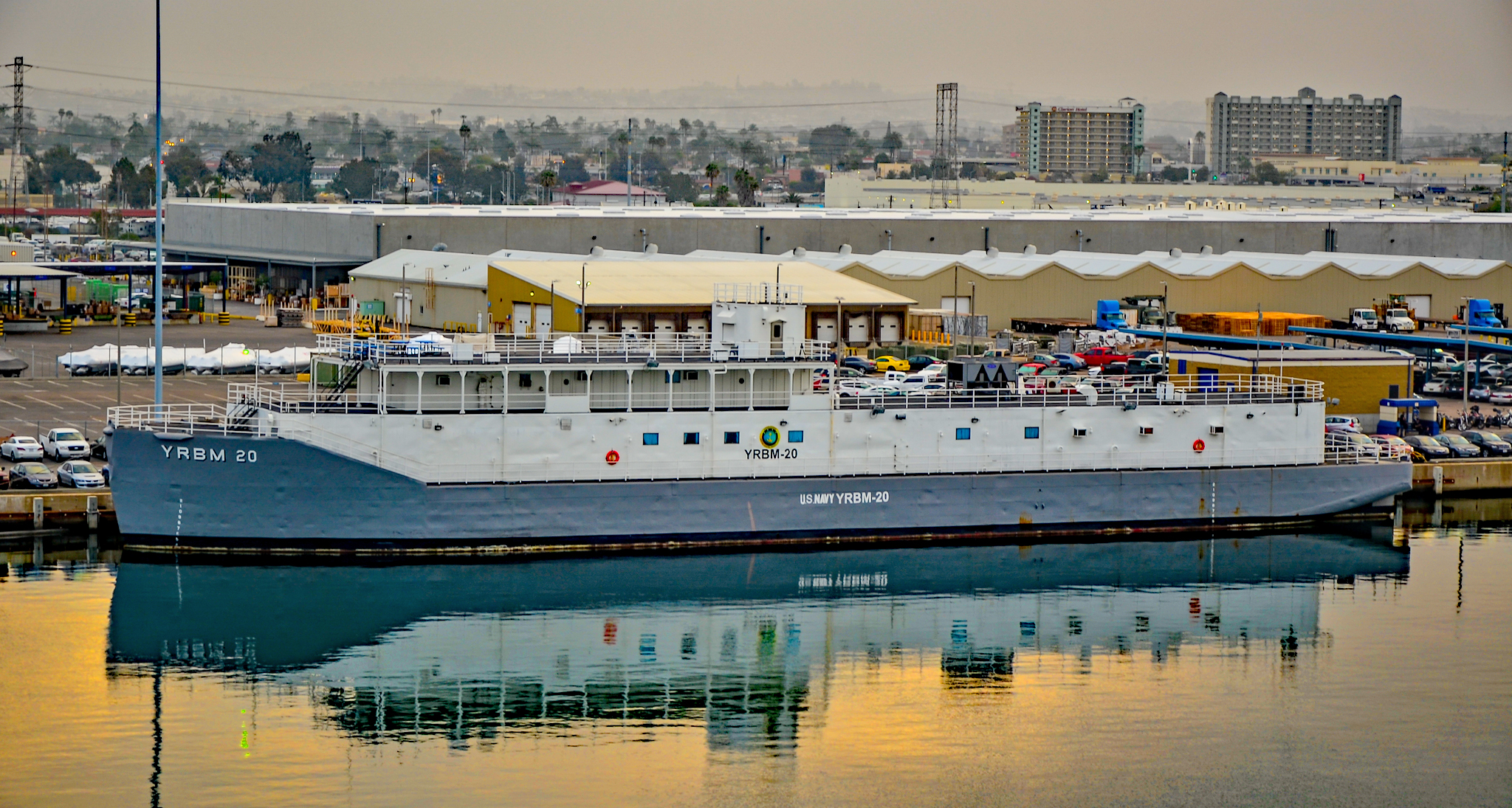
YRBM-20

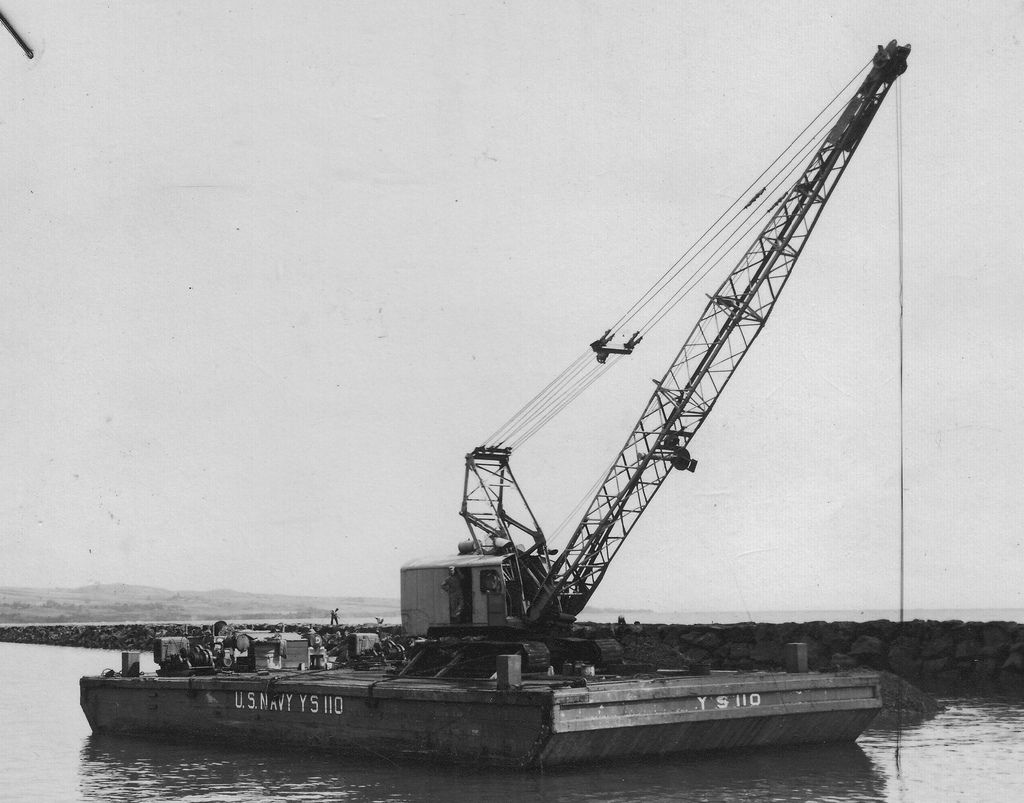
YS-110 with crawler crane

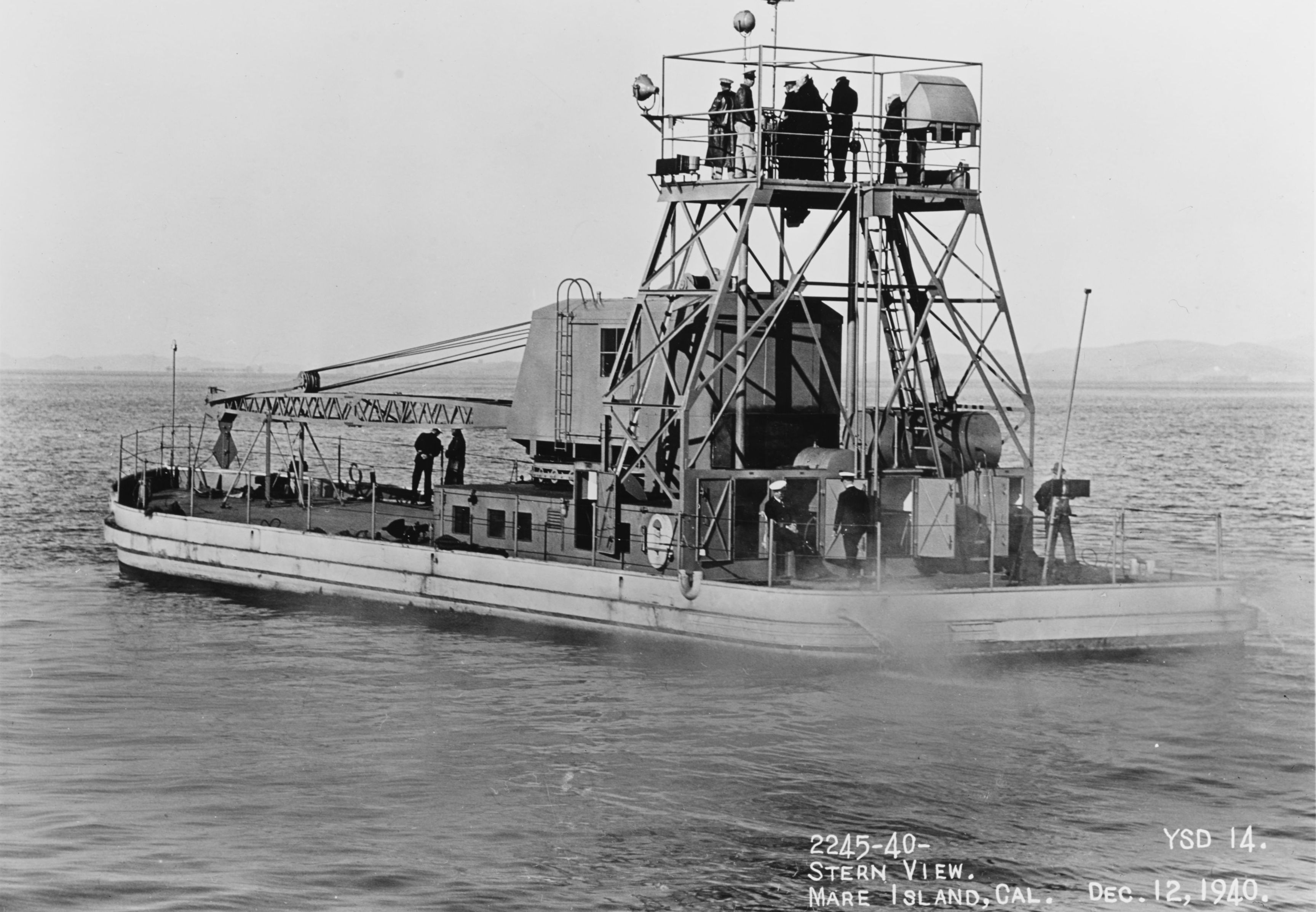
YSD-14

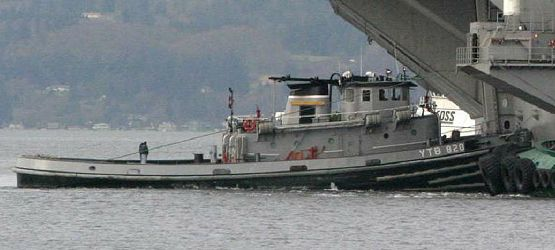
YTB-820

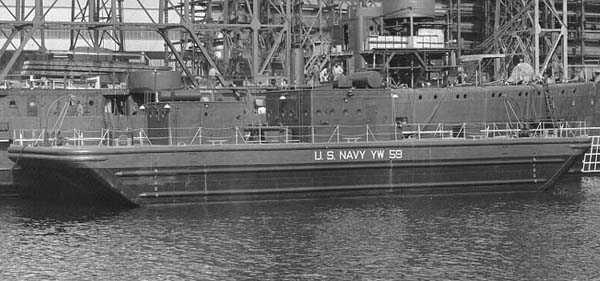
YW-59

== See also ==
- List of current ships of the United States Navy
- List of United States Navy ships
- List of United States Navy losses in World War II § District craft - abbreviated list
- List of U.S. Navy ships sunk or damaged in action during World War II § District craft - detailed list
- List of unclassified miscellaneous vessels of the United States Navy
- Glossary of watercraft types in service of the United States
- Coaling (ships)
- United States Navy torpedo retrievers

Similar United States Maritime Administration (MARAD) designations:

- Type B ship
- Type V ship
