= Natchitoches =

Natchitoches may refer to:

- Natchitoches people, an American Indian people
- Natchitoches meat pie

== Places and jurisdictions ==
- Natchitoches, Louisiana, a city
  - the former, now titular, Latin Catholic Roman Catholic Diocese of Natchitoches, with see in the above Louisiana town
  - Natchitoches (YTB-799), a naval tugboat named for the parish Seat
- Natchitoches Parish, Louisiana
- Natchitoches Regional Airport

== See also ==
- Nacogdoches, Texas
