= Mecosta (YTM-392) =

Tugboat of the United States Navy

History

United States
- Name: USS Mecosta
- Namesake: Mecosta, a 19th century Potawatomi chief.
- Builder: Consolidated Shipbuilding Corporation, Morris Heights, New York
- Laid down: 13 September 1944
- Launched: 28 October 1944
- In service: 20 January 1945
- Reclassified: Reclassified YTM-391 1 February 1962
- Fate: Sold to commercial interests 1 July 1981; Scrapped in 2012

General characteristics
- Class & type: Sassaba-class harbor tug
- Displacement: 260 tons; 345 tons (full)
- Length: 100 ft 0 in (30.48 m)
- Beam: 25 ft 0 in (7.62 m)
- Draft: 9 ft 7 in (2.92 m) (full)
- Speed: 12 knots (22 km/h; 14 mph)
- Complement: 14

Originally contracted to be built as YT‑392 on 7 April 1941, Mecosta (YTB‑392) was laid down by Consolidated Shipbuilding Corp., Morris Heights, N.Y., 13 September 1944; launched 28 October 1944: and placed in service 20 January 1945.

Mecosta was assigned to Service Squadron 1, Service Force, Atlantic Fleet, for a year of towing and salvage duties from arrival off the European coast 1 March. In March 1946 she transferred to the Naval Operating Base at Bermuda for support service as a large harbor tug for the next 9 years. She was redesignated YTM‑392 on 1 February 1962. Mecosta began operations with the Atlantic Fleet, based from Norfolk, Va., in March 1965, continuing her service to the fleet into 1969.

In 1981, she was acquired for commercial service by Seabrook Towing Incorporated and renamed South Carolina. Seabrook was purchased by McAllister Brothers Towing in 1987, with the tug retaining her name. In 2002, she was acquired by Tucker Roy Marine Towing and Salvage Company and renamed R. Marcel Roy. She operated under this name until she was scrapped in 2012.
