= USS Cahto =

Tugboat of the United States Navy

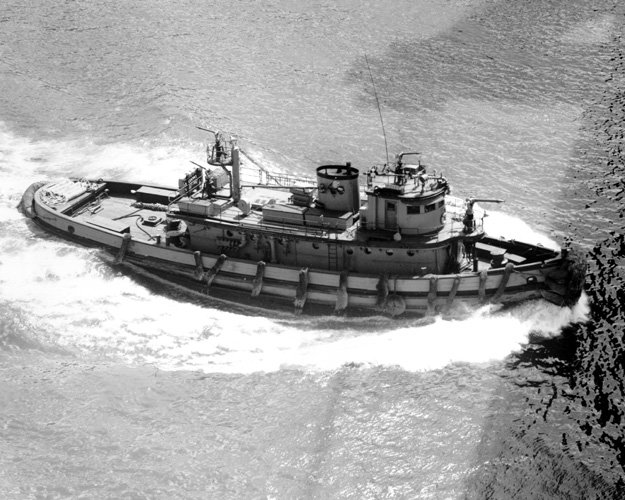
- USS Cahto (YTB-215) underway, date and location unknown.

History

United States
- Name: Cahto
- Namesake: Cahto
- Builder: W. A. Robinson, Ipswich, Massachusetts
- In service: 1 June 1944
- Out of service: 6 May 1957
- Reclassified: YTB-215, 15 May 1944
- Identification: Hull symbol: YT-218; Hull symbol: YTB-218; Call sign: NUWD
- Fate: Disposed, 1957

General characteristics
- Class & type: Cahto-class large harbor tug
- Displacement: 410 long tons (420 t)
- Length: 110 ft (34 m)
- Beam: 27 ft (8.2 m)
- Draft: 11 ft 4 in (3.45 m)
- Installed power: 1,000 shp (750 kW)
- Propulsion: Diesel engine; 1 × Screw
- Speed: 12 kn (22 km/h; 14 mph)
- Complement: 12
- Armament: 2 × .50-caliber machine guns

USS Cahto (YT/YTB-215) was the lead ship of the Cahto-class large harbor tug in the service of the United States Navy.

== Construction ==
Cahto (YT-215) was laid down by W. A. Robinson, Inc., at Ipswich, Massachusetts, and reclassified a large harbor tug YTB-215 on 15 May 1944.

== Service history ==
Cahto was placed in service on 1 June, for duty in the 3rd Naval District. She remained in operation there until 5 July 1956, when she was transferred to the 6th Naval District, remaining active until her disposal on 6 May 1957.

Cahto was commanded by Ensign James Edward Hair, in 1944–1945, who was one of the "Golden Thirteen", the first African-American commissioned officers in the US Navy.

== Bibliography ==
- "Cahto (YTB-215)". NavSource. 8 April 2011.
- Colton, Tim (2 January 2015). "W. A. Robinson". shipbuildinghistory.com.
- "Cahto (YTB-215)". Dictionary of American Naval fighting ships. Naval History and Heritage Command. This article incorporates text from this source, which is in the public domain.
