= USS YP-400 =

- USS YP-400, 1942-1943

History
- Name: USS YP-400
- Builder: Tacoma Boat Building Company, Tacoma
- Completed: 1942
- Acquired: acquired by the U.S. Navy, 24 May 1942
- Honors and awards: American Campaign Medal; World War II Victory Medal
- Fate: unknown
- Notes: Call sign: NZPS

General characteristics
- Type: Patrol boat
- Displacement: 187 long tons (190 t)
- Length: 93 ft (28 m) o/a
- Beam: 24 ft (7.3 m)
- Installed power: 400 shp
- Propulsion: Atlas Diesel engine; 1 × screw
- Complement: 18 (2 officers, 16 enlisted men)

USS YP-400 was a seiner acquired by the U.S. Navy before completion during World War II to serve as a patrol boat.

== History ==
She was laid down as a seiner at the Tacoma shipyard of the Tacoma Boat Building Company. On 24 May 1942, she was acquired by the U.S. Navy while still being built and completed later in the year. She was designated as a Yard Patrol Craft (YP) and assigned to the 13th Naval District. Her commanding officer was Lieutenant Commandeer Vernon Johnson. She was one of the initial ships assigned to Ralph C. Parker's Alaskan Sector of the 13th Naval District colloquially known as the "Alaskan Navy".

In 1946, she was transferred to the United States Maritime Commission; her ultimate fate is unknown.
