= USS YP-155 =

History
- Name: USS YP-155
- Acquired: acquired by US Navy, 1941
- Stricken: 3 January 1946
- Homeport: Dutch Harbor, Alaska
- Honors and awards: American Campaign Medal; Asiatic–Pacific Campaign Medal; World War II Victory Medal
- Fate: unknown
- Notes: Call sign: NAXI

General characteristics
- Type: Patrol boat
- Displacement: 74 gross register tons
- Length: 81 ft (25 m) o/a
- Propulsion: Cooper-Bessemer Diesel engine; 1 × screw

USS YP-155 was a converted fishing vessel which served as an auxiliary patrol boat in the U.S. Navy during World War II.

== History ==
She was laid down as seiner and named Storm. In 1941, she was acquired by the U.S. Navy, designated as a Yard Patrol Craft (YP), and assigned to the 13th Naval District. She was one of the initial ships assigned to Ralph C. Parker's Alaskan Sector of the 13th Naval District colloquially known as the "Alaskan Navy". She operated out of Dutch Harbor.

On 3 January 1946, she was struck from the Naval List.
