= Catahecassa (YTB-828) =

Tugboat of the United States Navy

History

United States
- Awarded: 5 June 1973
- Builder: Marinette Marine, Marinette, Wisconsin
- Laid down: 8 October 1973
- Launched: 29 May 1974
- In service: 16 August 1974
- Stricken: 27 September 2011
- Status: Awaiting disposal

General characteristics
- Class & type: Natick-class large harbor tug
- Displacement: 286 long tons (291 t) (light); 346 long tons (352 t) (full)
- Length: 101 ft (31 m)
- Beam: 31 ft (9.4 m)
- Draft: 14 ft (4.3 m)
- Speed: 12 knots (14 mph; 22 km/h)
- Complement: 12
- Armament: None

Catahecassa (YTB-827) was a United States Navy Natick-class large harbor tug.

== Construction ==
The contract for Catahecassa was awarded 5 June 1973. She was laid down on 8 October 1973 at Marinette, Wisconsin, by Marinette Marine and launched 29 May 1974.

== Operational history ==
Catahecassa served as a U.S. Navy Harbor Tug. She was originally assigned to the Naval Weapons Station (NWS), in Concord, California in August 1974.

After the closure of NWS, she was assigned to Naval Station Bremerton, in Bremerton, Washington in the mid to late nineties. She was stricken from the Navy List 27 September 27, 2011.

In 2013, she was sold to Basic Towing and renamed “Gina”.

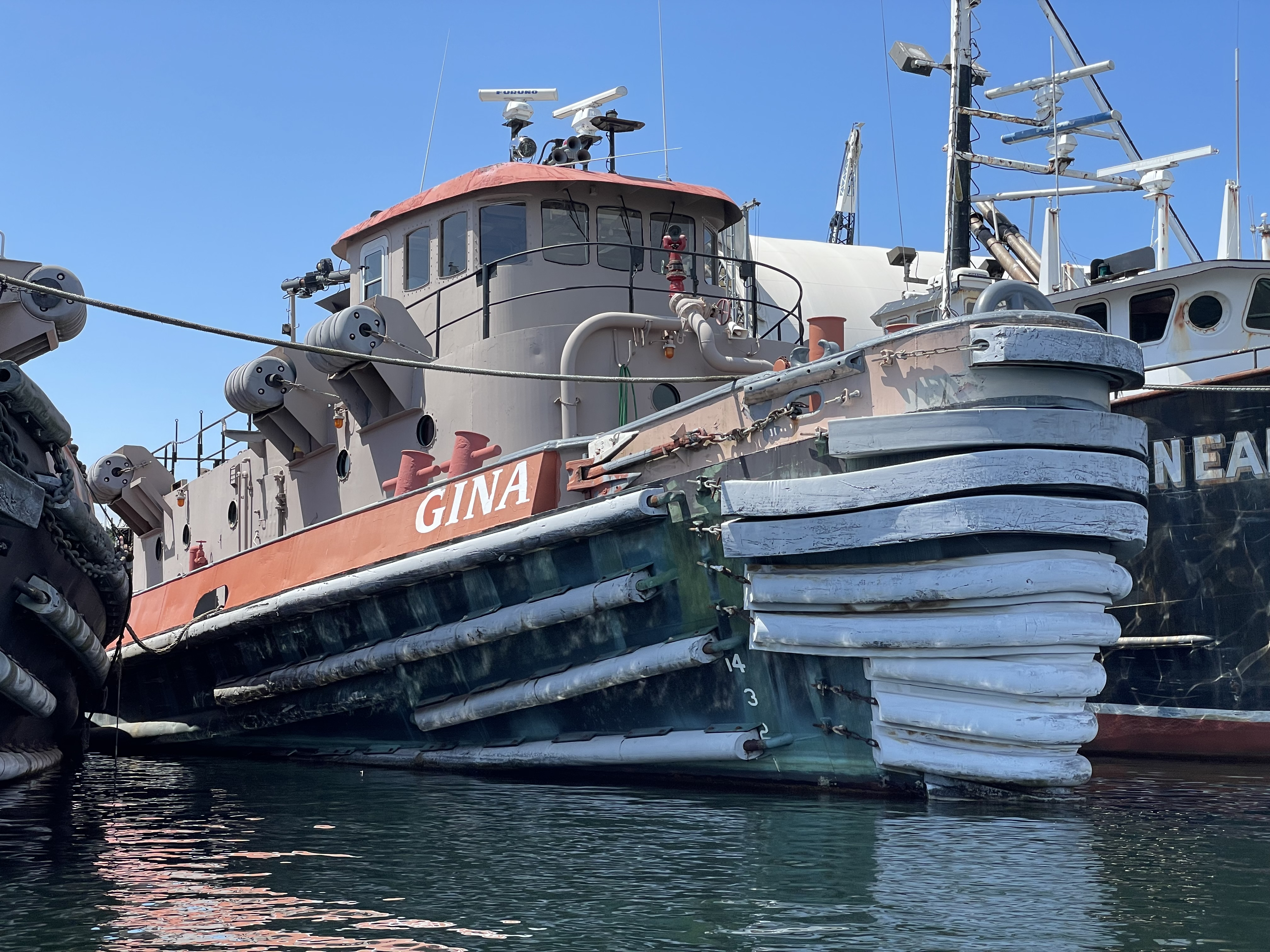
Ex-Catahecassa (YTB-828) moored in Seattle, Washington
