= USS Alloway (YT-170) =

Tugboat of the United States Navy

History

United States
- Ordered: as Russell No. 12
- Laid down: 1935
- Launched: 1935
- Acquired: 28 October 1940
- Commissioned: 7 November 1940
- Decommissioned: 19 August 1946
- Stricken: 10 June 1947
- Homeport: Dahlgren, Virginia
- Fate: Unknown

General characteristics
- Displacement: 95 tons
- Length: 71 ft (22 m)
- Beam: 19 ft (5.8 m)
- Draught: 10 ft 6 in (3.20 m)
- Complement: not known

USS Alloway (YT-170/YTM-170) was an Alloway-class tugboat acquired by the U.S. Navy for the task of providing yard tugboat services during World War II, when U.S. ports were often congested with ships arriving and departing.

The second Alloway (YT-170) -- a diesel-powered tug built in 1935 as Russell No. 12 – was acquired by the Navy on 28 October 1940 at New York City from the Newton Creek Towing Co.; renamed Alloway the following day and simultaneously designated YT-170; converted to naval service by the New York Navy Yard; and placed in service at New York City on 7 November 1940.

== World War II service ==
Alloway was initially ordered to the 5th Naval District and stationed at the Naval Proving Grounds at Dahlgren, Virginia, where she served through the end of World War II.

During her tour of duty, Alloway was reclassified a medium harbor tug and redesignated YTM-170 on 15 May 1944.

On 21 March 1946, she was assigned to temporary duty with the 5th Naval District at Norfolk, Virginia, preparatory to her inactivation.

== Post-war decommissioning ==
Alloway was placed out of service at Little Creek, Virginia, on 19 August 1946. Her name was struck from the Navy Directory on 10 June 1947, and she was turned over to the Maritime Commission's War Shipping Administration for disposal.
