= USS Bomazeen =

Tugboat of the United States Navy

History

United States
- Namesake: Bomazeen (d. 1724), Norridgewock sachem
- Launched: 1919
- Acquired: 29 December 1941
- In service: 4 February 1942
- Out of service: 29 November 1945
- Stricken: 19 December 1945
- Fate: War Shipping Administration

General characteristics
- Displacement: 426 tons
- Length: 142 ft 0 in (43.28 m)
- Beam: 27 ft 7 in (8.41 m)

USS Bomazeen was originally the Bathgate, a tugboat built in 1919 at New York and purchased by the United States Navy on 29 December 1941 from the Meseck Towing Lines. She was renamed Bomazeen; designated YT 238 and placed in service on 4 February 1942. The ship's namesake was Bomazeen, who was "a chief, or sachem, of the Kennebec tribe who resided at Norridgewock, on the Kennebec River in what is now the state of Maine."

She was converted for naval work by the Marine Basin Iron Works at Brooklyn, New York. After service at New York and in the 1st Naval District, Bomazeen reported for duty in the 5th Naval District on 9 October 1942 and, but for some temporary duty at the Washington Navy Yard, remained there through the end of the war. On 15 May 1944, she was reclassified a large harbor tug and redesignated YTB 238. Bomazeen was placed out of service on 29 November 1945, and her name was struck from the Navy list on 19 December 1945. She was turned over to the War Shipping Administration on 17 March 1947 for disposal.
