= USS Wingina =

Tugboat of the United States Navy

History

United States
- Name: USS Wingina
- Namesake: The principal chief of the Secotan Indians in North Carolina during Sir Walter Raleigh's two expeditions in 1585 and 1586.
- Builder: Gibbs Gas Engine Co., Jacksonville, Florida
- Laid down: 25 January 1944 (As YT-395)
- Launched: 14 July 1944
- Sponsored by: Mrs. Ralph B. Weidner, wife of Ens. R. B. Weidner, USNR
- Commissioned: 15 December 1944
- Out of service: Was still in service in Nov 1983–I was her last Chief Engineer and Assistant Crsftmaster at that time
- Renamed: Murph, c. December 1986
- Reclassified: 1.District Harbor Tug, Large (YTB-395) while still under construction 15 May 1944; 2.District Harbor Tug, Medium YTM-395 in February 1962
- Identification: YTB-395
- Fate: Stripped and scuttled in Quartermaster Harbor, Maury Island, Washington in Oct 2007.

General characteristics
- Class & type: Sassaba-class tugboat
- Displacement: 237 tons light; 345 tons full load
- Length: 100 ft (30 m)
- Beam: 25 ft (7.6 m)
- Draft: 11 ft (3.4 m)
- Propulsion: Diesel Engine, Single Screw
- Speed: 12 kn (22 km/h; 14 mph)
- Complement: 14
- Armament: Unknown, but others of this class carried two 0.5 in (12.7 mm) Machine Guns.

USS Wingina (YTB-395) is a tugboat that was laid down as District Harbor Tug YT-395. She was re-classified while still under construction as District Harbor Tug, Large YTB-395. After her commissioning, she served in the United States Navy from 1944 to 1980.

Wingina was assigned to the Pacific Fleet, 13th Naval District at the Bremerton Navy Yard in Puget Sound, Washington. She served there until shortly after the end of World War II when, like many surplus vessels she was placed out of service and moved to the reserve fleet. Wingina was berthed at the Columbia River Group of the Pacific Reserve Fleet at Astoria, Oregon until she was reactivated in 1947.

In February 1962, she was redesignated a second time, as District Harbor Tug, Medium YTM-415.

For a brief time – June 1964 to March 1965 – Wingina was carried on the naval vessel register as being in "active" status, but as a "redesignated activity craft". At the end of that period, she was reclassified back to "active, in service", a status in which she operated in the 13th Naval District providing pilotage, tug and tow services, and waterfront fire protection, well into 1979.

Placed out of service again in late 1979 or early 1980, Wingina remained berthed in reserve until the end of 1985. On 31 December 1985, she was sticken from the Navy List and was sold for commercial service on 16 December 1986. She was renamed Murph by her new owners. In October 2007, she was stripped and scuttled (illegally) in Quartermaster Harbor, Maury Island, Washington. She is listed on the Washington Department of Natural Resources list as a derelict/abandoned vessel. The State of Washington would like to clear the wreck as she remains a navigational hazard; her mast is only three feet beneath the surface and her funnel is visible above the surface at low tide. Two navigational buoys mark her position warning away maritime traffic.

In the meantime, she remains a popular wreck dive given her shallow depth and ease of access.
