= USS Sparrow (AMc-31) =

Minesweeper of the United States Navy

History

United States
- Ordered: as Pacific
- Completed: 1929
- Acquired: 14 November 1940
- In service: 8 March 1941
- Out of service: 18 June 1946
- Stricken: 19 July 1946
- Fate: fate unknown

General characteristics
- Displacement: 112 tons
- Length: 83 ft (25 m)
- Beam: 19 ft (5.8 m)
- Draught: 9 ft (2.7 m)
- Speed: 11.0 knots
- Complement: 16

USS Sparrow (AMc-31) was a coastal minesweeper acquired by the U.S. Navy for the dangerous task of removing mines from minefields laid in the water to prevent ships from passing.

== World War II service ==
The purse seiner Pacific was acquired by the Navy on November 14, 1940 at San Diego, California. Fifteen days later, she was assigned the name Sparrow, and designated a coastal minesweeper, AMC-31.

=== Reclassified harbor tug ===
On December 12, 1940, she was reclassified as a harbor tug, and the name Sparrow was cancelled. On February 5, 1941, she was named Marin, and redesignated a net tender, YN-53.
