= USS Catawba =

Five ships of the United States Navy have been named Catawba, after the Catawba River of North Carolina.

- USS Catawba, was an ironclad built for use in the American Civil War, but never commissioned and sold to Peru, where she was renamed Atahualpa and served in the War of the Pacific.
- USS Catawba (YT-32), ex-Howard Greene (renamed 20 July 1920), served as a district tug at Washington from 1918 to 1922, at Norfolk, Virginia from 1922 to 1933, and at Charleston, South Carolina from 1933 through 1946. On 26 December 1946, Catawba was transferred to the Maritime Commission for disposal.
- USS Catawba (AT-68), was renamed Arapaho on 5 August 1941, prior to her launching.
- USS Catawba (ATA-210), was an auxiliary fleet tug in service from 1945 to 1975.
- USNS Catawba (T-ATF-168), is a fleet ocean tug assigned to the Military Sealift Command in 1980. in active service
