= USS Wannalancet =

Tugboat of the United States Navy

History

United States
- Name: USS Wannalancet
- Namesake: A variant spelling of Wonalancet (ca. 1619-1697), a leader of the Penacook Indian Confederacy
- Builder: Ira S. Bushey and Sons, Brooklyn, New York
- Launched: 12 January 1944
- Completed: May 1944
- Decommissioned: March 1946
- Reclassified: Medium harbor tug (YTM-384) February 1962
- Fate: Transferred to Venezuela January 1963

General characteristics
- Class & type: Pessacus-class harbor tug
- Displacement: 218 tons
- Length: 101 ft (31 m)
- Beam: 25 ft (7.6 m)
- Draft: 10 ft (3.0 m)
- Speed: 12 knots
- Complement: 10

USS Wannalancet (YTB-385), projected as YT-385, later YTM-385, was a United States Navy harbor tug in commission from 1944 to 1946.

Wannalancet was launched as a harbor tug designated YT-385 on 12 January 1944 by Ira S. Bushey and Sons at Brooklyn, New York. Her class of tugs was reclassified as large harbor tugs and given "YTB" hull classifications before she was completed, and she was designated YTB-385 by the time she was completed in May 1944.

Assigned to Service Force, United States Pacific Fleet, soon thereafter, Wannalancet operated in support of the fleet during World War II.

Wannalancet was placed in reserve in March 1946 at San Diego, California. She was reclassified as a medium harbor tug and redesignated YTM-385 in February 1962 while in reserve.

Wannalancet was transferred, on loan, to Venezuela in January 1963. Renamed Fabrio Gallipoli (R-14), she served with the Venezuelan Navy until the late 1970s. She was slated for sale as of November 1978.
