= USS Anamosa =

Tugboat of the United States Navy

History

United States
- Name: USS Anamosa (YTB-409)
- Namesake: One of several variations or transcriptions of the name of a Sauk Indian lady who distinguished herself in the Black Hawk War. Also a town in Jones County, Iowa.
- Builder: Ira Bushey & Sons, Brooklyn, New York
- Laid down: 18 March 1944
- Launched: 24 July 1944
- Commissioned: 28 March 1945
- Reclassified: District Harbor Tug, Medium YTM-409 in February 1962
- Stricken: May 1978
- Identification: IMO number: 8036275
- Fate: Sold for scrapping by the Defense Reutilization and Marketing Service (DRMS), 1 July 1979

General characteristics
- Class & type: Sassaba-class harbor tug
- Type: Harbor Tug
- Displacement: 237 tons
- Length: 100 ft (30 m)
- Beam: 25 ft (7.6 m)
- Draft: 9 ft 7 in (2.92 m)
- Propulsion: Diesel engine, single propeller, 1,200shp
- Speed: 12 kn (22 km/h; 14 mph)
- Complement: 10
- Armament: 2 x .50-caliber machine guns

USS Anamosa (YTB-409) was a Sassaba-class harbor tug that served in the United States Navy from 1945 to 1978.

The Anamosa was assigned to the United States Pacific Fleet (1st Fleet, West Coast) soon after delivery to the Navy. She was at Yokosuka, Japan in 1947 as navy records indicate she was replaced there that year by USS Secota. USS Anamosa was deployed to Naval Station Guam by the beginning of 1948.

Anamosa was re-designated a district harbor tug, medium (YTM) in February 1962.

Her name was struck from the Navy List in May 1978 and she was sold for scrapping by the Defense Reutilization and Marketing Service (DRMS), 1 July 1979.
