= Pawhuska (YTB-822) =

Tugboat of the United States Navy

History

United States
- Namesake: Pawhuska, Oklahoma
- Awarded: 9 August 1971
- Builder: Marinette Marine
- Laid down: 9 January 1973
- Launched: 7 June 1973
- Acquired: 10 September 1973
- In service: 1973
- Out of service: 1995
- Stricken: 28 October 2002
- Identification: MMSI number: 316033712; Callsign: CFA2341
- Fate: Sold into commercial service, 9 September 2005

General characteristics
- Class & type: Natick-class large harbor tug
- Displacement: 286 long tons (291 t) (light); 346 long tons (352 t) (full)
- Length: 108 ft (33 m)
- Beam: 29 ft (8.8 m)
- Draft: 14 ft (4.3 m)
- Propulsion: One diesel propulsion engine, 2000 HP
- Speed: 12 knots (14 mph; 22 km/h)
- Complement: 12
- Armament: None

Pawhuska (YTB-822) was a United States Navy Natick-class large harbor tug named for Pawhuska, Oklahoma.

== Construction ==
The contract for Pawhuska was awarded 9 August 1971. She was laid down on 9 January 1973 at Marinette, Wisconsin, by Marinette Marine and launched 7 June 1973.

== Operational history ==
Stricken from the Navy List 28 October 2002, Pawhuska was sold by Defense Reutilization and Marketing Service (DRMS) 9 September 2005. In commercial service as Teclutsa.
