= USS YP-148 =

Patrol Boat which was active during World War II

- Pre-war photo of YP-148 as Western Queen prior to conversion to patrol boat

History
- Name: YP-148 (ex-Western Queen)
- Builder: Western Boat Building Company, Tacoma
- Completed: 1940
- Acquired: 1941
- Identification: ON 239863; code letters: NURA
- Fate: Sold, 1946

General characteristics
- Type: Patrol boat
- Displacement: 145 gross register tons
- Length: 85 ft (26 m) o/a

USS YP-148 was a converted fishing vessel which served as an auxiliary patrol boat in the U.S. Navy during World War II.

== History ==
She was laid down as seiner at the Tacoma shipyard of Western Boat Building Company for the benefit of MA Petrich. She was completed in 1940 and named Western Queen (ON 239863). In 1941, she was acquired by the U.S. Navy and designated as a Yard Patrol Craft (YP). She was one of the initial ships assigned to the Ralph C. Parker's Alaskan Sector of the 13th Naval District colloquially known as the "Alaskan Navy".

In 1946, she was transferred to the United States Maritime Administration and sold. She was renamed Mary D.
