= Anoka (YTB-810) =

Tugboat of the United States Navy

History

United States
- Awarded: 22 June 1970
- Builder: Peterson Builders, Sturgeon Bay, WI
- Laid down: 5 October 1970
- Launched: 15 April 1971
- Acquired: 31 August 1971
- Stricken: 13 March 2001
- Identification: IMO number: 8980921; MMSI number: 367738450; Callsign: WDI8420
- Fate: Sold 20 November 2001

General characteristics
- Class & type: Natick-class large harbor tug
- Displacement: 282 long tons (287 t) (light); 344 long tons (350 t) (full)
- Length: 109 ft (33 m)
- Beam: 31 ft (9.4 m)
- Draft: 14 ft (4.3 m)
- Speed: 12 knots (14 mph; 22 km/h)
- Complement: 12
- Armament: None

Anoka (YTB-810) was a United States Navy Natick-class large harbor tug named for Anoka, Minnesota.

== Construction ==
The contract for Anoka was awarded 22 June 1970. She was laid down on 5 October 1970 at Sturgeon Bay, Wisconsin, by Peterson Builders and launched 15 April 1971.

== Operational history ==
Anoka was assigned to the 5th Naval District and based at Norfolk, Virginia. She spent her entire Navy career operating as a harbor tug in the lower reaches of the Chesapeake Bay and the estuaries that feed the lower bay.

Stricken from the Navy List 13 March 2001, ex-Anoka was sold by the Defense Reutilization and Marketing Service (DRMS), 20 November 2001, to McAllister Towing, renamed Missy McAllister.
