= USS Dart (YFB-308) =

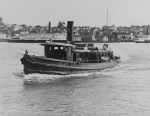

History

United States Navy
- Name: USS Dart
- Builder: Mare Island Navy Yard
- Cost: 15,000 dollars
- Laid down: 6 April 1899
- Launched: 28 February 1900
- Sponsored by: Margaret Fechteler
- Christened: 28 February 1900
- Acquired: 1900
- Commissioned: 9 April 1900
- Decommissioned: 1954
- Homeport: Mare Island Navy Yard
- Fate: Transferred to United States Lighthouse Service on 20 September 1930

United States Lighthouse Service
- Name: USS Locust
- Fate: Transferred to US Coast Guard in 1939

United States Coast Guard
- Name: USS Locust
- Fate: Decommissioned in 1954

General characteristics
- Type: Launch

USS Dart (YFB-308) was a United States Navy ferry launch in service from 1900 to 1930, when she was transferred to the United States Lighthouse Service, and renamed the Locust, she was later transferred to the United States Coast Guard, until she was decommissioned in 1954.

== Construction ==
Dart was sponsored by Miss Margaret Fechteler, and cost 15,000 dollars to build. She was laid down on 6 April 1899, by the Mare Island Navy Yard, in Vallejo, California. She was launched, and christened, on 28 February 1900, and commissioned on 9 April 1900. She was 71 feet 10 inches (21.89 m) long, and 16 feet 7 inches (5.05 m) wide.

== Service history ==
Dart was attached to the Mare Island Navy Yard on 9 April 1900, where she served until 1930. She was employed as a ferry between the Mare Island Navy Yard and Vallejo, California, and also as a stand-by fire boat. On 20 September 1930 she was transferred to the United States Lighthouse Service, where she was renamed to Locust, and served as a buoy boat for the 18th Lighthouse District at San Francisco from 1931 to 1939, when she was transferred to the US Coast Guard, as the US Lighthouse Service was merging into the USCG. She continued to serve in the 18th Lighthouse district until she was decommissioned in 1954.
