= USS Skenandoa (YT-336) =

Tugboat of the United States Navy

History

United States
- Name: Matilda Foss (1909–1943); Skenandoa (1943–1946)
- Namesake: Skenandoa (1710-1816)
- Completed: 1909
- Acquired: 11 February 1943
- Reclassified: From harbor tug, YT-336, to medium harbor tug, YTM-336, 15 May 1944
- Fate: Returned to owner 25 January 1946

General characteristics
- Type: Harbor tug
- Length: 91 ft 0 in (27.74 m)

USS Skenandoa (YT-336), later YTM-336, was a United States Navy harbor tug named for Oneida chief, Skenandoa.

Built in 1909 as a commercial tug, Mathilda Foss was acquired by the U.S. Navy for World War II service on 11 February 1943 and was placed in service as Skenandoa.

Skenandoa spent her navy career operating in the Hawaiian Islands. She was reclassified as a medium harbor tug and redesignated YTM-336 on 15 May 1944.

The navy returned Skenandoa to her owners on 25 January 1946.
