= Natchitoches (YTB-799) =

Tugboat of the United States Navy

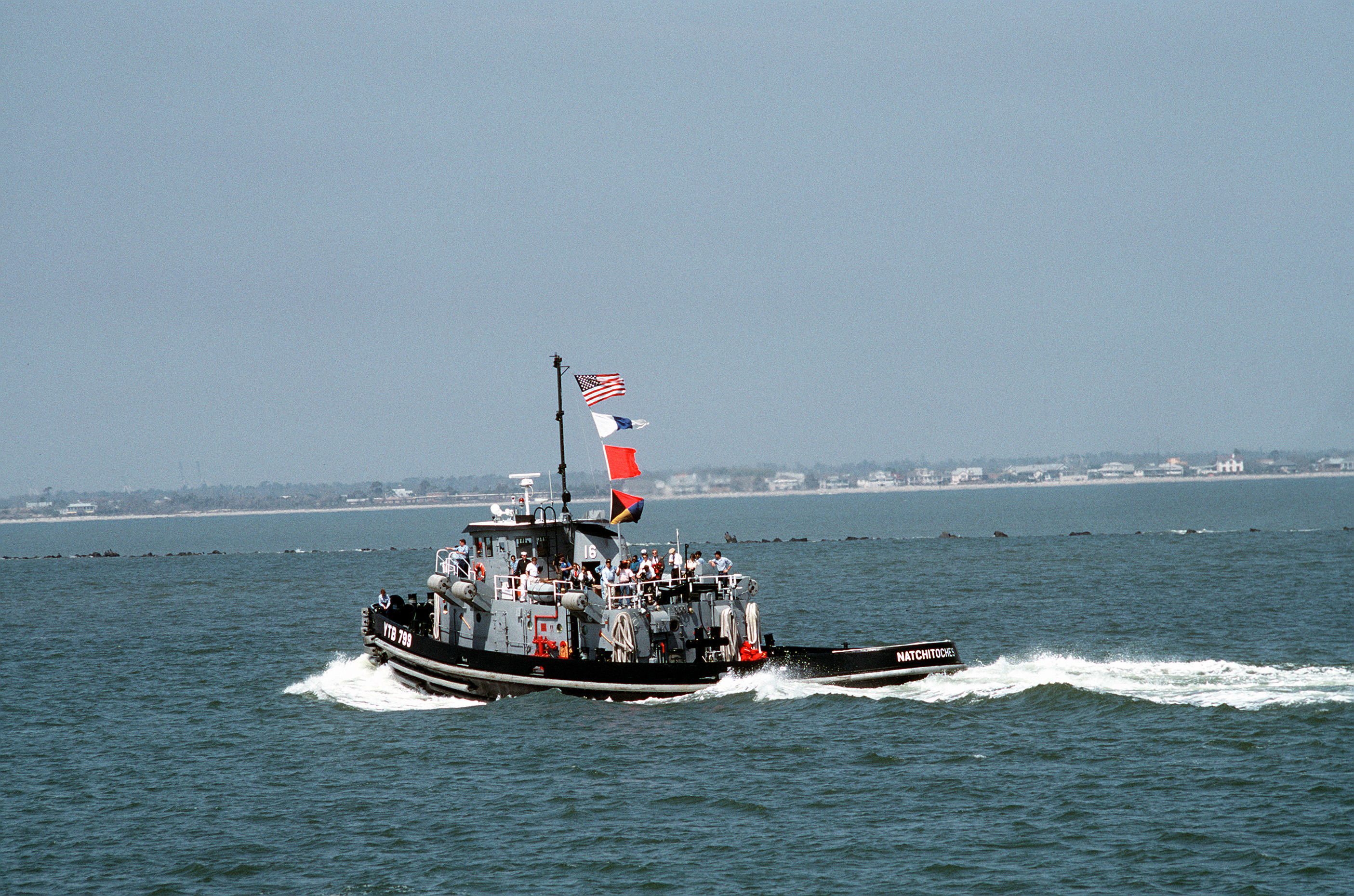
- Natchitoches (YTB-799) heads across Charleston harbor with reporters and cameramen aboard.

History

United States
- Ordered: 2 May 1968
- Builder: Southern Shipbuilding Corp, Slidell, Louisiana
- Laid down: 24 June 1968
- Launched: 9 January 1969
- Acquired: 22 May 1969
- Stricken: 13 October 1995
- Identification: MMSI number: 366999402; Callsign: AEHT
- Fate: Transferred to the US Army, Corps Of Engineers, 28 December 1995, renamed D. L. Billmaier

General characteristics
- Class & type: Natick-class large harbor tug
- Displacement: 283 long tons (288 t) (light); 356 long tons (362 t) (full)
- Length: 109 ft (33 m)
- Beam: 31 ft (9.4 m)
- Draft: 14 ft (4.3 m)
- Speed: 12 knots (14 mph; 22 km/h)
- Complement: 12
- Armament: None

Natchitoches (YTB-799) was a United States Navy Natick-class large harbor tug named for Natchitoches, Louisiana.

== Construction ==
The contract for Natchitoches was awarded 2 May 1968. She was laid down on 24 June 1968 at Slidell, Louisiana, by Southern Shipbuilding Corp and launched 9 January 1969.

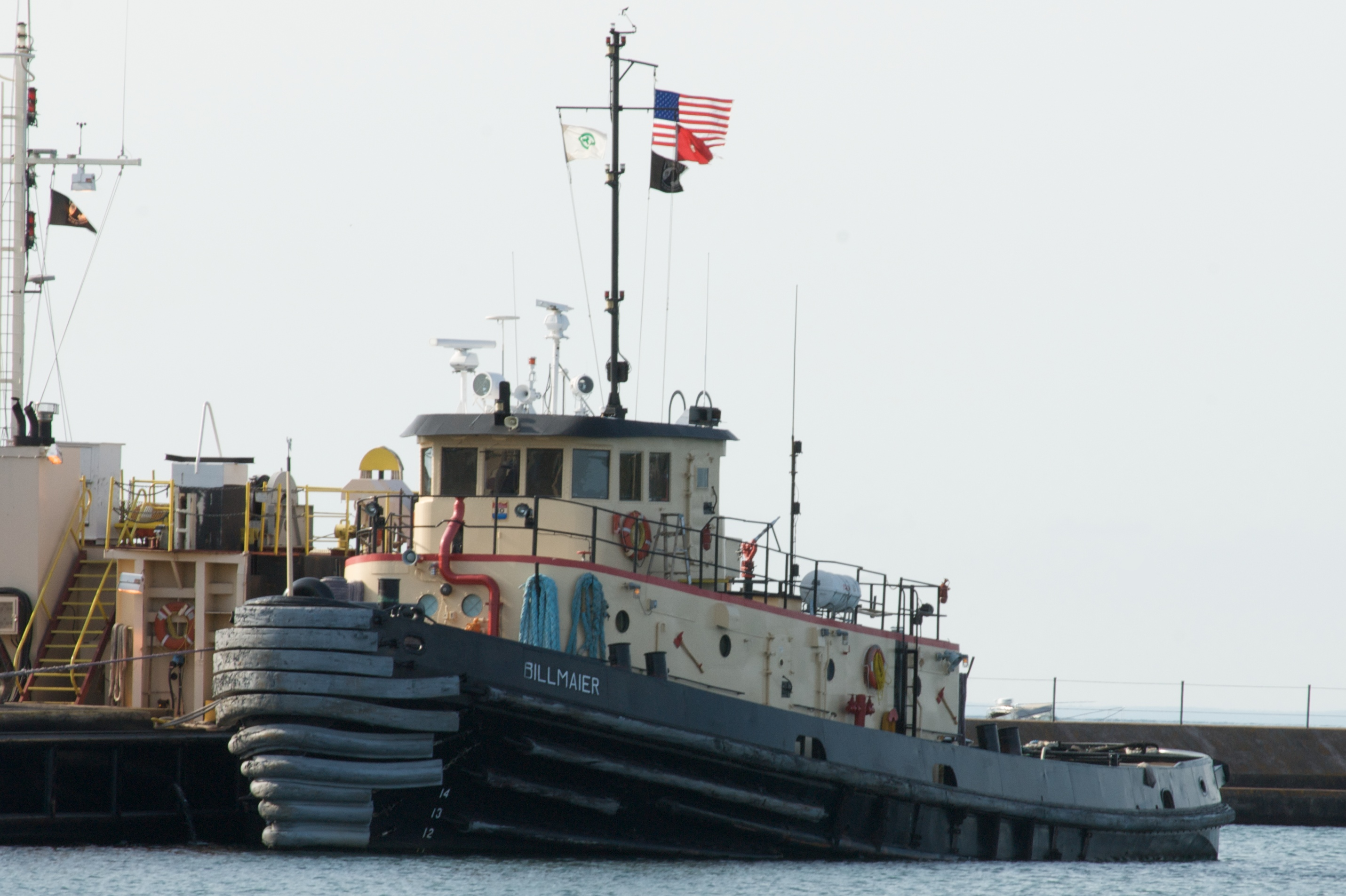
Billmaier with the crane barge H. J. Schwartz in Two Harbors, Minnesota

== Operational history ==
Placed in service 29 May 1969, Natchitoches assigned to Boston. She served in Boston, Naval Station Puget Sound, Everett, Washington, and 6th Naval District at Charleston, South Carolina until her retirement in 1995.

Stricken from the Navy List 13 October 1995, she was transferred to the United States Army Corps of Engineers 28 December 1995. Ex-Natchitoches was renamed D. L. Billmaier.
