= 75-foot patrol boat =

American Coast Guard patrol craft

Six-Bitter
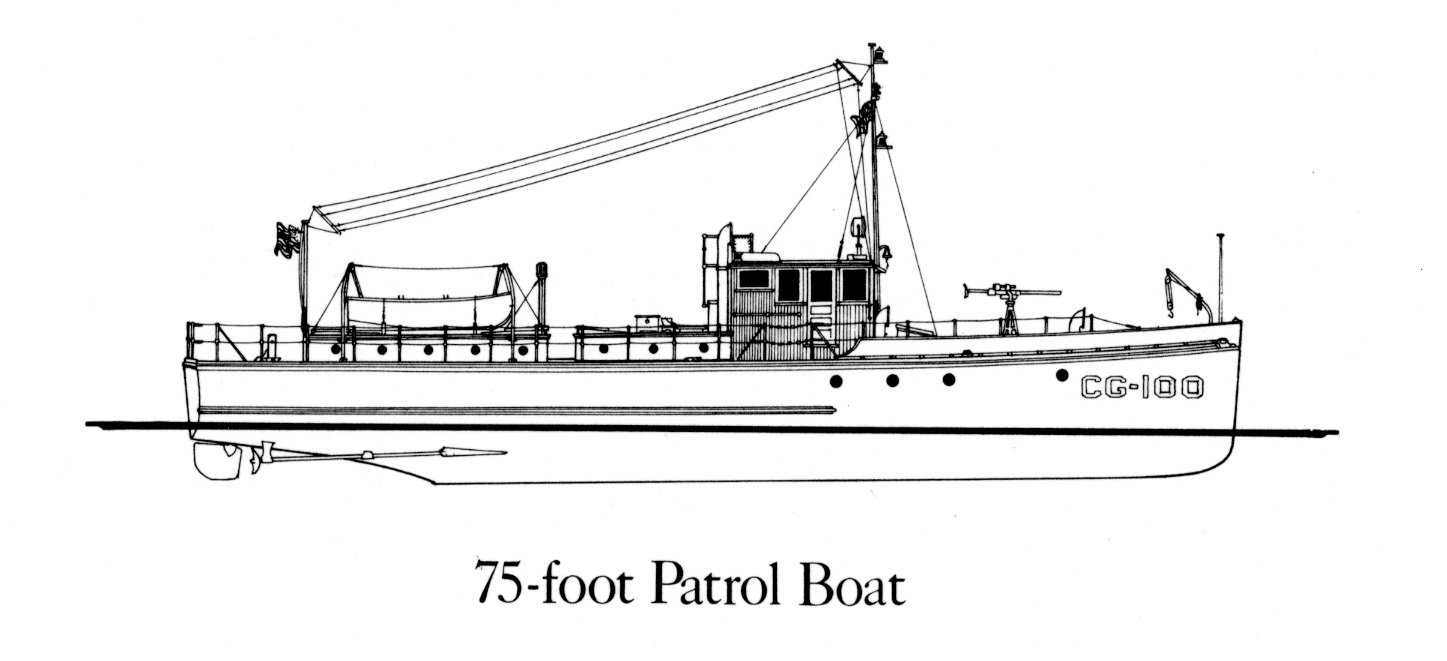

Class overview
- Name: CG-100-class patrol boat
- Operators: United States Coast Guard
- Succeeded by: 400-series patrol boat
- Built: 1924–1925
- In service: 1924–1946 (U.S. Coast Guard); 1934–1947 (U.S. Navy)
- Completed: 203

General characteristics
- Class & type: 75 foot patrol boat
- Displacement: 37 T
- Length: 74 ft 11 in (22.83 m)
- Beam: 13 ft 7.5 in (4.153 m)
- Draught: 4 ft 0 in (1.22 m)
- Propulsion: Twin Sterling 200-hp 6-cyl gasoline engines
- Speed: 15 knots
- Complement: 8
- Armament: 1 x 1-pounder gun forward; various other small arms.

The United States Coast Guard wooden-hulled 75-foot patrol boats (also called "Six-Bitters") were built during Prohibition to help interdict alcohol smugglers ("rum runners"). Their nickname was derived from the slang term "six bits" meaning 75 U.S. cents.

== Design and construction ==
During Prohibition, the U.S. Coast Guard had a need for picket boats to help intercept smugglers ferrying alcohol from offshore freighters to the mainland. The Coast Guard response was to develop a two-tiered plan. Larger cutters were to be stationed offshore to find "mother ships" and interdict them if they strayed inside U.S. territorial waters (mother ships were in almost all cases of foreign registry and could not be boarded while in international waters) while smaller, faster patrol boats were used as picket ships to intercept high speed boats or "rum-runners" that made the transfer of contraband to the shore. The Coast Guard developed the 75-foot patrol boat to serve the offshore role and the 36-foot picket boat to serve the inshore role. A basic design for these ships was developed by naval architect Alfred Hansen of the Coast Guard Office of Construction and Repair and then the final design was completed in April 1924 by naval architect John Trumpy of the Mathis Yacht Building Company in Camden, New Jersey. (Trumpy also designed Sequoia II, which later became the official U.S. presidential yacht and which was completed soon after the Mathis Yacht Building Company finished construction of thirty Six-Bitters for the Coast Guard.)

The patrol vessels were designed to be operated by a crew of eight and were able to carry enough provisions and fuel for up to a week at sea. The frames and 5.75-inch keel were white oak, while the bulwarks and 1.375-inch planking were either fir or yellow pine. To speed construction, the hull contracts were divided between sixteen commercial shipyards (which built 200 boats) and the Portsmouth Naval Shipyard (which built three boats). The hulls were unnamed, but instead assigned numbers from CG-100 through CG-302. Hull prices varied from $18,675 to $26,900 depending on shipyard. The six-cylinder gasoline engines (two per boat) were purchased by the Coast Guard from the Sterling Engine Company of Buffalo, New York for $4,129 each. Although slower than most rumrunners at 15 knots, the class was well-designed, durable, and able to remain on patrol for days.

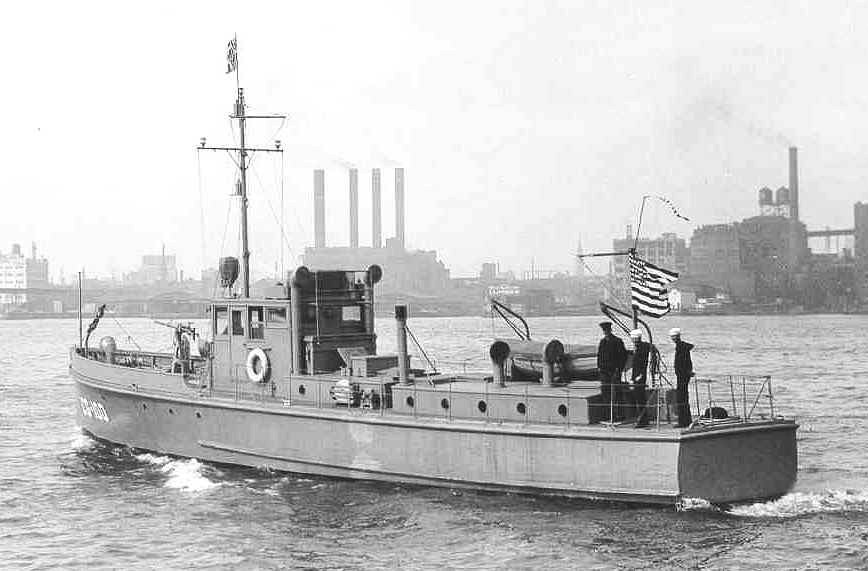
CG-100 (later USS YP-67) in 1928

CG-100 was completed first and commissioned on 21 October 1924. CG-302 was completed last and commissioned on 18 July 1925. All 203 patrol boats were put into service over a nine-month period, at an average of five per week.

== Service history ==
Twenty-five Six-Bitters were built in West Coast shipyards and deployed along the Pacific Coast. Another twenty-five patrol boats were built in Michigan and intended for deployment on the Great Lakes. The remaining boats were built in East Coast shipyards and most of these were deployed along the Gulf and Atlantic Coasts.

After the end of Prohibition, forty-six of the Six-Bitters were transferred to the United States Navy in 1934. They were redesignated as yard patrol craft and assigned new numbers ranging between YP-5 and YP-67. About fourteen patrol boats were transferred to other federal government agencies. Some were sold and others continued in active service through the end of World War II. The last remaining Six-Bitter in Coast Guard service was sold in 1946. The last remaining patrol boat in Navy service was sold in 1947.

== Shipyards ==
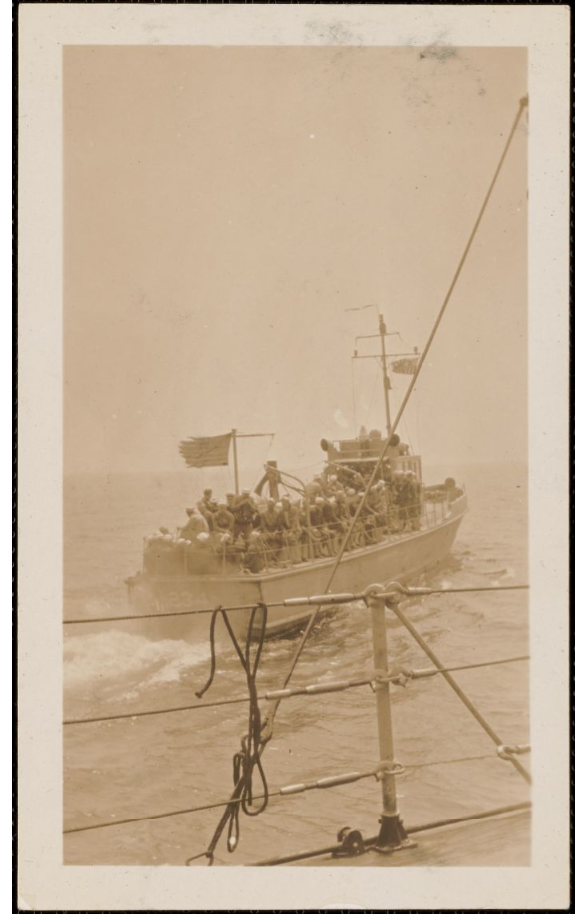
CG-234 after a rescue, taken from CGC Manning in 1927

- A. W. de Young Boat & Shipbuilding Company (Alameda, California)
- Chance Marine Construction Company (Annapolis, Maryland)
- Colonna's Shipyard Inc. (Norfolk, Virginia)
- Crowninshield Shipbuilding Company (Fall River, Massachusetts)
- Dachel-Carter Boat Company (Benton Harbor, Michigan)
- Defoe Boat and Motor Works (Bay City, Michigan)
- Gibbs Gas Engine Company (Jacksonville, Florida)
- Kingston Drydock and Construction Company (Kingston, New York)
- Lake Union Dry Dock Company (Seattle, Washington)
- Luder's Marine Construction Company, (Stamford, Connecticut)
- Mathis Yacht Building Company (Camden, New Jersey)
- New York Yacht, Launch & Engine Company (Bronx, New York City)
- Rice Brothers Corporation (East Boothbay, Maine)
- Southern Shipyard Corporation (Newport News, Virginia)
- T. H. Soule Shipyard (Freeport, Maine)
- Portsmouth Naval Shipyard (Portsmouth, New Hampshire)
- Vinyard Shipbuilding Company (Milford, Delaware)

== See also ==
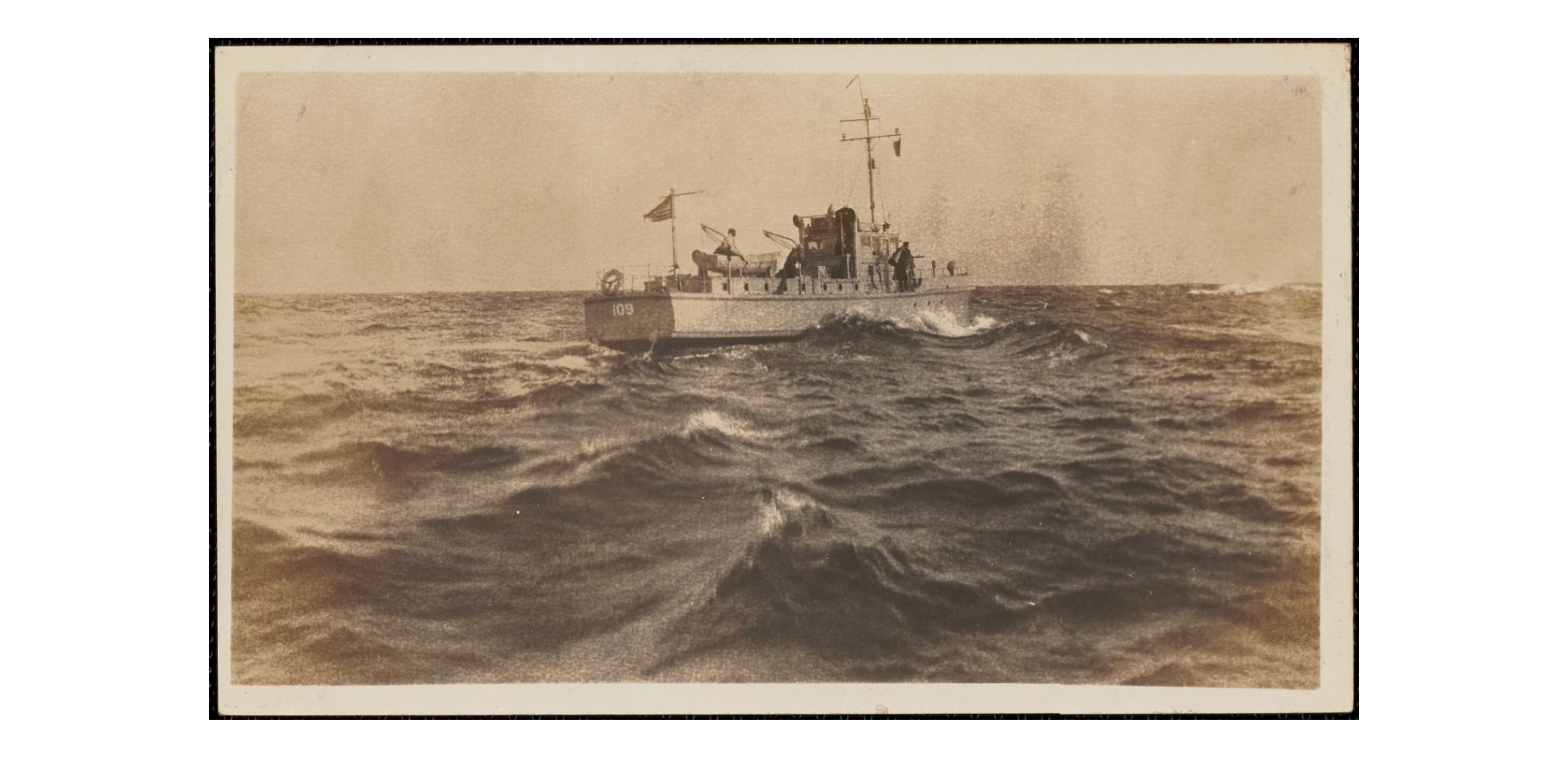
CG-109 taken from CGC Manning in 1927

- CG-107
- CG-108
- CG-113
- USS YP-45 (ex CG-133)
- USS YP-15 (ex CG-149)
- USS YP-19 (ex CG-177)
- USS YP-49 (ex CG-182)
- USS YP-10 (ex CG-194)
- USS Milan (YP-6) (ex CG-209)
- CG-249
- USS YP-26 (ex CG-252)
- CG-74339 (ex CG-255)
- USS YP-51 (ex CG-261)
- USS YP-18 (ex CG-263)
- USS YP-16 (ex CG-267)
- USS YP-17 (ex CG-275)

== Gallery ==
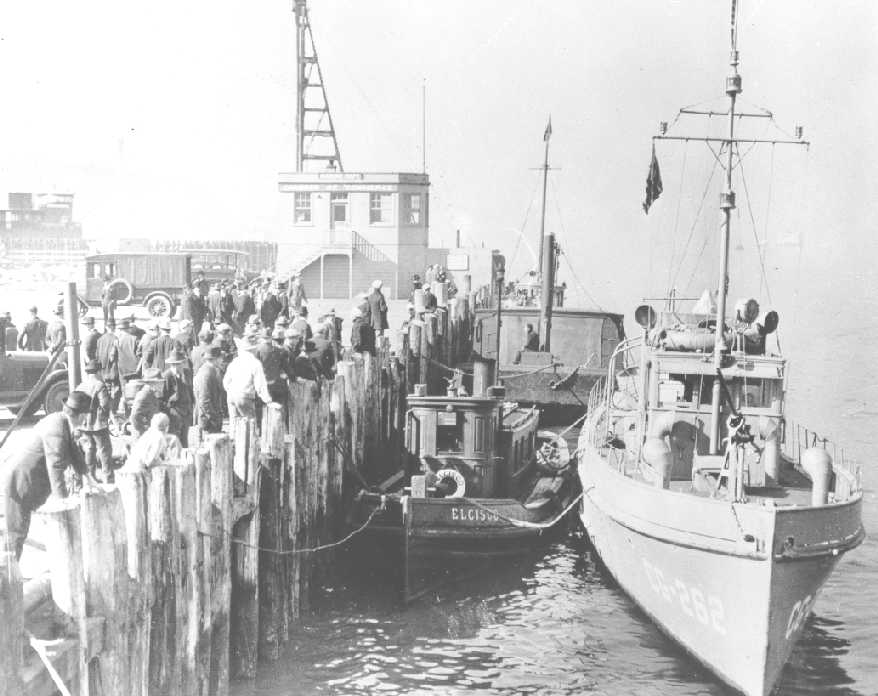
CG-262 with seized tug Elcisco and barge Redwood City docked in San Francisco Harbor, 1927.

== Sources ==
- Flynn, James T. Jr. (23 June 2014), "Birth of the Six Bitters - The Start of Prohibition Enforcement Afloat in Earnest" (PDF), U. S. Coast Guard Small Cutters and Patrol Boats 1915 – 2012: Vessel of less than 100-feet in Length, U.S. Department of Defense, pp. 3–13
