= USS YP-19 =

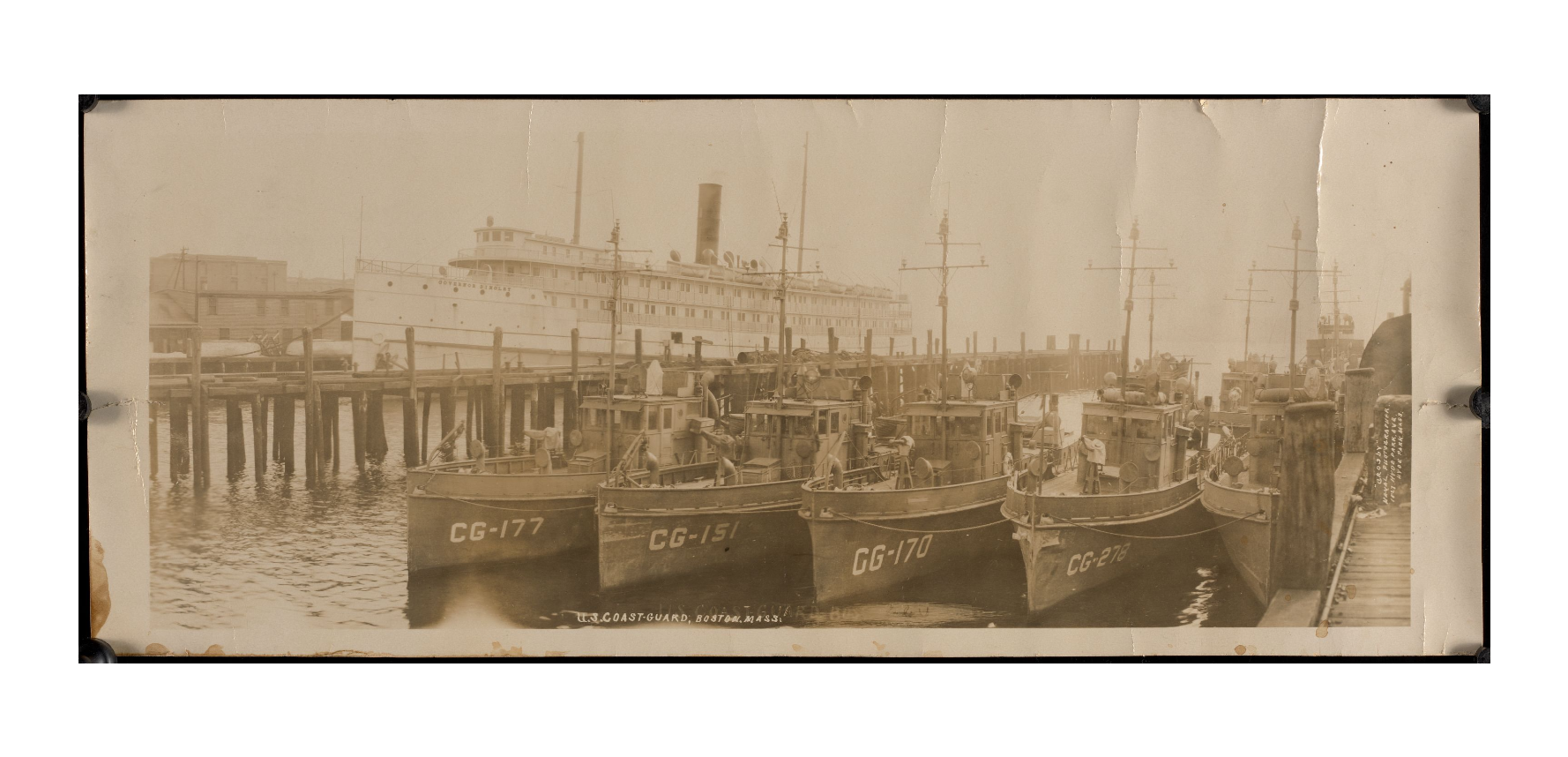
- CG-177 with CG-151, CG-170, CG-278 in front of Eastern Steamship Lines SS Governor Dingley at Boston Harbor, c.1925-1927

United States Coast Guard
- Name: CG-177
- Ordered: 1924
- Builder: Rice Brothers Corporation, Boothbay, Maine
- Commissioned: 1925
- Fate: Transferred to United States Navy, 18 April 1934
- Notes: Call sign: NROK

United States Navy
- Name: YP-19
- Acquired: 18 April 1934
- Reclassified: YP-19
- Stricken: 17 September 1945
- Home port: Key West, Florida
- Honours and awards: American Defense Service Medal; American Campaign Medal; World War II Victory Medal
- Fate: Sold, 1946
- Notes: Call sign: NIPX

General characteristics
- Tonnage: 37.5 GRT
- Length: 74.9 ft (22.8 m) o/a
- Beam: 13.6 ft (4.1 m)
- Draught: 3.75 ft (1.14 m)
- Installed power: 500 SHP
- Propulsion: two Sterling 6-cylinder gasoline engines, two propellers
- Complement: 8
- Armament: 1 x 1-pounder gun forward

USS YP-19 was a wooden-hulled patrol vessel in commission in the fleet of the United States Coast Guard as CG-177 from 1925 to 1934, and in the fleet of the United States Navy as YP-19 from 1934 until 1945.

== History ==
She was laid down at the Boothbay, Maine shipyard of the Rice Brothers Corporation, one of 203 "Six-Bitters" ordered by the United States Coast Guard. She was designed for long-range picket and patrol duty during Prohibition for postings 20 to 30 miles from shore. The date of her launching and completion is uncertain although the class design was finalized in April 1924 and all of the Six-Bitters were commissioned by 1925. She was commissioned in 1925 as CG-177 and stationed at Boston, Massachusetts from 1925 to 1927 and Biloxi, Mississippi from 1927 to 1934. On 18 April 1934, she was transferred to the United States Navy and designated as a Yard Patrol Craft (YP). She was assigned to the 8th Naval District where she trained reservists. During World War II she was assigned to the Inshore Patrol of the Gulf Sea Frontier, 8th Naval District based at Key West, Florida and later Miami from 17 June 1942. Soon after the end of World War II on 2 September 1945, she was struck from the Naval List on 17 September 1945.

She was transferred to the War Shipping Administration in May 1946 and sold. She finished her days as fishing boat Frankie Rosseau (ON 250611) and later Marie Louise. She fell out of documentation in 1948.
