= USS YP-51 =

United States Coast Guard vessel

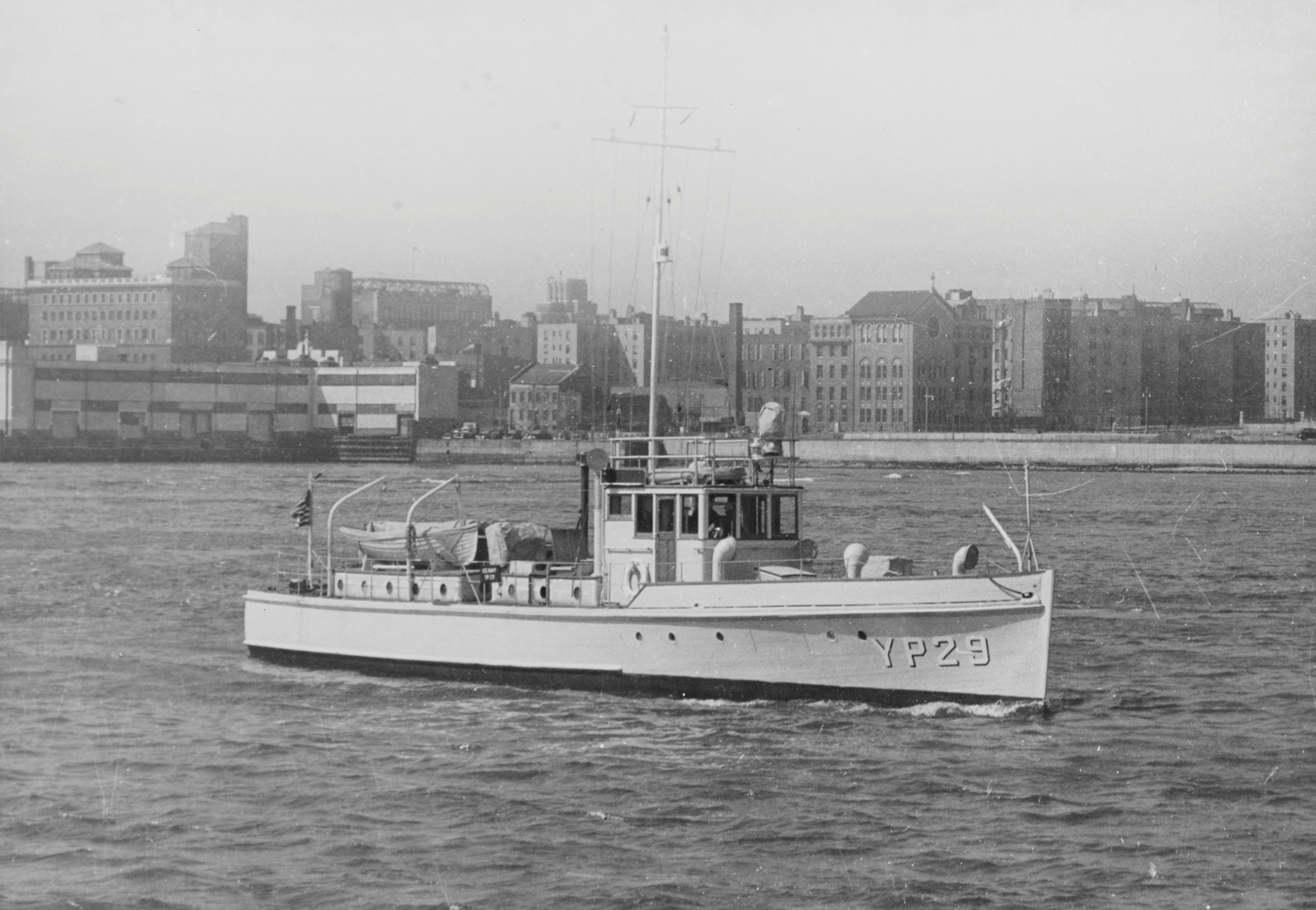
- Sister ship YP-29 (ex CG-116) in 1941

United States Coast Guard
- Name: CG-261
- Ordered: 1924
- Builder: A. W. de Young Boat & Shipbuilding Company, Alameda, California
- Launched: 24 November 1924
- Commissioned: 1925
- Identification: Code letters: NRYC
- Fate: Transferred to the Department of Justice, May 1933 transferred to United States Navy, 1934

United States Navy
- Acquired: 1934
- Reclassified: YP-51
- Stricken: 11 October 1945
- Honours and awards: American Defense Service Medal; American Campaign Medal; World War II Victory Medal
- Fate: Sold to the private sector, 1949, out of documentation, 1952

General characteristics
- Tonnage: 37.5 GRT
- Length: 74.9 ft (22.8 m) o/a
- Beam: 13.6 ft (4.1 m)
- Draught: 3.75 ft (1.14 m)
- Installed power: 500 SHP
- Propulsion: two Sterling 6-cylinder gasoline engines, two propellers
- Complement: 8
- Armament: 1 x 1-pounder gun forward

USS YP-51 was a wooden-hulled patrol vessel in commission in the fleet of the United States Coast Guard as CG-261 from 1925 to 1934, and in the fleet of the United States Navy as YP-51 from 1934 until 1945.

== History ==
She was laid down at the Alameda, California shipyard of the A. W. de Young Boat & Shipbuilding Company, one of 203 "Six-Bitters" ordered by the United States Coast Guard. She was designed for long-range picket and patrol duty during Prohibition for postings 20 to 30 miles from shore. She was launched on 24 November 1924. The date of her completion is uncertain although the class design was finalized in April 1924 and all of the Six-Bitters were commissioned by 1925. She was commissioned in 1925 as CG-261. In May 1933, she was transferred to the Department of Justice. In 1934, she was transferred to the United States Navy and designated as a Yard Patrol Craft (YP). She served in the 12th Naval District at Mare Island in Vallejo, California training reservists until the advent of World War II where she was assigned to the Inshore Patrol, 12th Naval District. She was decommissioned sometime thereafter and sold in August 1949 and renamed the Milliquin (ON 257116). She was resold in November 1949 and renamed The Chaser. She was out of documentation in 1952.
