= USS YP-26 =

Patrol vessel of the United States Navy

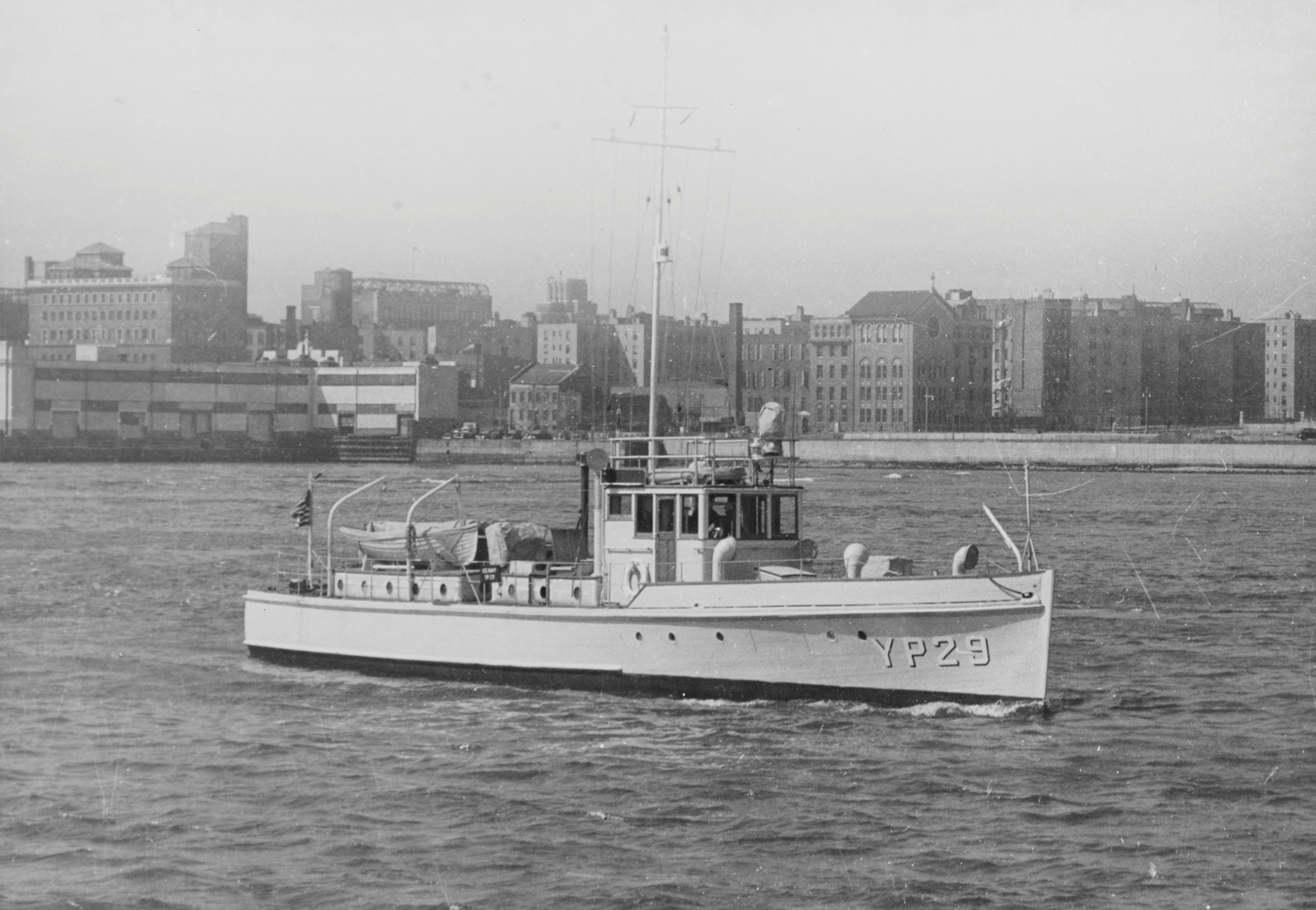
- Sister ship YP-29 (ex CG-116) in 1941

History

United States
- Name: CG-252; YP-26
- Builder: Gibbs Gas Engine Co., Jacksonville, Florida
- Launched: 1925
- Identification: Call sign: NRXS; (pre-WWII)
- Fate: Undetermined explosion, 19 November 1942, Canal Zone, Panama

General characteristics
- Class & type: 75 foot patrol boat
- Displacement: 37 T
- Length: 74 ft 11 in (22.83 m)
- Beam: 13 ft 7.5 in (4.153 m)
- Draught: 4 ft 0 in (1.22 m)
- Propulsion: Twin Sterling 200-hp 6-cyl gasoline engines, capable of ~12 kts.
- Complement: 8
- Armament: 1 x 1-pounder gun forward; various other small arms.

YP-26 was a former U.S. Coast Guard wooden patrol boat which saw later duty with the U.S. Navy until destroyed in a 1942 accident.

== History ==
To combat the smuggling of alcohol during Prohibition following passage of the Volstead Act, the United States Coast Guard ordered 203 purpose-built 75-foot wooden-hulled patrol boats in the 1924. These became known as the "Six-Bitters", from the slang term "six bits" meaning 75 U.S. cents. They were unnamed and numbered CG-100 through CG-302. "Their top speed was about 12 knots. Their 8 man crews consisted of a Chief Boatswain's Mate, or a Warrant Boatswain as OIC, along with two lower rated BM's, two Seaman and an engine room crew of a Chief Motor Machinist's Mate, and two lower rated MM's."

Originally delivered by the Gibbs Gas Engine Co., Jacksonville, Florida, in 1925, one of 20 of the design produced by the yard, as CG-252, the vessel became excess to Coast Guard needs when ratification of the 21st Amendment repealed Prohibition in December 1933, and a number of the class were turned over to the U.S. Navy. CG-252 was transferred in 1934, redesignated a Yard Patrol vessel, becoming YP-26.

=== Beaching ===
On Saturday night, 9 November 1940, while serving as a Naval Reserve training ship, YP-26 was beached inside the breakwater at Port Washington, Wisconsin, after striking a submerged rock in a storm, reported Lieut. Edward W. Crandall, of Great Lakes naval training station, on 10 November. "The crew of 14, including Ensign Harl Day, who captained the ship, waded ashore in three feet of water and spent the night in a hotel."

=== Demise ===
Transferred to duty in the Panama Canal Zone by 1941, YP-26 was destroyed by an explosion of an unknown cause, while hauled out on the marine railway at Cristóbal, Colón, on 19 November 1942.
