= USCG CG-74339 =

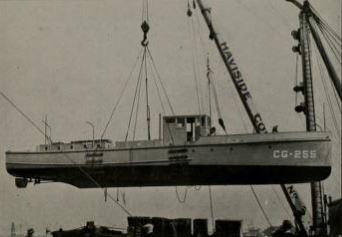
- CG-255 being lowered at the A. W. de Young Boat & Shipbuilding Company, 1924

United States Coast Guard
- Name: CG–255 (1925–1943); CG–74339 (1943–1947)
- Ordered: 1924
- Builder: A. W. de Young Boat & Shipbuilding Company, Alameda, California
- Laid down: 18 August 1924
- Launched: 25 November 1924
- Completed: 26 December 1924
- Commissioned: 1924/1925
- Decommissioned: 1947
- Stricken: 1947
- Identification: Code letters (pre-war): NRXW; Code letters (WW II): NRYW
- Fate: Decommissioned 1947

General characteristics
- Tonnage: 37.5 GRT
- Length: 74.9 ft (22.8 m) o/a
- Beam: 13.6 ft (4.1 m)
- Draught: 3.75 ft (1.14 m)
- Installed power: 500 SHP
- Propulsion: two Sterling 6-cylinder gasoline engines, two propellers
- Complement: 8
- Armament: 1 x 1-pounder gun forward

CG-74339 (ex CG-255) was a wooden-hulled patrol vessel in commission in the fleet of the United States Coast Guard.

== History ==
She was laid down at the Alameda, California shipyard of the A. W. de Young Boat & Shipbuilding Company, one of 203 "Six-Bitters" ordered by the United States Coast Guard, 10 of which were built by de Young. She was designed for long-range picket and patrol duty during Prohibition for postings 20 to 30 miles from shore. She was laid down on 18 August 1924, launched on 25 November 1924, and delivered 26 December 1924. She was commissioned in 1924/1925 as CG-255. By 1943, during World War II, she was designated CG-74339 (the "74" referring to her length of 74 feet 11 inches). She was decommissioned for disposal in 1947.
