= USS YP-15 =

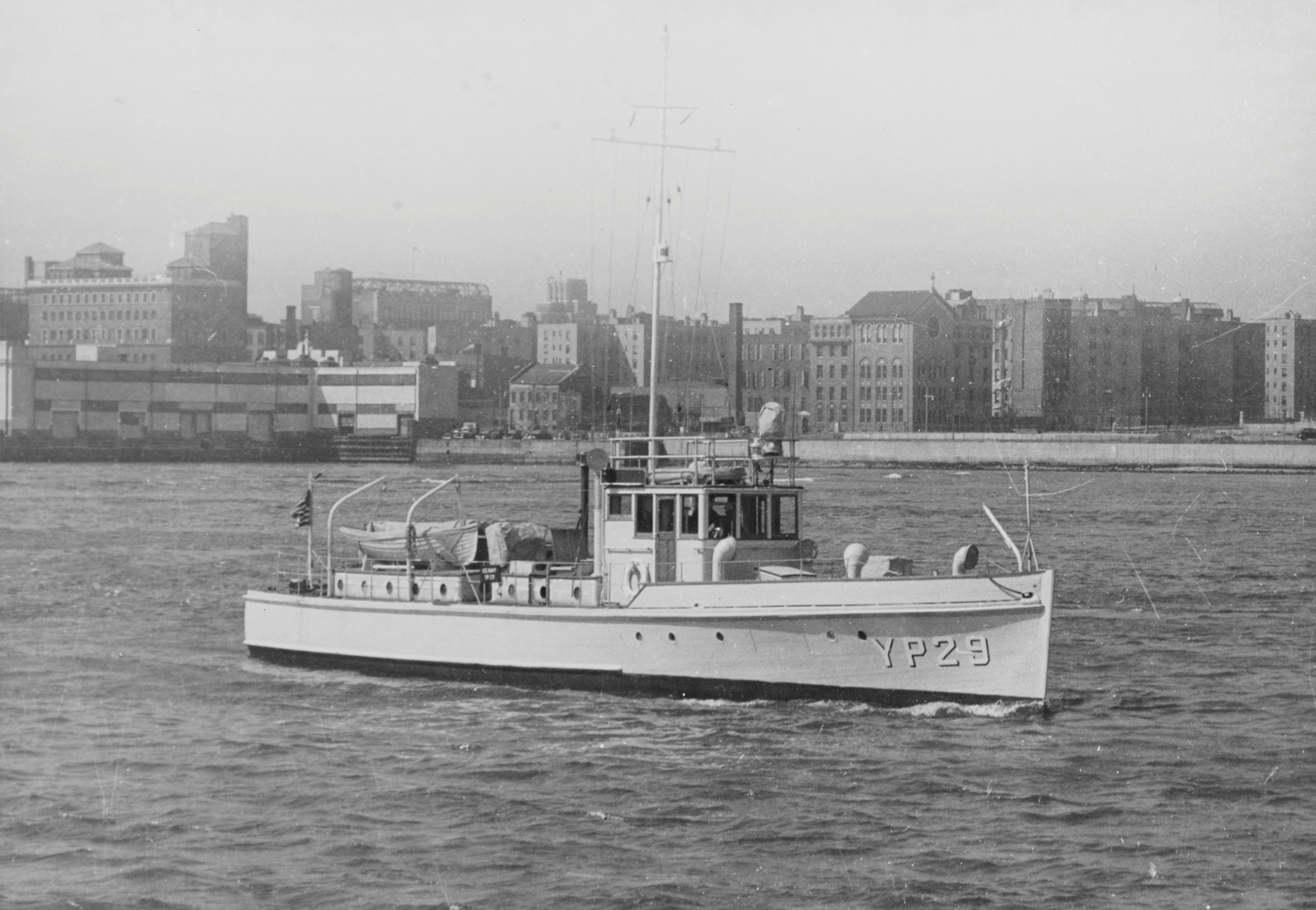
- Sister ship YP-29 (ex CG-116) in 1941

United States Coast Guard
- Name: CG-149
- Ordered: 1924
- Builder: Dachel-Carter Boat Company, Benton Harbor, Michigan
- Commissioned: 1925
- Identification: Call sign: NIDQ
- Fate: transferred to United States Navy, 15 November 1933

United States
- Name: YP-15
- Acquired: 15 November 1933
- Reclassified: YP-15
- Stricken: 11 October 1945
- Homeport: Boston, Massachusetts (1933-1943) Newport, Rhode Island (1942-1944) Portland, Maine (1944-1945)
- Identification: code letters: NIDQ
- Honours and awards: American Defense Service Medal; American Campaign Medal; World War II Victory Medal
- Fate: sold to War Shipping Administration, July 1946; scrapped, 1964

General characteristics
- Tonnage: 37.5 GRT
- Length: 74.9 ft (22.8 m) o/a
- Beam: 13.6 ft (4.1 m)
- Draught: 3.75 ft (1.14 m)
- Installed power: 500 SHP
- Propulsion: two Sterling 6-cylinder gasoline engines, two propellers
- Complement: 8
- Armament: 1 x 1-pounder gun forward

USS YP-15 was a wooden-hulled patrol vessel in commission in the fleet of the United States Coast Guard as CG-149 from 1925 to 1933, and in the fleet of the United States Navy as YP-15 from 1933 until 1945.

== History ==
She was laid down at the Benton Harbor, Michigan shipyard of the Dachel-Carter Boat Company, one of 203 "Six-Bitters" ordered by the United States Coast Guard. She was designed for long-range picket and patrol duty during Prohibition for postings 20 to 30 miles from shore. The date of her launching and completion is uncertain although the class design was finalized in April 1924 and all of the Six-Bitters were commissioned by 1925. She was commissioned in 1925 as CG-149. On 15 November 1933, she was transferred to the United States Navy and designated as a Yard Patrol Craft (YP). She was assigned to the First Naval District where she trained reservists. In 1942, she was assigned to Newport, Rhode Island. In April 1944, she was assigned to Portland, Maine. She was struck from the Naval List on 11 October 1945 and sold to the War Shipping Administration in July 1946. In 1946, she was sold to the private sector, renamed Lady Pauline (ON 250877) and thereafter had a number of owners. She was scrapped in 1964.
