= USS YP-10 =

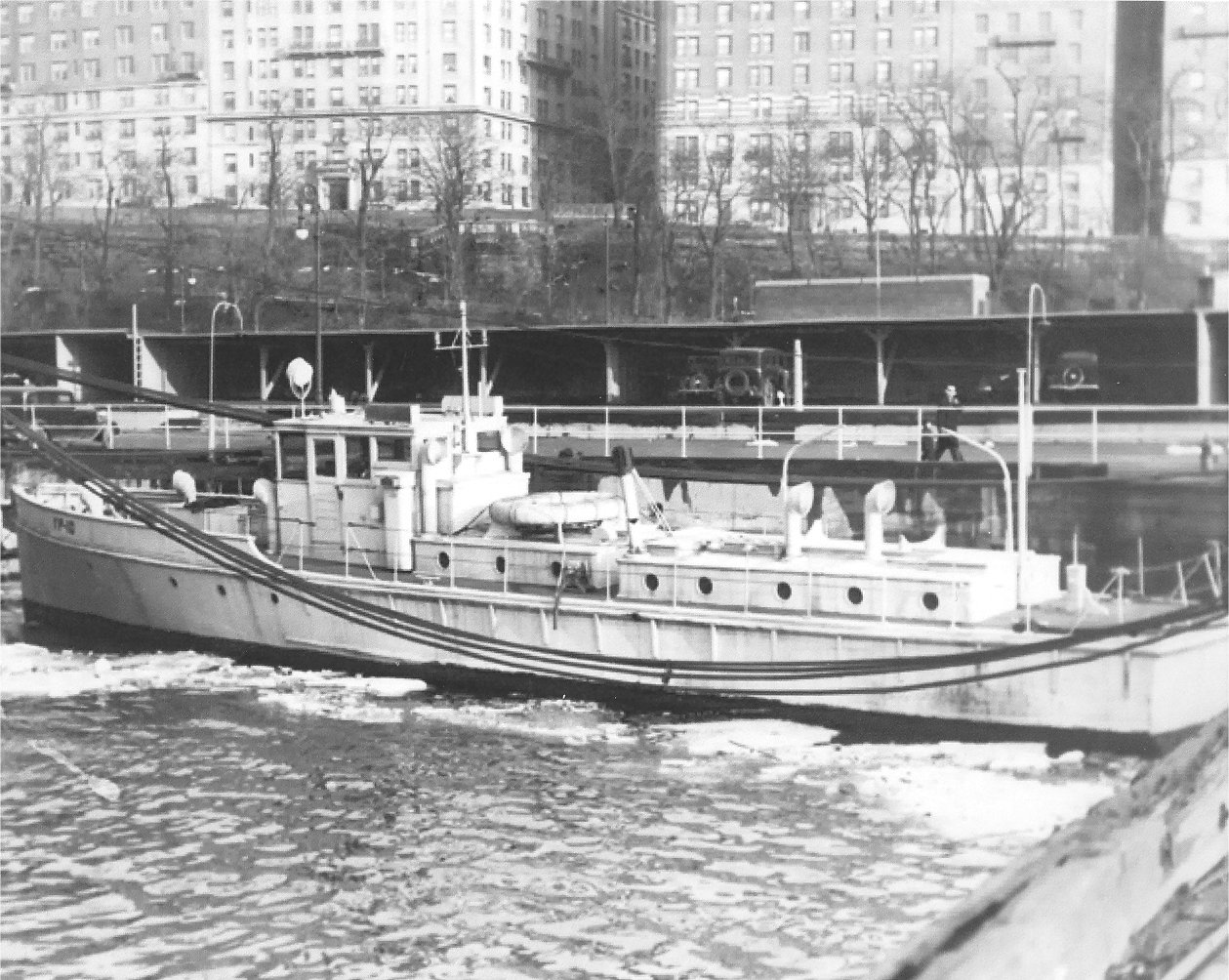
- YP-10 (ex CG-194) in Manhattan, 1934-1941

United States Coast Guard
- Name: CG-194
- Ordered: 1924
- Builder: Chance Marine Construction Company, Annapolis, Maryland
- Commissioned: 1925
- Home port: New York City
- Identification: code letters: NALQ (pre-war)
- Fate: Transferred to United States Navy, 1 January 1934

United States Navy
- Name: YP-10
- Acquired: 1 January 1934
- Reclassified: YP-10
- Fate: Sold, December 1941

General characteristics
- Tonnage: 37.5 GRT
- Length: 74.9 ft (22.8 m) o/a
- Beam: 13.6 ft (4.1 m)
- Draught: 3.75 ft (1.14 m)
- Installed power: 500 SHP
- Propulsion: two Sterling 6-cylinder gasoline engines, two propellers
- Complement: 8
- Armament: 1 x 1-pounder gun forward

USS YP-10 was a wooden-hulled patrol vessel in commission in the fleet of the United States Coast Guard as CG-194 from 1925 to 1934, and in the fleet of the United States Navy as YP-10 from 1934 until 1941.

== History ==
She was laid down at the Annapolis, Maryland shipyard of Chance Marine Construction Company, one of 203 "Six-Bitters" ordered by the United States Coast Guard. She was designed for long-range picket and patrol duty during Prohibition for postings 20 to 30 miles from shore. The date of her launching and completion is uncertain although the class design was finalized in April 1924 and all of the Six-Bitters were commissioned by 1925. She was commissioned in 1925 as CG-194. On 1 January 1934, she was transferred to the United States Navy and designated as a Yard Patrol Craft (YP) and assigned to the 3rd Naval District at New York City where she trained reservists. In late 1940, she was transferred to the Panama Canal Zone, Fifteenth Naval District. She was sold in December 1941.
