= USCG CG-107 =

United States Coast Guard
- Name: CG-107
- Ordered: 1924
- Builder: Mathis Yacht Building Company, Camden, New Jersey
- Commissioned: 1924/1925
- Decommissioned: 1932/1933
- Stricken: 1932/1933
- Identification: code letters: NAKZ

General characteristics
- Tonnage: 37.5 GRT
- Length: 74.9 ft (22.8 m) o/a
- Beam: 13.6 ft (4.1 m)
- Draught: 3.75 ft (1.14 m)
- Installed power: 500 SHP
- Propulsion: two Sterling 6-cylinder gasoline engines, two propellers
- Complement: 8
- Armament: 1 x 1-pounder gun forward

CG-107 was a wooden-hulled patrol vessel in commission in the fleet of the United States Coast Guard.

== History ==
She was laid down at the Camden, New Jersey shipyard of Mathis Yacht Building Company, one of 203 "Six-Bitters" ordered by the United States Coast Guard, 30 of which were built by Mathis. She was designed for long-range picket and patrol duty during Prohibition for postings 20 to 30 miles from shore. The date of her launching and completion is uncertain although the class design was finalized in April 1924 and all of the Six-Bitters were commissioned by 1925. She was commissioned in 1924/1925 as CG-107. She was struck from the register in 1932/1933.
