= USS YP-49 =

US wooden-hulled patrol vessel, 1925–1943

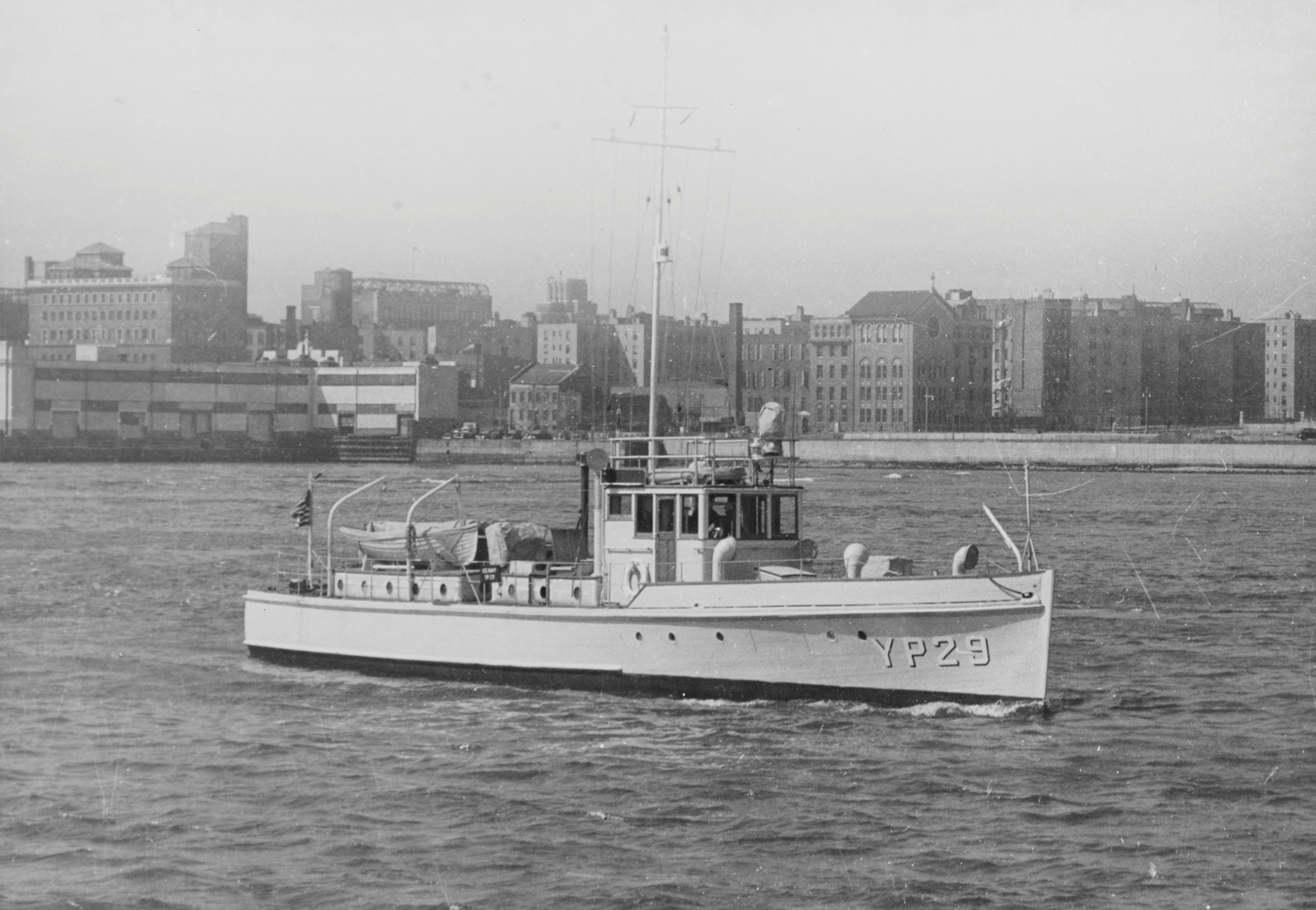
- Sister ship YP-29 (ex CG-116) in 1941

United States Coast Guard
- Name: CG-182
- Ordered: 1924
- Builder: Southern Shipyard Corporation, Newport News, Virginia
- Commissioned: 1925
- Fate: Transferred to United States Navy, 1934
- Notes: Call sign: NROQ

United States Navy
- Acquired: 1934
- Reclassified: YP-49
- Honours and awards: American Defense Service Medal; American Campaign Medal; World War II Victory Medal
- Fate: scrapped, December 1943

General characteristics
- Tonnage: 37.5 GRT
- Length: 74.9 ft (22.8 m) o/a
- Beam: 13.6 ft (4.1 m)
- Draught: 3.75 ft (1.14 m)
- Installed power: 500 SHP
- Propulsion: two Sterling 6-cylinder gasoline engines, two propellers
- Complement: 8
- Armament: 1 x 1-pounder gun forward

USS YP-49 was a wooden-hulled patrol vessel in commission in the fleet of the United States Coast Guard as CG-182 from 1925 to 1934, and in the fleet of the United States Navy as YP-49 from 1934 until 1943.

== History ==
She was laid down at the Newport News, Virginia shipyard of the Southern Shipyard Corporation, one of 203 "Six-Bitters" ordered by the United States Coast Guard. She was designed for long-range picket and patrol duty during Prohibition for postings 20 to 30 miles from shore. The date of her launching and completion is uncertain although the class design was finalized in April 1924 and all of the Six-Bitters were commissioned by 1925. She was commissioned in 1925 as CG-182. In 1934, she was transferred to the United States Navy and designated as a Yard Patrol Craft (YP). In December 1943, she was scrapped.
