= USCG CG-249 =

United States Coast Guard
- Name: CG-249
- Ordered: 1924
- Builder: Gibbs Gas Engine Company, Jacksonville, Florida
- Commissioned: 1924/1925
- Decommissioned: 1930/1931
- Stricken: 1930/1931
- Identification: code letters: NAMJ

General characteristics
- Tonnage: 37.5 GRT
- Length: 74.9 ft (22.8 m) o/a
- Beam: 13.6 ft (4.1 m)
- Draught: 3.75 ft (1.14 m)
- Installed power: 500 SHP
- Propulsion: two Sterling 6-cylinder gasoline engines, two propellers
- Complement: 8
- Armament: 1 x 1-pounder gun forward

CG-249 was a wooden-hulled patrol vessel in commission in the fleet of the United States Coast Guard.

== History ==
She was laid down at the Jacksonville, Florida shipyard of Gibbs Gas Engine Company, one of 203 "Six-Bitters" ordered by the United States Coast Guard. She was designed for long-range picket and patrol duty during Prohibition for postings 20 to 30 miles from shore. The date of her launching and completion is uncertain although the class design was finalized in April 1924 and all of the Six-Bitters were commissioned by 1925. She was commissioned in 1924/1925 as CG-249. On 7 August 1927, her crew boarded a ship suspected of transporting alcohol off the coast of Florida. A member of the boarded ship, Horace Alderman, murdered two Coast Guardsmen including her commanding officer, Boatswain Sidney C. Sanderlin, and a Secret Service agent before being subdued by the remainder of the crew. Alderman was tried, convicted, and sentenced to death; he was hanged at the Coast Guard station at Bahia Mar, Florida on 17 August 1929. She was struck from the register in 1930/1931.
