= United States lightship Overfalls (LV-118) =

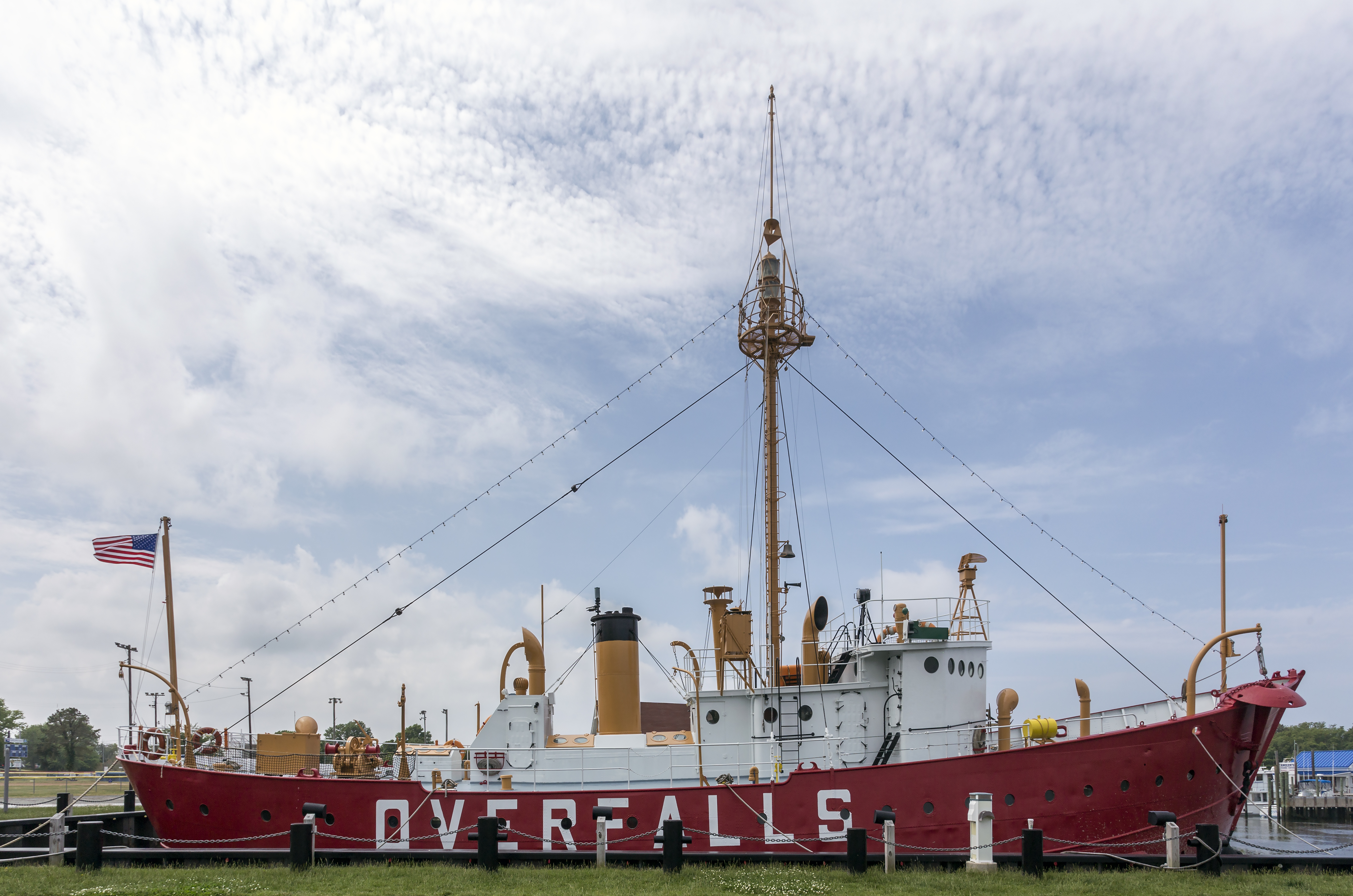
- WAL 539 painted for "OVERFALLS" station, docked in Lewes, Delaware in 2015

History

United States
- Name: LV 118
- Operator: United States Lighthouse Service/United States Coast Guard
- Builder: Rice Brothers Corporation, East Boothbay, Maine
- Cost: $223,900
- Launched: 4 June 1938
- Commissioned: 11 September 1938
- Decommissioned: 7 November 1972
- Renamed: WAL 539 (1939/1947–1965); WLV-539 (1965-1973)
- Status: Museum Ship in Lewes, Delaware

General characteristics
- Type: Lightvessel
- Displacement: 412 short tons (374 t)
- Length: 114 ft 9 in (34.98 m)
- Beam: 26 ft (7.9 m)
- Draft: 13 ft 4 in (4.06 m)
- Installed power: Cooper-Bessemer 8 cylinder air-start Diesel engine, 400 bhp (300 kW)
- Propulsion: Single shaft, reduction gear, 7 ft 2 in (2.18 m) propeller
- Speed: 9 knots (17 km/h; 10 mph)
- Crew: 14
- Lightship WAL-539
- U.S. National Register of Historic Places
- U.S. National Historic Landmark
- Location within Delaware
- Location: Lewes, Delaware
- Coordinates: 38°46′40.5″N 75°8′28″W
- Built: 1938
- Architect: Rice Brothers
- NRHP reference No.: 89000006

Significant dates
- Added to NRHP: 16 February 1989
- Designated NHL: 14 June 2011

Lightship Overfalls (LV-118) (later renumbered WAL-539) was the last lightvessel constructed for the United States Lighthouse Service before the Service became part of the United States Coast Guard. She is currently preserved in Lewes, Delaware as a museum ship.

== History ==
This ship was built to replace LV-44, badly damaged in the New England Hurricane of 1938, for the Cornfield Point station. Patterned after the LV-112, she has a hull unlike that of any of her sisters; in effect, a single-ship class. She is the last riveted-hull lightship built for the United States Lighthouse Service, all subsequent ships having welded hulls. Propulsion was diesel, with a set of diesel generators and compressors providing power for the beacon and auxiliaries. The light was a duplex 375 mm (14.8 in) lantern on a single mast, at 57 ft (17 m) above the water line. Dual diaphones were provided for a fog signal, as well as a bell and radiobeacon. A radar unit was installed in 1943. The crew complement was fourteen, to serve on a two weeks on/one week off basis. When the lighthouse service was merged into the coast guard in 1939, she was renumbered WAL 539.

LV 118 / WAL 539 served at these stations:

1938-1957: Cornfield Point, Connecticut
1958-1962: Cross Rip, Massachusetts
1962-1972: Boston, Massachusetts

Unlike most US lightships WAL 539 remained on station during World War II. A severe storm in December 1970 damaged the ship, leading to her decommissioning on November 7, 1972. Upon retirement WAL 539 was donated to the Lewes Historical Society and placed on display in Lewes, Delaware, painted for the "OVERFALLS" station, though she never served there. The Lightship that actually served on the Overfalls station is on display in Portsmouth, Virginia. The ship's condition deteriorated and a failed attempt in 1999 to sell her led to the formation of a separate group, the Overfalls Maritime Museum Foundation, to take over the maintenance and restore the vessel. She remains in Lewes and is available for tours.

The lightship was placed on the National Register of Historic Places in 1989, and in 2011 was further designated a National Historic Landmark.

== See also ==
- List of National Historic Landmarks in Delaware
- National Register of Historic Places listings in Sussex County, Delaware
- List of maritime museums in the United States
