= 36-foot picket boat (USCG) =

American Coast Guard patrol craft

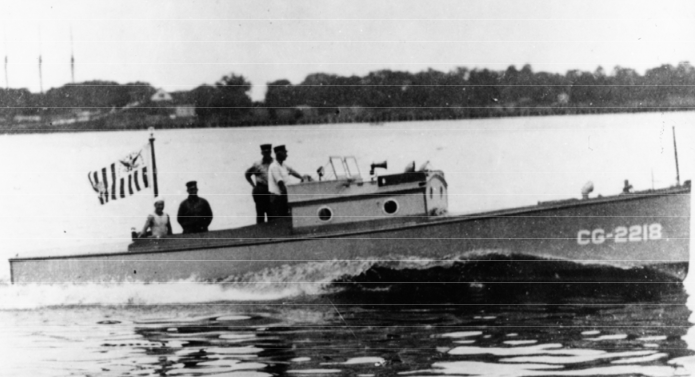
- Single cabin 36-foot picket boat CG-2218

Class overview
- Name: CG-2200-class picket boat
- Operators: United States Coast Guard
- Succeeded by: 38-foot picket boat
- In service: 1925
- Completed: 103

General characteristics
- Class & type: 36-foot picket boat
- Length: 36 ft 0 in (10.97 m); 35 ft 8 in (10.87 m) (single cabin)
- Beam: 8 ft 6 in (2.59 m)
- Draught: 2 ft 6 in (0.76 m)
- Propulsion: 180 HP Consolidated Speedway MR-6 six cylinder gasoline engine
- Speed: 23 knots (25 knots single cabin)
- Complement: 3
- Armament: various other small arms.

The United States Coast Guard wooden-hulled 36-foot picket boats were built during Prohibition to help interdict alcohol smugglers ("rum runners").

== Design and construction ==
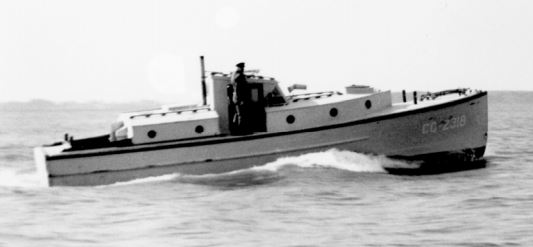
Double-cabin 36-foot picket boat CG-2318

After the end of World War I, the U.S. Coast Guard reverted to the control of the Department of the Treasury and soon found itself in the midst of a new task with the National Prohibition Act which took effect on 17 January 1920. The Coast Guard response was to develop a two-tiered plan. Larger cutters were to be stationed offshore to find "mother ships" and interdict them if they strayed inside U.S. territorial waters (mother ships were in almost all cases of foreign registry and could not be boarded while in international waters). Smaller, faster patrol boats were used as picket boats to intercept high speed boats or "rum-runners" that made the transfer of contraband to the shore. The Coast Guard developed the 75-foot patrol boat to serve the offshore role and the 36-foot patrol boat to serve the inshore role. The Coast Guard contracted with seven different yards to produce the single-cabin model and six yards for the double-cabin model. 103 picket boats were produced: 30 were single-cabin, open cockpit models of 35’8" overall length (numbered CG-2200 through CG-2229); and seventy-three were double-cabin, open cockpit models of 36’ numbered CG-2300 through CG-2372. They were powered with a single, 180 HP Consolidated Speedway MR-6 six cylinder gasoline engine. The cost per boat was $8,800. All ships were in service by 1925. In 1931 and 1932, 21 38-foot picket boats were built to augment the 36-footers.
