= USS Milan =

Patrol vessel of the United States Navy

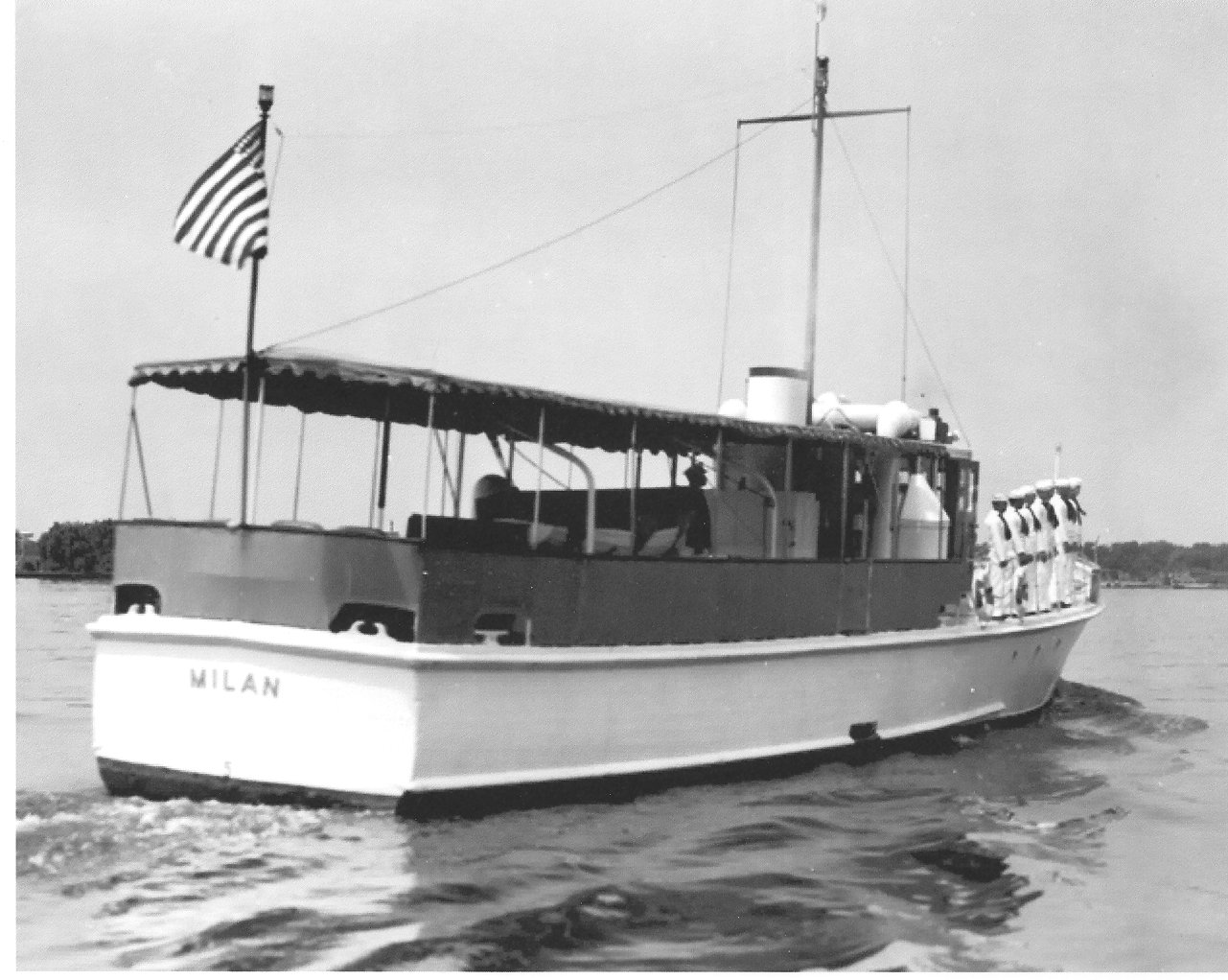

History

United States
- Name: USCGC Onondago (WCG-209)
- Builder: Kingston Drydock and Construction Co., Kingston, New York
- Launched: 1925
- Identification: Code letters: NATR (pre-war)
- Fate: Transferred to the United States Navy, 11 December 1933

United States
- Name: USS Onandago
- Commissioned: 11 December 1933
- Decommissioned: 5 April 1946
- Renamed: USS Skaneateles, 1 June 1934; USS Milan, 20 October 1937
- Stricken: 7 July 1946
- Fate: Turned over to the WSA for disposal, 7 July 1946; Sold, 27 July 1946

General characteristics
- Type: Patrol vessel
- Displacement: 37.5 long tons (38 t)
- Length: 74 ft 11 in (22.83 m)
- Beam: 13 ft 8 in (4.17 m)
- Draft: 3 ft 9 in (1.14 m)
- Propulsion: 2 × 6-cylinder 400 hp (298 kW) gasoline engines, two screws
- Speed: 14 knots (26 km/h; 16 mph)
- Complement: 8
- Armament: unknown

USS Milan (YP‑6) was a 75-foot patrol boat which served in the United States Coast Guard as Onondago (WCG-209) until transferred to the United States Navy. The ship was built in 1925 by Kingston Drydock and Construction Company of Kingston, New York.

== Service history ==
Placed in Navy service on 11 December 1933, she was renamed USS Skaneateles on 1 June 1934 before being renamed USS Milan on 20 October 1937. The Milan was rechristened by Mrs. Charles Edison, wife of the Assistant Secretary of the Navy and daughter-in-law of Thomas Edison. The name is in reference the village in Ohio, Edison's birthplace.

After her rechristening as USS Milan, (YP-6), a former district patrol vessel, was tied up at the Washington Navy Yard for the use of the Assistant Secretary of the Navy. With the outbreak of World War II, she was returned to patrol duties. In the middle of the war she was loaned, for a brief period, to the dock department, City of New York, after which she returned to the Washington, D.C., area, stationed at Dahlgren, Virginia. Declared to be excess to the needs of the Navy on 5 April 1946, Milan was turned over to War Shipping Administration for disposal on 7 July 1946 and sold on 27 July 1946.
