= USS Bunting (AMS-3) =

Minesweeper of the United States Navy

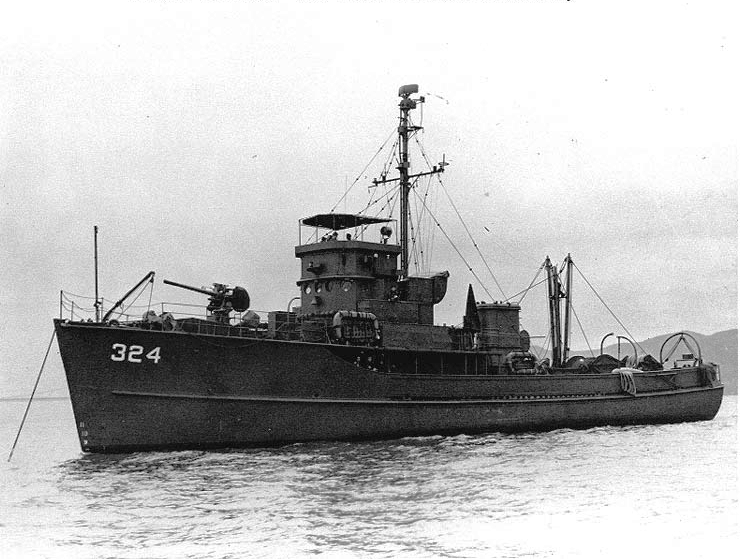
- A YMS-1-class minesweeper

History

United States
- Name: USS YMS-170
- Builder: Dachel-Carter Shipbuilding Corporation; Benton Harbor, Michigan
- Laid down: 1 October 1942
- Launched: 29 May 1943
- Sponsored by: Miss Lydia Martin
- Christened: 29 May 1943
- Commissioned: 23 July 1943 at Algiers, Louisiana
- Decommissioned: 30 July 1946
- Renamed: USS Bunting (AMS-3), 18 February 1947
- Namesake: bunting
- Recommissioned: 18 July 1950
- Reclassified: MHC-45, 7 February 1955
- Decommissioned: 6 May 1960
- Stricken: 1 June 1960
- Fate: Sunk as a target, between July and September 1962

General characteristics
- Class & type: YMS-135 subclass of YMS-1-class minesweepers
- Displacement: 320 (f.) tons
- Length: 136 ft 0 in (41.45 m)
- Beam: 24 ft 6 in (7.47 m)
- Draft: 6 ft 1 in (1.85 m)
- Propulsion: 2 × 880 bhp General Motors 8-268A diesel engines; 2 shafts
- Speed: 12 knots (22 km/h)
- Complement: 33
- Armament: 1 × 3"/50 caliber gun mount; 2 × 20 mm guns; 2 × depth charge projectors

USS Bunting (YMS-170/AMS-3/MHC-45) was a YMS-1-class minesweeper of the YMS-135 subclass in the United States Navy during World War II.

== History ==
Bunting was laid down on 1 October 1942 at Benton Harbor, Michigan, by the Dachel-Carter Shipbuilding Corporation; launched on 29 May 1943; and commissioned on 23 July 1943 at Algiers, Louisiana.

The motor minesweeper completed fitting out and trials in the 8th Naval District and then got underway for the Norfolk, Virginia. area at the beginning of August. On 11 August, she arrived at Little Creek, Virginia, whence she conducted shakedown and minesweeping training in Chesapeake Bay. Early in September, YMS-170 stood down the east coast to Key West, Florida, where she arrived on 12 September. After a brief period in drydock for repairs at Key West, she put to sea at the end of the month for Puerto Rico. The motor minesweeper arrived in San Juan on 4 October. For the next 22 months, YMS-170 operated among the islands of the southeastern Caribbean performing minesweeping operations, escorting warships and merchantmen, conducting antisubmarine patrols and miscellaneous other minor duties.

On 20 August 1945, the warship left the Caribbean on her way to duty on the Pacific coast. She arrived at San Pedro, California, on 7 September and began service with the 11th Naval District. That assignment, however, proved brief. On 22 October, YMS-170 stood out of San Pedro on her way to the western Pacific. After stops at Pearl Harbor, Eniwetok, and Saipan, the motor minesweeper arrived in the Philippines at Samar on Leyte Island on 17 January 1946. In February and March, the warship swept mines in Lamon Bay off the southeastern coast of Luzon. In May, YMS-170 headed back to the United States. She reached San Diego on 17 June and, in July, moved to San Pedro under tow.

On 30 July 1946, YMS-170 was placed out of commission at San Pedro. On 18 February 1947 while still in the reserve fleet, YMS-170 was named Bunting and was redesignated AMS-3. A little more than three years later on 18 July 1950, the warship was placed in commission, in reserve, and assigned to the 11th Naval District. Bunting conducted minesweeping exercises out of San Diego until 18 November at which time she put to sea from San Diego on her way to Hawaii. She spent almost three years operating in the islands with Mine Divisions (MinDiv) 51 and 71. Bunting returned to the west coast at Long Beach, California, on 12 September 1953 and spent the rest of the year engaged in exercises, type training, and other drills.

On 15 January 1954, the minesweeper departed Long Beach on her way back to the east coast. After transiting the Panama Canal, she entered port at Charleston, South Carolina, on 15 February. Bunting spent the remainder of her active career assigned to the 6th Naval District – based, however, at Key West rather than at Charleston. During that time, she conducted the usual multi- and single-ship mine hunting exercises and drills. In addition, the warship served periodically as a training platform for students at the Fleet Sonar School. Also during that time, she changed designations to MHC-45 on 7 February 1955.

On 6 May 1960, Bunting was decommissioned at Key West. Her name was struck from the Naval Vessel Register on 1 June 1960. The minehunter remained inactive at Key West for a little more than two years. Sometime between July and September 1962, she was sunk as a target.

== See also ==
- Other Ships built by Dachel-Carter Shipbuilding Corporation:

- USS Bobolink (AMS-2)
- USS Miss Toledo (SP-1711)
