= USS Miss Toledo =

Patrol vessel of the United States Navy

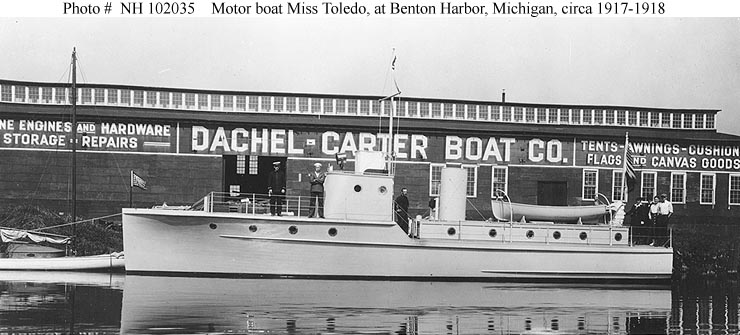
- Miss Toledo as a private motorboat at the shipyard of her builder, the Dachel-Carter Boat Company in Benton Harbor, Michigan, prior to her acquisition by the United States Navy. A U.S. Navy officer and at least one sailor are among the people standing on her deck.

History

United States
- Name: USS Miss Toledo
- Namesake: Previous name retained
- Builder: Dachel-Carter Shipbuilding Corporation in Benton Harbor, Michigan
- Completed: 1917
- Acquired: 30 April 1918
- Fate: Returned to owner 14 December 1918

General characteristics
- Type: Patrol vessel
- Tonnage: 19 Gross register tons
- Length: 60 ft (18 m)
- Beam: 11 ft (3.4 m)
- Draft: 4 ft (1.2 m)
- Propulsion: Gasoline engine
- Speed: 25 miles per hour

USS Miss Toledo (SP-1711) was a United States Navy patrol vessel acquired for a few months in 1918.

Miss Toledo was built in 1917 by the Dachel-Carter Shipbuilding Corporation at Benton Harbor, Michigan. On 30 April 1918, the U.S. Navy acquired her under a free lease from her owner, R. M. Ellery of Toledo, Ohio, for use as a section patrol boat during World War I. She was assigned the section patrol number SP-1711.

Although presumably acquired for patrol work on the Great Lakes, Miss Toledo apparently saw no active naval service. The Navy returned her to Ellery on 14 December 1918.

== See also ==
- Other Ships built by Dachel-Carter Shipbuilding Corporation:

- USS Bobolink (AMS-2)
- USS Bunting (AMS-3)
