= United States lightship Relief (WLV-605) =

Relief (WAL-605)
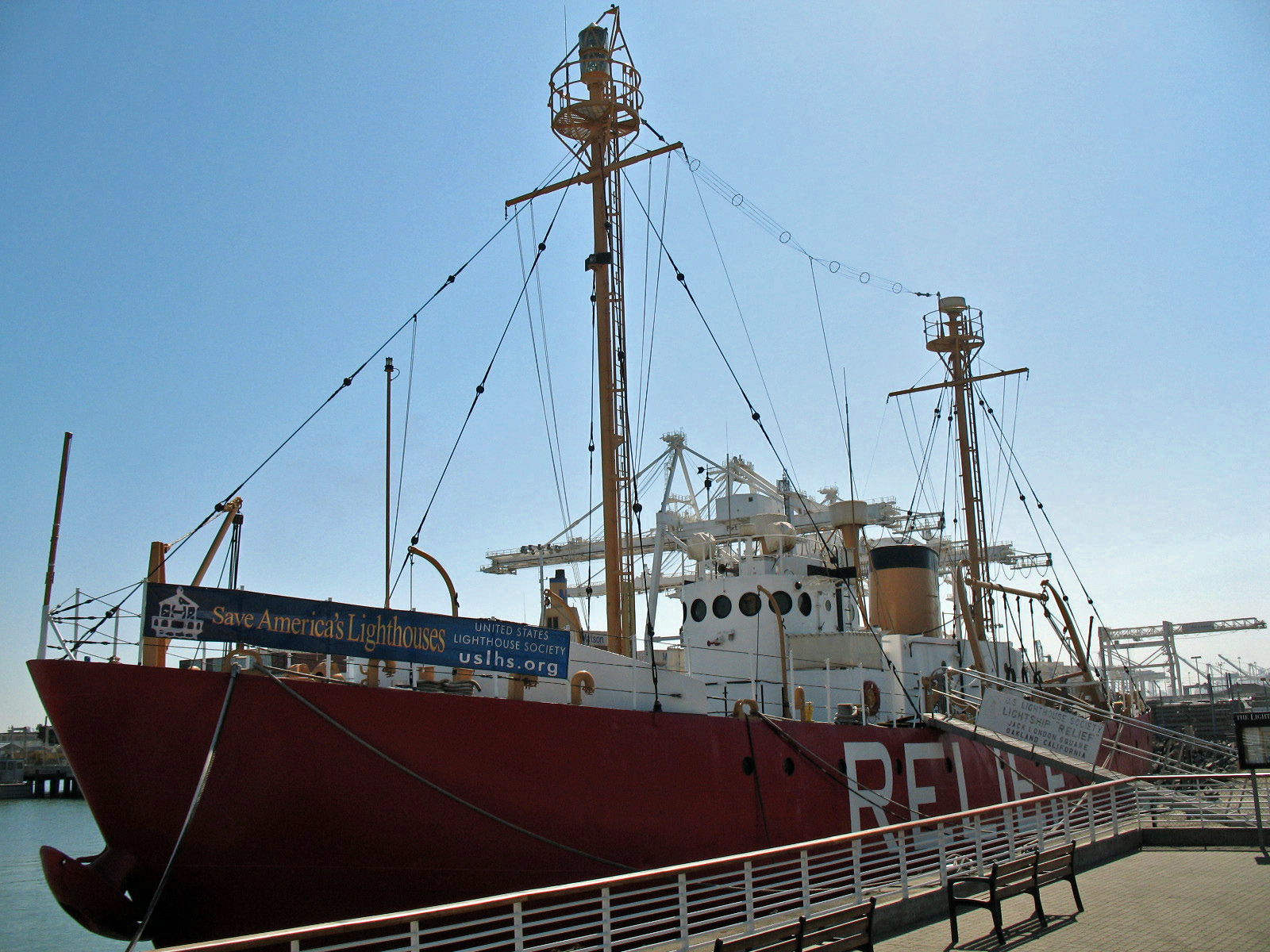
- Photo of the vessel taken from a walkway northeast of it.

History

United States
- Builder: Rice Brothers Corporation
- Laid down: 1 March 1949
- Launched: 4 May 1950
- Sponsored by: Miss Elizabeth F Loughlin
- Commissioned: 15 February 1951
- Decommissioned: 1 January 1976
- Out of service: 1975
- Identification: WAL-605 (1950–1965); WLV-605 (1965–)
- Status: Museum ship

General characteristics
- Tonnage: 400 gross register tons (GRT)
- Displacement: 546 Loaded Tons
- Length: 128 ft (39 m) LOA; 112 ft (34 m) LWL
- Beam: 30 ft (9.1 m)
- Draft: 11 ft (3.4 m)
- Depth: 21.4 ft (6.5 m)
- Lightship WAL-605, RELIEF
- U.S. National Register of Historic Places
- U.S. National Historic Landmark
- California Historical Landmark
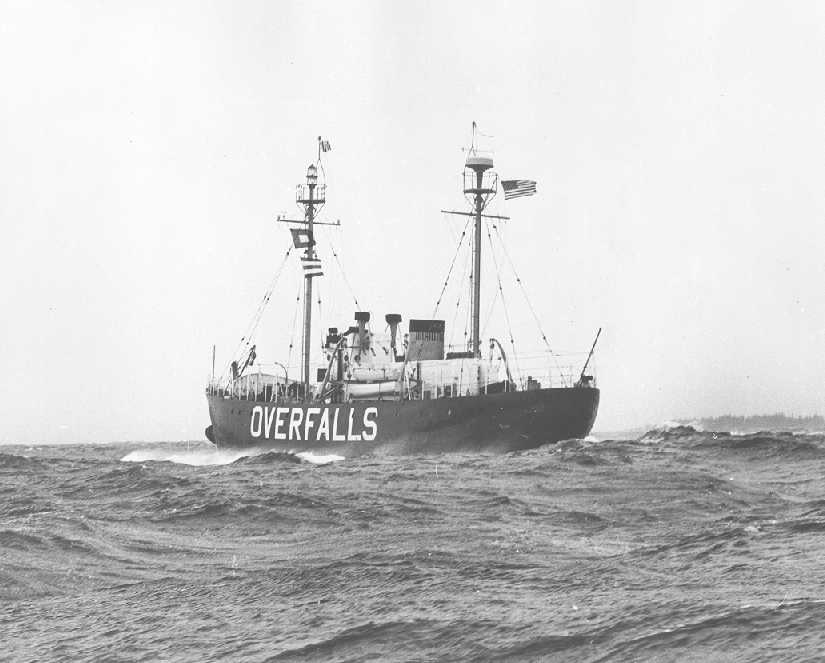
- Serving as WLV-605 at Overfalls

- Location within California
- Location: Oakland, California
- Coordinates: 37°47′44.48″N 122°16′50.13″W
- Built: 1950
- Architect: Rice Brothers
- NRHP reference No.: 89002462
- CHISL No.: 1036

Significant dates
- Added to NRHP: 20 December 1989
- Designated NHL: 20 December 1989

United States lightship Relief (WLV-605) is a lightvessel now serving as a museum ship in Oakland, California. Built in 1950, she is one of a small number of surviving lightships, and one of an even smaller number built specifically for the United States Coast Guard. Along with her sister ship, the WLV-604 Columbia, she is a good example of the last generation of lightships built. She was declared a National Historic Landmark in 1989.

== Description and history ==
WLV-605 is located on the Oakland waterfront, at the far eastern end of the Port of Oakland just west of the Oakland Ferry Terminal. The ship has a welded steel hull 128 feet (39 m) long, with a beam of 30 feet (9.1 m) and a hold depth of 21.4 feet (6.5 m). She is register at 400 gross tons. Above-deck features include a steel deckhouse, a breakwater fore, and two steel masts on which its lights are mounted. She also historically carried a fog signal and bell, both operated by hand.

WLV-605 was laid down as WAL-605 in 1949 at the Rice Brothers shipyard in East Boothbay Harbor, Maine. She was launched on March 4, 1950, just sixteen days after Columbia, and was delivered, fully fitted, to the Coast Guard on February 11, 1951. She began service at the lightstation "Overfalls" at the entrance to Delaware Bay, serving until 1960, when the station was discontinued. She then sailed to the west coast, where she served at Blunts Reef off Cape Mendocino until 1969. During this time, Coast Guard lightvessels were redesignated, and she was redesignated WLV-605. She was then given the name "Relief", assigned duty to relieve other lightships on the Pacific coast. She was retired from service in 1975 and decommissioned the following year.

After several unsuccessful attempts to convert her to a museum ship, she was acquired in 1986 by the United States Lighthouse Society, which now maintains the vessel in Oakland.

== See also ==
- List of National Historic Landmarks in California
- National Register of Historic Places listings in Alameda County, California
