= United States lightship Columbia =

Lightship formerly moored at the mouth of the Columbia River

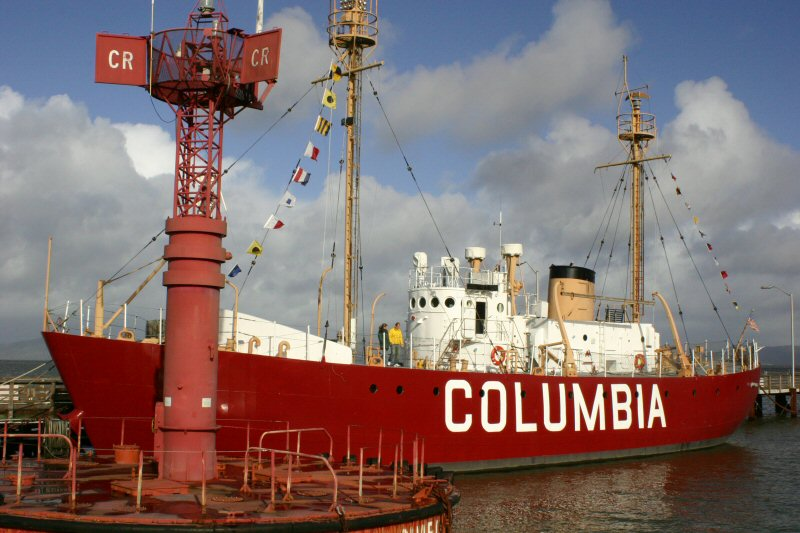
- Lightship Columbia

History

United States
- Name: USCGC Columbia (WLV-604)
- Namesake: Columbia River
- Builder: Rice Brothers Corporation, Boothbay, Maine
- Launched: 1950
- Commissioned: 1951
- Decommissioned: 1979
- Home port: Astoria, Oregon
- Status: Museum ship

General characteristics
- Displacement: 617 long tons (627 t)
- Length: 128 ft (39 m)
- Beam: 30 ft (9.1 m)
- Draft: 11 ft (3.4 m)
- Propulsion: 1 × 550 hp (410 kW) Atlas-Imperial direct reversing 8-cylinder diesel engine
- Speed: 10.7 knots (19.8 km/h; 12.3 mph)
- Complement: 17 enlisted, 1 warrant officer
- Anchor: 7,000 lb (3,200 kg) mushroom anchor
- Light: 600 kilocandela lens, 1,200 watt light (13 nmi (24 km; 15 mi) range)
- Foghorn: Diaphone foghorn (5 mi (8.0 km) range)
- Lightship WAL-604, "Columbia"
- U.S. National Register of Historic Places
- U.S. National Historic Landmark
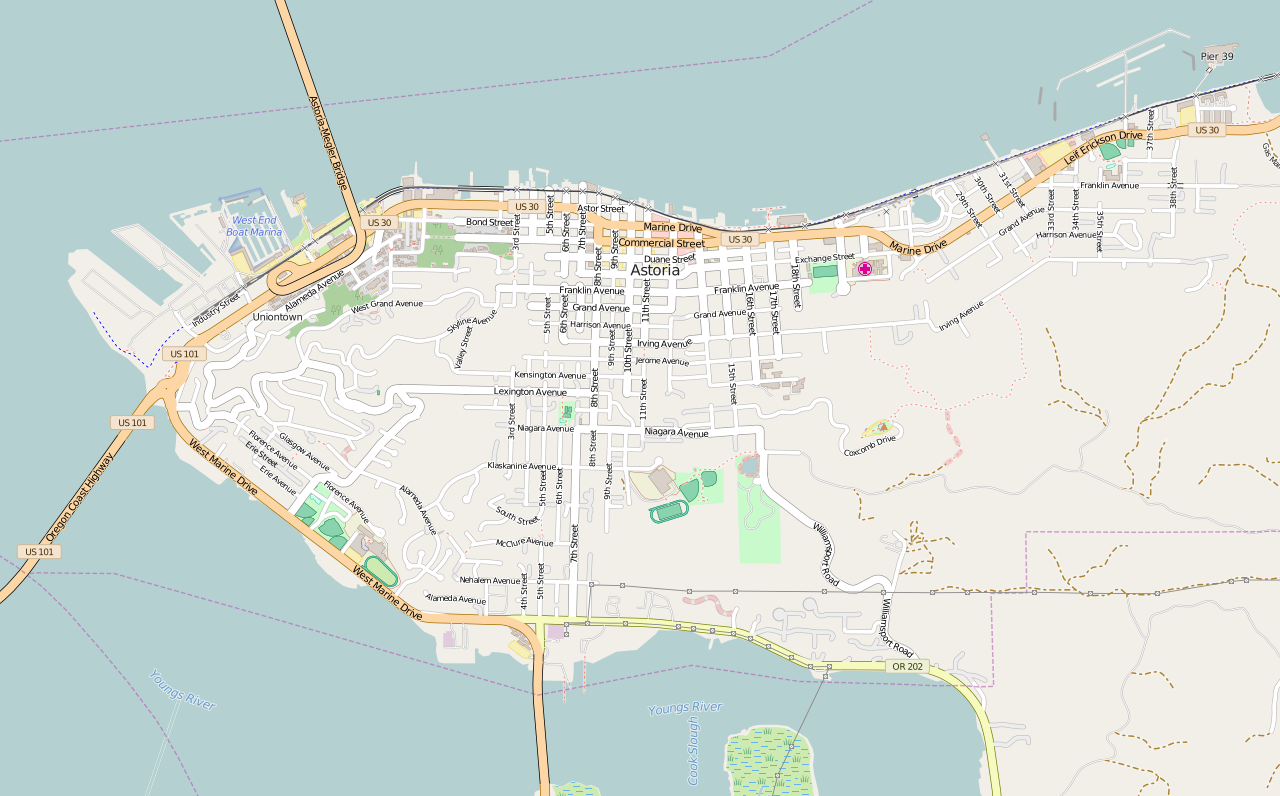
- Location within Astoria OR
- Location: 1792 Marine Drive, Astoria, Oregon
- Coordinates: 46°11′25″N 123°49′26″W
- Built: 1950
- Architect: Rice Brothers
- NRHP reference No.: 89002463

Significant dates
- Added to NRHP: February 17, 1978
- Designated NHL: December 20, 1989

United States lightship Columbia (WLV-604) is a lightship located in Astoria, Oregon, United States of America. Columbia was formerly moored near the mouth of the Columbia River.

== History ==
Commissioned in 1951, Columbia was the fourth and final lightship stationed at the mouth of the Columbia River. Built by Rice Brothers Shipyard in Boothbay, Maine, Columbia was launched with her sister-ship, Relief (WLV-605). The new WLV-604 replaced the aging vessel LV-93, which had been in service on the Columbia River since 1939. From 1892 until 1979, the Columbia River lightships guided vessels across the Columbia River Bar and an area known as the Graveyard of the Pacific. Columbia was the final lightship to be decommissioned on the U.S. West coast. She was replaced by an automated navigational buoy soon after. The buoy has since been retired.

Because of its importance, the Coast Guard had a permanent 18 man crew stationed on board, consisting of 17 enlisted men and one warrant officer who served as ship's captain. Everything the crew needed had to be on board. In the winter, weeks of rough weather prevented any supplies from being delivered. Life on board the lightship was marked by long stretches of monotony and boredom intermixed with riding gale-force storms. The crew worked two to four week rotations, with ten men on duty at all times.

In 1978, Columbia was added to the National Register of Historic Places. It was removed from the Register in 1983 due to relocation from its historic location. She was returned to the Register in 1989 when she was declared a National Historic Landmark, listed under the name Lightship WAL-604, "Columbia". WLV-604 is now located at the Columbia River Maritime Museum, alongside the navigational buoy that replaced her in 1979.

== See also ==
- List of lighthouses on the Oregon Coast
- Columbia Bar
