= USS Bobolink (AMS-2) =

Minesweeper of the United States Navy

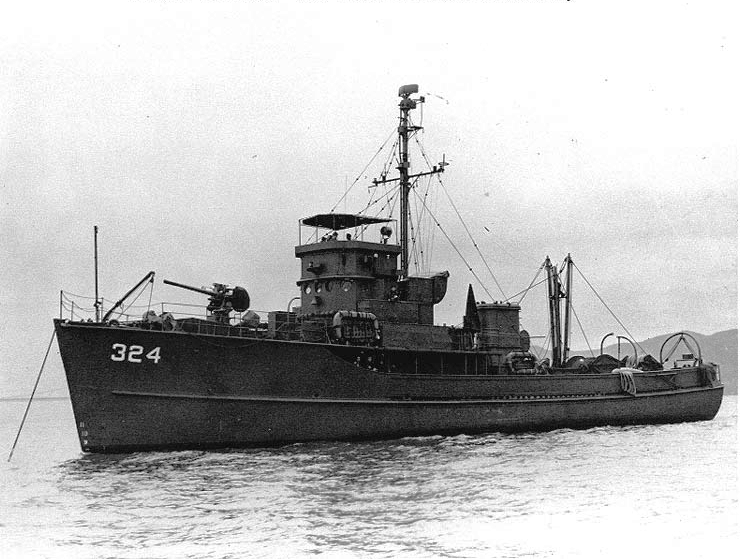
- A YMS-1-class minesweeper

History

United States
- Ordered: as YMS 164
- Builder: Dachel-Carter Shipbuilding Corporation, Benton Harbor, Michigan
- Laid down: 24 April 1942
- Launched: 28 November 1942
- Commissioned: 14 April 1943
- Decommissioned: 7 June 1946
- In service: 9 May 1950
- Out of service: 2 December 1957
- Stricken: 1 January 1960
- Fate: fate unknown

General characteristics
- Displacement: 320 tons
- Length: 136 ft (41 m)
- Beam: 24 ft 6 in (7.47 m)
- Draught: 6 ft 1 in (1.85 m)
- Speed: 13 knots
- Complement: 33
- Armament: one 3 in (76 mm) gun mount, 2 x 20 mm machine guns (2x1)

USS Bobolink (AMS-2/YMS-164) was a YMS-1-class minesweeper of the YMS-135 subclass acquired by the U.S. Navy for the task of removing mines that had been placed in the water to prevent ships from passing.

YMS-164 was laid down on 24 April 1942 at Benton Harbor, Michigan, by the Dachel-Carter Shipbuilding Corporation; launched on 28 November 1942, sponsored by Mrs. Anna Arny; and commissioned on 14 April 1943.

== Operational history ==
During the first 15 months of her active service, the motor minesweeper operated along the east coast of the United States. In July 1944, she voyaged across the Atlantic Ocean to participate in the invasion of southern France and, but for refueling and replenishment breaks at Corsica, remained off that coast sweeping mines from the first assaults on the morning of 15 August until 21 September. At that time, she moved to Palermo, Sicily, where she performed additional minesweeping duties. YMS-164 continued to serve at various locations in the Mediterranean through the end of hostilities in Europe.

The minesweeper headed back to the United States late in June 1945 and arrived in New York on Independence Day of that year. Not long thereafter, YMS-164 moved to the U.S. West Coast and ultimately to duty at Pearl Harbor, Hawaii, where she was serving at the end of World War II. Back on the west coast by the late spring of 1946, she was decommissioned at San Diego, California, on 7 June 1946.

While in reserve at San Diego, the minesweeper was named Bobolink and redesignated AMS-2 on 17 February 1947. Though still out of commission, she served as a training ship for naval reservists in the 12th Naval District from November 1948 to May 1950.

Bobolink was recommissioned at San Diego on 9 May 1950, and soon returned to active operations out of Pearl Harbor as a unit of the Pacific Fleet Mine Force. That assignment lasted until July 1953 when she returned to duty at San Diego for five months of operations from that port.

In January 1954, she steamed via the Panama Canal to Charleston, South Carolina, where she became a unit of Mine Division (MinDiv) 43. Charleston served as her base of operations until March 1954 when she moved to the Mine Countermeasures Station at Panama City, Florida, located on the Gulf Coast of western Florida. That occupation prevailed for a year. In February 1955, Bobolink returned to Charleston to begin conversion to a coastal mine hunter. On 7 February 1955, she was redesignated MHC 44.

The modifications took about seven months. She then conducted refresher training out of Norfolk, Virginia, from October to December before reporting for duty to the Commandant, 1st Naval District. Operations out of Boston, Massachusetts, and along the Atlantic coast occupied her for the next two years.

On 2 December 1957, Bobolink was decommissioned at Green Cove Springs, Florida, and was berthed with the Atlantic Reserve Fleet group there. She remained in reserve until her name was struck from the Navy list on 1 January 1960.

Bobolink earned one battle star for service in World War II as YMS 164.

== See also ==
- Other ships built by the Dachel-Carter Shipbuilding Corporation:

- USS Bunting (AMS-3)
- USS Miss Toledo (SP-1711)
- USS YP-15
