= Rice Brothers Corporation =

Historic US shipyard

Rice Brothers Corporation was a shipyard located in East Boothbay, Maine that operated from 1892 until 1956.

== History ==
The Rice Brothers Company was founded in 1892 by brothers Frank, William, and Henry Rice. In 1921, it organized as Rice Brothers Corporation. They built numerous types of small ships (schooners, catboats, yachts, yawls, sloops, ketches, fishing trawlers, motorboats) for private owners as well as ships for the U.S. Coast Guard and the U.S. Navy. In 1924 and 1925, they built ten 75-foot patrol boats for the U.S. Coast Guard (numbered CG-170 through CG-179) which were used during Prohibition to intercept rumrunners. In 1942, they built 2 SC-497-class submarine chasers (SC-503 and SC-504). In 1943, they built 11 YMS-1-class minesweepers (numbered YMS-12 through YMS-17 and YMS-303 through YMS-307). Between 1921 and 1950, they built four lightships: Poe (LV-99) in 1921; Cornfield (LV-118) in 1938; and Columbia (WAL-604) and Overfalls (WAL-605) in 1950. The shipyard closed in 1956. The site is now part of the Washburn & Doughty shipyard.
