= A. W. de Young Boat & Shipbuilding Company =

Shipbuilder in Alameda, California, US

A. W. de Young Boat & Shipbuilding Company was a shipbuilder located in Alameda, California, active in the 1920s. She was incorporated in 1924 with $150,000 in share capital by ship designer and builder A. W. de Young in partnership with R.J. Connor. De Young had previously operated a ship repair facility on the Oakland side of the estuary but due to high business demand needed to acquire more space. The yard was located at the foot of Chestnut Street. The firm immediately secured contracts to build ten 75-foot patrol boats for the United States Coast Guard (CG-253 through CG-262) at $21,637 apiece which were all completed and in commission by 1925; a pile driver for the San Francisco Harbor Board; a snagboat (Yuba) for the U.S. Engineers Department of the Army for use on the Sacramento River completed in 1924; as well as improvements to the Dollar Steamship Company's dock facilities. She went on to build a variety of ships thereafter mostly focusing on barges, dredges, and freighters for local use including a twin-screw, shallow-draft, bay freighter (South Shore II) for the South Shore Port Company.
