= John H. Mathis & Company =

American shipbuilding company, c. 1900–1961

Coordinates: 39.957°N 75.128°W

John H. Mathis & Company was a shipbuilding company founded around 1900, based at Cooper Point in Camden, New Jersey, U.S., on the Delaware River. At their shipyard at Point and Erie Streets, the company built luxury yachts and also commercial ships. During World War II a variety of Naval vessels were built. The Mathis shipyard closed in 1961.

== John H. Mathis & Company ==
The John H. Mathis Company built a variety of commercial and naval vessels, including freighters, ferries, and fishing boats, FS ("Freight and Supply") ships for the Army, minesweepers, net tenders, patrol boats, lighthouse tenders, tugs, and barges.

- 4 of 32 Aloe-class net laying ships
  - Teaberry (AN-34) ... Yew (AN-37)
- 3 of 95 Auk-class minesweepers
  - Sway (AM-120) ... Swift (AM-122)
- 5 gasoline barges, 2 water barges

== Mathis Yacht Building Company ==
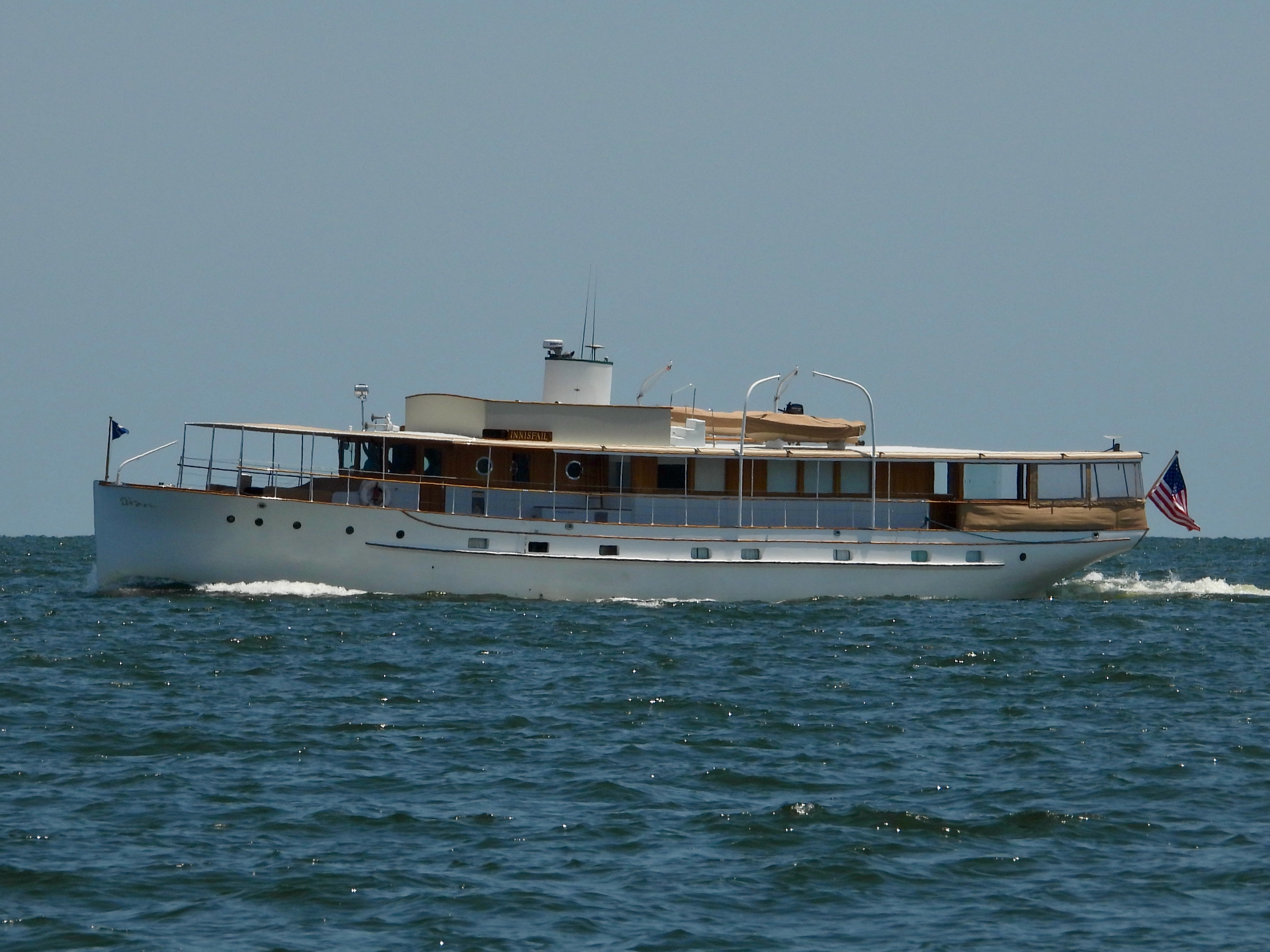
MV Innisfail, launched in 1939, sailing through Pamlico Sound in 2025

In 1910, Norwegian-born naval architect John Trumpy joined the company in partnership with John H. Mathis to design and build private yachts. The two companies, the John H. Mathis Company, and the Mathis Yacht Building Company, operated side by side at the Camden yard.

The Mathis Yacht Building Company built houseboats, tenders, and yachts for some of the wealthiest American families, including the Sequoia in 1925, which would later serve as the Presidential yacht between 1933 and 1977. After the death of John H. Mathis in 1939, John Trumpy became the sole owner of the Mathis Yacht Building Company. In 1924/1925, Mathis built 30 75-foot patrol boats (known as Six-Bitters) ordered by the United States Coast Guard at its Camden shipyard (CG-100 through CG-114 and CG-278 through CG-292).

== John Trumpy & Sons ==
By mid-1942 increased demand meant that the Camden yard capacity was needed for government contracts, so the Mathis Yacht Building Co. relocated to Gloucester City, New Jersey, just downriver of Camden, and was renamed John Trumpy & Sons in 1943. The USS Maquinna (YTB-225) was built there in 1944. In 1947, the Trumpy company relocated again to Annapolis, Maryland, after acquiring the Annapolis Yacht Yard.

In 1962, the Annapolis yard was destroyed in a fire and a year later, at the age of 84, John Trumpy died. The company continued under the control of his son John Trumpy Jr., but rising costs, a labor strike, and the advent of cheaper fiberglass hulls meant that in 1974 the company was wound up.
