= Yard patrol boat =

Type of training craft, by US Navy hull classification symbol

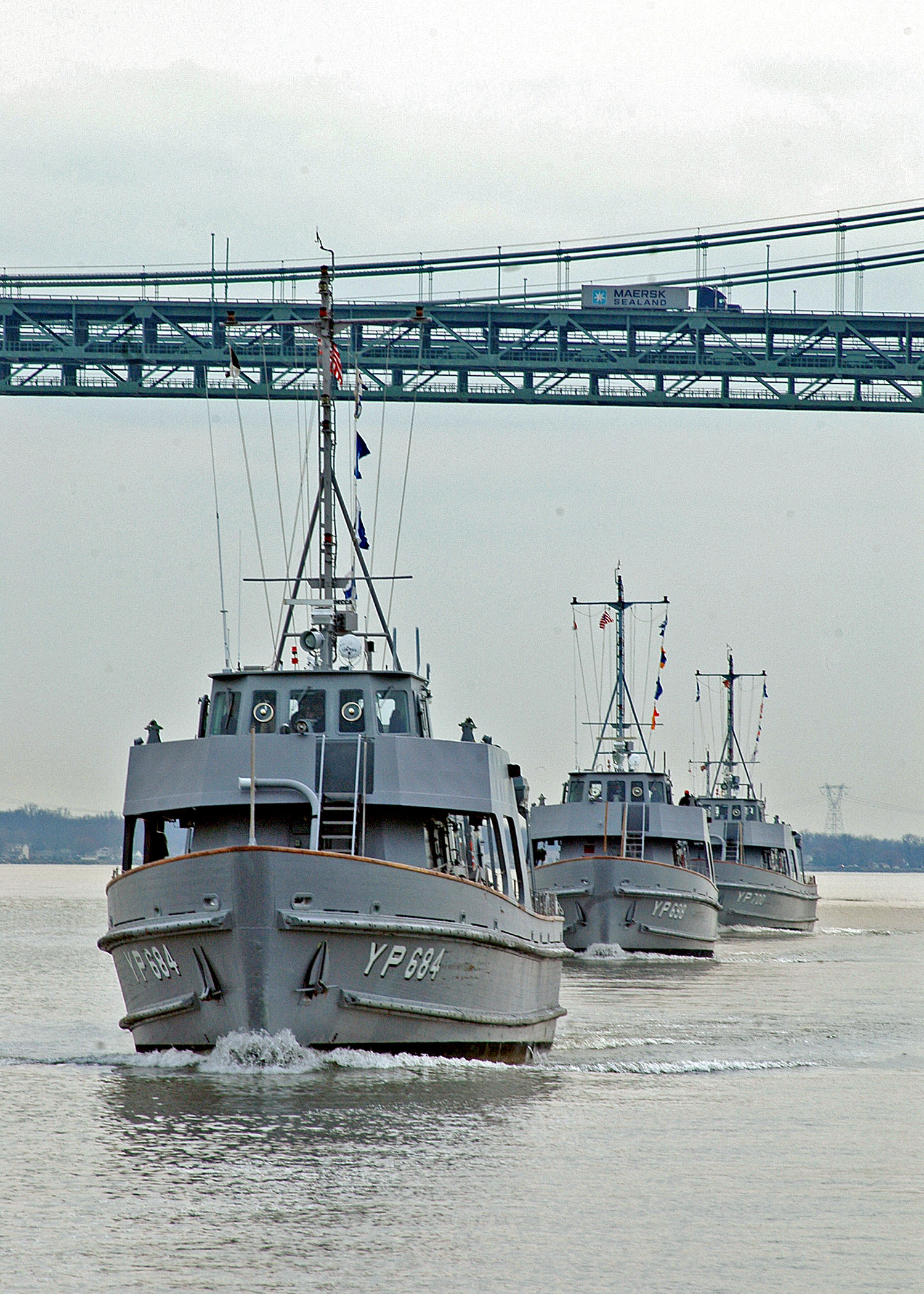
Yard Patrol Craft on the Delaware River in 2006

Yard Patrol craft are used by the United States Navy for training and for research purposes. They are designated as YP in the hull classification symbol system. They were nicknamed "Yippy boats" or "Yippie boats" after the "YP" classification symbol.

== World War II ==
Following the attack on Pearl Harbor the United States Navy leased California-based tuna boats for the duration of the war or "until victory". On 16 February 1942, San Diego Port Director Commander W.J. Morcott called a meeting of tuna skippers and crews at the Naval Reserve Armory telling the men "The Navy needs men to man the [clippers] – experienced men, like yourselves. Needless to say, duty in the war zones will be hazardous". Six hundred tuna boat men volunteered to join their boats in the navy. The boats were painted navy grey and had their names replaced with numerical designations. The ships patrolled the coasts of the United States, the Panama Canal and served in several battles of the South Pacific, particularly the Battle of Guadalcanal.

Two boats, YP-617 and YP-618, were built by Harbor Boat Building, Terminal Island, California, as small refrigerated cargo vessels to supply fresh food to small islands in the South Pacific. Over 250 tons of refrigerated cargo could be carried in ten wood and four steel refrigerated wells. Accommodations were provided for three officers and twenty men. These vessels were designed for easy conversion to tuna clippers post war.

== Modern usage ==
The YPs are used to teach familiarization with water craft, Basic Damage Control and underway instruction of Basic to Advanced Seamanship and Navigation. Yard Patrol craft provide realistic, at-sea training in navigation and seamanship for midshipmen at the U.S. Naval Academy in Annapolis, Maryland and used by the U.S. Naval Sea Cadets Corps for Damage Control, and seamanship for familiarization out in the fleet. These craft can cruise for 1,800 nautical miles (3,300 km) at 12 knots (22 km/h) for five days without refueling.

YP 701 is used at the Naval Undersea Warfare Center Division in Keyport, Washington, to measure mobile underwater target and torpedo radiated noise plus ambient water noise conditions; serve as a platform for deployment of suspended, stationary, in-water acoustic targets during on-range torpedo proof and test operations; deployment of countermeasure emulator during torpedo operations; and deployment of oceanographic measurement instrumentation to determine seawater conductivity and temperature at the depth(s) of interest.

The new Training Patrol Craft (YP) are designated the YP 703 class. The general craft characteristics of the YP 703 class emphasize habitability, training areas, hull structure, integrated bridge, maneuverability, propulsion plant configuration, and, for training purposes only, simulated Underway Replenishment. The main and auxiliary systems and electronics are state-of-the art, Commercial-Off-The-Shelf equipment. Design, construction, and selection of systems, sub-systems, and equipment along with associated software are consistent with reduced Total Ownership Cost and shall facilitate system maintenance and periodic upgrades.

The primary mission of the Training Patrol Craft (YP) is to provide the midshipmen professional training course with practical training afloat on a robust platform to conduct professional development in a safe shipboard environment equipped with systems essential to modern seamanship and navigation. Such training is designed to develop within midshipmen the abilities of an Officer-of the Deck, a proficiency in navigation, and a working knowledge of afloat operations.

== Boat classes ==
=== General characteristics, YP 654 class (YP 663) ===
- Primary Function: Training.
- Builder: Stephens Bros., Inc. (YP 665: Elizabeth City Systems).
- Propulsion: Four 6-71 Detroit Diesel engines 165 shaft horsepower each @ 1800 rpm, 2 propellers.
- Length: Overall: 81 ft, 24 meters; Waterline Length: 77 ft, 23.47 meters.
- Beam: 18 ft, 5.5 meters.
- Displacement: 66 tons full load, 67 metric tons; Dead Weight: 11 tons, 11.5 metric tons.
- Draft: 6 ft, 1.8 meters.
- Speed: 12 knots (22 km/h), 19.6 km/h.
- Range: 1800 NM, 3300 km.
- Hull Material: Wood hull, aluminum superstructure.
- Crew: Officers: 2 Enlisted: 8; Safe capacity: 50 people.
- Ships:
  - (YP-673), Decommissioned, sold 1995, current status in use as US Naval Sea Cadet Corps Training Vessel Pride of Michigan (ON 1247198).

=== General characteristics, YP 676 and YP 696 classes ===
- Primary Function: Training.
- Builder: Peterson Builders (YP 676 through 682) and Marinette Marine (YP 683 through 700). Differences between the YP 676 class and the YP 696 class are only minor configuration changes.
- Propulsion: Two 12V-71N Detroit diesel engines, 2 propellers, horsepower rating 437 shaft horsepower @ 2,100 rpm.
- Length: Overall: 108 feet (32.9 m); Waterline Length: 102 feet (31.1 m).
- Beam: 24 feet (7.3 m).
- Draft: 8 feet (2.5 m).
- Speed: 12 knots (19.6 km/h).
- Range: 1800 nautical miles (3300 km).
- Hull Material: Wood hull, aluminum superstructure.
- Crew: Officers: 2 Enlisted: 4; Safe Capacity: 50 people.
- Ships:

- (T/V Liberator (YP 679)), United States Merchant Marine Academy, Kings Point, NY (USMMA)
- (YP 680-692), United States Naval Academy, Annapolis, MD (USNA)
- (YP 685), decommissioned sold at auction (sales information unavailable)
- (YP 694), United States Naval Academy, Annapolis, MD (USNA)
- (YP 695), United States Naval Academy, Annapolis, MD (USNA)
- (YP 696), Decommissioned (sales information unavailable)
- (YP 697), Decommissioned and sold in 2016 to Vessel Resources Company, Inc. of Seattle, WA which is equipping vessel for future research charters and expeditions
- (YP 698), United States Naval Academy, Annapolis, MD (USNA)
- (YP 700), United States Naval Academy, Annapolis, MD (USNA)
- (YP 701), Naval Undersea Warfare Center Division, Keyport, WA
- (YP 702), Decommissioned (sales information unavailable)

=== General characteristics, YP 703 class ===
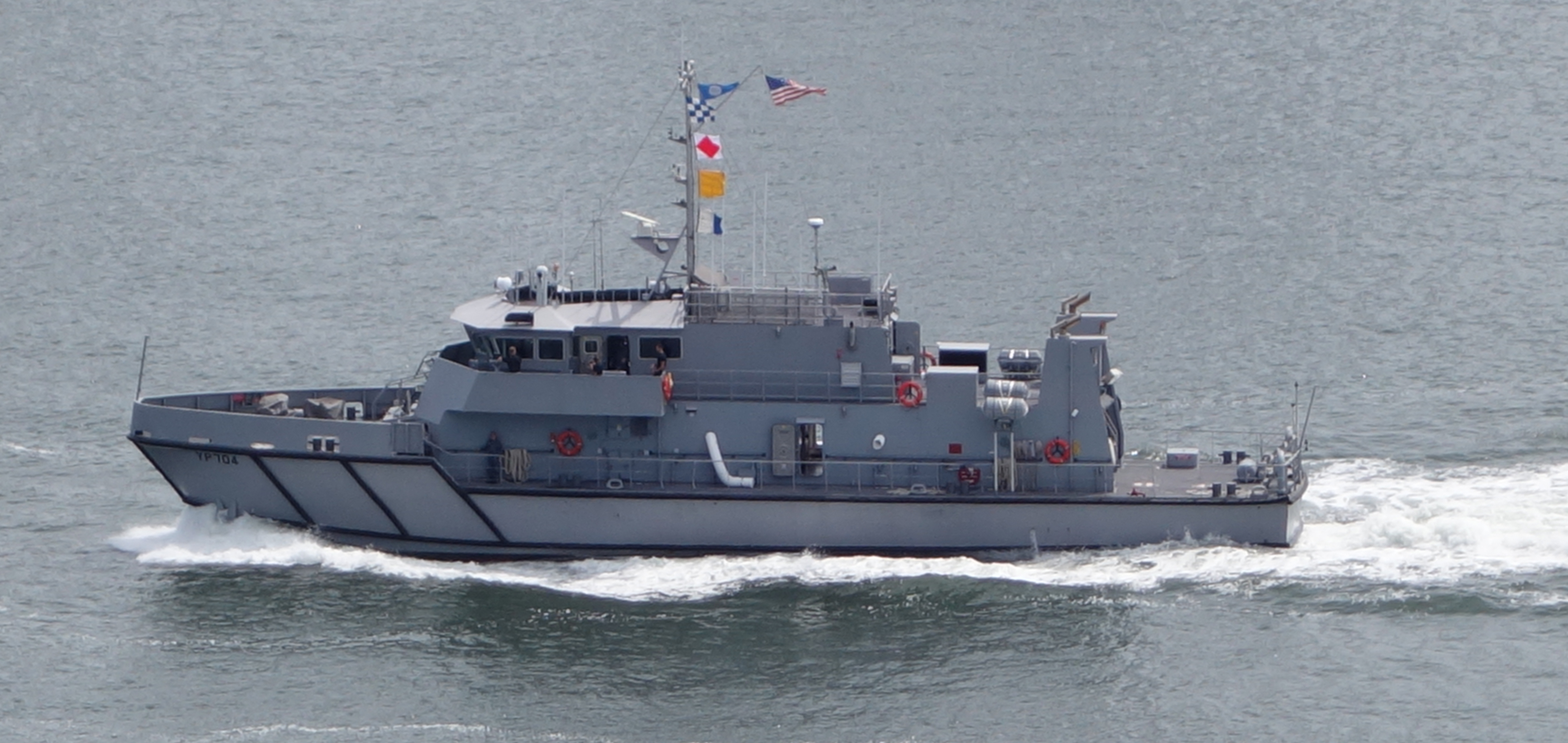
YP704 on East River, NY

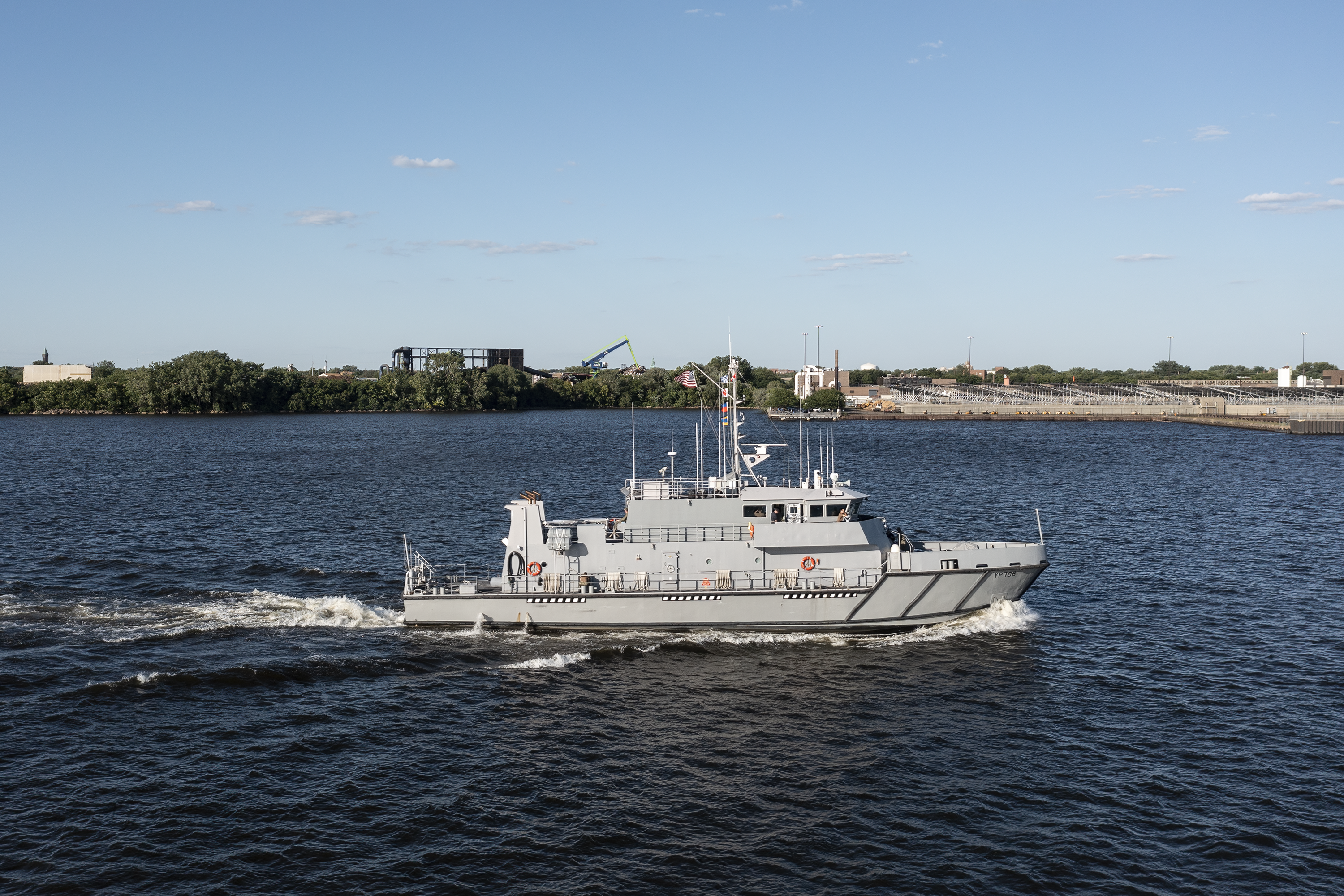
The YP-706 heads downriver on the Delaware River between Camden (background) and Philadelphia.

- Primary Function: Training.
- Builder: C&G Boat Works Inc. (YP 703 through YP 708).
- Propulsion: 2x715 bhp (2x448kW) Cat C-18 diesel engines @ 2,100 rpm, 2 fixed pitch propellers.
- Length: Overall: 119 feet; Waterline Length: 109 feet.
- Beam: 27.9 feet.
- Displacement: 227.6 Metric Tonnes
- Draft: 7.5 feet.
- Speed: 12.6 knots (23.3 kilometers per hour).
- Range: 1680 nautical miles (3,485.5 kilometers).
- Hull Material: Steel.
- Crew: Officers: 4 Enlisted Crew: 6 Midshipmen: 30.
- Ships: welded steel with aluminum superstructure

- (YP 703-708), United States Naval Academy, Annapolis, MD (USNA)

== Gallery ==
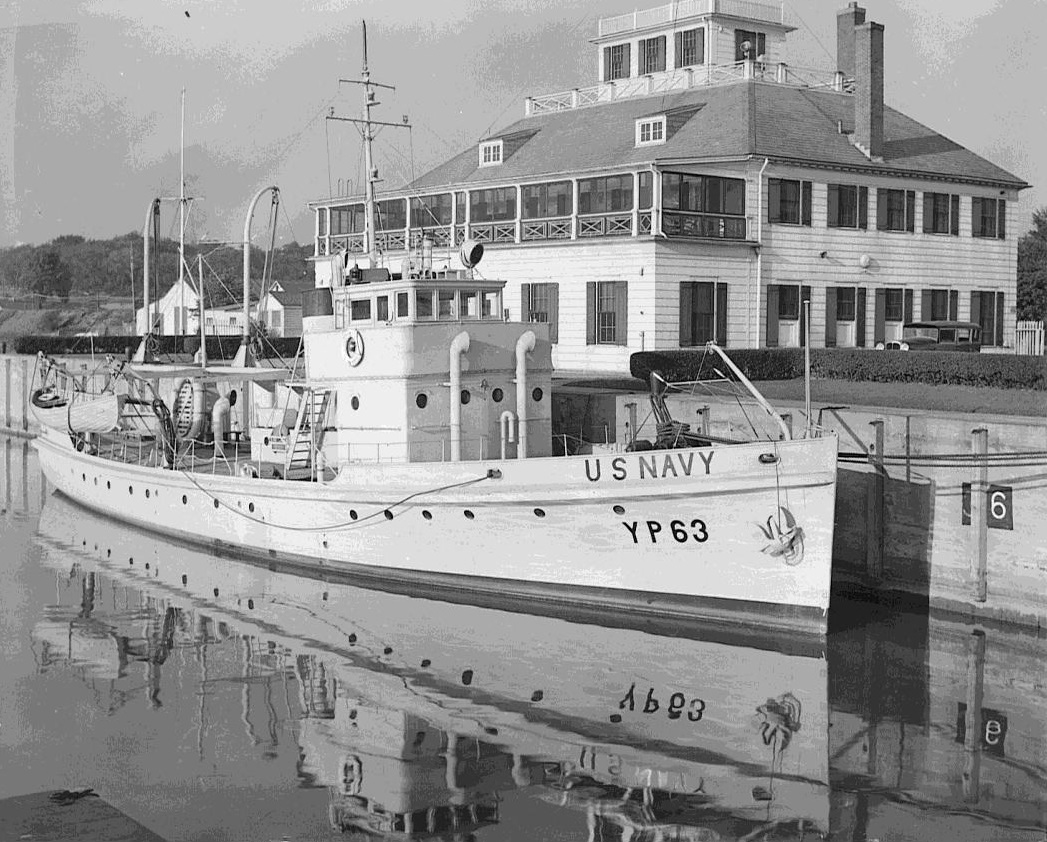
File:USS_YP-63.jpgUSS YP-63, Yard Patrol boat

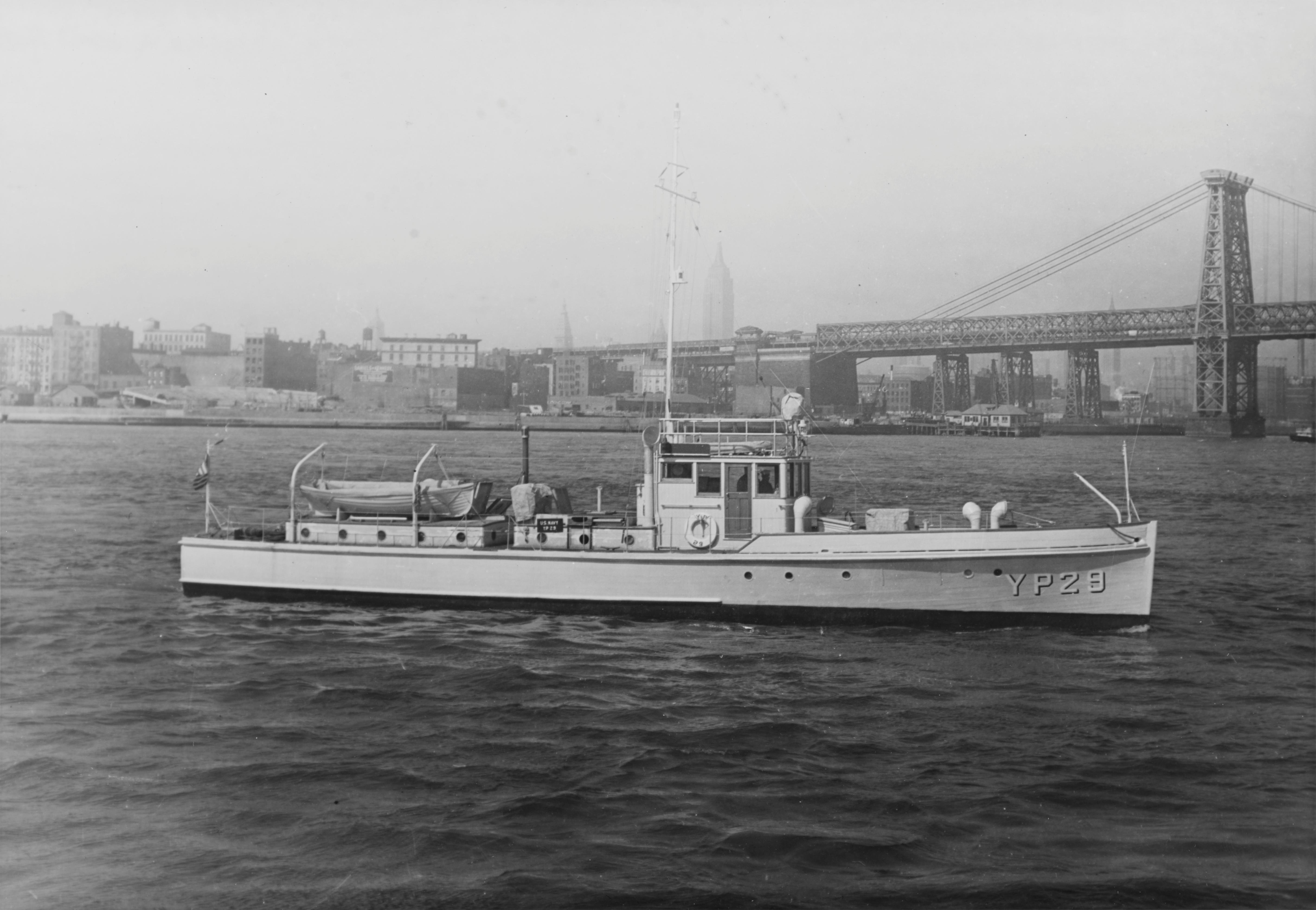
File:19-N-23827_USS_YP-29.jpgUSS YP-29, Yard Patrol boat in 1941

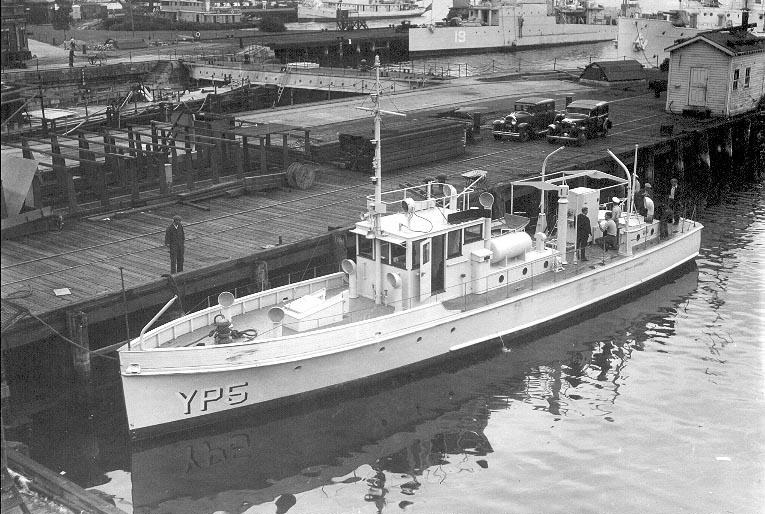
File:USN_Yard_Patrol_Boat_YP-5.jpgYP-5 USN Yard Patrol Boat

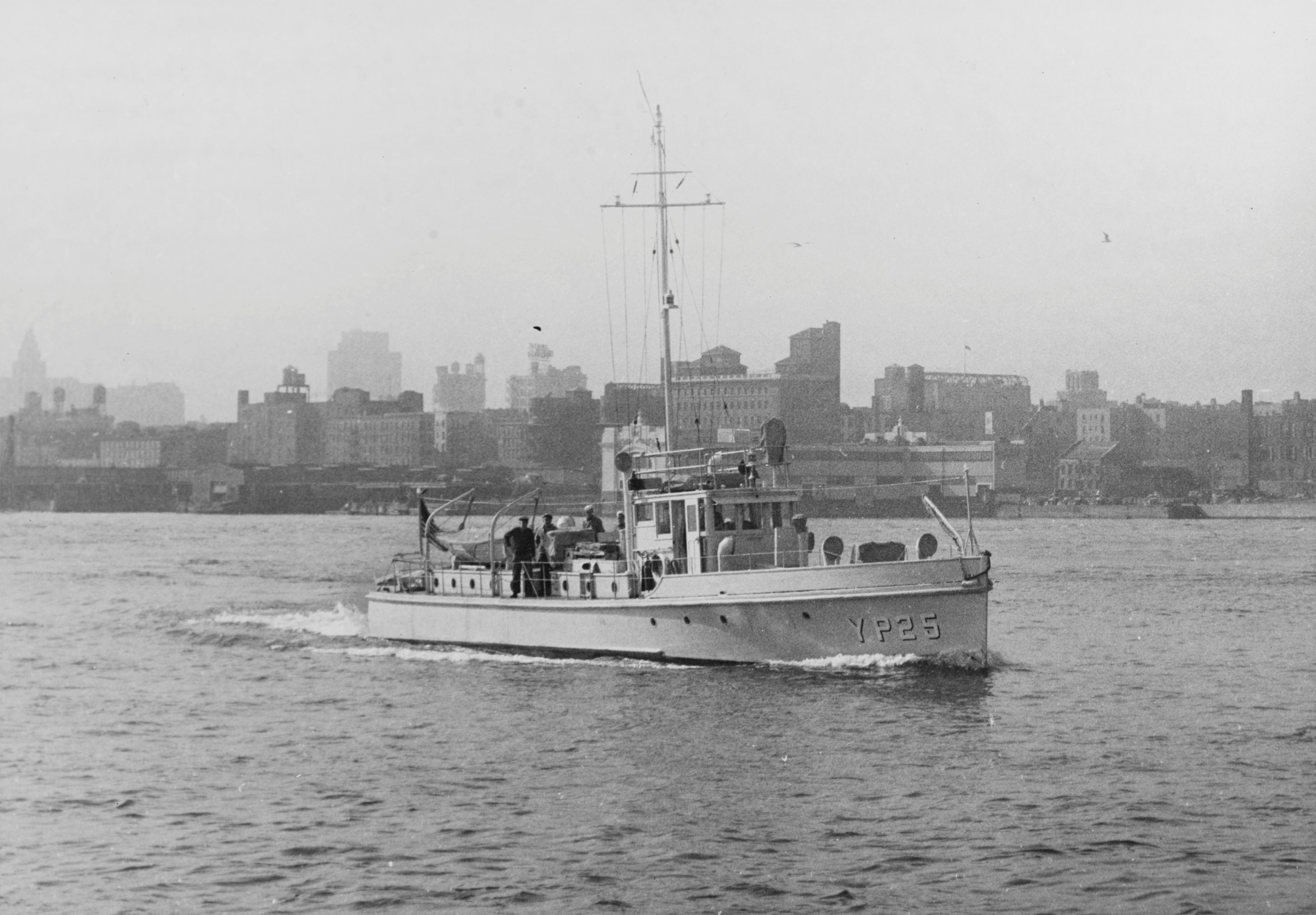
File:19-N-23860_USS_YP-25.jpgUSS YP-25, Yard Patrol boat in 1941

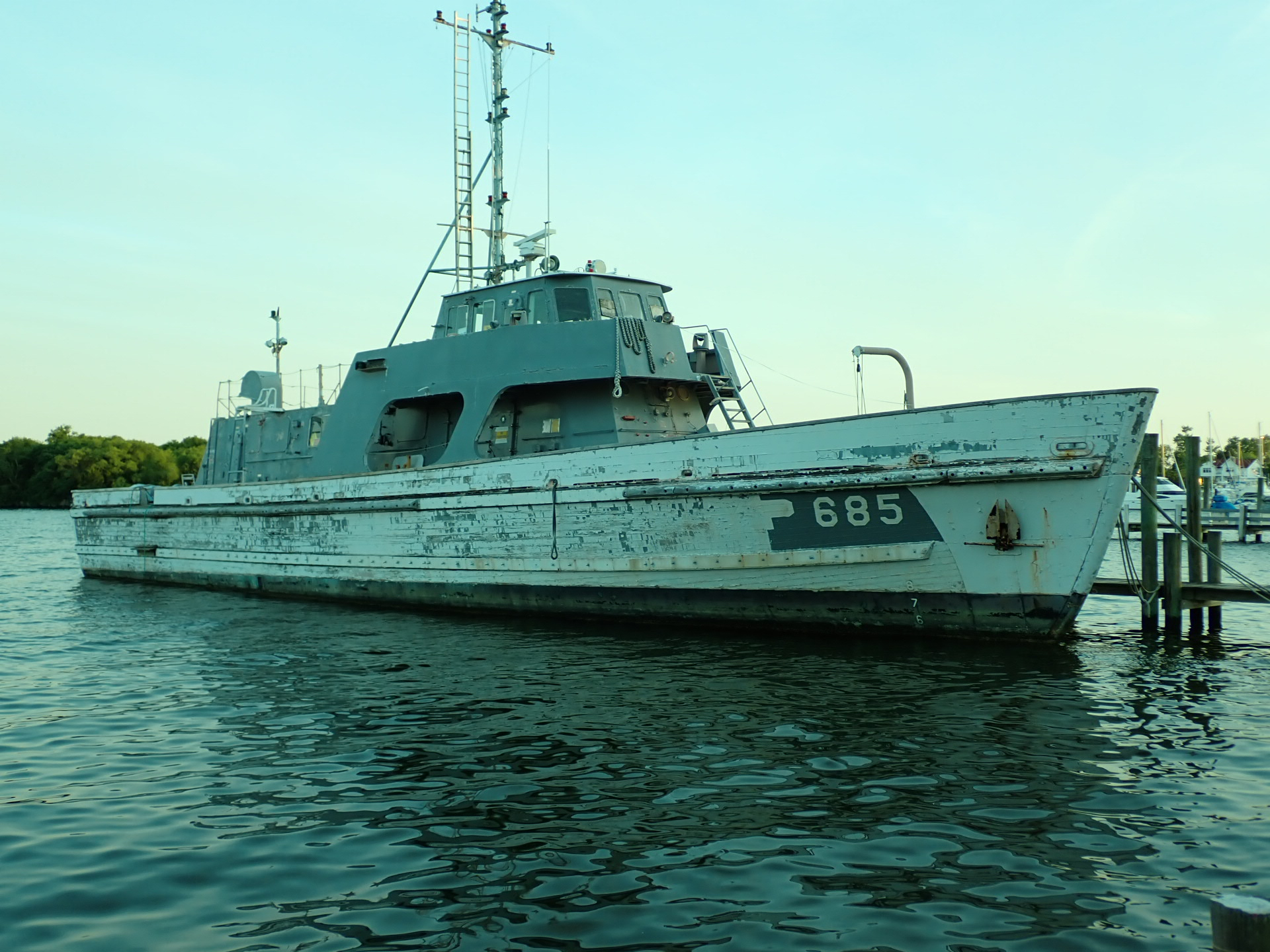
File:YP-685_Patrol_Boat.jpgDecommissioned YP-685 at Solomon's Island, MD on June 5, 2022

== See also ==
- Wooden boats of World War 2
