= Fender (boating) =

Element protecting the hull of a ship

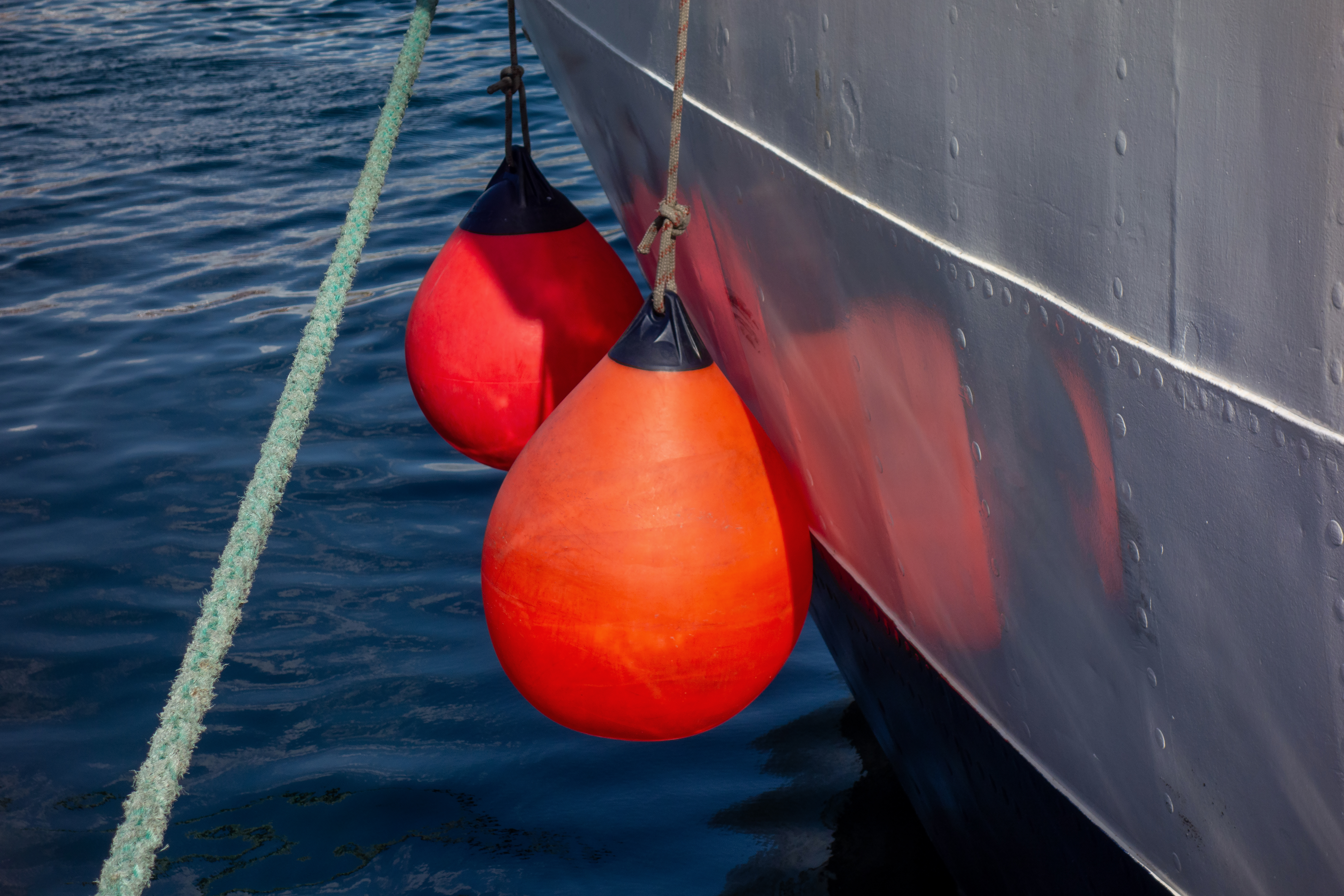
Two orange fenders protecting the side of a moored sailing vessel

In boating, a fender is an air-filled ball or a device in other shape and material used to absorb the kinetic energy of a boat or vessel berthing against a jetty, quay wall or other vessel. Fenders, used on all types of vessels, from cargo ships to cruise ships, ferries and personal yachts, prevent damage to vessels and berthing structures. To do this, fenders have high energy absorption and low reaction force. Fenders are typically manufactured out of rubber, foam elastomer or plastic. Rubber fenders are either extruded or made in a mold. The type of fender that is most suitable for an application depends on many variables, including dimensions and displacement of the vessel, maximum allowable stand-off, berthing structure, tidal variations and other berth-specific conditions. The size of the fender unit is based on the berthing energy of the vessel which is related to the square of the berthing velocity.

Historically, fenders were knotted from rope in a variety of patterns and shapes. Often damaged lines would be used for this, because they could not be used to safely moor a ship or carry a load anymore. Rope fenders are still used today by historic boat owners and are still offered by a small number of sellers.

Yachts, small leisure craft and support vessels typically have mobile fenders which are placed between the boat and the dock as the boat approaches the dock. Docks and other marine structures, such as canal entrances and bases of bridges, have permanent fenders placed to avoid damage from boats. Old tires are often used as fenders in such places.

Fendering is also used on ports and berths as well. The fendering systems act as elastic buffer devices that are used to slow ships down and prevent damage to the ship or dock structure in the mooring process.

== Types ==
=== Ship to berth (STB) fendering ===
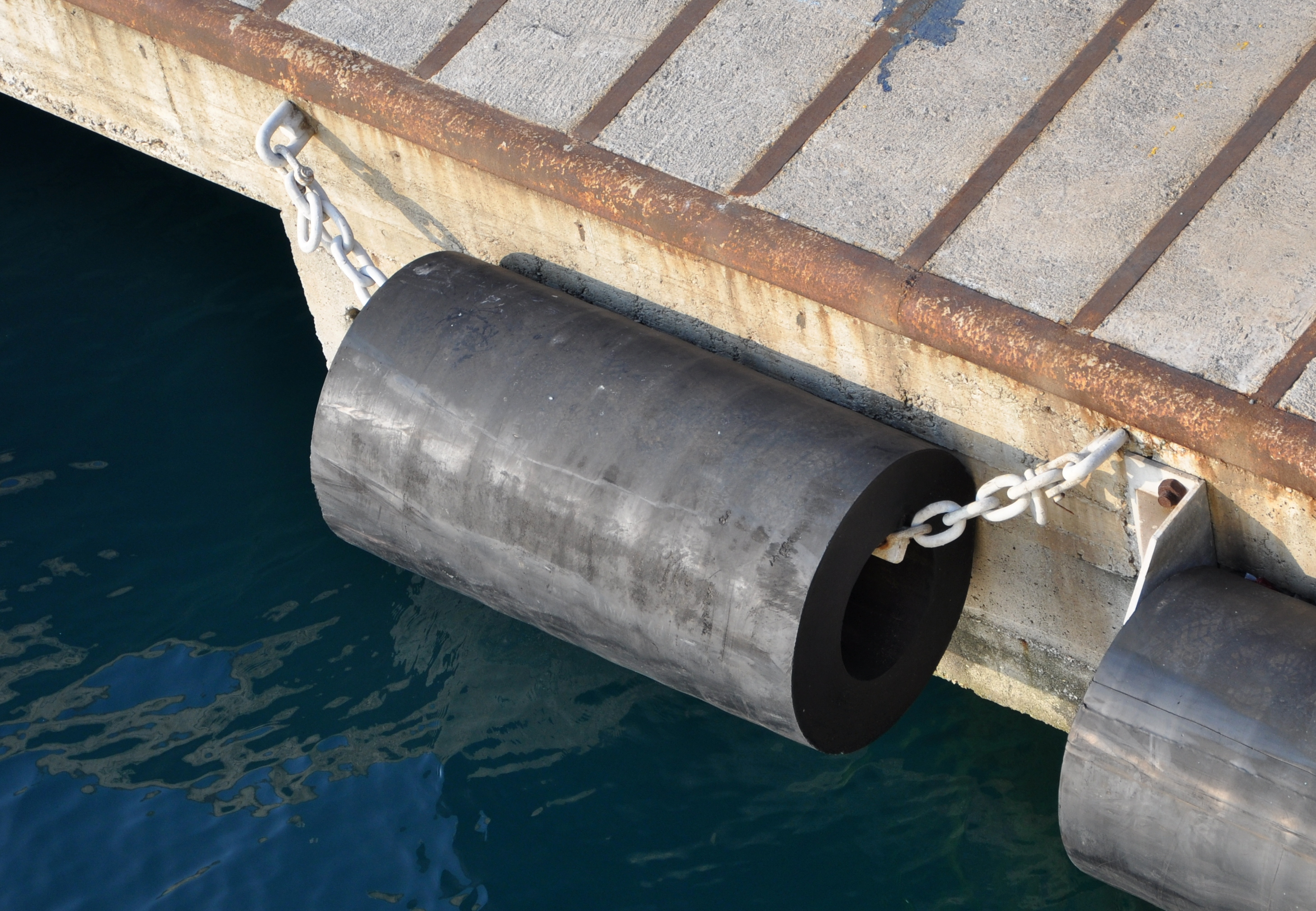
A cylindrical fender in a harbour in Italy

Marine fenders are used at ports and docks on quay walls and other berthing structures. They absorb the kinetic energy of a berthing vessel and thus prevent damage to the vessel or the berthing structure. There are 2 major categories of fenders for port applications: fixed and floating. Fixed fenders are mounted to the berth structure and compose of buckling fenders such as cell fenders, V-type fenders, and non-buckling fenders such as cylindrical fenders. Floating fenders are placed between the berth structure and ship, and include pneumatic fenders and foam-filled fenders.

Fender spacing should be determined by the smallest ship using the berth, as well as the design ships' hull radius of curvature. To ensure all ships can be accommodated at the berth, fender spacing should be about 5–10% of the ship's length for vessels up to 20,000 dwt. Berths handling larger ships can should have a fender spacing of about 25–50% of the ship's length.

Design life of port fenders will vary by ship type, berthing frequency, temperature, saltwater content, and other environmental factors. Fender manufacturers recommend a design life of 5–15 years on berths accepting general cargo, while 10–20 years for more specialized berths such as those accepting tanker ships.

Damaged fendering equipment is the responsibility of either the port owner or ship owner. Port owner responsibility includes damages by ordinary wear and tear by ships, weathering, faulty mounting, incorrect fender type, etc. Ship owner responsibility includes any damages to the fendering system caused by the ship, such as crashing into the berth structure during berthing.

=== Ship to ship (STS) fendering ===
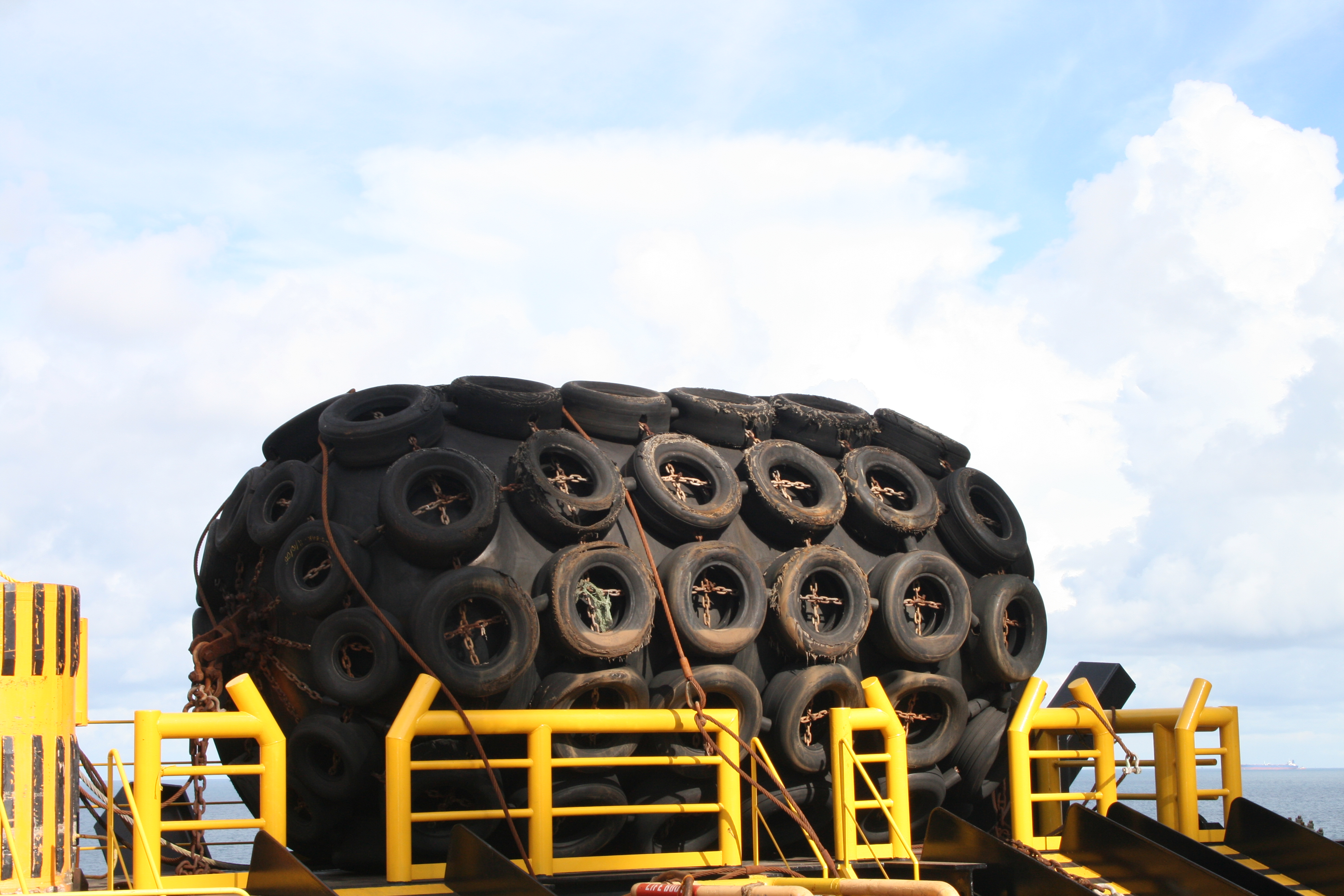
A Yokohama fender

For bunkering operations between two vessels, floating fenders such as pneumatic or foam elastomer fenders are typically used.

== Fender shape, function and application ==
=== Cylindrical fenders ===
Cylindrical fenders are commonly used fenders that ensure safe and linear berthing for different kinds of vessels. Cylindrical (extruded) fenders are an economical solution to protect most berthing structures and offer ease of installation. In France, professional mariners call them "bougnafles."

=== Arch fenders ===
Arch fenders were introduced to improve upon the performance of Cylindrical fenders. Arch fenders have a better Energy / Reaction force ratio and are recommended for all types of applications. The shape of these fenders helps to dissipate the stresses evenly. These extruded fenders are very easy to install and are maintenance-free. They are generally preferred for small to medium range vessels.

=== Cone fenders ===
Cone fenders are an improved version of Cell type Fender recently introduced and recommended for all types of applications, including high tidal variation sites. This advanced feature of the lesser height of fenders improves the material handling capabilities of Deck / Vessel Cranes, which reduces the overall cost of the project. Due to the geometrical shape of the fenders, it can deflect more, and it can absorb more energy from any direction. Maintaining reaction force but doubling energy absorption can be achieved by using two identical cone fenders in a back-to-back arrangement. To distribute the reaction force, cone fenders are typically supplied with large fender panels, which keeps the hull pressure low.

=== Pneumatic fenders ===
These fenders are extensively used for ship to ship transfers at mid seas, double banking operations, and as vessel-to-berth at dock/jetties. The unique property of a pneumatic fender is its low reaction force at low deflection. This property of pneumatic fenders makes them the most suitable fender for liquid cargo vessels and defense vessels with sensitive equipment. These fenders have excellent energy absorption characteristics and linear load-deflection characteristics. Pneumatic fenders should comply to the ISO 17357 standard. The pneumatic fender is also known as the Yokohama fender or floating fender. Four basic types of pneumatic fenders comply with the international standard: Type I (Chain&Tyre Net Type), Type II (Sling Type), Type III (Rib Type), and Type IV (Rope Net Type). It has become an ideal ship protection medium used extensively by large tankers, LPG vessels, ocean platforms, etc. The most appropriate type will depend on its application and the requirements of the equipment.

=== Hydro-pneumatic fenders ===
The submarine hydro-pneumatic fender (SHPF), first developed in the 1980s, is a unique fender system designed to provide minimal hull pressure loads and soft compression during berthing and a large stand-off to accommodate the sizeable bulbous shape of the submarine. Its pneumatic fenders body is more robust than standard pneumatic fenders and is equipped with a specially designed counterweight to keep the fender vertical in the water. Each SHPF system is customized specially for each type or class of submarine, depending on its water-air ratio, the shape of the hull, berthing-type, energy absorption, and jetty design.

=== Foam elastomer fenders ===
These fenders are typically made of a closed-cell Polyethylene foam core, which is encapsulated in nylon or Kevlar reinforced Polyurethane skin. The performance of foam elastomer fenders is comparable to that of a pneumatic fender, but the fenders will not lose their function in case the skin gets punctured. Foam elastomer fenders cannot deflate.

=== D fenders ===
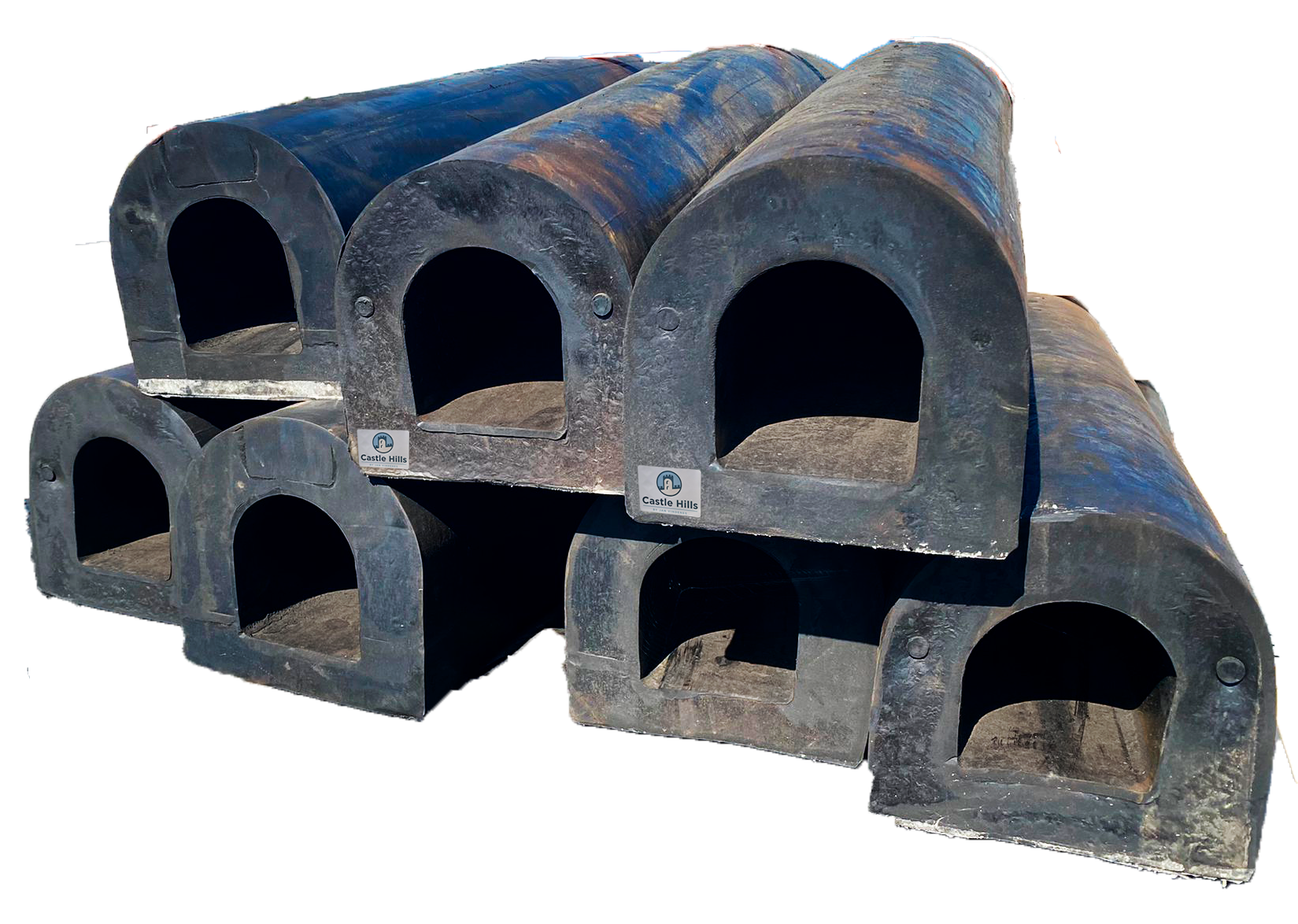
A pile of D fenders

D-type fenders are commonly used on vessels as well as small jetties. D fenders are extruded in solid rubber (hollow and solid sections) in water and weather resistant EPDM compound. Similar to that of D fenders, Double D fenders (or known as B fenders) are also extruded and provided with steel inserts if required. D fenders are relatively simple to install onto vessels, ensuring that the surface is cleaned and free of any remnants of past fenders.

=== Corner fenders ===
45 degree shaped fenders are commonly used on docks to protect incoming vessels. They are typically compression-molded with steel inserts if required.

=== Square fenders ===
Square fenders are commonly used on vessels as well as small jetties. They are compression-molded fenders generally used on tugs, boats, and ships. They have excellent seawater resistance and resistance to ozone aging and ultraviolet rays.

=== Keyhole fenders ===
Keyhole fenders are the most versatile bow, stem fenders used on tugboats, and small port craft/ferries. They offer maximum protection to tugs/ferries with their typical profile and load-absorbing capabilities.

=== Tugboat fenders ===
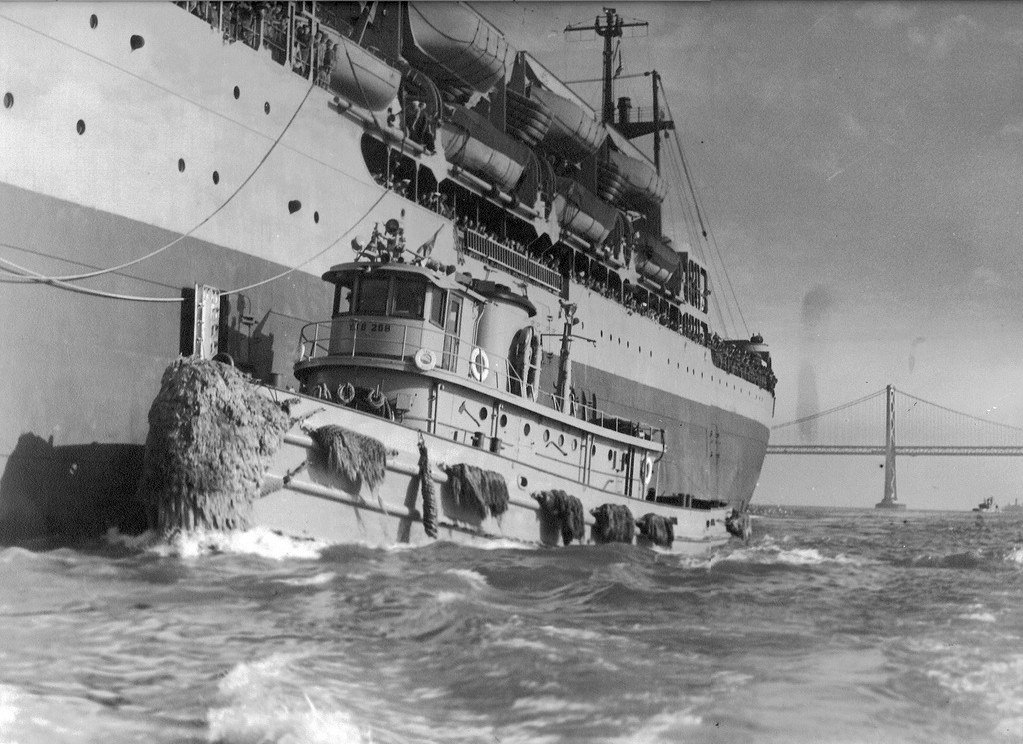
Red Cloud (foreground), a type V2-ME-A1 tug, alongside USNS David C. Shanks, outside the Oakland Bay Bridge in San Francisco Bay, California, 1950s. On the bow is a tugboat fender, also called beards or bow pudding, which are rope padding to protect the bow.

Tugboat fenders are made of high-abrasion-resistance rubber with good resilience properties. They are very popular with small port craft owners and tug owners. These fenders are compression molded in high-pressure thermic-fluid-heated molds and have excellent seawater resistance. Tugboat fenders are also called beards or bow pudding. In the past, they were made of rope for padding to protect the bow.

=== Solid rubber fender ===
Solid rubber fenders have a long history and come in a wide range of anti-collision equipment. They operate by managing shear, rotation, and compression forces depending on the fender structure. Designs include D type, cone type, drum type, fan-shaped, rectangular, and cylindrical. Solid rubber fenders have high energy absorption and reaction force, are low cost, have a long service life, and are easy to install and maintain. In addition to their use on vessels, they are often found protecting docks as well.

=== Floating rubber fender ===
Floating rubber fenders made of solid rubber are newer protective shipboard equipment. They feature sizeable compressive deformation energy absorption, low reaction force, ability to sail, and easy installation. They can adapt to changes in the tide for dockside installations. Types of floating rubber fender include pneumatic fender and foam filled fender. There is a slight difference between the two types in structures, materials, price, and applications.

== Fender design ==
There are a number of different standards used worldwide to design fender systems. The most commonly used one, is the PIANC "Guidelines for the design of fender systems, 2002", which is the update of its predecessor from 1984. In Japan the Japanese Industrial Standards (JIS) are commonly used, whereas in the United Kingdom and the United States of America, the British Standard BS 6349:part 4 still used quite regularly.

Designing a fender system basically is determining what the berthing energy of a vessel or range of vessels will be, then determine what capacity the fender needs to have to absorb that kinetic energy and finally how to find a way to avoid the reaction force creating too much hull pressure. In principle, a berthing energy calculation is a simple kinetic energy calculation, adjusted for specific behaviour of a berthing vessel or the specific characteristics of the berthing location or structure.
