= USS Pocahontas (YT-266) =

Tugboat of the United States Navy

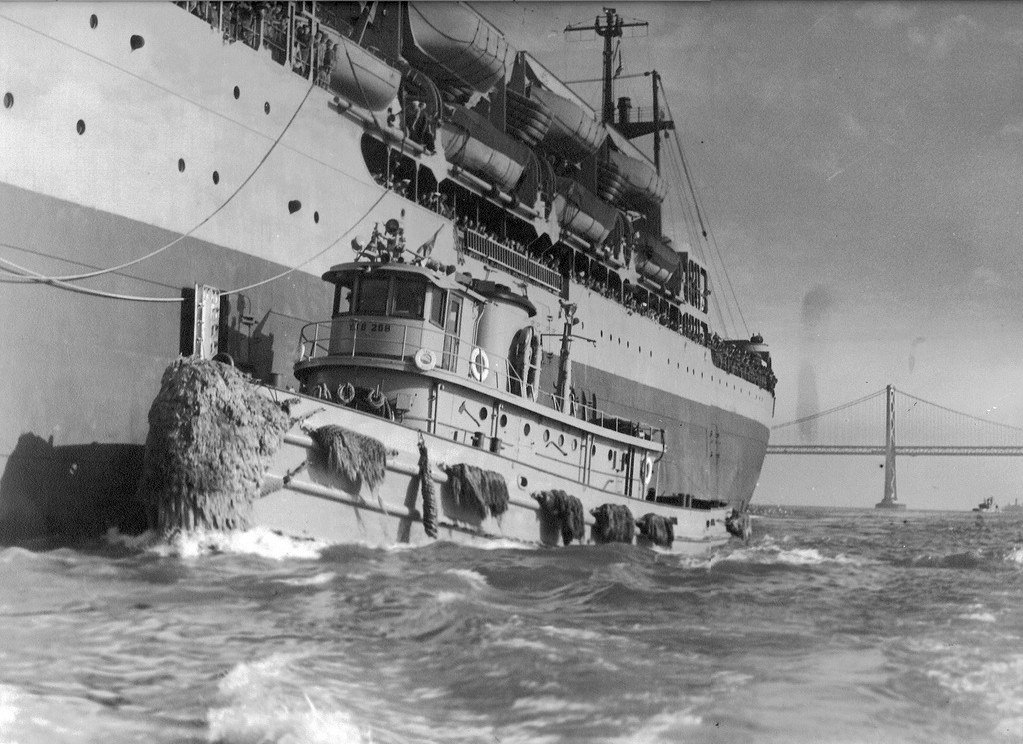
- Red Cloud (YTB-268), a type V2-ME-A1, same as Pocahontas, alongside David C. Shanks, outside the Oakland Bay Bridge in San Francisco Bay, California, 1950s

History

United States
- Name: Port Blakely
- Namesake: Port Blakely
- Owner: Maritime Commission
- Ordered: as type (V2-ME-A1) hull, MCE hull 433
- Awarded: 23 August 1941
- Builder: Birchfield Boiler, Inc., Tacoma, Washington
- Cost: $301,042
- Yard number: 1
- Laid down: 27 October 1941
- Launched: 1 May 1942
- Fate: Transferred to the US Navy, 31 December 1942

United States
- Name: Pocahontas
- Namesake: Pocahontas
- Owner: US Navy
- Acquired: 31 December 1942
- Reclassified: From harbor tug (YT-266) to large harbor tug (YTB-266) 15 May 1944; To medium harbor tug (YTM-266) February 1962
- Identification: Hull symbol: YT-266; YTB-266 (15 May 1944); YTM-266 (February 1962); Callsign: NYIO
- Fate: Scrapped, 25 February 2019

General characteristics
- Class & type: Hiawatha-class tugboat
- Type: Harbor tug
- Displacement: 237 long tons (241 t)
- Length: 100 ft (30 m)
- Beam: 25 ft (7.6 m)
- Draft: 9 ft 7 in (2.92 m)
- Installed power: Enterprise DMQ-8 Diesel engine; 700 shp (520 kW)
- Propulsion: Single propeller
- Speed: 16 kn (30 km/h; 18 mph)
- Crew: 14
- Armament: 2 × 0.50 in (12.70 mm) heavy machine guns

USS Pocahontas (YT/YTB/YTM-266), was a type V2-ME-A1 harbor tug that entered service in the United States Navy in 1943, and was sold in 1976. She was the third ship to bear the name Pocahontas.

== History ==
Pocahontas was laid down, under Maritime Commission contract, as Port Blakeley (MC hull 433) by Birchfield Boiler Incorporated, Tacoma, Washington on 27 October 1941. She was launched 2 May 1942, sponsored by Mrs. Alvin Davies.

Renamed Pocahontas (YT–266) on 4 July 1942, she was delivered to the Maritime Commission and transferred to the Navy on 31 December 1942; and placed in service, in the 11th Naval District, 16 March 1943.

Redesignated YTB–266, 15 May 1944, served the 11th Naval District, headquartered at San Diego, until after World War II. Between 1946 and 1955, she operated in the 12th Naval District, headquartered at San Francisco, then returned to the 11th Naval District. Redesignated YTM–266 in February 1962, she continued to provide tug and towing services to that district.

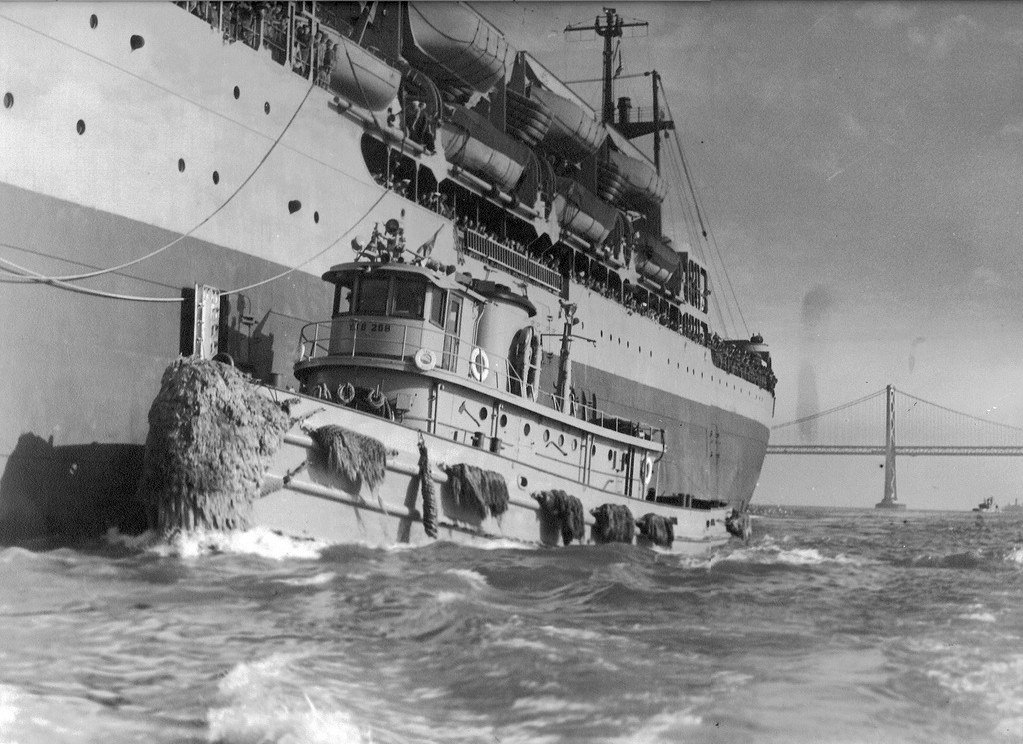
Red Cloud, a type V2-ME-A1 tugboat, same as Pocahontas, alongside USNS David C. Shanks at the Golden Gate, San Francisco, California, in the 1950s

Pocahontas was sold to Crowley Maritime in 1972 and provided tug services until purchased by her present owners in 1997. She was sold for scrap at Sausalito, 25 February 2019.

== Awards ==
USS Pocahontas earned the American Campaign Medal, the World War II Victory Medal and the National Defense Service Medal for her service in the U.S. Navy.

== See also ==
- Sotoyomo-class fleet tug
- Victory ships
- Liberty ship
- Type C1 ship
- Type C2 ship
- Type C3 ship
- United States Merchant Marine Academy
- List of auxiliaries of the United States Navy

== Bibliography ==
- "Port Blakely".
- "Pocahontas (YTM-266)". NavSource. 30 March 2018.
- "Pocahontas IV (YT-266)". Dictionary of American Naval Fighting Ships. Naval History and Heritage Command. 21 August 2015. This article incorporates text from this source, which is in the public domain.
