= RV Pax =

Navy minesweeper converted to yacht

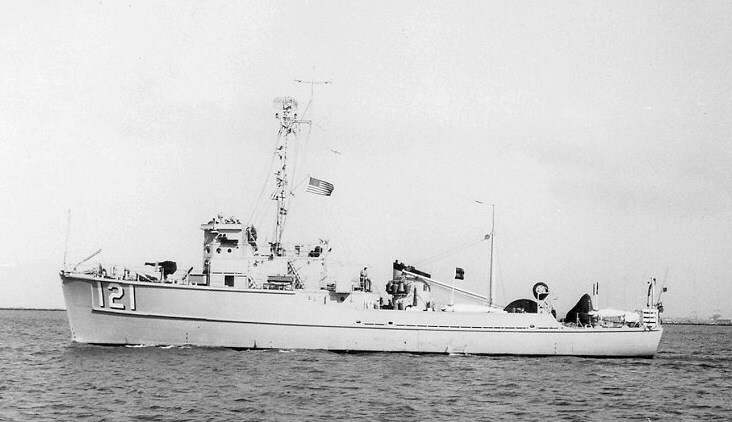
- Broadside view of Bluebird, a minesweeper of the same class, taken off the south end of Mare Island on 29 September 1953.

Class overview
- Name: Beemster class
- Builders: George W. Kneass Co.; San Francisco, California
- Naval architects: Sparkman and Stephens
- Built: 1951-1954
- In commission: 1953-1976

General characteristics (1954)
- Type: Minesweeper
- Displacement: 384 t (378 long tons)
- Length: 43.94 m (144 ft 2 in)
- Beam: 8.5 m (27 ft 11 in)
- Draft: 2.28 metres (7 ft 6 in)
- Propulsion: 2 propellers; 880 hp (660 kW); 2 x General Motors diesel engines
- Speed: 13.6 knots (25.2 km/h; 15.7 mph)
- Crew: 37
- Armament: 1 x double 20 mm machine guns

History

USA
- Name: AMS/MSC-148
- Laid down: 29 April 1952
- Launched: 11 April 1953
- Commissioned: 21 April 1954
- Fate: Transferred to Royal Netherlands Navy

Netherlands
- Name: Breskens (M855)
- Operators: Royal Netherlands Navy
- Acquired: 21 April 1954
- Fate: Returned to US custody 1976; Sold to Harry Pound scrapyard, Portsmouth, England

Australia
- Name: Kalbarrie (Motor yacht)
- Owner: Mir Barkat Ali Khan Mukarram Jah, Asaf Jah VIII
- Acquired: 1978
- Fate: Seized by the Sheriff of Western Australia due to unpaid bills 1988

Australia
- Name: Kalbarrie (Motor yacht)
- Owner: Sheriff of Western Australia
- Acquired: 1988
- Fate: Sold to Pax Scientific Inc.

Australia
- Name: R/V Pax
- Owner: PAX Scientific Pty Ltd
- Acquired: 1991
- Fate: Donated to a not-for-profit organisation 2012

Australia
- Name: R/V Pax
- Owner: Project PAX for Veterans of Western Australia Inc.
- Acquired: 2012
- Fate: Sank at her moorings June 2015. Raised July 2015 and scrapped December 2015.

RV Pax built in 1952-54 as AMS/MSC148 a wooden minesweeper, was one of 160 of the Bluebird class, 14 of which were given to the Royal Netherlands Navy under the Mutual Defense Assistance Program (MDAP), where they were known as the Beemster class and where she was known as MS855, Breskens. In 1976 when she was no longer required as a minesweeper she was offered for sale at Harry Pound's scrapyard in Portsmouth, England. Her later activities included suspected gold, jewellery, and drug smuggling.

== Conversion to luxury yacht Kalbarrie ==
In 1978 the former minesweeper was purchased from Harry Pound by Prince Mukarram Jah, the titular Eighth Nizam of Hyderabad, with a view to her conversion to a luxury yacht. Similar conversions of former minesweepers had been carried out for Jacques Cousteau's research vessel Calypso in 1950 and John Wayne's yacht Wild Goose in 1962.

According to the Guinness Book of Records, Prince Jah's inheritance from the Seventh Nizam of Hyderabad in 1967 made him the world's richest person at that time, with a fortune estimated in 2023 terms to have been equivalent to $4.25 billion.

In 1972 Prince Jah left Hyderabad to live at a half-million-acre sheep station in Western Australia. He had a penchant for tinkering with machinery and the minesweeper's big twin stainless steel diesel engines formed part of his attraction to the vessel. The Kalbarrie, as she would later be named, was sailed via India to Singapore for conversion, including the creation of dozens of secret compartments that could be used to smuggle jewellery and priceless antiques from the Prince's palaces in India to his mansion in Perth, Western Australia.

When Kalbarrie arrived in Fremantle, Western Australia in September 1981, customs officials threatened to seize her because she had been imported without permission. She was allowed to remain in Fremantle until repairs had been completed in August 1982, then sailed for Port Moresby, Papua New Guinea. En route, she was intercepted by customs off Broome, who searched the boat for drugs and charged one crew member with possession of cannabis. She returned to Fremantle via Townsville, where she remained until August 1984.

After sailing from Townsville for Fremantle on August 15 Kalbarrie lost a man overboard off the Western Australian coast on September 9.

In following years Kalbarrie was a luxurious venue of many Perth society parties, especially during the defence of the America's Cup off Fremantle, held from January 31 to February 4, 1987.

Shortly afterwards in 1987 Kalbarrie was hoisted onto a slipway in Fremantle for repairs to its hull and to fix a damaged keel. A year later she remained there, as the company completing the repairs – Franmarine – refused to release her until the AU$100,000 it was owed had been paid. Prince Jah refused to pay, claiming he had been overcharged, but in reality was unable to do so through inability to access funds due to a freezing of his assets by Swiss bankers. After prolonged dispute and lack of settlement the vessel was seized by the Sheriff of Western Australia. Desperate to regain her, Prince Jah sold some remaining assets including a two-door Rolls-Royce car and arrived to pay the debt only to find that just two hours earlier an offer for a reputed AU$66,000 had been accepted and paid.

== Service as a research vessel ==
In January 1991 Western Australia-born biomimetics engineer Jay Harman was looking for a suitable boat to serve as a base for marine research focusing on the drag and friction reduction strategies of sea creatures and seaweeds when he discovered the Kalbarrie on Franmarine's slipway in Fremantle. Prince Jah had not paid the outstanding bill for her repairs and Harman was able to negotiate a scrap value purchase price with Kalbarrie's custodian, the Sheriff of Western Australia.

Renaming her R/V Pax, Harman set about adapting her as a floating biomimicry laboratory, which service she performed for the next twenty years, playing an important role in what has now become Pax Scientific Pty Ltd and its associated subsidiary companies. During this time Harman says "The exciting thought of finding [smuggled jewellery] was never far from my mind. I searched high and low with no luck, though I did find a number of empty secret compartments."

== Acquisition by not-for-profit organisation ==
Madeleine Whitburn, whose husband Norm was a Royal Australian Navy veteran suffering post-traumatic stress disorder as a result of post naval experiences serving as a fireman for many years, was watching television one Sunday evening in 2012 when there was a feature on a former research vessel in need of renovation being offered free to a worthy cause. She immediately thought of its possible use as a floating men's shed and mentioned it to Norm. Together, they devised a proposal for the vessel's use as a project and meeting place for ex-servicemen and women, and first responders, and received support from the vessel's owner, Jay Harman, and regulatory approval for the formation of Project PAX for Veterans of Western Australia Inc.

Following media publicity, Project Pax quickly recruited many retired navy servicemen including engineers and shipwrights, together with former firemen, and contact was established with several European groups that had undertaken restoration of similar ex-minesweepers.

On a Sunday in July 2014 a social gathering was held on board Pax that was attended by three visitors to Perth with strong connections to her history – Jay Harman and his wife Francesca Bertone, who had owned Pax for twenty years, and John Zubrzycki, author of The Last Nizam, a comprehensive biography of Mukarram Jah, the prince who had owned Pax for a decade and brought her to Australia from the other side of the world.

== Ultimate fate ==
In May 2015 it became necessary to move Pax from a jetty to a mid-harbour mooring, where a month later she started taking on water at her buoy during heavy weather and was pushed to the shoreline to prevent her sinking. She was later deemed beyond further attempt at economic repair and restoration, and scrapped at Henderson in December 2015.

== See also ==
- "Mukarram Jah, Nizam of Hyderabad". Obituaries. The Daily Telegraph. 24 January 2023. p. 25.
- "Mukarram Jah". Obituaries. The Times. 31 January 2023. p. 47.
- Traub, Alex (9 February 2023). "Mukarram Jah, 89, Heir to an Opulent Throne He Abandoned, Is Dead". Obituaries. The New York Times. p. A25.
- Zubrzycki, John (9 February 2023). "Indian prince fell for WA station life". Obituaries. The West Australian. p. 46.
