= Eureka Shipbuilding =

Shipyard in Eureka, California, United States

Coordinates: 40°43′28″N 124°12′54″W

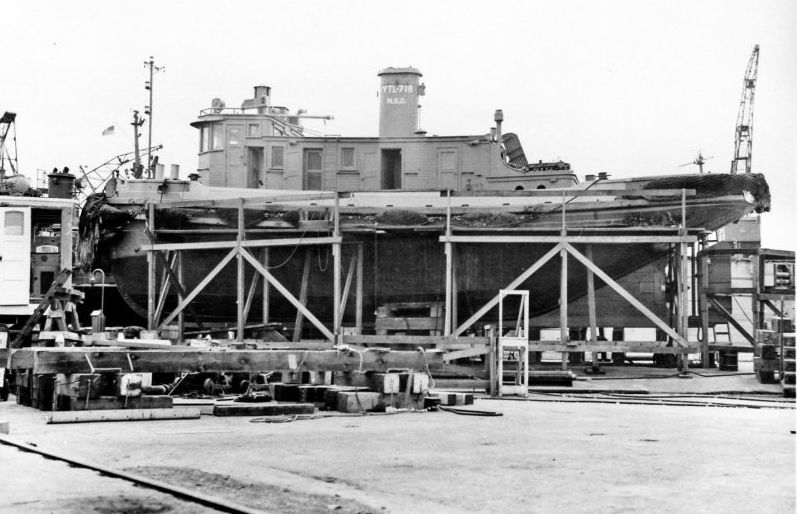
Eureka Shipbuilding built YT 718, a V2-M-AL1 tugboat drydock 8 November 1945

Eureka Shipbuilding was a wooden shipbuilding company in Eureka, California. The shipyard was just south of town in Fields Landing on the South Bay of Humboldt Bay. To support the World War 2 demand for ships Eureka Shipbuilding shipyard switched over to military construction and built: United States Marine Corps tugboatss. Eureka Shipbuilding was started in 1941. On January 25, 1943 Eureka Ship Builders, Inc. was awarded a contract to build six V2-M-AL1 tugboats at a cost of $35,970 each, contact number DA-MCc-824. V2-M-AL1 tus is a class of Type V ship. The V2-M-AL1 is also called a Port Sewall class tug. V2-V2-M-AL1 tugs were named for American ports. All of Eureka Shipbuilding tug were used for Lend-Lease use to Britain as type TUSA tugs. After the war in 1947 the company was renamed `

V2-M-AL1 tugboats were: Wood hull, 90 tons, a beam of 19 feet, had a diesel engine with 240 horsepower, fuel Oil tanks with 1920 gallons. Other Built V2-M-AL1 were built by Puget Sound Naval Shipyard, Standard Shipbuilding, Steinbach Iron works, Arlington Shipbuilding, Texas Shipbuilding, Siletz Boatworks, Blair Company, and Marinette Marine.

== Eureka Shipbuilding ships ==
- Tugboats, V2-M-AL1 Port Sewall class:

Hull #	Ship ID	Name	Owner	Type	#	Tons	Feet.	Delivered	Notes
1		Port Costa	U.S.M.C.	V2-M-AL1	1566	90d	66	Jan-44	To Britain as a TUSA as YN 1
2		Port San Luis	U.S.M.C.	V2-M-AL1	1567	90d	66	Feb-44	To Britain as a TUSA as YN 2
3		Port Chicago	U.S.M.C.	V2-M-AL1	1568	90d	66	Mar-44	To Britain as a TUSA as YN 3
4		Port Gamble	U.S.M.C.	V2-M-AL1	1569	90d	66	Apr-44	To Britain as a TUSA as YN 4
5		Port Tobacco	U.S.M.C.	V2-M-AL1	1570	90d	66	Jun-44	To Britain as a TUSA as YN 5
6	254364	Port Haywood	U.S.M.C.	V2-M-AL1	1571	90d	66	Jul-44	To Britain as TUSA 229, to USN as YT 718, sold 1947 as Limpiar VI (YTL= Yard tug, little)

== Eureka Boat Building & Repair ==
Eureka Boat Building & Repair built boats:

Hull #	Ship ID.	Name	Owner	Type	Tons	Ft.	Delivered	Notes
1	251558	A. N. Lucido	Frank J. Leard	Fishing	42g	47	1947	
2	253402	Vitina A	Diego Aranclo	Fishing	52g	51	1947	Renamed Anna S

== See also ==
- California during World War II
- Maritime history of California
- Union Iron Works
- Richmond Shipyards
- Kneass Boat Works
- Pacific Bridge Company
- Wooden boats of World War 2
- Cryer & Sons
