= USS Namequa =

Tugboat of the United States Navy

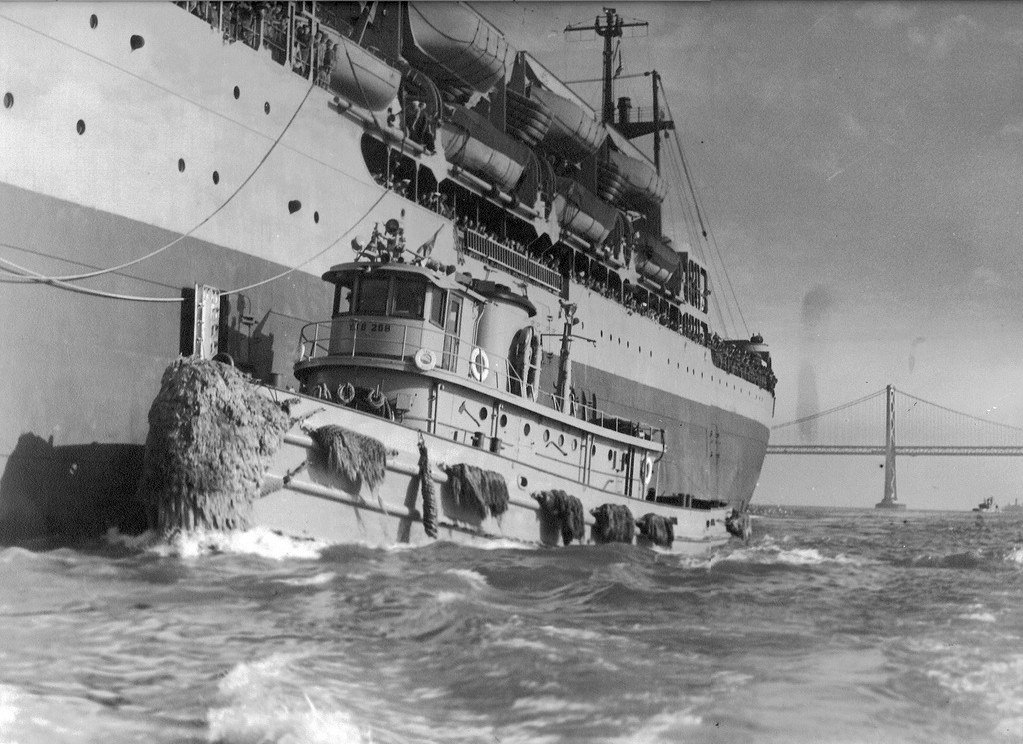
- Red Cloud (YTB-268), a type V2-ME-A1, same as the Namequa, alongside USNS David C. Shanks (T-AP-180), outside the Oakland Bay Bridge in San Francisco Bay, California, 1950s

History

United States
- Name: USS Namequa
- Builder: Calumet Shipyard and Dry Dock Co., Chicago, Illinois
- Laid down: early 1942
- Launched: 22 May 1942, as Port Elizabeth
- Commissioned: 17 February 1943
- Renamed: Namequa (YT–331), 29 September 1942
- Stricken: June 1950

General characteristics
- Class & type: Hiawatha-class yard tug
- Displacement: 237 long tons (241 t)
- Length: 100 ft (30 m)
- Beam: 25 ft (7.6 m)
- Draft: 9 ft 7 in (2.92 m)
- Speed: 16 knots (30 km/h; 18 mph)
- Complement: 12
- Armament: None

USS Namequa (YT-331/YTB-331) was built as Port Elizabeth (MC Hull 444), was laid down in early 1942, under a Maritime Commission contract as a type V2-ME-A1, by Calumet Shipyard and Dry Dock Co., Chicago, Illinois. Launched on 22 May 1942, sponsored by Mrs. James F. Rogan; she was renamed Namequa and classified as YT–331 on 29 September. The ship was acquired by the United States Navy on 15 October and placed in service on 17 February 1943.

The name "Namequa" comes from the only daughter of Black Hawk, leader of the Sauk and Fox tribes during the Black Hawk War (1831–1832).

== Service history ==
Allocated to the 1st Naval District and based at Boston, she provided fire-fighting, tug, and salvage services to naval vessels and installations in that district throughout her seven-year career. Reclassified YTB–331 on 15 May 1944, her active service was continuous, except for a period in reserve from March to October 1946. She was struck from the Naval Vessel Register in June 1950.

== See also ==
- Sotoyomo-class fleet tug
- Victory ships
- Liberty ship
- Type C1 ship
- Type C2 ship
- Type C3 ship
- United States Merchant Marine Academy
- List of auxiliaries of the United States Navy
