= Type V ship =

MARCOM tugboat class

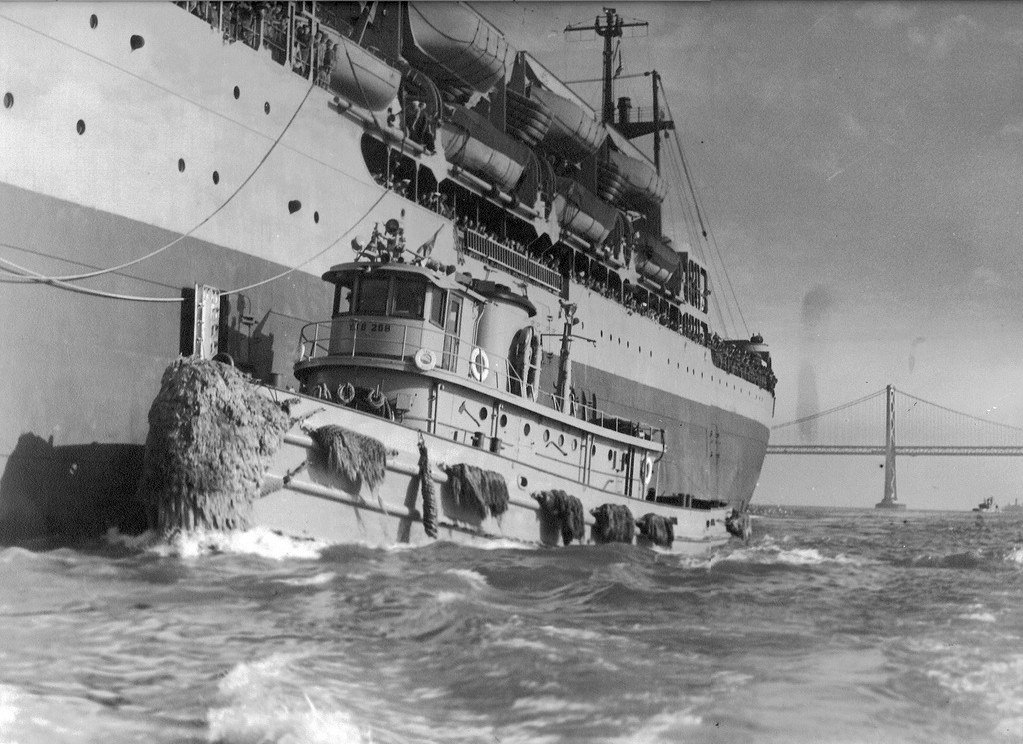
Red Cloud (foreground), a type V2-ME-A1, alongside USNS David C. Shanks, outside the Oakland Bay Bridge in San Francisco Bay, California, 1950s. On the bow is a tugboat fender, also call beards or bow pudding, which are rope padding to protect the bow.

The Type V ship is a United States Maritime Commission (MARCOM) designation for World War II tugboats. Type V was used in World War II, Korean War, and the Vietnam War. Type V ships were used to move ships and barges. Type V tugboats were made of either steel or wood hulls. There were four types of tugboats ordered for World War II. The largest type V design was the sea worthy 186-foot (57 m) long steel hull, V4-M-A1. The V4-M-A1 design was used by a number of manufacturers; a total of 49 were built. A smaller steel hull tugboat was the 94-foot (29 m) V2-ME-A1; 26 were built. The largest wooden hull was the 148-foot (45 m) V3-S-AH2, of which 14 were built. The smaller wooden hull was the 58-foot (18 m) V2-M-AL1, which 35 were built. Most V2-M-AL1 tugboats were sent to the United Kingdom for the war efforts under the lend-lease act. The Type V tugs served across the globe during World War II including: Pacific War, European theatre, and in the United States. SS Farallon, and other Type V tugs, were used to help built Normandy ports, including Mulberry harbour, on D-Day, 6 June 1944, and made nine round trips to Normandy to deliver Phoenix breakwaters.

Tugboats are used to maneuver vessels and barges by pushing or towing them. Tugs are needed to move vessels that either should not move by themselves, such as large ships in a crowded harbor or a narrow canal, or those that can not move by themselves, like as barges, disabled ships, or log rafts. Tugboats are powerful for their small size and are strongly built. Early tugboats used steam engines, but most have diesel engines now. Many tugboats have firefighting water cannons, allowing them to assist in firefighting, especially in harbors. Some minesweepers like USS Vireo, USS Lark and USS Kingfisher were converted to ocean tugs for the war.

== Ships in class ==
=== V2-ME-A1 ===
Named for small US ports. They had steel hulls, with a displacement of 325 long tons (330 t), 100 ft (30 m) long, with a beam of 25 ft (7.6 m), and a draft of 11.5 ft (3.5 m). Many had Enterprise or Alco diesel engines that ranged from 700 to 1,000 hp (520 to 750 kW) with electric drives. They were classified the Hiawatha-class tug in US Navy service, with an original designation of YT, "District Harbor Tug". On 15 May 1944, they were redesignated YTB, "District Harbor Tug, Large", before finally being designated YTM, "Harbor Tug, Medium", in February 1962. The 26 V2-ME-A1's were built by six different builders; Birchfield Shipbuilding & Boiler Co., Inc., Tacoma, Washington, 6 tugs; Canulette Shipbuilding, Slidell, Louisiana, 4 tugs; Calumet Shipyard & Drydock, Chicago, Illinois, 5 tugs; Ira. S. Bushey & Sons, Brooklyn, New York, 5 tugs; General Ship & Engine Works, East Boston, Massachusetts, 2 tugs; and Brunswick Marine Construction Corporation, Brunswick, Georgia, 4 tugs.

Construction data
Original name	Renamed	Hull no.	Builder	Launch Date	Delivery Date	Fate
Port Angeles	Hiawatha	YT-265	Birchfield Shipbuilding & Boiler Co., Inc., Tacoma, Washington	3 April 1942	30 November 1942	sold 1990 as Hiawatha, then Point San Pablo, Delta Lindsey, scrapped
Port Blakely	Pocahontas	YT-266	Birchfield Shipbuilding & Boiler Co., Inc., Tacoma, Washington	1 May 1942	31 December 1942	sold 1976, renamed Sea Lark, scrapped 2019
Port Discovery	Pogatacut	YT-267	Birchfield Shipbuilding & Boiler Co., Inc., Tacoma, Washington	3 April 1942	23 December 1942	sold private 1970, scrapped
Port Ludlow	Red Cloud	YT-268	Birchfield Shipbuilding & Boiler Co., Inc., Tacoma, Washington	2 May 1942	8 March 1943	scrapped 1987
Port Madison	Sakarissa	YT-269	Birchfield Shipbuilding & Boiler Co., Inc., Tacoma, Washington	14 July 1942	12 April 1943	to MARAD 1974, now at Amphibious Forces Memorial Museum
Port Orchard	Santanta	YT-270	Birchfield Shipbuilding & Boiler Co., Inc., Tacoma, Washington	14 July 1942	19 May 1943	sold private 1976, renamed Sea Fox, now Maris Pearl
Port Allen	YT-723	YT-723	Canulette Shipbuilding, Slidell, Louisiana	22 May 1942	20 March 1943	to MARCOM 1945, sold 1945 as Port Allen, later Ed Colle, scrapped
Port Barre			Canulette Shipbuilding, Slidell, Louisiana	22 May 1942	31 March 1943	sold 1946, as Standard No. 2, later Kamy Kay G, laid up and/or abandoned
Port Hudson	Wabaquasset	YTB-724	Canulette Shipbuilding, Slidell, Louisiana	17 June 1942	26 April 1943	acquired by US Navy 1945, never saw actual Naval service, then Crescent Towing as Port Hudson
Port Vincent			Canulette Shipbuilding, Slidell, Louisiana	22 July 1942	27 May 1943	sold 1946, as Standard No. 3, 1993, Port Vincent, 1996, Thunderbird
Port Byron	LT 113	LT 113	Calumet Shipyard, Chicago, Illinois	10 May 1942	11 September 1942	acquired by US Army 1942, renamed LT 113, sold 1946, renamed Dalzellaird, scrapped
Port Allegheny	LT 114	LT 114	Calumet Shipyard, Chicago, Illinois	12 May 1942	5 October 1942	acquired by US Army 1942, renamed LT 114, sold 1946, renamed Dyer, later Porpoise, Sachem, now Porpoise
Port Elizabeth	Namequa	YT-331	Calumet Shipyard, Chicago, Illinois	22 May 1942	15 October 1942	sold private 1950, scrapped
Port Conway	Nesutan	YT-338	Calumet Shipyard, Chicago, Illinois	16 June 1942	4 November 1942	sold to US Army 1950, as LT-1928, later George S., Jesse, now Victory
Port Fulton	LT 238	LT 238	Calumet Shipyard, Chicago, Illinois	1 July 1942	14 November 1942	sold 1946, as Frances K. McAllister, scrapped 1996
Port Chester	LT 233	LT 233	Ira. S. Bushey & Sons, Brooklyn, New York	10 September 1942	30 October 1942	sold 1946 as Capt Ed, later Peggy H, Signet Resolute, now Bluebird
Port Crane	Swatane	YT-344	Ira. S. Bushey & Sons, Brooklyn, New York	10 September 1942	25 November 1942	sold 1964, scrapped
Port Henry			Ira. S. Bushey & Sons, Brooklyn, New York	19 October 1942	19 February 1943	sold private 1945, renamed Captain Rodger, wrecked 1947
Port Jervis			Ira. S. Bushey & Sons, Brooklyn, New York	19 October 1942	27 January 1943	sold private, renamed Newport, Felicia, Terror, R. H. Tripp sank 2005 hurricane
Port Kent	Oratamin	YT-347	Ira. S. Bushey & Sons, Brooklyn, New York	19 August 1942	23 December 1942	sold 1969, scrapped
Port Clyde	LTC William R. Kendricks		General Ship & Engine Works, East Boston, Massachusetts	20 November 1941	18 February 1942	sold renamed, Resolute, scrapped
Port Huron	LTC Herbert L. Kidwell		General Ship & Engine Works, East Boston, Massachusetts	6 December 1941	18 February 1942	sold private as Port Huron, later Dalzelloch, Dalzellido, and Joan McAllister, scrapped
Port Wentworth	Haiglar	YT-327	Brunswick Marine Construction Corporation, Brunswick, Georgia	17 June 1942	14 November 1942	sold private 1947. Limon, Frank W. Barnes, Sandra, Sandra St. Philip, Tanda 12, Tug McGraw, scrapped
Port Clinton			Brunswick Marine Construction Corporation, Brunswick, Georgia	1 September 1942	23 January 1943	sold private 1945, Captain, Fred B. Dalzel, New Castle, Eliot Winslow, scrapped
Port Deposit	Mauvilla	YT-328	Brunswick Marine Construction Corporation, Brunswick, Georgia	1 August 1942	23 January 1943	sold private 1963, scrapped
Port Edwards			Brunswick Marine Construction Corporation, Brunswick, Georgia	17 October 1942	6 February 1943	sold private 1945, Hercules, Bear, scrapped

=== V4-M-A1 ===
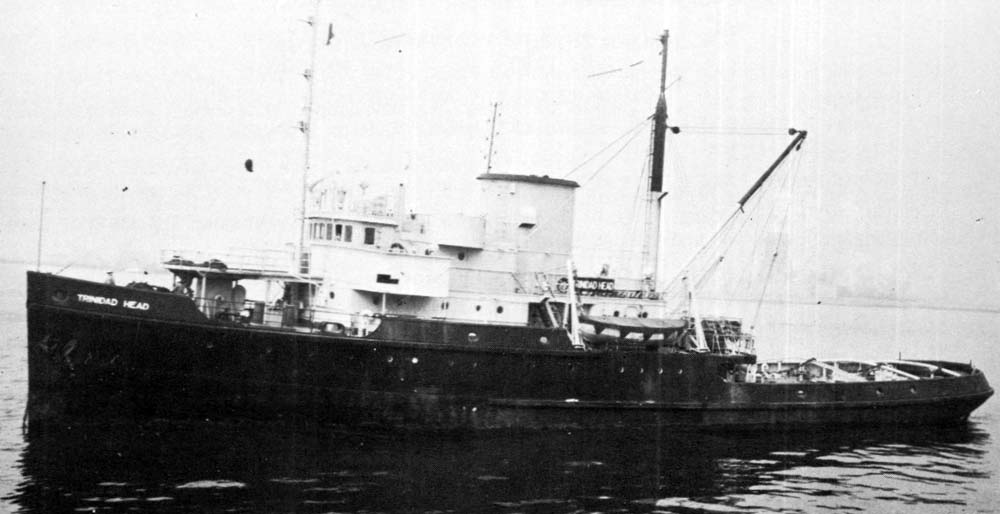
Trinidad Head, a V4-M-A1 tug, in New York July 1943

Named after lighthouses, the V4-M-A1's were the largest and most powerful tugs in the world when they were built in 1943. They had steel hulls, with a displacement of 1,613 long tons (1,639 t), 195 ft (59 m) long, with a beam of 37.5 ft (11.4 m), and a draft of 15.5 ft (4.7 m). The V4-M-A1 had a maximum speed of 14 kn (26 km/h; 16 mph). There were two engine manufacturers: National Supply Company, with 8–cylinder sets of 3,200 bhp (2,400 kW), and the Enterprise Engine & Trading Company, with 6–cylinders and 2,340 bhp (1,740 kW) power. The V4-M-A1's were operated by Moran Towing & Transportation, in New York, on behalf of the War Shipping Administration. Built by: Avondale Marine, in Westego, Louisiana, General Ships & Engine, in East Boston, Pennsylvania Shipyards, in Beaumont, Texas, Globe Shipbuilding, in Superior, Wisconsin, Froemming Brothers, in Milwaukee, Wisconsin, and Pendleton Shipbuilding, in New Orleans, Louisiana.

- Seguin, scrapped 1976
- Sand Key, scrapped 1977
- Sanibel Island, scrapped 1972
- Sabine Pass, helped with Normandy landings, Scrapped 1978
- Point Loma, scrapped 1972
- Anacapa, scrapped 1973
- Point Vicente, sold to Mexico, 1969, renamed Huitilopochtli (A 51)
- Point Arguello, scrapped 1973
- Matagorda, sank 1946
- Aransas Pass, scrapped 1973
- Sombrero Key, sold to Argentina, 1965, renamed Thompson, scrapped
- Dry Tortugas, sold to Argentina, 1965, renamed Goyena, scrapped
- Southwest Pass, scrapped 1973
- Montauk Point, sold to Mexico, 1969, renamed Quetzalcoatl (A 12)
- Moose Peak, helped with Normandy landings, sold to Mexico, 1969, sank 1974
- Boon Island, sank 1976
- Gay Head, helped with Normandy landings, scrapped 1977
- Bodie Island, helped with Normandy landings, scrapped 1973
- Great Isaac, helped with Normandy landings, sank 1947, collision with Norwegian freighter Bandeirante
- Tybee, scrapped 1978
- Point Sur, scrapped 1974
- Farallon, used to build Normandy port on D-Day, 6 June 1944, made 9 round trips to Normandy, sold to Mexico, 1969, scrapped 1978
- Point Cabrillo, scrapped 1974
- Trinidad Head, helped with Normandy landings, Scrapped 1969
- Scotch Cap, scrapped
- Watch Hill, scrapped 1973
- Wood Island, scrapped 1973
- Sands Point, scrapped 1982
- Point Judith, scrapped 1978
- Black Rock, helped with Normandy landings, Scrapped 1969
- Sankaty Head, helped with Normandy landings, Scrapped 1978
- Yaqina Head, sold private 1971, scrapped
- Bald Island, scrapped 1973
- Fire Island, scrapped 1972
- Libby Island, sold private 1971, scrapped
- St. Simon, scrapped 1977
- Petit Manan, scrapped 1976
- Burnt Island, sold too Mexico 1969, scrapped 1979
- Stratford Point, scrapped 1978
- Two Harbors, scrapped 1972
- White Shoal, sold private 1975, scrapped
- Cubits Gap, scrapped 1976
- Hillsboro Inlet, helped with Normandy landings, Scrapped 1977
- Jupiter Inlet, sold private 1971, scrapped
- Pigeon Point, sold too Mexico, 1969, scrapped 1970
- Point Arena, scrapped 1976
- Bayou St. John, scrapped 1977
- Mobile Point, sank 1944
- Race Point, scrapped 1972

=== V3-S-AH2 ===
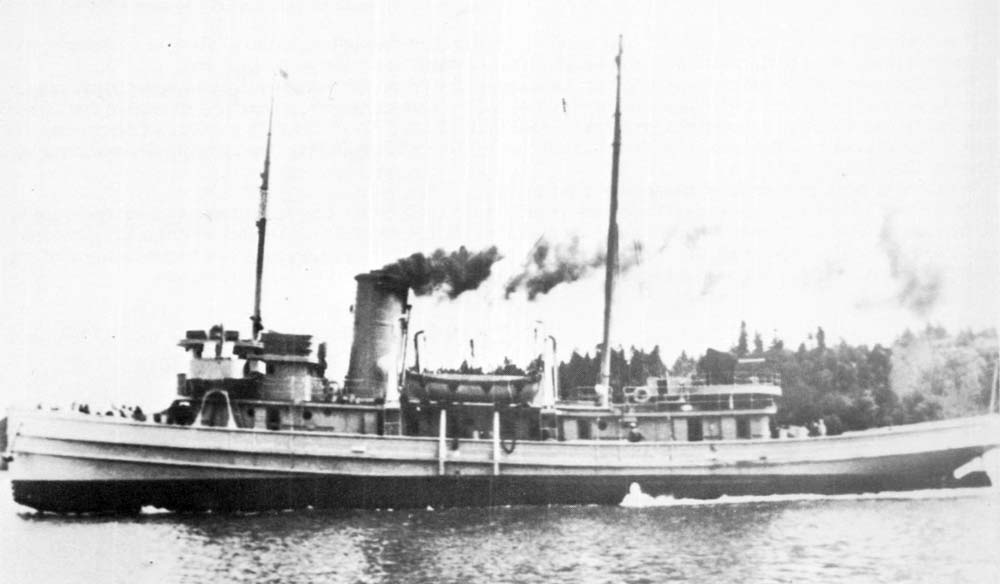
Compeller Tugboat on first on test runs, a type V3-S-AH2, built in 1944, by the Puget Sound Shipbuilding Company at Olympia, Washington, US Navy YN-14

Some were classed as YTB-"District Harbor Tug Large". A Douglas fir wood hull ship with a displacement of 1,220 long tons (1,240 t), 157 ft (48 m) long, with a beam of 32 ft (9.8 m), and a draft of 15 ft (4.6 m). They had triple-expansion reciprocating engines producing 1,000 hp (750 kW). They were capable of 10 kn (19 km/h; 12 mph) without a tow and about 6 kn (11 km/h; 6.9 mph) with a tow. They had a range of 1,500 mi (2,400 km). The V3-S-AH2's were manned by a crew of 27. They were built by Corpus Christi Shipyard, Corpus Christi, Texas, Puget Sound SB Company, Olympia, Washington, Standard Shipbuilding Company, San Pedro, California, and Astoria Shipbuilding, Astoria, Oregon.

- Sustainer, intended for the United Kingdom, as Atworth but sold to USSR
- Compeller, sold to the United Kingdom, renamed Atherida, sold private 1948, scrapped
- Dexterous, sold to the United Kingdom, renamed Athelney, sold to Trinidad, 1945, to Caymans, 1948, scrapped 1951
- Mighty, sold to the United Kingdom, renamed Atil, sold private 1948, scrapped
- Secure, sold to the United Kingdom, renamed Attigny, sold private 1948, scrapped 1955
- Forthright, sold to the United Kingdom, renamed Attock, to USN renamed YTB 610, to USSR 1944 renamed Forthright
- Power, sold to the United Kingdom, renamed Atengo, sold to Italy, 1947 renamed Titano, scrapped 1974
- Steadfast, sold to the United Kingdom, renamed Atako, wrecked and lost, 1944
- Durable, sold to the United Kingdom, renamed Ataran, to Italy, 1947, renamed Ciclope, scrapped
- Spirited, sold to the United Kingdom, renamed Atolia, to Trinidad, 1948, to Caymans 1951, scrapped
- Helper, sold to the United Kingdom, renamed Atoyac, to Italy, 1949, renamed Nereo
- Resister, sold to the United Kingdom, renamed Atiamuri, sold to Italy, 1947, sold to Israel, 1954
- Superb, sold to the United Kingdom, renamed Atwood, sold to Trinidad, 1948, sold to Caymans, 1951, scrapped
- Robust, sold to the United Kingdom, renamed Atmore, sold private, 1948, scrapped

=== V2-M-AL1 ===
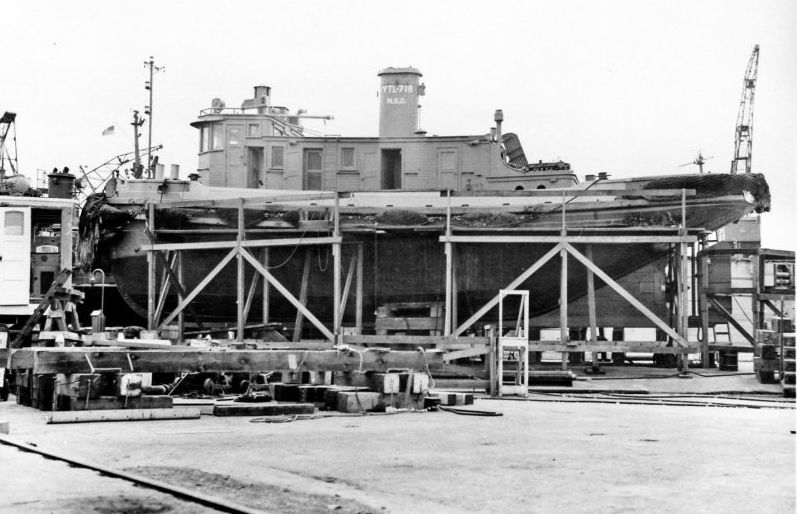
YTL-718, a V2-M-AL1, on the quay wall at Navy Yard Mare Island, 8 November 1945

Port Sewall class tug. Named for American ports. All but one tug went for Lend-Lease use, some serviced in the Mediterranean Sea in WW2. V2-M-AL1 were: Wood hull, 90 tons, beam 19 foot, diesel engine with 240 horsepower, fuel Oil: 1920 gallons. Built by Puget Sound SB, Standard SB, Steinbach IW, Eureka Shipbuilding, Arlington SB, Texas SB, Siletz BW, Blair Company, Marinette Marine and Texas SB.

- Port Sewall To the United Kingdom as a "TUSA" Tug, USA. (YN 1563)
- Port Kennedy To the United Kingdom as a "TUSA" YN 1564
- Port Reading To the United Kingdom as a "TUSA" YN 1565
- Port Costa To the United Kingdom as a "TUSA" YN 1
- Port San Luis To the United Kingdom as a "TUSA" YN 2
- Port Chicago To the United Kingdom as a "TUSA" YN 3
- Port Gamble To the United Kingdom as a "TUSA" YN 4
- Port Tobacco To the United Kingdom as a "TUSA" YN 5
- Port Haywood To US Navy renamed YTL 718, sold private 1947 renamed Limpiar. (YTL= District Harbor Tug Small)
- Port Inglis To the United Kingdom as a "TUSA"
- Port Mayaca To the United Kingdom as a "TUSA"
- Port Orange To the United Kingdom as a "TUSA"
- Port Richey To the United Kingdom as a "TUSA"
- Port St. Joe To the United Kingdom as a "TUSA"
- Port Tampa City To the United Kingdom as a "TUSA"
- Port Arthur To the United Kingdom as a "TUSA"
- Port Bolivar To the United Kingdom as a "TUSA"
- Port Lavaca To the United Kingdom as a "TUSA"
- Port Neches To the United Kingdom as a "TUSA"
- Port O'Connor To the United Kingdom as a "TUSA"
- Port Sullivan To the United Kingdom as a "TUSA"
- Port Stanley To the United Kingdom as a "TUSA"
- Port Townsend To the United Kingdom as a "TUSA"
- Port Ewen To the United Kingdom as a "TUSA"
- Port Gibson To the United Kingdom as a "TUSA"
- Port Jefferson To the United Kingdom as a "TUSA"
- Port Leyden To the United Kingdom as a "TUSA"
- Port Austin To the United Kingdom as a "TUSA"
- Port Homer To the United Kingdom as a "TUSA"
- Port Hope To the United Kingdom as a "TUSA"
- Port Sanilac To the United Kingdom as a "TUSA"
- Port William To the United Kingdom as a "TUSA"
- Port Wing To the United Kingdom as a "TUSA"
- Port Sulphur To the United Kingdom as a "TUSA"
- Port Treverton To the United Kingdom as a "TUSA"

== ATR-1-class rescue tug ==
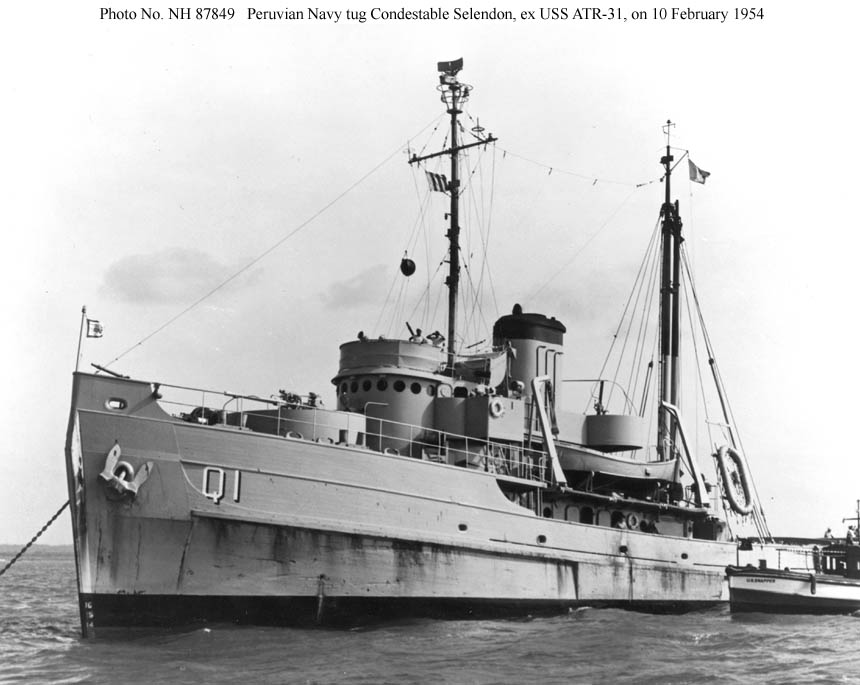
USS ATR-31

ATR-1 class - Auxiliary Tug Rescue was a wooden-hulled rescue tug that was built by Wheeler SB, Northwest Shipbuilding, Frank L. Sample, Jakobson Shipyard, Camden SB, Lynch SB, and Fulton Shipyard in 1944 and 1945. The 89 ATR-1-class tugs serve during World War II in both Asiatic-Pacific Theater and the European theatre of World War II. 40 of ATR-1 class had a displacement of 852 tons light and 1,315 tons fully loaded. They had a length of 165 feet 6 inches (50.44 m), a beam of 33 feet 4 inches (10.16 m) and draft of 15 feet 6 inches (4.72 m). Top speed of 12.2 knots (22.6 km/h; 14.0 mph). The largest boom had a capacity of 4 tons. They were armed with one 3-inch/50-caliber gun and two single Oerlikon 20 mm cannon. The crew complement was five officers and 47 enlisted men. They had a fuel capacity of 1,620 bbl (258 m^{3}). The propulsion was one Fulton Iron Works vertical triple-expansion reciprocating steam engine with two Babcock and Wilcox "D"-type boilers with a single propeller creating 1,600 shp (1,200 kW). They had two turbo drive Ships Service Generators, rated at 60 kW 120 V D.C. Example is USS ATR-31.

== Cherokee-class tugboat ==
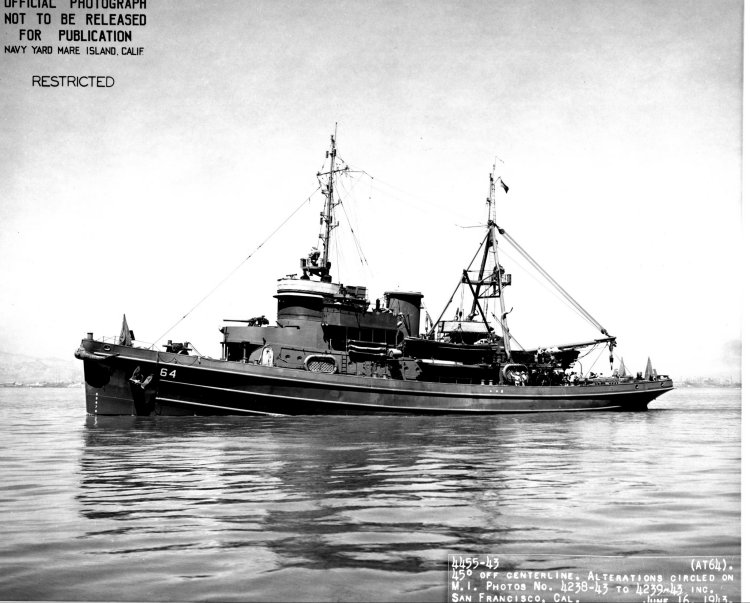
USS Navajo

The Cherokee class of fleet tugboats, originally known as the Navajo class, were built for the US Navy for World War II with a displacement of 1,235 long tons (1,255 t). They had a length of 205 ft (62 m), a beam of 38 ft 6 in (11.73 m), a draft of 18 ft (5.5 m). Their propulsion was composed of a diesel-electric engine with one shaft creating 3,600 hp (2,700 kW) and a top speed of 16.5 knots (30.6 km/h; 19.0 mph). They were give the hull classification symbol of "AT" for "Auxiliary Tug". The tugs were built by Bethlehem Mariners Harbor, Staten Island, Charleston Shipbuilding and Drydock Company, and United Engineering Co. Example: USS Navajo.

== Abnaki-class tugboat ==
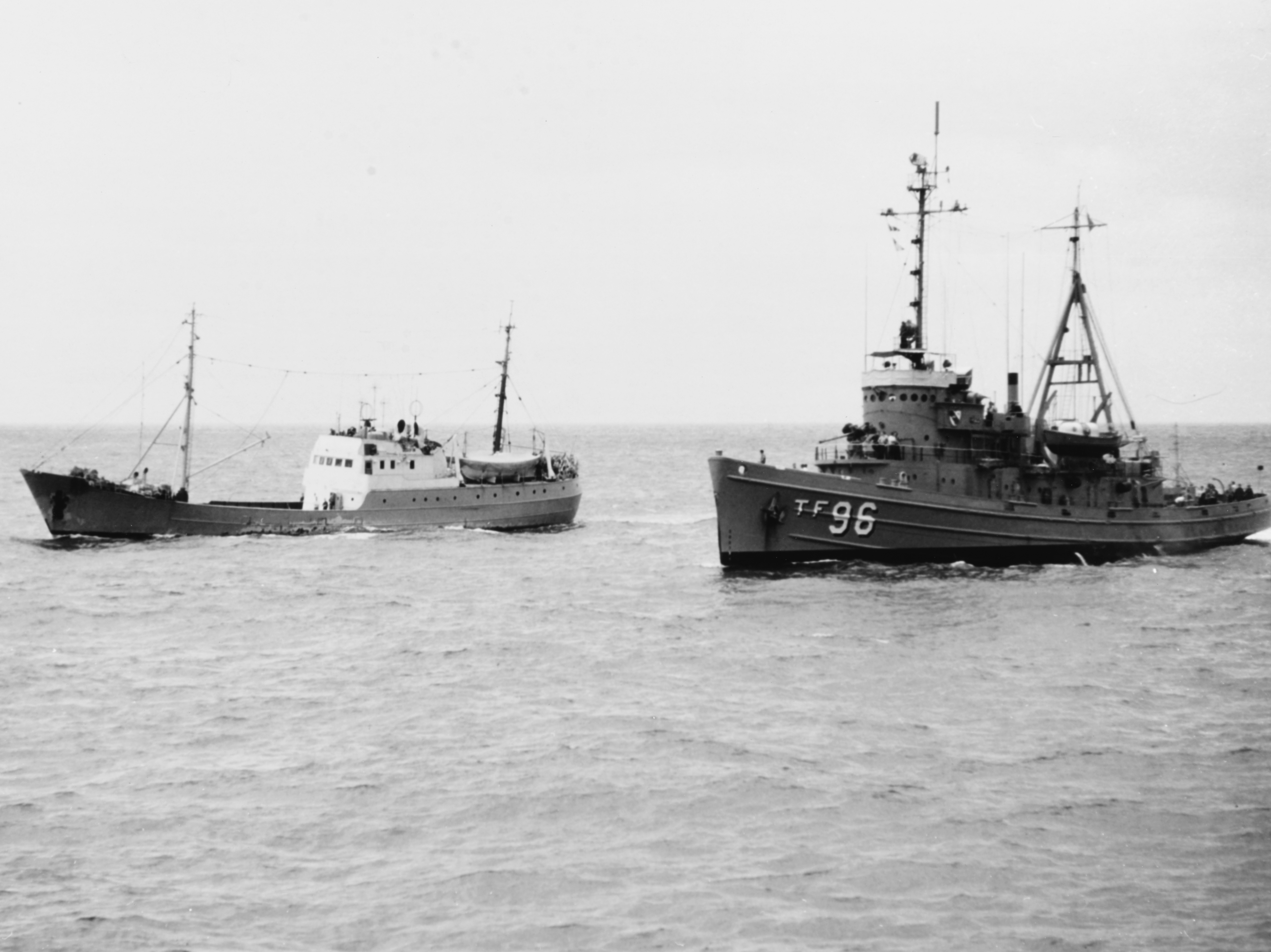
US Abnaki-96 (ATF-96)

Abnaki-class tugboat were ocean fleet tugboats that were built for the US Navy for World War II with a displacement of 1,589 tons, a length of 205 ft 0 in (62.48 m), a beam of 38 ft 6 in (11.73 m), and a draft of 15 ft 4 in (4.67 m). They had a propulsion of: 4 × General Motors 12-278A diesel main engines, 4 × General Electric generators, 3 × General Motors 3-268A auxiliary services engines, with a single screw of 3,600 shp (2,700 kW) and a top speed: 16.5 knots. Class ATF for Auxiliary Tug Fleet. Built by Charleston Shipbuilding & Drydock. Example: USS Abnaki (ATF-96).

== Sotoyomo-class tugboat ==
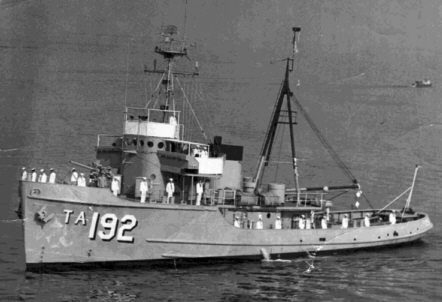
Sotoyomo-class tugboat

Sotoyomo-class tugboat were tugboats that were built for the US Navy for World War II with a displacement of 534 long tons (543 t) light, 835 long tons (848 t) full, a length of 143 ft (44 m), a beam of 33 ft (10 m) and a draft of 13 ft (4.0 m). They had a propulsion of diesel-electric engine with a single screw and a top speed of 13 knots. Harbor tugs (YT) were named after American Indian tribes: Example tug is the USS Ontario (AT-13)

== Cahto-class district harbor tug ==
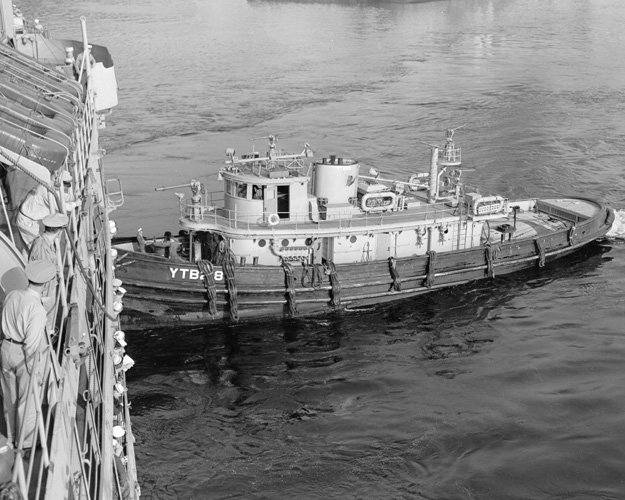
Cahto-class district harbor tug

Cahto-class district harbor tug was a harbour tug of the US Navy with a displacement of 410 long tons (417 t), a length of 110 ft 0 in (33.53 m), a beam of 27 ft 0 in (8.23 m) and a draft of 11 ft 4 in (3.45 m). They had a propulsion of diesel-electric engine with a single screw and a top speed of 12 knots. A crew of 12. Sample tug: USS Cahto (YTB-215). Built by Kneass Boat Works, Anderson & Cristofani, Puget Sound Naval Shipyard, Norfolk Naval Shipyard, Consolidated Shipbuilding Corp., Defoe Shipbuilding Company, Gulfport Shipbuilding Corporation, Gibbs Gas Engine, Bushey & Sons Shipyard, W. A. Robinson, Greenport Basin, Mathis, Elizabeth City, Stone Boat Yard, Martinac, Ira Bushey, Luders Marine, Westergard, Everett-Pacific, United States Coast Guard Yard, Commercial Iron Works and Bethlehem Shipbuilding San Pedro.

=== Hisada class harbor tug ===
Hisada class harbor tug is a subclass of Cahto-class district harbor tug. Hisada class harbor had the same design as the 260-ton Cahto-class district harbor tug. Harbor tugs (YT) were named after American Indian tribes. Example tugs: USS Nabigwon (YTB-521) and USS Wabanquot (YTB-525).

=== Woban Class District Harbor Tug ===
Woban Class District Harbor Tug is a subclass of Cahto-class district harbor tug. Hisada class harbor had the same design as the 260-ton Cahto-class district harbor tug. Harbor tugs (YT) were named after American Indian tribes. Built by Pacific Coast Engineering, Puget Sound Navy Yard, and Consolidated Shipbuilding Corporation. Example tugs: Hoga (YT-146) and USS Nokomis (YT-142).

== US Army ==
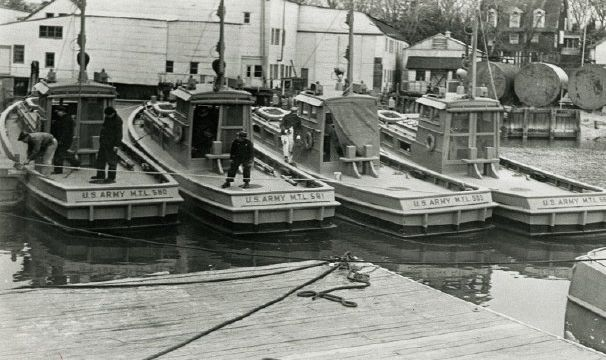
US Army Motor Towing Launch (MTL) Tugs in 1944

For World War 2 the US Army had tugboats built to move cargo barges in harbors. The Army often called the tug a Sea Mule, used to move US Army barges. Astoria Marine Construction Company built 15 MTL.

- Small wood US Army MTL Harbor Tugboats, 14 model 324-A with a length of 47 feet, a beam of 12 feet. MTL is for Motor Towing Launch. The Army had built 1,251 marine tractors (MT) and marine tow launches (MTL) by 41 boatbuilders. MT tugs were either 26 feet or 36 feet (Design 329) in length and the MTL were 46 feet.
- US Army TP Harbor Tug with displacement 185 tons gross, a length of 96 feet, a beam 25 feet, a draft of 11 feet, Power one Fairbanks–Morse six cylinder diesel engine to a single propeller with 450 shp. The TP is for "Tug/Passenger". The US Army had 43 of this 96-foot tugs built for World War 2, Ackerman Boat Company` built 15 of them.
- US Army had built 170 of the 65-foot, diesel-powered, passenger / cargo boats. These could also be used as harbor tugs. These were known as tug-transports, or T-boats.
- ST Small Harbor Tug, with steel hull, length of 81 ft (25 m), a beam of 23 ft (7.0 m) and depth of 10 ft (3.0 m).. There were 186 built by Decatur Iron and Steel in Decatur, Alabama, American Machy in Beresford, Florida, Birchfield Boiler in Tacoma, Washington, Equitable Equipment in New Orleans, Smith, C. W. in Pensacola, Florida, Port Houston IW in Houston, Reliable Welding in Olympia, Washington, Tampa Marine in Tampa, Florida and Consolidated SB in Brooklyn NY. Use for port duties. Most were a 327 design from ST-672 to ST-782. ST-695 tug museum ship at Los Angeles Maritime Museum
- RT tugs for River Tugs. Many were built by small shipyards builders for the U.S. Army. The RT tugs were built of steel or wood, or both. They were built with differt designs and length ranging from 39 ft (12 m) to 160 ft (49 m). RT-804 to 813; RT-804 to 813 and RT-899 to RT-903.

== Bagaduce-class tugboat WW1 ==
Bagaduce-class tugboat were World War 1 tug boats used in World War 1 and World War 2. During World War 1 these were called YMT-Yard Motor Tug. Engineered with a displacement of 1,000 long tons (1,016 t) (normal) and a length of 156 ft 8 in (47.75 m), a beam of 30 ft (9.1 m) and a draft of 14 ft 7 in (4.45 m), with a top speed of 12.4 knots. USS Example USS Sagamore (AT-20).

== Arapaho-class fleet tug WW1 ==
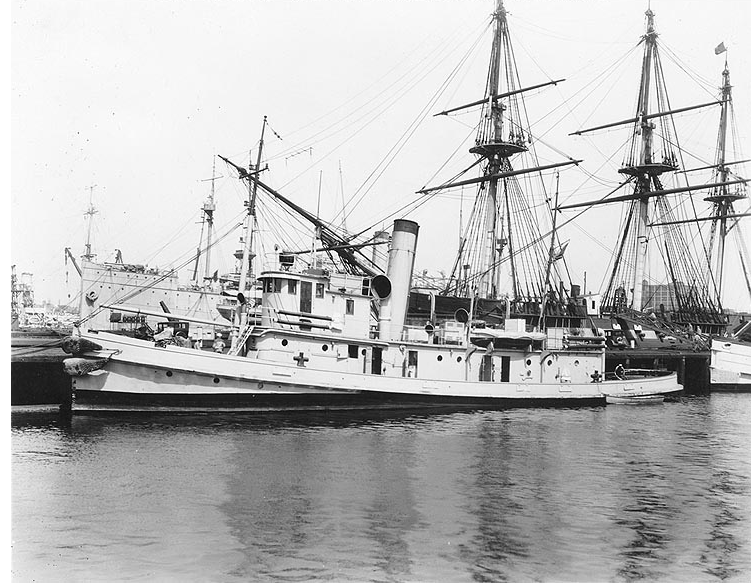
Arapaho-class fleet tug

Arapaho-class fleet tug were World War 1 tug boats used in World War 1 and World War 2. Engineered with a displacement of 575 tons and a length of 122 ft 6 in (37.34 m), a beam of 24 ft (7.3 m) and a draft of 12 ft 10 in (3.91 m), with a top speed of 11 knots. Ships in class:

- AT-14 Arapaho later renamed: YT-121 in 1936 then sold in 1937, renamed Evridiki in 1960, sold and renamed Faneromini in 1968. Scrapped in 1986.
- USS Mohave (AT-15) Wrecked in 1928.
- AT-16 Tillamook later renamed YT-122 in 1936, renamed YTM-122 in 1944. Scrapped in 1947

== Canada Tugs ==
SS Rockdoe Canada tug, renamed Hoedic in 1947

Modified Ocean Warrior-class Tugs built by Kingston Ship Builder in Kingston ON. GT of 233 tons, 105 feet long, Beam of 26.2' and Draft of 12.5' with 1000HP, max of 14 knots, Steel hull, built between 1945 and 1946.

- Rockglen
- Rockforest
- Rockpigeon
- Rockdoe
- Rockswift
- Rockelm
- Rockswift
- Rockwing
- Rockcliffe
- Rockmount
- Rockport
- Rockland
- Rockhill
- Rockwood
- Rockruby
- Rockhawk
- Rockthrush
- Rockcrystal

== Notable incidents ==
- Sonoma tug sank off Dio Island in action at San Pedro Bay, Leyte Gulf, Philippines when an enemy bomber crashed into her on 24 October 1944.
- USS Partridge (AM-16) a Minesweeper, converted to a tug, Ocean Tug AT-138, sank after a torpedo from a German E-Boat hit on 11 June 1944. She sank on way to France at 49°30′N 00°50′W, about 11 nmi (13 mi; 20 km) north of Vierville-sur-Mer.
- Matagorda a V4-M-A1 tug, sank in 1946.
- Boon Island a V4-M-A1 tug, sank in 1976.
- Moose Peak a V4-M-A1 tug, sank in 1974. She was a Merchant Marine Ship at Normandy.
- Great Isaac a V4-M-A1 tug, sank in 1947.
- MV 'Mobile Point' a V4-M-A1 tug sank on 23 December 1944 after collided with the SS Beaton Park, a British cargo ship off the coast of Oregon, near the Nestucca Bay National Wildlife Refuge.
- YTL-566 sank on the way to Vietnam in the vicinity of Côn Sơn Island, during the Vietnam War.
- YTL-199 sank in 1946.
- Triton (YT-10) fleet tug, sank with all the crew on 30 December 1962 in storm off Huntington, Long Island, New York.
- USS Pokagon (YT-274) sank near Green Cove Springs, Fla. after she capsized on 27 September 1947.
- USS Shahaka (YTB-368) sank after colliding with USS ABSD-2, a floating drydock, midway between the California coast and the Hawaiian Islands at 27° 21'N 136° 29'W in June 1944.
- USS Secota (YTM-415), Sank in collision with submarine, USS Georgia (SSGN-729) on 22 March 1986 near Midway Atoll.
- YT-198 sank after hitting a mine off the Anzio beachhead on 18 February 1944.
- USS Iona (YTB-220) sank after a fire in June 1963.
- ATA-214 Palo Blanco renamed Radnik sank in storm off Syria in 1953.
- ATR-64 renamed La Lumiere sank at mooring in 2008 in Britannia Beach BC.
- AT-171 sank after a collision off the Azores in 1944.Wrecked off Okinawa 9 Oct. 1945
- USS Mohave (AT-15) ran aground and was wrecked on 13 February 1928 in Massachusetts Bay.
- USS Arapaho (ATF-68) as ARA Comandante General Zapiola in the Argentine Navy ran aground on a reef off Antarctica and sank on 10 January 1976.
- ATF-117 USS Wateree was wrecked and sank off Okinawa on 9 Oct. 1945.
- USS Grebe was wrecked and sank off Fiji on 9 October 1945 with a loss of eight of crew.
- AT-200 Sold and renamed Leucolon (PP 61) was wrecked and sank in 1965.
- ATR-15 was wrecked and sank off Normandy on 19 June 1944.
- AT-31 USS Koka was wrecked and sank in 1938 off San Clemente Island.
- AT-166 Chetco sold and renamed Neptune sank after collision in 1948
- AT-191 sunk by typhoon Louise at Okinawa on 9 Oct. 1945.
- AT-210 USS Catawba renamed ARA Comodoro Somellera (A10)sank in 1998.

== See also ==
- Type B ship
- Sotoyomo-class fleet tug
- Pusher tug
- Victory ships
- Liberty ship
- Type C1 ship
- Type C2 ship
- Type C3 ship
- United States Merchant Marine Academy
- List of auxiliaries of the United States Navy
- Wooden boats of World War 2

== Bibliography ==
- "V-type ships". shipbuildinghistory.com. 8 April 2010.
- "Yard Tugs (YT, YTB, YTM, YTL) Built or Acquired During WWII". shipbuildinghistory.com. 7 May 2011.
- Martin, Robert E. (March 1930). "How Pygmy Tugboats Dock a Giant Liner". Popular Science Monthly. pp. 22–23.
- Van Der Ster, Hans. "Directory of The Ocean Going Tugs type V2-ME-A1" (PDF). Archived from the original (PDF) on February 17, 2013.
- "Miscellaneus U.S. Maritime Commission Ships Part 2". 5 June 2000.
- Priolo, Gary P. (7 May 2010). "Hiawatha (YTM-265)". NavSource.
- Priolo, Gary P. (30 March 2018). "Pocahontas (YTM-266)". NavSource.
- Priolo, Gary P. (21 February 2020). "Pogatacut (YTM-267)". NavSource.
- Priolo, Gary P. (17 February 2012). "Red Cloud (YTM-268)". NavSource.
- Priolo, Gary P. (16 March 2012b). "Sakarissa (YTM-269)". NavSource.
- Priolo, Gary P. (17 July 2015). "Santanta (YTM-270)". NavSource.
- "photo V2-ME-A1, Port Orchard, Santanta (YT 270), Maris Pearl". retiredtugs.org. Archived from the original on April 25, 2012.
- Priolo, Gary P. (7 May 2010b). "YTB-723". NavSource.
- Priolo, Gary P. (14 July 2022). "Wabaquasset (YTB-724)". NavSource.
- Priolo, Gary P. (25 September 2020b). "LT-113". NavSource.
- Priolo, Gary P. (25 September 2020c). "LT-114". NavSource.
- Priolo, Gary P. (7 May 2010c). "Namequa (YTB-331)". NavSource.
- Priolo, Gary P. (25 September 2020d). "Nesutan (YT 338)". NavSource.
- Priolo, Gary P. (18 September 2020e). "LT-233". NavSource.
- Priolo, Gary P. (7 May 2010d). "Swatane (YT-344)". NavSource.
- Priolo, Gary P. (20 December 2019). "Oratamin (YT-347)". NavSource.
- Priolo, Gary P. (14 August 2020f). "LT. Col. William R. Kendricks". NavSource.
- Priolo, Gary P. (24 July 2020g). "LT. COL. Herbert L. Kidwell". NavSource.
- Priolo, Gary P. (7 May 2010e). "Haiglar (YT-327)". NavSource.
- Priolo, Gary P. (2 April 2010f). "Mauvilla (YT-328)". NavSource.
