= USS Hiawatha (YT-265) =

Tugboat of the United States Navy

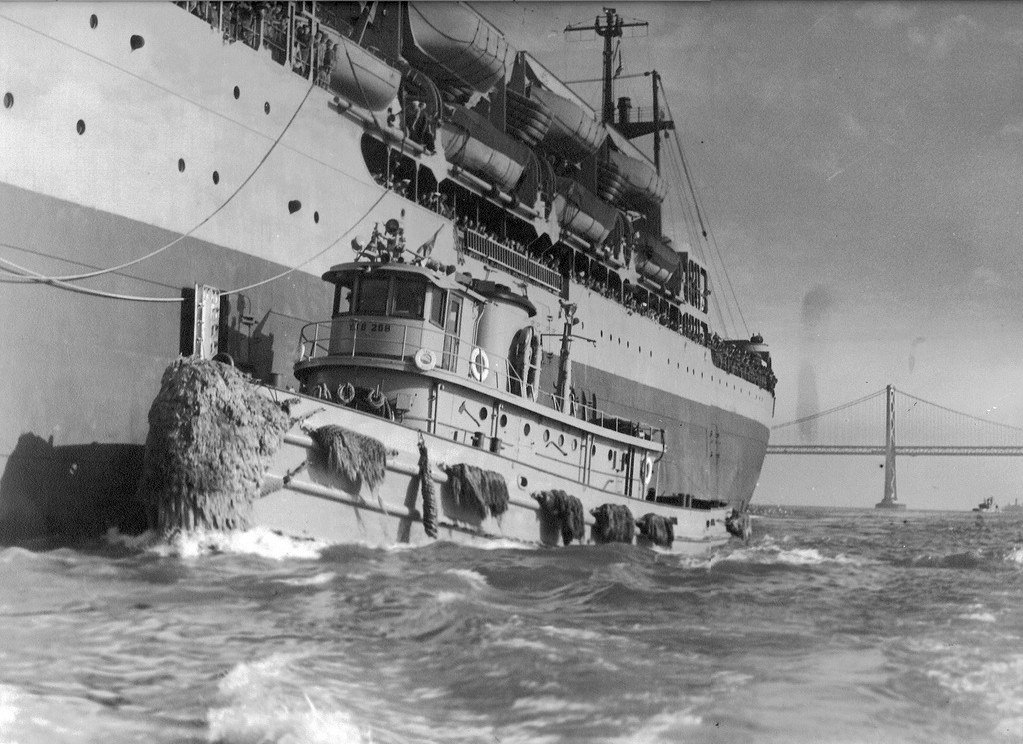
- Red Cloud (YTB-268), a type V2-ME-A1, same as Hiawatha, alongside David C. Shanks, outside the Oakland Bay Bridge in San Francisco Bay, California, 1950s

History

United States
- Name: Port Angeles
- Namesake: Port Angeles
- Owner: Maritime Commission
- Ordered: as type (V2-ME-A1) hull, MCE hull 432
- Awarded: 23 August 1941
- Builder: Birchfield Boiler, Inc., Tacoma, Washington
- Cost: $301,042
- Yard number: 1
- Laid down: 27 October 1941
- Launched: 3 April 1942
- Sponsored by: Mrs. Violet Davies
- Fate: Transferred to the US Navy, 30 April 1942

United States
- Name: Hiawatha
- Namesake: Hiawatha
- Owner: US Navy
- Acquired: 30 April 1942
- Reclassified: From harbor tug (YT-265) to large harbor tug (YTB-265) 15 May 1944; To medium harbor tug (YTM-265) February 1962
- Identification: Hull symbol: YT-265; YTB-265 (15 May 1944); YTM-265 (February 1962); Callsign: NYHV
- Fate: Sold for scrapping, 7 April 1987

General characteristics
- Class & type: Hiawatha-class tugboat
- Type: Harbor tug
- Displacement: 237 long tons (241 t)
- Length: 100 ft (30 m)
- Beam: 25 ft (7.6 m)
- Draft: 9 ft 7 in (2.92 m)
- Installed power: Enterprise DMQ-8 Diesel engine; 700 shp (520 kW)
- Propulsion: Single propeller
- Speed: 16 kn (30 km/h; 18 mph)
- Crew: 14
- Armament: 2 × 0.50 in (12.70 mm) heavy machine guns

USS Hiawatha (YT-265), later YTB-265, later YTM-265, was a type V2-ME-A1 harbor tug that entered service in the United States Navy in 1942, and was sold in 1987. She was the third ship to bear the name Hiawatha.

== Construction ==
Hiawatha was laid down as the tug Port Angeles, under a Maritime Commission (MARCOM) contract, MC hull 432, by Birchfield Boiler, Inc. at Tacoma, Washington, on 27 October 1941. She was launched on 3 April 1942, sponsored by Mrs. Violet Davies. The U.S. Navy acquired Port Angeles on 30 April 1942, renaming her Hiawatha, and placed her in service as harbor tug Hiawatha (YT-265).

== Service history ==
Because of a delay in the delivery of the engine, the supercharger was not installed and delivery was delayed until 30 November 1942. Hiawatha performed harbor tug duties for the 13th Naval District, at Seattle, Washington, during and after World War II. She was reclassified as a large harbor tug, and redesignated YTB-265, on 15 May 1944.

In 1948, Hiawatha was assigned to the 12th Naval District, where she operated as a tug for the San Francisco Naval Shipyard, at San Francisco, California, into at least the 1960s. She was reclassified as a medium harbor tug, and redesignated YTM-265, in February 1962.

Hiawatha was sold for scrapping on 7 April 1987.

== Bibliography ==
- "Port Angeles".
- "Hiawatha (YTM-265)". NavSource. 7 May 2010.
- "Hiawatha III (YT-265)". Dictionary of American Naval Fighting Ships. Naval History and Heritage Command. 16 July 2015. This article incorporates text from this source, which is in the public domain.
