= USC&GS Yukon (1898) =

Former US Coast Guard & Geodetic Survey steamer

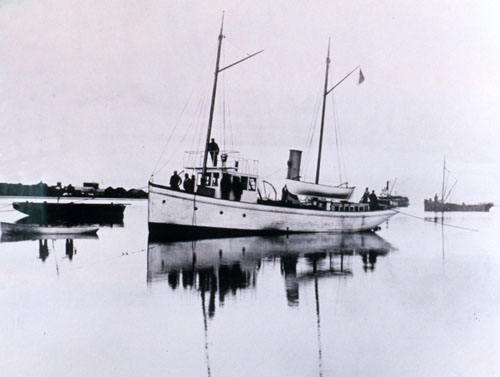
- Yukon in Alaskan waters

History

United States
- Name: Yukon
- Awarded: April 9, 1898
- Builder: Gas Engine & Power Co. and Charles L. Seabury Co., Morris Heights, Bronx, New York
- Cost: $10,926.40 USD
- Launched: August 20, 1898 at St. Michael, Alaska after being shipped in components by way of Seattle from New York.
- Completed: 1898
- Commissioned: 1898
- Decommissioned: 1923

General characteristics
- Type: Survey ship
- Length: 75 ft (23 m)
- Beam: 15 ft 7 in (4.75 m)
- Draft: 5 ft (1.5 m)
- Propulsion: Steam engine and sail

USC&GS Yukon was a steamer that served as a survey ship in the United States Coast and Geodetic Survey from 1898 to 1923. She was the second and last Coast and Geodetic Survey ship to bear the name.

== Construction and characteristics ==
Yukon was built under a contract let 9 April 1898 to Gas Engine & Power Company and Charles L. Seabury Company, Morris Heights, Bronx, New York, for building the ship in components suitable for shipping under the supervision of Assistant J. F. Pratt. The components were shipped by rail to Seattle, Washington, and then to St. Michael, Territory of Alaska, arriving there on 3 July 1898. A survey team under Assistant Pratt had been waiting at St. Michael for her to arrive since 29 June 1898, and on 11 July 1898 enough material was on shore for them to begin laying Yukon′s keel. Approximately twenty men assembled her. Work on Yukon was delayed when the assembly team was diverted to make repairs to the Coast and Geodetic Survey survey steamer USC&GS Taku, which had arrived at St. Michael in a "disabled condition," but Yukon nonetheless was completed and launched on 20 August 1898, only 41 days after her keel had been laid and after only 29 days of actual work to assemble her. Yukon was commissioned immediately.

== Service history ==
With all equipment and stores loaded aboard Yulon by 23 August 1898, "at 2:15 a.m. she started for the mouth of the Kwiklok (Note: One of the outlets in the Yukon delta, now spelled Kwikluak (Geographic dictionary of Alaska)) by way of the Aproon Mouth" for surveys. From the Aproon Mouth she towed a scow with the survey party's camping outfit to the Kwiklok, where she arrived 26 August 1898. After a brief stay on the survey grounds all vessels, including Yukon, headed to St. Michael on 10 September 1898 for winter storage. After arrival on 13 September 1898, Yukon, Taku, two steam launches, the scow, and eight "pulling boats" were housed for the winter. The survey party embarked on the United States Navy gunboat USS Wheeling for transportation to Seattle.

In the summer of 1912, Yukon rendered assistance to the inhabitants of Kodiak on Kodiak Island following an eruption of Mount Katmai. Tragedy struck her in November 1916 when a member of her crew, watchman F. A. Paul, was lost by probable drowning at King Cove on the Alaska Peninsula.

After serving exclusively in Alaskan waters, Yukon was retired from Coast and Geodetic Survey service in 1923.
