= Beemster-class minesweeper =

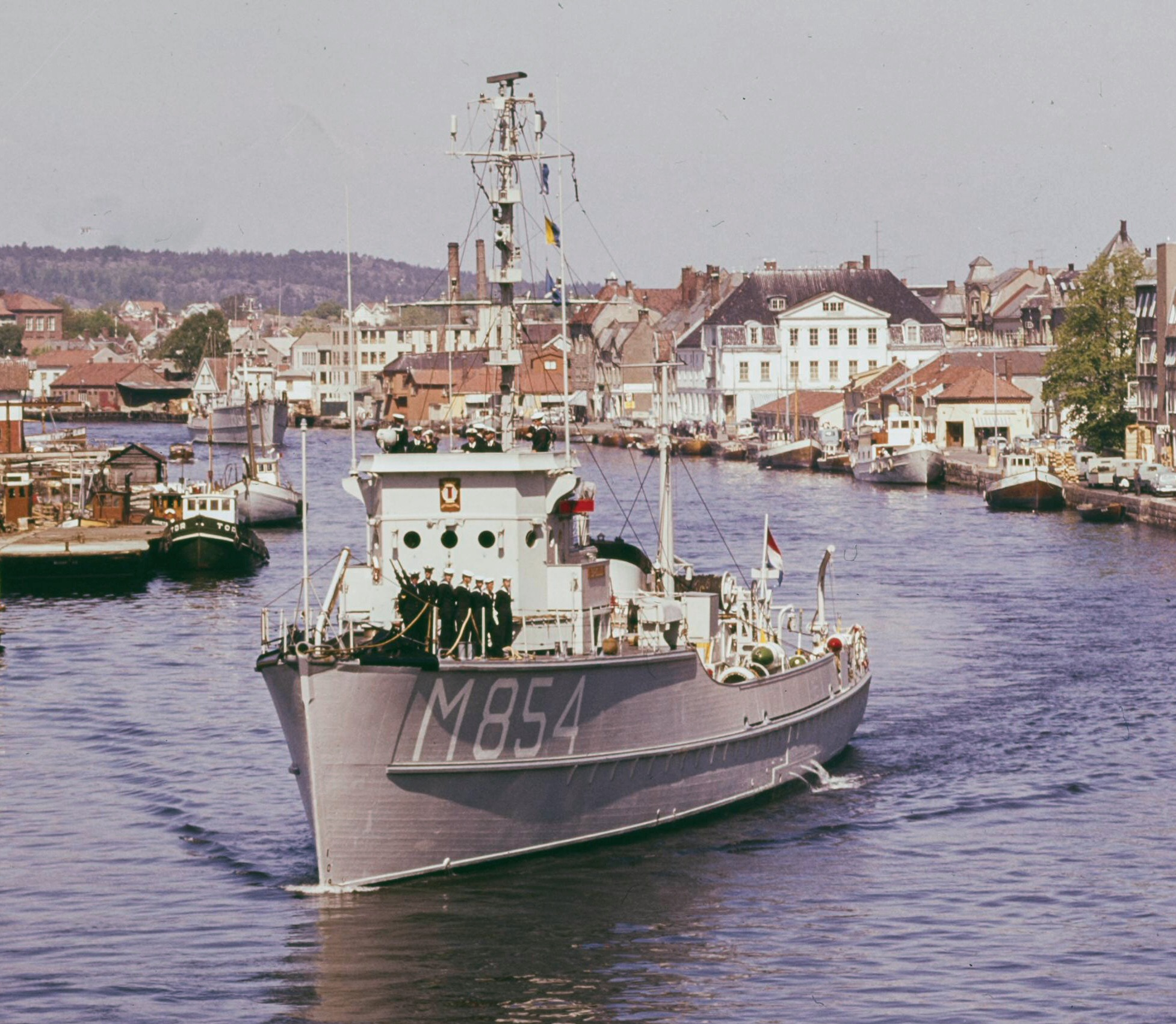
- HNLMS Brielle in Fredrikstad in 1964

Class overview
- Name: Beemster class
- Operators: Royal Netherlands Navy
- Built: 1951-1954
- In commission: 1953-1976
- Planned: 14
- Completed: 14

General characteristics
- Type: Minesweeper
- Displacement: 384 t (378 long tons)
- Length: 43.94 m (144 ft 2 in)
- Beam: 8.5 m (27 ft 11 in)
- Draft: 2.28 metres (7 ft 6 in)
- Propulsion: 2 propellers; 880 hp (660 kW); 2 x General Motors diesel engines
- Speed: 13.6 knots (25.2 km/h; 15.7 mph)
- Crew: 37
- Armament: 1 x double 20 mm machine guns

The Beemster class was a class of fourteen minesweepers that were built at different shipyards in the United States for the Royal Netherlands Navy (RNLN). The minesweepers were based on the AMS-60 design and paid for by the United States under the Mutual Defense Assistance Program (MDAP). The minesweepers served in the RNLN between 1953 and 1976.

== Design and construction ==
The fourteen Beemster-class minesweepers were ordered in 1951 in the United States. They were based on the AMS-60 design. The first ships were taken into service of the Royal Netherlands Navy in 1953 and the last in 1954.

As built the ships were equipped with a W Mk 3 mod 1 mechanical sweep and either a A X Mk 6B or A X Mk 4V acoustic sweeper. Furthermore, it had a double machine gun of 20 mm. Later, in the 1960s and 1970s, the ships got equipped with a MB 5 magnetic sweeper.

== Ships in class ==
The ships were named after the smaller Dutch municipalities that started with the letter B.

Beemster class construction data
Ship	Pennant No.	Laid down	Launched	Commissioned	Decommissioned
Beemster	M845	30 November 1951	24 September 1952	17 July 1953	14 August 1974
Bolsward	M846	8 October 1951	5 November 1952	5 November 1953	18 September 1972
Bedum	M847	14 December 1951	29 October 1952	28 August 1953	1 July 1976
Beilen	M848	29 October 1951	14 February 1953	26 April 1954	13 August 1975
Borculo	M849	29 December 1951	26 November 1952	20 October 1953	14 August 1974
Borne	M850	29 January 1952	7 January 1953	3 December 1953	13 August 1975
Brummen	M851	29 February 1952	31 December 1952	23 February 1954	14 August 1976
Breukelen	M852	29 February 1952	12 March 1953	15 February 1954	18 September 1972
Blaricum	M853	29 September 1952	31 October 1953	26 May 1954	1 July 1976
Brielle	M854	11 December 1952	17 October 1953	29 December 1954	13 August 1975
Breskens	M855	29 April 1952	11 April 1953	21 April 1954	1 July 1976
Bruinisse	M856	29 February 1952	31 December 1952	21 January 1954	18 September 1972
Boxtel	M857	1 May 1952	12 September 1953	28 July 1954	1 July 1976
Brouwershaven	M858	7 May 1952	19 April 1954	3 November 1954	2 July 1973
