= USS ATR-31 =

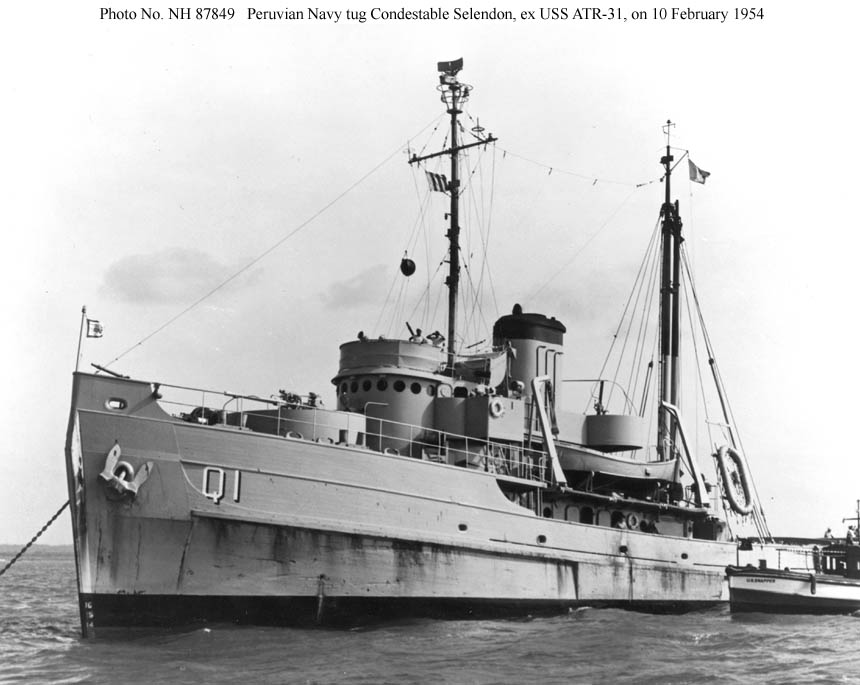
- The BAP Condestable Selendon (Q01) in 1954.

History

United States
- Name: U.S.S. ATR-31
- Builder: Northwest Shipbuilding
- Laid down: 7 September 1942
- Launched: 30 July 1943
- Commissioned: 30 October 1943
- Honors and awards: Two battle stars

Republic of Peru
- Name: B.A.P. Condestable Selendon (Q01)
- Commissioned: 5 September 1947
- Decommissioned: ???
- In service: 1947
- Out of service: ????
- Status: Unknown

General characteristics
- Displacement: 852 tons (light), 1,315 tons (full)
- Length: 165 feet 6 inches (50.44 m)
- Propulsion: one Fulton Iron Works vertical triple-expansion reciprocating steam engines; two Foster Wheeler "D" type boilers 200psi Sat°; two turbo-drive Ships' Service Generators, 60 kW, 120 V D.C.; single propeller, 1,600 shp
- Complement: 5 Officers, 47 Enlisted.
- Armament: one single 3"/50 dual purpose gun mount
- Aircraft carried: None
- Aviation facilities: None

USS ATR-31 was an ATR-1-class Rescue Ocean Tug of the United States Navy during World War II, and later the Peruvian Navy. Her fate is unknown.

== Ship History ==
ATR-31 was laid down by Northwest Shipbuilding Company on 7 September 1942 in South Bellingham, Washington. She was launched on 30 July 1943.

=== U.S. Navy Service ===
ATR-31 was commissioned into U.S. Naval Service on 30 October 1943. During World War II, ATR-31 was assigned to the Asiatic-Pacific Theater and participated in the Ormoc Bay and Leyte landings, as well as operations in West New Guinea. After the war, she was decommissioned sometime in 1945. ATR-31 was struck from the Naval Register in 1946.

=== Peruvian Navy Service ===
On 5 September 1947, the ship was transferred to the Republic of Peru, and began Peruvian Naval Service as the BAP Condestable Selendon (Q01). She was known to be in active service as of 10 February 1954. Her fate is unknown.

== Ship Awards ==
ATR-31 received two Battle Stars for World War II service.

Navy Unit Commendation	American Campaign Medal	Asiatic-Pacific Campaign Medal with 2 campaign stars
World War II Victory Medal	Philippine Presidential Unit Citation	Philippine Liberation Medal with service star
