= USC&GS Taku =

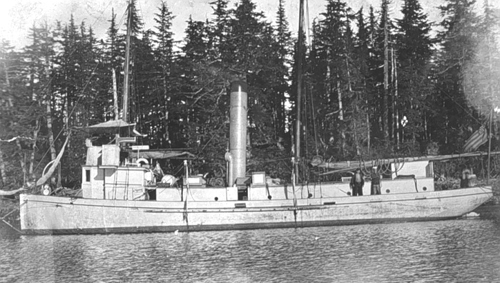
- USC&GS Taku

History

United States
- Name: Taku
- Namesake: Taku Inlet in southeast Alaska
- Builder: George Kneass, San Francisco, California
- Cost: $11,844.35 (USD)
- Completed: 1898
- Commissioned: 1898
- Decommissioned: 1917

General characteristics
- Type: Survey ship
- Length: 70.6 ft (21.5 m)
- Beam: 23.8 ft (7.3 m)
- Draft: 8.4 ft (2.6 m)
- Propulsion: Steam engine

USC&GS Taku was a United States Coast and Geodetic Survey survey ship in service from 1898 to 1917. It was the only Coast and Geodetic Survey ship to bear the name.

Taku was built by George Kneass at San Francisco, California, at a cost of $11,844.35 (USD) in 1898. The Coast and Geodetic Survey placed her in service that year. She spent her Survey career in the Pacific, primarily in the waters of the Territory of Alaska.

On July 15, 1898 Taku arrived "in disabled condition" at St. Michael, Alaska while the new steamer Yukon was being assembled. Urgent repairs to Taku slightly delayed assembly of Yukon. On July 30, she was seaworthy and Taku sailed at 2 p. m. on August 1, with a field party first to erect signals and do triangulation on St. Michael and Stuart Islands after which she departed for the mouth of the Kwiklok (Note: One of the outlets in the Yukon delta, now spelled Kwikluak (Geographic dictionary of Alaska)) for regular survey work. One of Taku's crew drowned when a small boat under sail was upset in Cordova Bay, Alaska, in 1910. Taku was retired from Coast and Geodetic Survey service in 1917.
