= Kneass Boat Works =

Shipyard in San Francisco, California, United States

Coordinates: 37.763853°N 122.386429°W

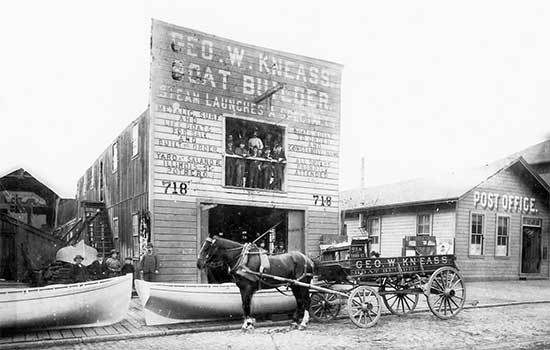
Kneass boat shop on 3rd Street in San Francisco, California, in 1899

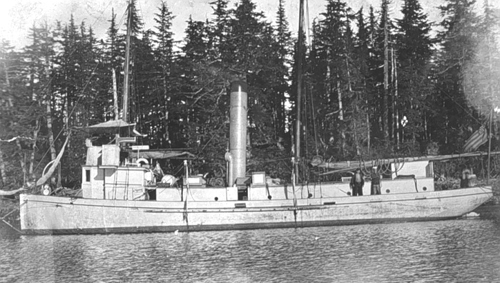
USC&GS Taku an 1898 70-foot survey ship

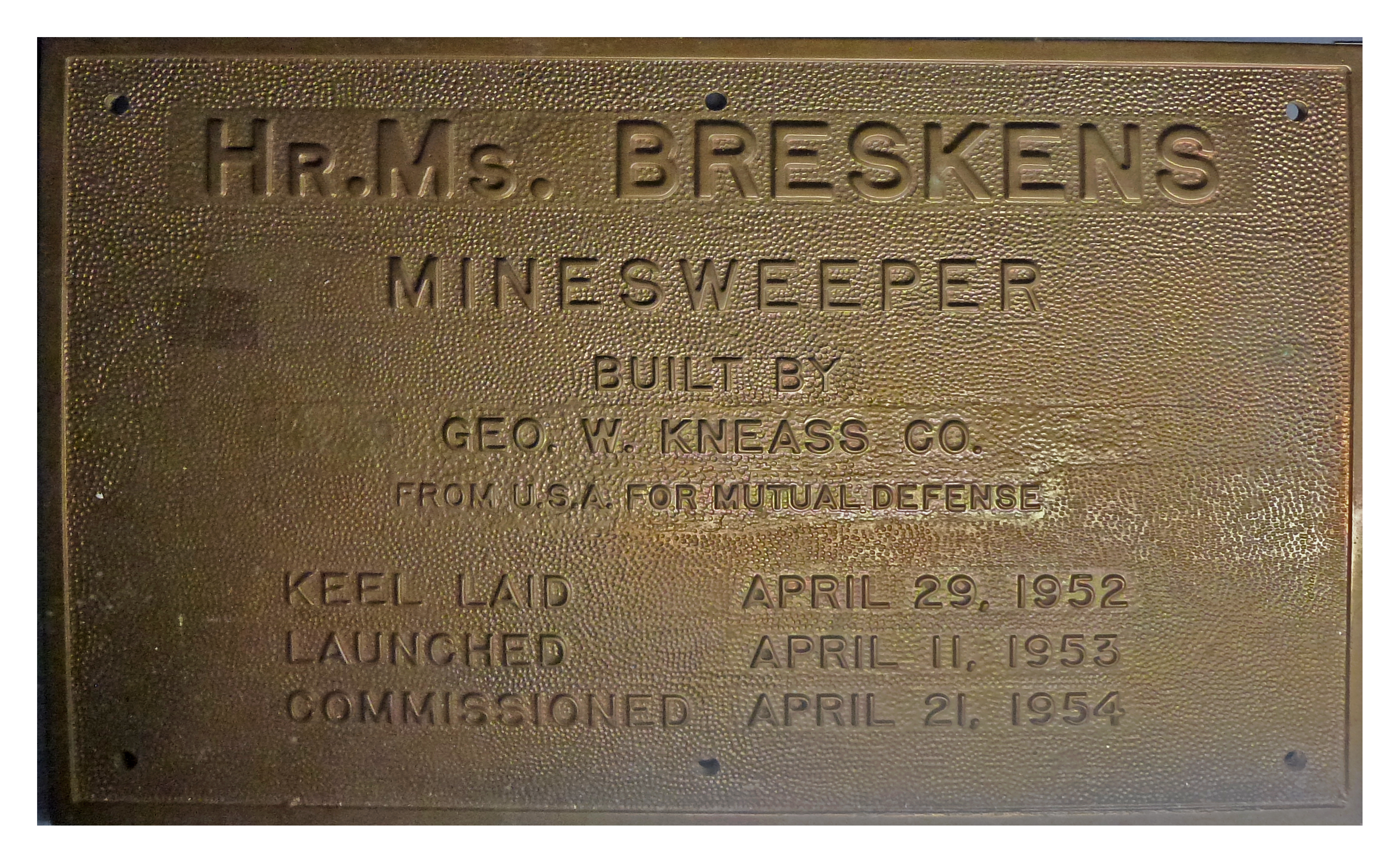
Plaque from the Hr.Ms. Breskens, a Royal Netherlands Navy Beemster-class minesweeper

Kneass Boat Works was a shipbuilding company in San Francisco, California. To support the World War 2 demand for ships, Kneass Boat Works built: US Navy Sub chasers, US Army barges and tugboats. Kneass Boat Works was started by California native George Washington Kneass (1859–1923) in 1868, at 22 Mission Street, San Francisco. George Kneass started as an apprentice to boat builder Martin Vice. The two became partners operating a shipyard at Pier 70 at 671 Illinois Street, San Francisco. Business was good and in 1898 Kneass opened a second shipyard at 718 3rd Street, San Francisco. At its peak, Kneass employed 50 workers. George Kneass died in 1923 and his two sons, George Jr. and Webster, took over the shipyard. Kneass built small boats, launches, rowboats, barges, lifeboats), sailboats, and a few wooden cruisers. For World War 2, in 1941 the company built a small emergency shipyard. The shipyard closed in 1970, but the site is now the art studio of Ruth Kneass; she kept the boatyard name for her studio.

== Honors ==
The United States Government awarded Webster Lincoln Kneass a certificate of Outstanding Service to the Country for both its WWI and WWII efforts in 1945. Kneass Boat Works built over 5000 watercraft for World War 1 and World War 2. Many of the watercraft were lifeboats and patrol boats. but some 150-foot minesweepers were also built. The U.S. Navy still uses a lifeboat that was designed by George Kneass.

== Submarine chaser ==
Kneass Boat Works built submarine chasers that were of the SC-497-class submarine chaser design that had a displacement of 94 tons with a length of 110 feet (34 m), a beam of 17 feet (5.2 m), a draft of 6 feet (1.8 m), a top speed of 21 knots (39 km/h; 24 mph). They had a crew of 28. Power was provided by two 1,540-brake-horsepower (1,150 kW) General Motors, Electro-Motive Division, 16-184A diesel engines, and two propellers. They were armed with one Bofors 40 mm gun, two Browning M2 .50 cal. machine guns, two depth charge projector "Y guns", and two depth charge tracks.

== Notable ships ==
Notable ships include:

- USC&GS Taku an 1898 70-foot survey ship.
- Three Adjutant-class minesweepers.
- Quic Chakidn 1921 38-foot cruisers built for owner of Sierra Nevada Wood & Lumber Company, Walter Hobert Jr. for his Lake Tahoe home.
- The Pacific an 18-foot Kneass schooner was sailed in 1882 by Bernard Gilboy from San Francisco 7,000 miles (11,265 km) across the Pacific to Queensland, Australia.
- Amy K IV 32-foot 1940 Yacht, was owned by the Terazas family.
- Merciqme Yacht was owned by Judy and Avery Blake, commodore of the Northern California Classic Yacht Association.
- Siren 34-foot 1939 Yacht, owned by Alan Bowerman.
- Marlin 46-foot 1928 Yacht, owned by Thomas Bottenberg of Vintage Yacht Partners
- Two patrol boats for Peru Navy in 1918, the El Captain I and El Captain 2.
- M 857 Hr.Ms. Boxtel 1954 114-foot Royal Netherlands Navy Beemster Class minesweeper, scrapped in 1976
- M 855 Hr.Ms. Breskens 1954 114-foot Royal Netherlands Navy Beemster Class minesweeper, renamed Kalbarrie then Pax
- USS Nasomee (YTB-260), US Navy Tugboat, Cahto-class district harbor tug.

== Ships ==
Ship ID	Name	Owner	Type	Tons	Year built	Notes
na	USC&GS Taku	US C&GS	Survey Vessel		1898	Retired in 1917
216035	Mary Francis		Fishing Vessel	15	1918	Formerly Marge S, active
na	H. D. Geddings	US Quarantine Svce	Boarding Boat		1921	
na	Donald Currie	US Quarantine Svce	Boarding Boat		1921	
	Francesca	Y. C. Demming	Sloop		1922	
	Hummingbird	C. D. Parmalee	Sloop		1929	San Francisco Bird Boat #22 Active
231123	Rejoice	Boy Scouts	Unclassified	24	1931	Active
331852	North Star	Fred Carpenter	Cargo Vessel		1935	Under restoration
263739	Soupfin		Fishing Vessel	11	1937	Active
260797	J V Ferrante		Fishing Vessel	7	1939	Formerly Jackie Jan, active
281626	Amy K IV		Recreational	12	1940	Active
SC 990		US Navy	Sub Chaser	136	Mar-43	Sold in 1948
SC 991		US Navy	Sub Chaser	136	Apr-43	Sold in 1948
SC 992		US Navy	Sub Chaser	136	Jun-43	Sold in 1948
SC 993		US Navy	Sub Chaser	136	Jun-43	Sold in 1948
SC 994		US Navy	Sub Chaser	136	Jul-43	Sold in 1948
YT 260	Nasomsee	US Navy	Tug	400	Jul-44	Renamed YTB 260, Sold in 1946
251273	Sparky Anne		Recreational	26	1946	Active
502915	Sigrid		Fishing Vessel	10	1946	Active
252049	Christine		Fishing Vessel	9	1947	Active
256552	Nina T		Fishing Vessel	9	1948	Active
259369	Flying Cloud		Fishing Vessel	15	1950	Active
262499	Blue Northern		Fishing Vessel	14	1951	Active
264893	Star of the Sea		Fishing Vessel	14	1953	Active
MSC 148	Beskens	US Navy	Minesweeper	390	7-Apr-54	To the Netherlands 1954 as M 855, returned 1975, Sold in to the Nizam of Hyderabad 1976 as Kalbarrie
MSC 149	Boxtel	US Navy	Minesweeper	390	24-Jul-54	To the Netherlands 1954 as M 857, struck 1975
MSC 150	Brouwershaven	US Navy	Minesweeper	390	30-Oct-54	To the Netherlands 1954 as M 858, struck 1974
510669	Chichagof		Recreational	17	1959	Active
523607	Charlie Tuna		Fishing Vessel	26	1965	Active

== See also ==
- California during World War II
- Maritime history of California
- Wooden boats of World War 2
