= USNS David C. Shanks =

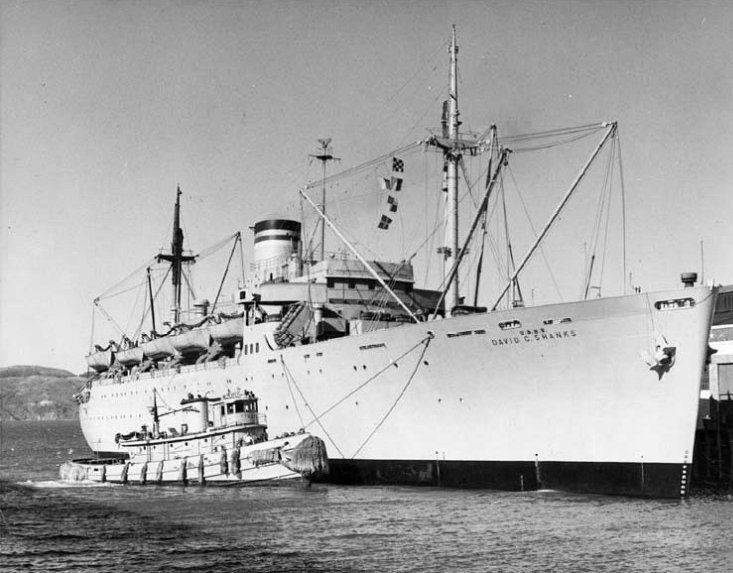
- USNS David C. Shanks (T-AP-180) alongside the USS Hiawatha (YTB-265), San Francisco, 1950s

History

United States
- Name: David C. Shanks (T-AP-180)
- Namesake: Major General David Carey Shanks, US Army
- Builder: Ingalls Shipbuilding
- Yard number: 298
- Christened: American Farmer
- Completed: April 1943
- Acquired: (By the Army): 24 April 1943
- In service: Army:1943–1950; MSTS: 15 Mar 1950 – Oct 1959
- Identification: MC Hull Type C3-1N-P&C; MC Hull No. 165
- Honors and awards: One battle star for Korean War service

General characteristics
- Class & type: George W. Goethals-class transport
- Displacement: 10,418 tons (fl)
- Length: 489 ft
- Beam: 69 ft 6 in
- Draft: 27 ft 4 in
- Propulsion: Steam turbine, single screw
- Speed: 16.5 knots
- Troops: 1,935 (Original Army configuration); 329 cabin (dependents), 684 troops for total of 1,013 (At layup)
- Armament: None

David C. Shanks was a troop transport that served with the US Army during World War II as USAT David C. Shanks, and during the Korean War with the US Navy's Military Sea Transportation Service as the USNS David C. Shanks (T-AP-180).

== Service history ==
The ship was laid down for the Maritime Commission (MC) as MC hull 165, yard hull number 298, with prospective names of American Farmer / Gulfport, a Type C3-1N-P&C (Passenger & Cargo) ship by Ingalls Shipbuilding of Pascagoula, Mississippi. The ship was allocated to the War Department, completed on 24 April 1943 and turned over for operation by the US Army Transportation Service at Mobile, Alabama as USAT David C . Shanks.

== Army transport ==
Completed as an Army troop transport named for Major General David C. Shanks, the commander of the Port of Hoboken during World War I, the 12,097 GRT, 489 ft (149.0 m) overall length ship with capacity for 1,935 passengers was accepted by the Army, briefly put into New Orleans and made a voyage to Jamaica and return to New Orleans.

In June 1943 the ship transferred to the Pacific stopping at San Francisco Port of Embarkation for a voyage to Honolulu. The next voyage in July was for the South West Pacific theatre (SWPA) to Brisbane and Milne Bay. In September the ship returned to San Francisco, where minor modifications improving ventilation and armament were made with operations resumed to SWPA ports including Auckland, Oro Bay, Noumea, Biak, and others.

The transport left San Francisco for the Atlantic in July 1945 going to Leghorn, Italy returning troops to Hampton Roads. From Hampton Roads the transport made two round trips to Marseille and Gibraltar before stopping at New York in December 1945 before sailing for Leyte, Philippines. On return 1 February 1946 to San Francisco after that voyage the ship underwent modifications to transport 430 dependents and 678 troops. After modification the transport made a voyage to Honolulu, Auckland, and Sydney.

== Transfer to Navy ==
On 15 March 1950, along with most of the Army's large transports, the ship was transferred to the MSTS designated USNS David C. Shanks (T-AP-180). Navy shifted the transport's home port, then Seattle, to San Francisco where voyages were made throughout the Pacific, including Honolulu, Manila, Guam, Kwajalein, Alaska, Japan, and Taiwan. In September 1959 the transport made final arrival at Los Angeles before shifting to San Francisco in October for inactivation and layup. The ship participated in operations to contain the Communist Chinese advance in Korea during the conflict there between December 1950 – January 1951, and earned a battle star for her service. The final transport configuration at layup was for a total of 1,013 passengers, 329 cabin and 684 troops.

== Inactivation and disposal ==
David C. Shanks was inactivated and placed in the National Defense Reserve Fleet Suisun Bay on 27 October 1959 with permanent transfer to the Maritime Administration on 1 November 1960. The ship was sold for scrap on 1 March 1973 for $65,000 but the buyer defaulted. A later sale to Interocean Grain Storage Co., Ltd. for "Nontransportation use" (Note: Sale for nontransportation use indicates sale for other than scrapping. The first, defaulted, sale noted "(scrap)" and the second specifies (Nontransportation use)" and the buyer indicates possible use as a storage hulk.) for $112,080 was completed and the ship withdrawn from the reserve fleet on 24 August 1973.
