= Dominican ship Separación =

Dominican ship Separación may refer to one of the following ships of the Dominican Navy:

- Separación Dominicana, the first armed Dominican naval vessel
- Dominican ship Separación (BM454), the former American Admirable-class minesweeper USS Skirmish (AM-303); acquired by the Dominican Navy in January 1965; renamed Prestol Botello, 1976 and in active service
- Dominican ship Separación (P208), the former American Cohoes-class net laying ship USS Passaconaway (AN-86); acquired by the Dominican Navy in September 1976 and is in active service
