= Manayunk =

Manayunk can refer to:

- Manayunk, Philadelphia, a neighborhood in the U.S. city of Philadelphia, Pennsylvania
- USS Ajax (1869), a former U.S. Navy vessel originally named USS Manayunk
- USS Manayunk (AN-81), a former U.S. Navy net laying ship
- Pretzel Park in Philadelphia, formerly known as Manayunk Park.
