= USS Waxsaw (AN-91) =

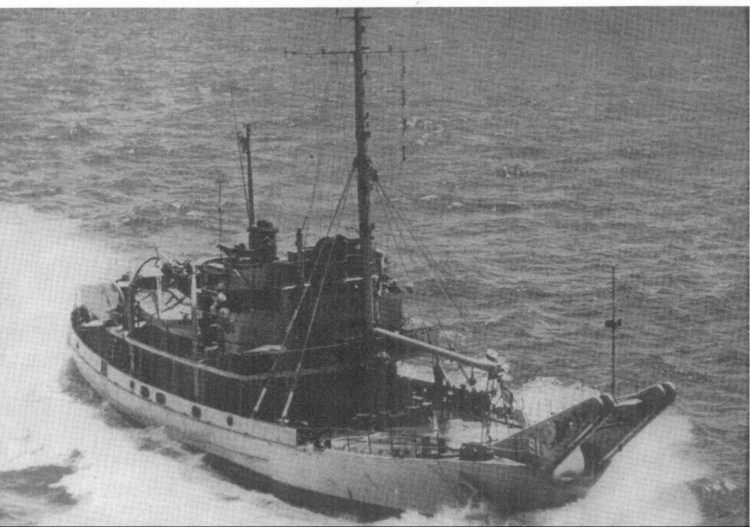
- USS Waxsaw (AN-91)

History

United States
- Name: Waxsaw
- Namesake: Waxhaw people
- Builder: Zenith Dredge Company, Duluth, Minnesota
- Laid down: 1 May 1944
- Launched: 15 September 1944
- Sponsored by: Mrs. J. L. Conlon, wife of the general manager of the Zenith Dredge Co. shipyard
- Commissioned: 6 May 1945
- Decommissioned: 23 March 1960
- Stricken: 3 January 1976
- Home port: Melville, Rhode Island and Tiburon, California
- Identification: YN-120; AN-91
- Fate: Transferred to Venezuela, October 1963
- Notes: Sold outright to Venezuela, 1 December 1977

Venezuela
- Name: ARBV Puerto Miranda
- Acquired: October 1963 (leased); 1 December 1977 (purchased)
- Identification: H-80

General characteristics
- Class & type: Cohoes-class net laying ship
- Displacement: 775 tons
- Length: 168 ft 6 in (51.36 m)
- Beam: 33 ft 10 in (10.31 m)
- Draft: 10 ft 9 in (3.28 m)
- Propulsion: Diesel direct drive, 2,500 hp (1,900 kW), single propeller
- Speed: 12 knots (22 km/h; 14 mph)
- Complement: 46 officers and enlisted
- Armament: 1 x 3"/50 caliber gun

USS Waxsaw (YN-120/AN-91) was a Cohoes-class net laying ship which was assigned to protect United States Navy ships and harbors during World War II with her anti-submarine nets. Her World War II career was cut short due to the war coming to an end, but, post-war, she was reactivated and served the Navy until she was put into reserve and eventually transferred to Venezuela as Puerto Miranda.

== Construction and career ==
The second ship to be so named by the Navy, Waxsaw (AN-91) -- originally classified as YN-120—was laid down on 31 May 1944, at Duluth, Minnesota, by the Zenith Dredge Co.; launched on 15 September 1944; sponsored by Mrs. J. L. Conlon, wife of the general manager of the Zenith Dredge Co. shipyard; and commissioned on 6 May 1945.

=== World War II related service ===
The new netlaying ship sailed for Boston, Massachusetts, on 11 May, and arrived there on 29 May, after steaming via Cleveland, Ohio; Ogdensburg, New York; the St. Lawrence Seaway; Cornwall, Ontario; Montreal and Quebec, Quebec; and Halifax, Nova Scotia. Following shakedown out of Melville, Rhode Island, from 13 to 30 June, the netlayer put into Boston for post-shakedown availability.

Waxsaw headed for the Panama Canal on 10 July, expecting her ultimate destination to be Pearl Harbor in the Hawaiian Islands. However, upon her arrival at the Small Craft Training Center, San Pedro, Los Angeles, she was ordered to the Naval Net Depot and Training School, Tiburon Bay, California, for 18 days of refresher training.

Arriving there on 10 August, the ship remained in the San Francisco, California, region on temporary duty in connection with the removal of the net line protecting San Francisco after the Japanese surrender in mid-August. Completing that duty on 24 September, Waxsaw underwent an availability at Alameda, California, before she was assigned to the U.S. Atlantic Fleet.

=== Post-war service ===
On 12 October 1945, the netlayer headed for the East Coast of the United States in company with sister ship Tunxis. Attached to Service Force, Atlantic Fleet, on 3 November, Waxsaw operated at Green Cove Springs, Florida, establishing moorings at the St. Johns River area for the Reserve Fleet units until late in 1949, when she was shifted to her new home port of Norfolk, Virginia.

From mid-July 1946 to mid January 1947, the ship operated as part of US Atlantic Mine Fleet, with Norfolk, Virginia as home port. The ship ferried large mooring buoys from Norfolk to Charleston, South Carolina in July and August. Waxsaw served at Argentia Naval Base, Newfoundland replacing mooring buoys with larger units from beginning of September thru mid-December 1946 when severe winter weather forced termination of activity from whence ship returned to home port.

Based there at the time of the outbreak of the Korean War in the summer of 1950, Waxsaw not only took part in extensive netlaying operations in Hampton Roads, Virginia, but also towed targets and participated in various training exercises in ensuing months.

For the next nine years, Waxsaw operated with the Atlantic Fleet off the eastern seaboard of the United States, ranging from Nova Scotia to Key West, Florida. Her home ports during this time included Norfolk, Virginia; Key West, Florida; and Charleston, South Carolina.

During those years, Waxsaw performed a variety of service functions; participated in mine-hunting exercises; laid nets and buoys during U.S. Atlantic Fleet amphibious exercises including amphibious maneuvers off Onslow Beach, North Carolina; cleared objects from the channel entrance at Hampton Roads; and even briefly operated at Charleston as a salvage vessel equipped with compressors, a recompression chamber, and other deep-sea diving gear. She also took part in NATO exercises off Nova Scotia and served at the Mine Defense Laboratory at Panama City, Florida.

=== Final inactivation ===
Decommissioned on 23 March 1960, Waxsaw was ultimately transferred under the Mutual Defense Assistance Act to Venezuela in October 1963. Renamed Puerto Miranda (H-30), the netlayer served with the Venezuelan Navy as a survey ship into the late 1970s. Struck from the Navy List in December 1977, the ship was deleted from the Venezuelan Navy List apparently soon thereafter.
