= Etlah =

Etlah may refer to:

- Etlah, Missouri, a community in the United States
- USS Etlah (disambiguation), multiple warships
