= USS Tonawanda (AN-89) =

History

United States
- Name: Tonawanda
- Namesake: Tonawanda Creek
- Builder: Leathem D. Smith Shipbuilding Company, Sturgeon Bay, Wisconsin
- Laid down: 12 September 1944
- Launched: 14 November 1944
- Sponsored by: Mrs. Charles N. Barnum
- Commissioned: 9 May 1945
- Decommissioned: 9 August 1946, at Orange Texas
- Home port: Melville, Rhode Island and Tiburon, California
- Identification: YN-115; AN-89
- Recommissioned: 18 March 1952, at Orange, Texas
- Decommissioned: 18 December 1959, at Bayonne, New Jersey
- Fate: Leased to Haiti under terms of the Military Assistance Program, 25 May 1960
- Notes: Sold outright to Haiti in late 1979

Haiti
- Name: Jean-Jacques Dessalines
- Namesake: Jean-Jacques Dessalines
- Acquired: 25 May 1960 (lease); 1979 (purchase)
- Identification: MH-101

General characteristics
- Class & type: Cohoes-class net laying ship
- Displacement: 775 tons
- Length: 168 ft 6 in (51.36 m)
- Beam: 33 ft 10 in (10.31 m)
- Draft: 10 ft 9 in (3.28 m)
- Propulsion: Diesel direct drive, 2,500 hp (1,900 kW), single propeller
- Speed: 12 knots (22 km/h; 14 mph)
- Complement: 46 officers and enlisted
- Armament: 1 x 3"/50 caliber gun

USS Tonawanda (YN-115/AN-89) was a Cohoes-class net laying ship which was assigned to protect U.S. Navy ships and harbors during World War II by deploying and maintaining anti-submarine nets. Her World War II career was short due to the war coming to an end, but, post-war, she was reactivated in 1952 and served the Navy until 1959 when she was put into reserve and eventually transferred to Haiti as Jean-Jacques Dessalines.

== Construction and career ==
The second ship to be so named by the Navy, Tonawanda (AN-89) was laid down on 12 September 1944, at Sturgeon Bay, Wisconsin, by the Leathem D. Smith Shipbuilding Company; launched on 14 November 1944; sponsored by Mrs. Charles N. Barnum; and commissioned on 9 May 1945.

=== World War II related service ===
The net laying ship departed Sturgeon Bay on 19 May and, after a voyage across the Great Lakes and down the St. Lawrence River, arrived in Boston, Massachusetts, on 4 June. After a short availability, she moved to Melville, Rhode Island, on the 19th for shakedown training and daily net laying drills in Narragansett Bay.

Tonawanda stood out of Boston harbor again on 18 July and shaped a course south to Key West, Florida, and thence to the Panama Canal. She transited the canal on 2 and 3 August and continued her voyage to San Pedro, California, where she arrived on 15 August, the day after hostilities in the Pacific Ocean ceased.

=== Post-war service ===
She reported for duty in the 11th Naval District and, for the next 10 weeks, Tonawanda operated in the 11th Naval District at San Pedro, Seal Beach, Long Beach, and Port Hueneme, disposing of nets and salvaging net buoys. On 27 November, the ship stood out of San Pedro Bay and headed back to the Panama Canal which she transited on the 8th. Continuing north, Tonawanda arrived in Norfolk, Virginia, on 19 November and reported for duty with the Service Force, Atlantic Fleet.

On 3 January 1946, she received orders to duty in the 7th Naval District and, on 4 January, stood out of the Chesapeake Bay and turned south. She reached Miami, Florida, on 7 January and began assisting in hydrographic triangulation surveys in the Florida-Cuba-Bahamas area. That duty lasted until 7 April when the net laying ship departed Miami in company with USS Marietta for New Orleans, Louisiana.

=== Inactivation ===
Tonwanda remained in New Orleans from 25 April to 11 May, when she shifted to Orange, Texas, to prepare for inactivation. Tonawanda was decommissioned on 9 August 1946 and berthed at Orange.

=== Recommissioned in 1952 ===
On 18 March 1952, after almost six years in reserve, Tonawanda was recommissioned at Orange.

After trials off Sabine Pass, Texas, she departed the Texas coast on 21 March bound for New England duty in the 1st Naval District. The ship arrived in Boston on 1 April and entered the Bethlehem Simpson Shipyard to complete outfitting.

On 10 June, she moved to the Net Depot at Melville, Rhode Island, where she began seven years of experimental net installation duties in the vicinity of Melville and Boston. Periodically, she departed the New England coast to conduct underway training and mine warfare tactics exercises in the Chesapeake Bay and off the Virginia Capes.

On two occasions, from 28 August to 21 October 1955 and from 2 May to 30 June 1956, temporary duty with the Mine Warfare Evaluation Detachment, Key West, Florida, interrupted her routine along the New England coast. During those two periods, she assisted other ships assigned to the detachment in experiments in mine planting, testing, recovery, and in overall mine warfare tactics development. After each of these tours, she resumed normal operations out of Melville and Boston.

=== Final decommissioning ===
On 16 November 1959, Tonawanda departed Boston and headed for Bayonne, New Jersey, to prepare once more for inactivation. On 18 December 1959, Tonawanda was decommissioned at Bayonne and assigned to the New York Group, Atlantic Reserve Fleet.

She remained there until 25 May 1960 when she was leased to the government of Haiti under the terms of the Military Assistance Program. As of late 1979, she was still serving the Haitian government as Jean-Jacques Dessalines (MH-10) when she was disposed of by sale to Haiti by the United States. Her current fate is unknown.
