= USS Suncook (AN-80) =

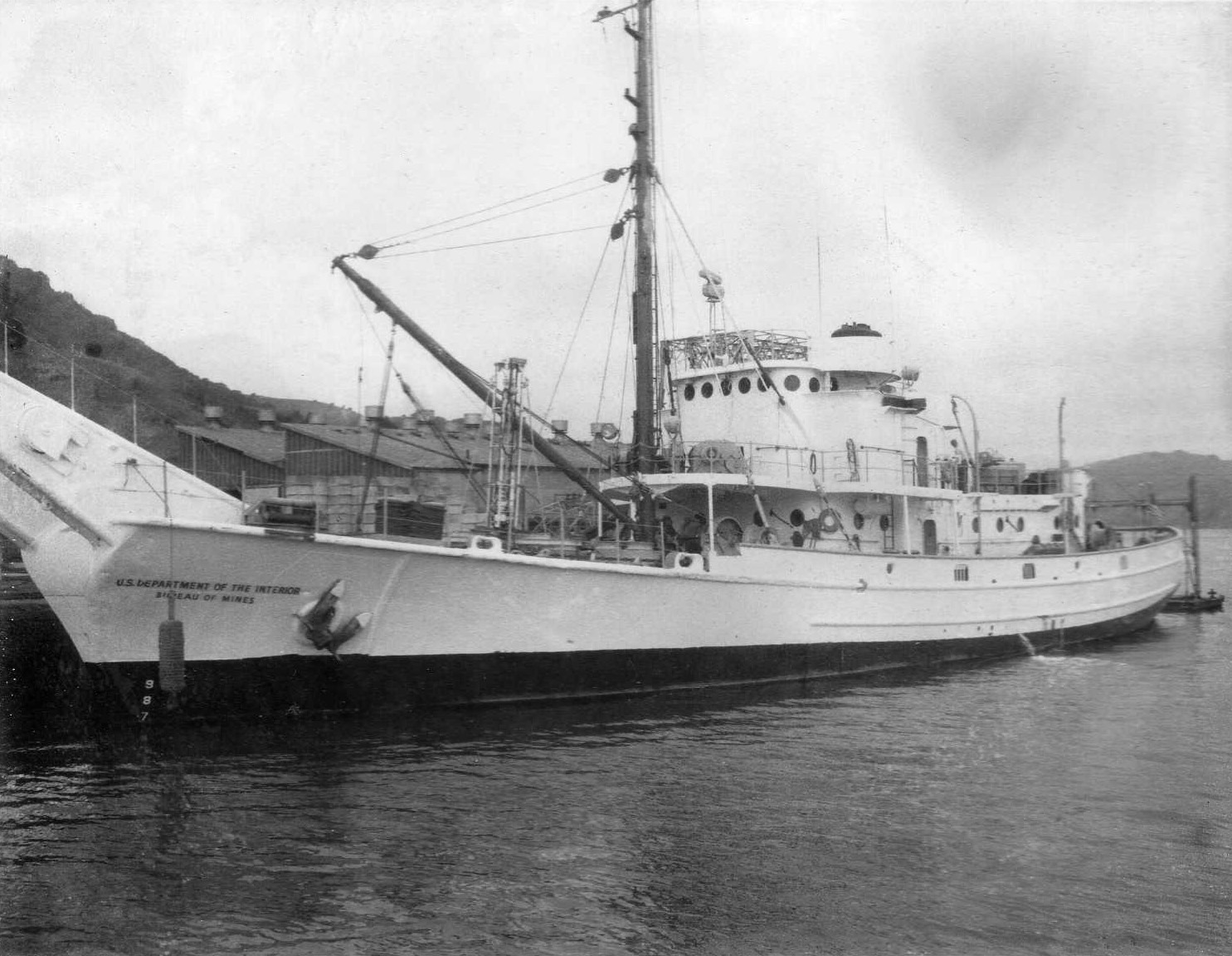

History

United States
- Name: USS Suncook
- Builder: Commercial Iron Works, Portland, Oregon
- Laid down: 30 November 1944
- Launched: 16 February 1945
- Sponsored by: Mrs. Laura B. Stephenson
- Commissioned: 5 May 1945
- Decommissioned: 12 June 1947 at Astoria, Oregon
- Stricken: 1 September 1962
- Identification: YN-99 (1944); AN-80 (17 January 1945)
- Fate: Transferred to MARAD in August 1961
- Name: Grass Valley
- Operator: United States Bureau of Mines
- Acquired: September 1962
- Fate: Sold for scrapping, 28 July 1971
- Notes: used as a research vessel

General characteristics
- Class & type: Cohoes-class net laying ship
- Displacement: 775 tons
- Length: 168 ft 6 in (51.36 m)
- Beam: 33 ft 10 in (10.31 m)
- Draft: 10 ft 10 in (3.30 m)
- Propulsion: Diesel direct drive, 2,500 hp (1,900 kW), single propeller
- Speed: 12.3 knots (22.8 km/h; 14.2 mph)
- Complement: 46 officers and enlisted
- Armament: 1 x 3 in (76 mm)/50 gun; 4 x single 20 mm cannons

USS Suncook (YN-99/AN-80) was a Cohoes-class net laying ship which was assigned to protect United States Navy ships and harbors during World War II with her anti-submarine nets. Her World War II career was short lived; however, after decommissioning, she was reactivated in 1962 for use as a research ship for the U.S. Bureau of Mines, where she served as Grass Valley.

== Construction and career ==
Suncook was laid down at Portland, Oregon on 30 November 1944 by the Commercial Iron Works. The ship was launched on 16 February 1945, sponsored by Mrs. Laura B. Stephenson. Suncook was commissioned on 5 May 1945.

=== World War II service ===
Suncook conducted shakedown and training off the California coast until 8 July, when she departed for Pearl Harbor. From there, she was routed on to Eniwetok Atoll in the central Pacific Ocean. She arrived at the anchorage on 1 August, just two weeks before the cessation of hostilities. There she tended nets for the next seven months, making one round-trip voyage to Ponape and back in December 1945.

=== Post-war service ===
In March 1946, she sailed to Guam in company with Shakamaxon and after two weeks there, continued on to Bikini Atoll in the Marshall Islands, where she arrived on 30 March.

Suncook remained in the vicinity of Bikini and Kwajalein Atolls until September, supporting the atomic bomb tests known as Operation Crossroads. On 2 September, she cleared the area and sailed via Pearl Harbor to the U.S. West Coast. She reached Seattle, Washington, on 30 September and remained there until June of the following year, undergoing radiological clearance.

=== Post-USN service and disposition ===
In January 1947, she was placed in reserve, but remained in commission. On 10 June, she departed Seattle, and arrived, two days later, in Astoria, Oregon, where she was placed out of commission. She remained with the "mothball" fleet until August 1961, when custody was transferred to the U.S. Maritime Administration.

In September 1962, she was again transferred, this time to the U.S. Bureau of Mines for use as a research ship at the Marine Mineral Technology Center at Tiburon, California.

=== Re-named Grass Valley ===
Her name was struck from the Navy List on 1 September 1962 and she became the research vessel, Grass Valley. She served under that name until returned to the Navy for disposal on 18 June 1968. On 28 July 1971, her hulk was sold to the Waterman Supply Co., Wilmington, California.
