= USS Passaic (AN-87) =

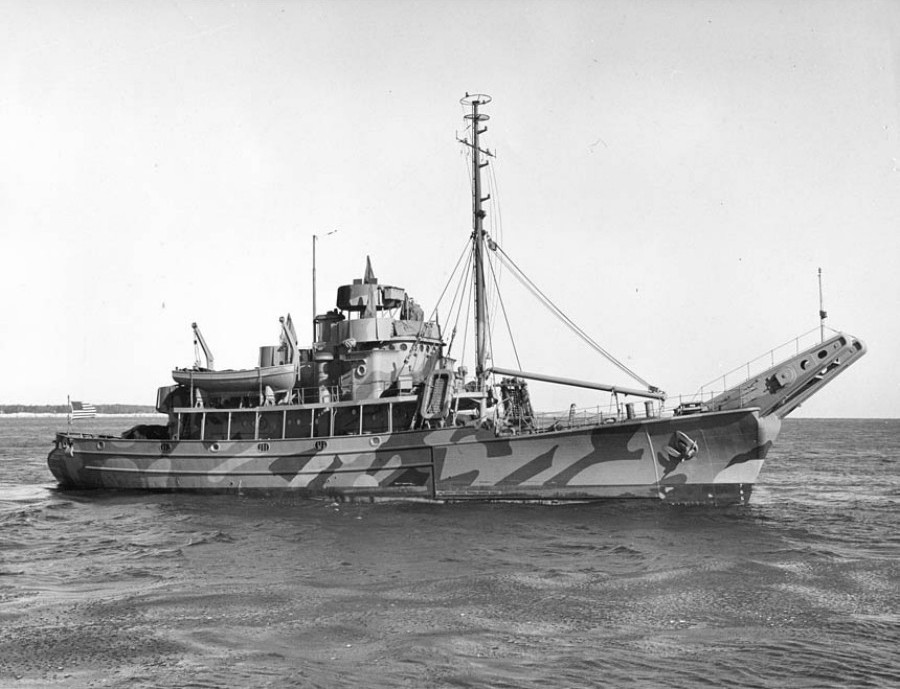
- USS Passaic (AN-87)

History

United States
- Name: Passaic
- Namesake: City of Passaic, New Jersey
- Builder: Leathem D. Smith Shipbuilding Company, Sturgeon Bay, Wisconsin
- Laid down: 25 April 1944
- Launched: 29 June 1944
- Sponsored by: Mrs. Sam H. North
- Commissioned: 6 March 1945
- Decommissioned: March 1947, San Diego, California
- Home port: Pearl Harbor, Hawaii; San Diego, California
- Identification: YN-113; AN-87 (14 January 1944)
- Fate: Transferred to the Dominican Republic, September 1976

Dominican Republic
- Name: Calderas
- Acquired: September 1976
- Identification: P209
- Status: in active service, as of 2007

General characteristics
- Class & type: Cohoes-class net laying ship
- Displacement: 775 tons
- Length: 168 ft 6 in (51.36 m)
- Beam: 31 ft 10 in (9.70 m)
- Draft: 10 ft 10 in (3.30 m)
- Propulsion: Diesel-electric, 2,500 hp (1,900 kW)
- Speed: 12.3 knots (22.8 km/h; 14.2 mph)
- Complement: 46 officers and enlisted
- Armament: 1 x 3"/50 caliber gun; 3 x single 20 mm guns AA gun mounts

USS Passaic (YN-113/AN-87) was a Cohoes-class net laying ship built for the United States Navy during World War II. She was commissioned in March 1945 and spent her entire career in the Pacific Ocean. She was decommissioned in March 1947 and placed in reserve. She was sold to the Dominican Republic in September 1976, as patrol vessel Calderas (P209). As of 2007, Calderas remained active in the Dominican Navy.

== Construction ==
Passaic, the second U.S. Navy ship to be so named, was originally authorized as YN–113; redesignated AN–87 on 17 January 1944; laid down at Leathem D. Smith Shipbuilding Company, Sturgeon Bay, Wisconsin, 25 April 1944; launched 29 June 1944; sponsored by Mrs. Sam H. North; and commissioned 6 March 1945.

== Service history ==
During the final months of World War II, Passaic was assigned to the U.S. Pacific Fleet and rendered valuable supporting action, maintaining and recovering antisubmarine nets in Pacific waters.

After war-time service, Passaic remained at Pearl Harbor, Hawaii, until 1947, when she reported to San Diego, California. Decommissioning in March, she remained in reserve there until July 1963. She was then transferred to the U.S. Maritime Administration, and laid up at Suisun Bay with the National Defense Reserve Fleet. Passaconaway was transferred to the Dominican Republic in September 1976 as patrol vessel Calderas (P209). As of 2007, the ship remained in active service with the Dominican Navy.
