= USS Etlah =

Two warships of the United States Navy have borne the name USS Etlah, derived from a Native American word meaning "White Lily".

- USS Etlah (1864), a Casco-class monitor, that was never commissioned. She was completed too late to be used in the American Civil War, and set laid up until 1874 when she was sold to be broken up.
- USS Etlah (AN-79), commissioned on 16 December 1944 and served in the Second World and Korean Wars as an antisubmarine vessel. She was decommissioned 31 May 1960. Etlah received two battle stars for Korean War service.
