= USS Yazoo (AN-92) =

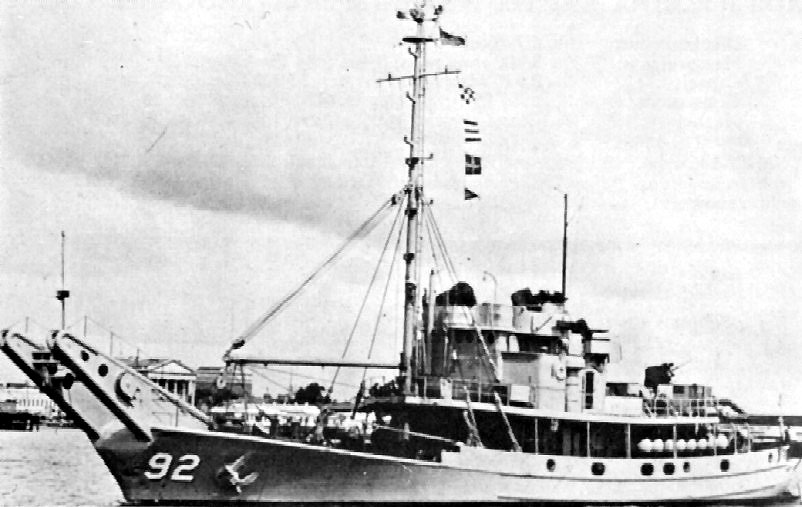
- USS Yazoo (AN-92)

History

United States
- Name: Yazoo
- Namesake: Yazoo River
- Builder: Zenith Dredge Company, Duluth, Minnesota
- Laid down: 6 July 1944
- Launched: 18 October 1944
- Sponsored by: Mrs. S. H. Griffin, the wife of Colonel S. H. Griffin, USA
- Commissioned: 31 May 1945
- Decommissioned: 28 August 1962
- Stricken: 1 July 1963
- Home port: Norfolk, Virginia; Key West, Florida; Charleston, South Carolina
- Identification: YN-121; AN-92
- Honors and awards: Battle efficiency competition award for the fiscal year 1960
- Fate: Scrapped in 1975

General characteristics
- Class & type: Cohoes-class net laying ship
- Displacement: 775 tons
- Length: 168 ft 6 in (51.36 m)
- Beam: 33 ft 10 in (10.31 m)
- Draft: 10 ft 9 in (3.28 m)
- Propulsion: Diesel direct drive, 2,500 hp (1,900 kW), single propeller
- Speed: 12 knots (22 km/h; 14 mph)
- Complement: 46 officers and enlisted
- Armament: 1 x 3"/50 caliber gun

USS Yazoo (YN-121/AN-92) was a Cohoes-class net laying ship which was assigned to protect United States Navy ships and harbors during World War II with her anti-submarine nets. Her World War II career was cut short due to the war coming to an end, but, post-war, she was reactivated and served the Navy in a variety of ways until she was decommissioned in 1962.

== Construction and career ==
The second ship to be so named by the Navy, Yazoo (AN-92) was laid down on 6 July 1944, at Duluth, Minnesota, by the Zenith Dredge Co., and was launched on 18 October 1944; sponsored by Mrs. S. H. Griffin, the wife of Colonel S. H. Griffin, USA; and commissioned on 31 May 1945.

=== World War II related service ===
Yazoo departed Duluth on 15 June, bound for the Atlantic Ocean; travelling via the Great Lakes and the St. Lawrence Seaway; and arrived at the Boston Navy Yard to commence fitting out. After shakedown training out of Melville, Rhode Island, she underwent post-shakedown alterations at Boston, Massachusetts. She conducted net defense evolutions at Melville before beginning net-laying operations which she carried out in the vicinities of Newport, Rhode Island, New York City, and Boston during the next 18 months.

=== Post-war service ===
Yazoo departed Newport on 13 May 1947 and laid fleet moorings at Argentia, Newfoundland, before returning from that cruise on 18 August to resume local operations. She operated out of Newport into 1948. In January of that year, her duties included ice-breaking in the channels of Narragansett Bay after the severe winter weather had frozen the water there.

=== Operation Martex ===
That spring, Yazoo pulled a large Navy cargo vessel off the beach at Davisville, Rhode Island between 22 and 25 April 1948 and then made a cruise to Terceira, in the Azores, during September and October of that year, to lay a fleet mooring there. She spent much of the year following her return to the eastern seaboard serving as a target ship for submarines and towing targets for surface battle practices. She conducted similar operations in 1950., with time out in June of that year for laying a light indicator net during Operation Martex.

After an overhaul at the Charleston Naval Shipyard (South Carolina) from July to September 1950, Yazoo trained out of Norfolk, Virginia, before she resumed extensive work with nets off Newport. During March 1951, Yazoo took part in U.S. Atlantic Fleet mining exercises out of Key West, Florida, and then spent the remainder of the year performing mine tests and exercises out of Charleston. Between February and April 1952, Yazoo laid nets off Cape Henry during exercises in the Chesapeake Bay.

In January 1953, semi-permanent mine tracks were installed on the net-layer, enabling the ship to lay 24 moored-type naval mines. On 9 January, the ship's home port was changed to, to enable her to commence a schedule of tests and exercises under the auspices of the Operational Development Force.

=== Operation Hardex ===
She participated in Operation Hardex off the Virginia Capes in June and July of that year before she resumed duty out of Key West later that summer. She performed services for the Mine Evaluation Detachment from April to August of the following year and—after salvage operations off Key Largo, Florida—joined in Atlantic Fleet exercises that extended along the eastern seaboard of the United States during October 1954.

=== Operation Canminus ===
Yazoo continued her routine of local operations out of Key West into 1955. During most of March of that year, the ship took part in one of the largest fleet mine exercises ever held. In one phase of the operation, she planted United States Coast Guard buoys marking a channel; and she was one of the final ships to clear the area after the resultant clean-up operation. In April 1955, the ship's home port was again changed—this time back to Charleston—and she took part in a joint United States-Canadian exercise, Operation Canminus in which Yazoo operated as principal minelaying and recovery ship.

During the summer of 1955, Yazoo conducted mine exercises out of Key West, Port Everglades, Florida, and Charleston, South Carolina, with the Atlantic Fleet Mine Force. She spent September and November in company with Orleans Parish and Peregrine, carrying out a special project off the coast of Fedhala, French Morocco, the site of the original American landings in North Africa in November 1942. On her return voyage, Yazoo called at Gibraltar, the Azores, and Bermuda, and reached Charleston on 9 December 1955. She entered the naval shipyard there on 6 January 1956 for an overhaul and, later that spring, carried out refresher training out of Norfolk, Virginia, and two weeks of net-tending training at the Harbor Defense Unit, Little Creek, Virginia.

Yazoo joined Exultant and Fidelity, on 18 June 1956, in carrying out a special mine project off the coast of Charleston and Cape Romain, South Carolina, that lasted until 23 July. After that task, Yazoo again operated out of Key West, providing services to the Mine Warfare Evaluation Detachment in a Mine Force special project.

Later, during Atlantic Fleet mining exercises between 29 October and 24 November, Yazoo laid two large United States Coast Guard buoys; assisted Gwin in establishing a 10-mile (16 km) exercise channel with Coast Guard lighted buoys and dan buoys; laid surface minefields; delivered triangulation data to the umpiring group during aerial minelaying; and participated in the mine recovery and clean-up phase. She then proceeded to Key West, where she conducted a Mine Force special project in company with Observer and Salute.

In the spring of 1957, Yazoo cruised in the Caribbean with the Mine Force and called at San Juan, Puerto Rico; Charlotte Amalie, St. Thomas, Virgin Islands; and Ciudad Trujillo, Dominican Republic. Upon her return to Charleston, the ship carried out several special mine projects in local areas and spent a fortnight operating with the Mine Warfare Evaluation Detachment at Key West. After an overhaul in the Norfolk Naval Shipyard from July to August 1957, Yazoo conducted refresher training out of Charleston and participated in a service mine test.

=== Exercise Sweep Clear III ===
The ship spent the first three weeks of 1958 training with the Harbor Defense Unit at Norfolk before she shifted southward to Charleston to participate in Atlantic Fleet amphibious exercises. During July and August of that year, Yazoo participated in Exercise Sweep Clear III, a NATO minesweeping exercise near Sydney, Nova Scotia. During the cruise—on 26 July 1958—the net layer visited Louisburg, Nova Scotia, and recovered a cannon from a French man-of-war that sank on 26 July 1758—two hundred years earlier!

Following her return to Charleston on 15 August, Yazoo took part in fleet service mine tests and trained foreign mine warfare officers in the Charleston vicinity. She spent the remainder of 1958 in operations out of Charleston and off the Virginia Capes.

=== Exercise Clear Sweep IV ===
Overhauled at the Charleston Naval Shipyard between February and May 1959, Yazoo conducted refresher training and then took part in Exercise Clear Sweep IV off Charleston. Among the ship's duties performed in that vicinity were conducting net training and type training, planting buoys, and laying practice mines for mine warfare schools.

During September 1959, Yazoo carried out sweep gear evaluation for the U.S. Bureau of Ships in the Charleston area before she returned to active operations as a minelaying and recovery unit during Fleet exercises off the Virginia Capes and at Onslow Bay, North Carolina.

Yazoo again took part in amphibious exercises at Onslow Bay in January 1960, before she carried out service mine tests out of Charleston that lasted into the spring. In July 1960, Yazoo received the battle efficiency competition award for the fiscal year 1960.

=== Operation Clear Sweep V ===
That autumn, Yazoo distinguished herself while participating in Operation Clear Sweep V off Nova Scotia. On 12 October, Yazoo received special praise for towing Hummingbird 35 miles to port after that minecraft had suffered a materiel casualty.

Three days later, on 15 October, when the Canadian escort maintenance ship HMCS Cape Scott suffered a casualty, Yazoo came to the rescue and towed the ship out of dangerous waters, saving her from almost certain grounding in the shoals of Shelburne Harbor.

After returning southward, Yazoo underwent a lengthy overhaul at Charleston from November 1960 to February 1961. She operated again with the Mine Force in the Caribbean from February to March 1961, taking part in Fleet amphibious warfare exercises before completing a service mine test off Charleston.

=== Underwater detonation exercises ===
That spring, she again participated in exercises off Charleston with Canadian minesweeping and minelaying units and then underwent harbor net training at Norfolk. In July, Yazoo cruised off the coast of Maine, detonating underwater explosions under the auspices of the Office of Naval Research for the Carnegie Institute of Washington, D.C., and received commendations for a job well done from both agencies.

Yazoo underwent repairs at Charleston from late July 1961 into September, before she resumed her schedule of mining exercises and net training out of Charleston and Norfolk.

=== Post-service inactivation ===
After a year of such duty, she was decommissioned on 28 August 1962. Assigned to the Norfolk group of the Atlantic Reserve Fleet, Yazoo was struck from the Navy List on 1 July 1963 and transferred to the U.S. Maritime Administration (MarAd) for lay up in the James River. She remained in MarAd custody until sometime between 1973 and 1975.
