= USS Cohoes (AN-78) =

History

United States
- Name: USS Cohoes
- Namesake: Cohoes, New York
- Builder: Commercial Iron Works, Portland, Oregon
- Launched: 29 November 1944
- Sponsored by: Mrs. W. W. Johnson
- Commissioned: 23 March 1945
- Decommissioned: 3 September 1947
- Identification: YN-97; AN-78 (20 January 1944)
- Recommissioned: 1968
- Decommissioned: 30 June 1972
- Stricken: 30 June 1972
- Identification: ANL-78
- Honors and awards: Nine campaign stars for Vietnam service
- Fate: Sold for scrapping, 1 February 1973

General characteristics
- Class & type: Cohoes-class net laying ship
- Displacement: 775 tons
- Length: 168 ft 6 in (51.36 m)
- Beam: 33 ft 10 in (10.31 m)
- Draft: 10 ft 10 in (3.30 m)
- Propulsion: Diesel-electric, 2,500 hp (1,900 kW)
- Speed: 12 knots (22 km/h; 14 mph)
- Complement: 46 officers and enlisted
- Armament: 1 x 3 in (76 mm)/50 gun

USS Cohoes (YN-97/AN-78/ANL-78) was a Cohoes-class net laying ship which was assigned to protect United States Navy ships and harbors during World War II with her anti-submarine nets. Her World War II career was short lived; however, she was recommissioned during the Vietnam War where she earned nine campaign stars.

== Construction and career ==
The second ship to be so named by the Navy, Cohoes (AN-78) was launched on 29 November 1944 by Commercial Iron Works, Portland, Oregon; sponsored by Mrs. W. W. Johnson. The ship was commissioned on 23 March 1945 and reported to the U.S. Pacific Fleet.

=== World War II service ===
After training at Pearl Harbor, Cohoes sailed 20 June 1945 for Eniwetok, arriving 2 July. She remained at Eniwetok installing, maintaining, and then removing the net line there until 16 October, when she sailed for Ponape, arriving 18 October to lay a mooring.

In Langar Roads, she salvaged and re-laid a Japanese mooring buoy, and performed similar operations in the Caroline Islands and in the Marshall Islands until 20 November, when she cleared Kwajalein for Pearl Harbor and San Francisco, California, arriving 12 December for duty at Tiburon Net Depot at Tiburon, California.

=== Post-war ===
Cohoes served at Tiburon until 8 April 1946, when she sailed for duty at Astoria, Oregon. She returned to San Francisco 3 September, and remained there until 25 August 1947 when she sailed for San Diego, California, arriving 27 August. There Cohoes was placed out of commission in reserve 3 September 1947.

=== Vietnam War service ===
Cohoes was re-commissioned in 1968 and served in the Vietnam War. The Navy journal (DANFS) is not complete at this date, but other sources indicate that Cohoes was active in the Vietnam area based on the numerous campaign stars she was awarded:

- Vietnamese Counteroffensive - Phase V
- Vietnamese Counteroffensive - Phase VI
- Tet69/Counteroffensive - Phase V
- Vietnam Summer-Fall 1969
- Vietnam Winter-Spring 1970
- Vietnamese Counteroffensive - Phase VII
- Consolidation I
- Consolidation II
- Vietnam Ceasefire

Cohoes was decommissioned and struck from the Naval Register, 30 June 1972.
