= USS Oneota (AN-85) =

History

United States
- Name: Oneota
- Namesake: A tribe of Sioux which occupied lands in what is now Nebraska
- Builder: Marine Iron and Shipbuilding Co., Duluth, Minnesota
- Laid down: 9 February 1944
- Launched: 27 May 1944
- Sponsored by: Mrs. Peter S. Rudie
- Commissioned: 12 March 1945
- Decommissioned: 7 February 1947, at San Diego, California
- Home port: Tiburon, California
- Identification: YN-110; AN-85
- Fate: Laid up in the Pacific Reserve Fleet, San Diego Group; fate unknown

General characteristics
- Class & type: Cohoes-class net laying ship
- Displacement: 775 tons
- Length: 168 ft 6 in (51.36 m)
- Beam: 33 ft 10 in (10.31 m)
- Draft: 10 ft 9 in (3.28 m)
- Propulsion: Diesel-electric, 2,500 hp (1,900 kW)
- Speed: 12 knots (22 km/h; 14 mph)
- Complement: 46 officers and enlisted
- Armament: 1 x 3"/50 caliber gun

USS Oneota (YN-110/AN-85) was a Cohoes-class net laying ship which was assigned to protect United States Navy ships and harbors during World War II with her anti-submarine nets. Her World War II career was short due to the war coming to an end, but she was retained post-war sufficiently long to participate in atomic testing at Bikini Atoll.

== Construction and career ==
The vessel, originally designated YN–110, was laid down 9 February 1944 by the Marine Iron and Shipbuilding Co., Duluth, Minnesota. The ship was renamed Oneota on 26 February 1944 and launched on 27 May 1944; sponsored by Mrs. Peter S. Rudie. The ship was commissioned on 12 March 1945.

=== World War II related service ===
On 10 April 1945 Oneota steamed out into Lake Superior en route to the St. Lawrence River and the Atlantic Ocean. Arriving Boston, Massachusetts, early in May, she remained in southern New England waters for a month, then headed for the Pacific Ocean.

=== Post-war service ===
Between 25 July 1945 and 21 January 1946 she operated along the U.S. West Coast from the Naval Net Depot, Tiburon, California, and on 29 January she arrived at Pearl Harbor for a 2-month stay.

Assigned to Joint Task Unit (JTU) 1.2.7, the salvage group for Operation Crossroads in March, she steamed for Bikini Atoll on 22 March. There, on 2 April, she joined others of her task group in preparing nearby waters for atomic tests Able and Baker. Until July she planted moorings and assisted in the arrangement of target vessels.

Following the tests of 1 and 25 July, she participated in salvage operations and, on 26 August, departed for Kwajalein and Guam. Between 13 September and 15 October she plied between Guam and Rota, then steamed east for the United States.

=== Post-war inactivation ===
After stays at Pearl Harbor and San Francisco, California, she arrived at San Diego, California, 26 January 1947, for inactivation. Decommissioned 6 February, she remained at San Diego as a unit of the Pacific Reserve Fleet until transferred to the U.S. Maritime Administration's National Defense Reserve Fleet and laid up at Suisun Bay 7 November 1962. She was eventually struck from the Navy List (date unknown); her fate is unknown.
