= USS Naubuc (AN-84) =

Tender of the United States Navy

History

United States
- Name: Naubuc
- Namesake: A town in Hartford County, Connecticut
- Builder: Marine Iron and Shipbuilding Company, Duluth, Minnesota
- Laid down: 31 December 1943
- Launched: 15 April 1944
- Sponsored by: Mrs. Harold E. Ford
- Commissioned: 15 March 1945
- Decommissioned: 6 September 1946
- Stricken: 1 September 1962
- Identification: YN-109 (31 December 1943); AN-84 (15 March 1945)
- Stricken: 1 September 1962
- Reinstated: 1 June 1967
- Identification: YRST-4 (March 1968)
- Stricken: 1 September 1975
- Fate: Sold, 1 September 1975, for scrapping

General characteristics
- Class & type: Cohoes-class net laying ship
- Displacement: 775 tons; 873 after conversion
- Length: 168 ft 6 in (51.36 m); 105.5 ft (32.2 m) after conversion
- Beam: 33 ft 10 in (10.31 m)
- Draft: 10 ft 10 in (3.30 m)
- Propulsion: Diesel-electric, 2,500 hp (1,900 kW)
- Speed: 12.3 knots (22.8 km/h; 14.2 mph)
- Complement: 46 officers and enlisted
- Armament: 1 x 3"/50 caliber gun; 4 x 20 mm guns AA gun mounts

USS Naubuc (YN-109/AN-84/YRST-4) was a Cohoes-class net laying ship which was assigned to protect United States Navy ships and harbors during World War II with her anti-submarine nets. Her World War II career was short due to the war coming to an end, and she was inactivated only to be commissioned again some time later as a tender for salvage craft.

== Construction and career ==
The second ship to be so named by the Navy, Naubuc was laid down on 31 December 1943 with the identification number YN–109 by the Marine Iron and Shipbuilding Co., Duluth, Minnesota. The ship was launched on 15 April 1944; sponsored by Mrs. Harold E. Ford; and commissioned on 15 March 1945 with the identification number AN-84.

=== World War II related service ===
Following a delayed shakedown off the U.S. East Coast, Naubuc departed Boston, Massachusetts on 24 April 1945, en route to California. Arriving at San Pedro, California on 7 June, she completed intensive net training drills and headed west, anchoring in Pearl Harbor 17 July.

By 1 August she was at Eniwetok, whence she continued on to the Philippines, performing her specialized services of laying and tending protective nets around ships arid across harbor entrances at Leyte until after the cessation of hostilities. Encoute to CONUS in October, she stopped at Kwajalein and Pearl Harbor, arriving at San Francisco, California, 1 December.

On completion of an abbreviated tour in the Panama Canal Zone, Naubus reported at San Diego, California, 2 January 1946, for duty in the 11th Naval District.

=== Post-war inactivation ===
Ordered to Seattle, Washington, for inactivation the following month, she decommissioned and entered the 19th Fleet, at Astoria, Oregon, 6 September 1946. She remained in the Columbia River Group, Pacific Reserve Fleet, until struck from the Naval Vessel Register 1 September 1962. She was then transferred to the custody of the U.S. Maritime Administration and placed in the National Defense Reserve Fleet.

=== Reinstatement as a tender ===
Reacquired five years later, Naubuc was reinstated to the Naval Vessel Register 1 June 1967 arid scheduled to be converted to a Salvage Craft Tender. In March 1968 she was reclassified (ARST–4) and assigned to the 13th Naval District for conversion.

== Cable laying/implantment vessel ==
During conversion Naubuc was essentially rebuilt. All original propulsion and steering machinery was removed and the ship reequipped for precise navigation and station keeping. Propulsion and steering was by means of four 12-cylinder diesel engines that powered four rotating thrusters mounted on vertical shafts. She was configured as a cable laying and implantment vessel with a cable drum located in the bow along with a cable guide going over the stern. The four thrusters allowed the vessel to stay "on station". When underway, however, only the two bow or stern thrusters were operated at any one time. The vertical thruster shafts increased the vessel's draft significantly. The thrusters were easily damaged by impact with the bottom. The conversion radically changed the outward appearance of the vessel and the length was shortened to 105.5 ft (32.2 m) with 873 tons displacement.

The vessel was put into service by the Military Sealift Command as USNS Naubuc operated under contract with the Navy's Supervisor of Salvage by Merritt Division of Pacific Marine Salvage Company assigned to Naval Underwater Systems Center (NUSC).

Naubuc was assigned to implant and lay cable off Bermuda for the Long Range Acoustic Propagation Project (LRAPP) Test Bed three dimensional suspended array that took place in December 1970. The array reused components of the earlier unsuccessful Sea Spider acoustic experiment array that was attempted in 1969 north of Hawaii in the Pacific. The Bermuda array reused Sea Spider components and was essentially the same trapezoidal taut cable configuration anchored in 14,400 ft (4,389.1 m) of water with the 3,000 ft (914.4 m) horizontal component suspended 3,800 ft (1,158.2 m) below the surface. The Test Bed array was successfully planted but it was not successful due to cable shorts caused by twisting and kinking of the cable to shore.

During the summer of 1971 the vessel supported CURV III in recovery of inoperative underwater acoustic array towers of the Azores Fixed Acoustic Range (AFAR) in the Azores off Santa Maria Island. Naubuc was last used as a support vessel for a cable underwater recovery vehicle in the Tongue of the Ocean, off Andros Island.

== Final decommissioning ==
On 1 September 1975 Naubuc was struck from the Navy List and sold by Navy Sale.
