= Pretzel Park =

Public park in Philadelphia

Coordinates: 40°01′33″N 75°13′16″W

Pretzel Park is a small park in the Manayunk section of Philadelphia, Pennsylvania. It was officially named Manayunk Park from its creation in 1929 until 2004, when it was renamed. However, it has long been referred to as Pretzel Park by residents.

The park contains a partially fenced dog park.

== Etymology ==
The origin of the name Pretzel Park is unclear, though some believe that it is because of the pretzel shape of the walkways running through the park. Others believe that the park took its name because a pretzel vendor used to sell Philly pretzels in the park.

== History ==
On November 28, 2005, a sculpture of a pretzel, about 6 feet tall including the base, was installed in the park.
