= USS Etlah (AN-79) =

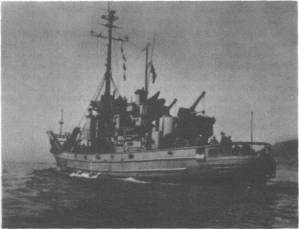
- USS Etlah (AN79)

History

United States
- Name: USS Etlah (YN-98)
- Builder: Commercial Iron Works, Portland, Oregon
- Reclassified: AN-79, January 1944
- Launched: 16 December 1944
- Sponsored by: Mrs. Phyllis I. Kane
- Commissioned: 16 April 1945
- Decommissioned: 14 March 1947
- Recommissioned: 10 August 1951
- Decommissioned: 31 May 1960
- Honors and awards: 2 battle stars (Korea)
- Fate: Transferred to the Dominican Navy, September 1976

Dominican Republic
- Name: Cambiaso (P207)
- Acquired: September 1976
- Fate: Hulked, 1994

General characteristics
- Type: Net laying ship
- Displacement: 785 long tons (798 t)
- Length: 168 ft 6 in (51.36 m)
- Beam: 33 ft 10 in (10.31 m)
- Draft: 10 ft 10 in (3.30 m)
- Propulsion: Diesel-electric, 2,500 hp (1,864 kW)
- Speed: 12 knots (22 km/h; 14 mph)
- Complement: 46
- Armament: 1 × single 3"/50 caliber gun; 6 × single 20 mm AA gun mounts

USS Etlah (YN-98/AN-79) was a Cohoes-class net laying ship built for the United States Navy during World War II. She was commissioned in April 1945 and spent her entire career in the Pacific Ocean. She was decommissioned in March 1947 and placed in reserve. She was recommissioned in August 1951 for Korean War service and remained active until May 1960. She was sold to the Dominican Republic in September 1976 as patrol vessel Cambiaso (P207). By 1994, Cambiaso had been removed from Dominican Navy service and hulked.

== Career ==
Etlah was launched 16 December 1944 by Commercial Iron Works, Portland, Oregon; sponsored by Mrs. Phyllis I. Kane; and commissioned 16 April 1945. ("Etlah" is apparently a native American Indian word meaning "white lily".)

From 8 June 1945 to 26 November, Etlah sailed out of San Pedro, Los Angeles, California, repairing and maintaining antisubmarine nets, and conducting salvage operations in the 11th Naval District. She then served at the Net Depot, Tiburon, California, testing experimental equipment and giving salvage service in the Oakland Estuary. Following World War II. In the spring and summer of 1946, Etlah performed a miscellany of service to Joint Task Force 1, conducting atomic weapons tests at Bikini Atoll in "Operation Crossroads". The net tender was overhauled at Bremerton, Washington that fall, and on 14 March 1947 was placed out of commission in reserve at Astoria, Oregon.

Etlah was recommissioned 10 August 1951, and after shakedown training, sailed for Yokosuka, Japan, arriving 24 December. Through the remainder of her naval career, she served in the Far East. During the Korean War, she maintained the nets guarding Tokyo Bay, and worked on the nets at Pusan Harbor and Cheju, Korea. Towing ships and targets off Japan and in the Philippines, launching and recovering radio-controlled drones in gunnery exercises, and serving as target ship for submarines and surface ships were Etlah's usual employment until 16 February 1960, when she sailed from Yokosuka for Pearl Harbor and San Diego, California, where she was decommissioned 31 May 1960.

Etlah received two battle stars for Korean War service.

The ship was transferred to the Dominican Republic in 1976, and renamed Cambiaso (P-207). She was decommissioned from Dominican Navy service in the early 1990s, and reduced to a hulk by 1994.
