= USS Shakamaxon (AN-88) =

US Navy ship

History

United States
- Name: Shakamaxon
- Namesake: Shackamaxon
- Builder: Leathem D. Smith Shipbuilding Company
- Laid down: 30 June 1944 as (YN-114)
- Launched: 9 September 1944
- Sponsored by: Mrs. Theodore E. Layman
- Commissioned: 5 May 1945
- Decommissioned: 21 April 1947
- Stricken: 1 July 1963
- Home port: Tiburon, California
- Identification: YN-114; AN-88 (17 January 1945); IMO number: 7338250
- Fate: Reacquired by the Navy in 1968 and transferred to the U.S. Department of the Interior

General characteristics
- Class & type: Cohoes-class net laying ship
- Displacement: 775 tons
- Length: 168 ft 6 in (51.36 m)
- Beam: 33 ft 10 in (10.31 m)
- Draft: 10 ft 9 in (3.28 m)
- Propulsion: Diesel direct drive, 2,500 hp (1,900 kW), single propeller
- Speed: 12 knots (22 km/h; 14 mph)
- Complement: 46 officers and enlisted
- Armament: 1 x 3"/50 caliber gun; 4 x single 20 mm gun mounts

USS Passaconaway (YN-114/AN-86) – sometimes called USS Skakamaxon -- was a Cohoes-class net laying ship which was assigned to protect United States Navy ships and harbors during World War II with her anti-submarine nets. Her World War II career was short due to the war coming to an end, but, post-war, she continued salvage operations, including those at Bikini Atoll, before being struck from the Navy in 1947.

== Construction and career ==
Shakamaxon (AN-88) was laid down on 30 June 1944 by the Leathem D. Smith Shipbuilding Company, of Sturgeon Bay, Wisconsin; launched on 9 September 1944; sponsored by Mrs. Theodore E. Layman; and commissioned on 5 April 1945.

=== World War II service ===
Shakamaxon completed fitting out at the Boston Navy Yard, then conducted shakedown off the New England coast before commencing post-shakedown availability at Boston, Massachusetts. The auxiliary net-laying ship was assigned to the U.S. Pacific Fleet for duty in July 1945.

=== Post-war service ===
By March 1946, she was at Guam in the Mariana Islands and, from there, moved to Bikini Atoll in the Marshall Islands for Operation Crossroads, the atomic bomb tests. She remained at Bikini from 25 May until 23 July, when she put to sea.

Shakamaxon arrived at Kwajalein on 28 August and stayed until early September. She put to sea again for a time and then made for Guam on 13 September. She made a trip to Tinian on that date and returned to Guam, where she remained until 14 October. Shakamaxon arrived in Pearl Harbor on 29 October and did not depart until 16 January 1947.

=== Inactivation ===
From there, she voyaged to San Diego, California, for inactivation overhaul. On 21 April 1947, the auxiliary net-laying ship entered the Pacific Reserve Fleet at San Diego. She remained out of commission, in reserve, until 1 July 1963 when her name was struck from the Naval Vessel Register and transferred to the U.S. Maritime Administration for lay-up.

=== Transfer to the Department of the Interior ===
She was reacquired in 1968 and transferred to the U.S. Department of Interior, for which she served as a cargo carrier in Micronesia. Her ultimate fate is unknown.
