= USS Manayunk (AN-81) =

History

United States
- Name: USS Manayunk
- Namesake: Manayunk, Philadelphia, Pennsylvania
- Builder: Commercial Iron Works, Portland, Oregon
- Laid down: 18 December 1944
- Launched: 30 March 1945
- Sponsored by: Mrs. Bryan Wallace Strong
- Commissioned: 25 May 1945
- Decommissioned: 19 July 1946, at Astoria, Oregon
- Stricken: September 1962
- Identification: YN-100 (18 December 1944); AN-81 (17 January 1945)
- Fate: Transferred to MARAD in June 1961; fate unknown

General characteristics
- Class & type: Cohoes-class net laying ship
- Displacement: 775 tons
- Length: 168 ft 6 in (51.36 m)
- Beam: 33 ft 10 in (10.31 m)
- Draft: 10 ft 10 in (3.30 m)
- Propulsion: Diesel electric, 2,500 hp (1,900 kW)
- Speed: 12.3 knots (22.8 km/h; 14.2 mph)
- Complement: 46 officers and enlisted
- Armament: 1 x 3 in (76 mm)/50 gun; 4 x single 20 mm cannons

USS Manayunk (YN-100/AN-81) was a Cohoes-class net laying ship which was assigned to protect United States Navy ships and harbors during World War II with her anti-submarine nets. Her World War II career was short lived as the war was ending, and she was placed in reserve and eventually struck by the Navy.

== Construction and career ==
The second ship to be so named by the Navy, Manayunk was laid down with the hull identification number YN-100 by the Commercial Iron Works, Portland, Oregon on 18 December 1944. The ship redesignated AN-81 on 17 January 1945 and launched on 30 March 1945; sponsored by Mrs. Bryan Wallace Strong. Manayunk was commissioned on 25 May 1945.

=== World War II related service ===
Following shakedown and training, Manayunk steamed for the central Pacific Ocean for duty with Minecraft, Pacific Fleet. She operated in the Mariana Islands, primarily in the Saipan-Tinian area, laying and maintaining nets and moorings until the spring of 1946.

=== Post-war inactivation ===
On 3 May, she departed Saipan for Pearl Harbor and the U.S. West Coast. Arriving at Astoria, Oregon, 2 June, she decommissioned 19 July and was placed in reserve. The ship remained a unit of the 19th Fleet until June 1961 when she was transferred to the U.S. Maritime Administration and placed in the National Defense Reserve Fleet.

She continued to be listed as Navy-owned until formally turned over to the U.S. Maritime Administration in September 1962 at Olympia, Washington.

Manayunk remained a unit of the MARAD Reserve Fleet at Olympia. She was struck from the Navy list in September 1962; her fate is unknown.
