= USS Tunxis (AN-90) =

History

United States
- Name: Tunxis
- Namesake: Tunxis
- Builder: Zenith Dredge Company, Duluth, Minnesota
- Laid down: 2 May 1944
- Launched: 18 August 1944
- Sponsored by: Mrs. Edward J. Thye, wife of the Governor of Minnesota
- Commissioned: 28 March 1945
- Decommissioned: 30 June 1945
- Recommissioned: 20 February 1953
- Decommissioned: 20 July 1955
- Home port: Melville, Rhode Island and Tiburon, California
- Identification: YN-119; AN-90 (17 January 1944)
- Fate: Transferred to Venezuela

Venezuela
- Name: Puerto Nutrias
- Identification: H-02

General characteristics
- Class & type: Cohoes-class net laying ship
- Displacement: 775 tons
- Length: 168 ft 6 in (51.36 m)
- Beam: 33 ft 10 in (10.31 m)
- Draft: 10 ft 9 in (3.28 m)
- Propulsion: Diesel direct drive, 2,500 hp (1,900 kW), single propeller
- Speed: 12 knots (22 km/h; 14 mph)
- Complement: 46 officers and enlisted
- Armament: 1 x 3"/50 caliber gun

USS Tunxis (YN-119/AN-90) was a Cohoes-class net laying ship which was assigned to protect United States Navy ships and harbors during World War II with her anti-submarine nets. Her World War II career was cut short due to the war coming to an end, but, post-war, she was reactivated and served the Navy until she was put into reserve and eventually transferred to Venezuela as Puerto Nutrias.

== Construction and career ==
The second ship to be so named by the Navy, Tunxis—originally projected as YN-119—was redesignated AN-90 on 17 January 1944; laid down on 2 May 1944, at Duluth, Minnesota, by the Zenith Dredge Co.; launched on 18 August 1944; sponsored by Mrs. Edward J. Thye, wife of the Governor of Minnesota; and commissioned on 28 March 1945.

=== World War II related service ===
Tunxis remained in commission with the Navy for only several months as the war was coming to an end. She was then decommissioned on 30 June 1945, and the net tender was placed in reserve.

=== Post-war reactivation ===
Tunxis remained in reserve until activated on 20 February 1953. Originally operating out of the 5th Naval District, she was transferred to the 6th Naval District on 4 January 1954 and based at Charleston, South Carolina; Savannah, Georgia; and at Key West, Florida. Tunxis participated in U.S. Atlantic Fleet exercises off the U.S. East Coast from 13 to 22 November 1954 before returning to Charleston.

=== Final decommissioning ===
On 15 April 1955, the ship was placed "in commission in reserve" before being decommissioned on 20 July of that year. In August 1963, Tunxis was transferred under the Military Assistance Program to the government of Venezuela. She served the Venezuelan Navy as Puerto Nutrias (H-02). Her current fate is unknown.
