= USS Marietta (AN-82) =

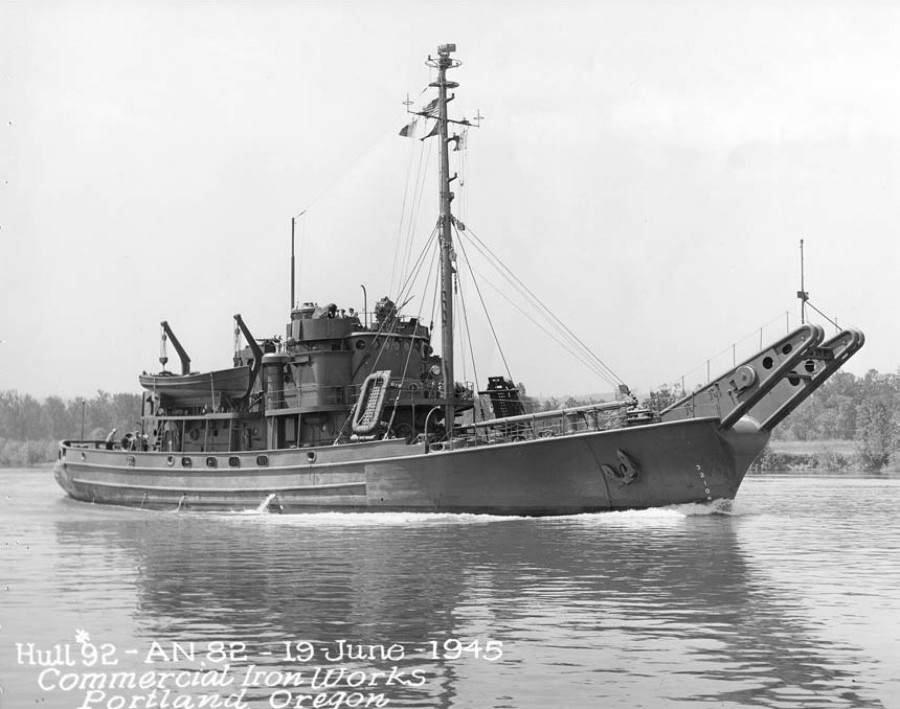
- Marietta near Portland, Oregon, 19 June 1945

History

United States
- Name: USS Marietta
- Namesake: Cities in Ohio and Georgia
- Builder: Commercial Iron Works, Portland, Oregon
- Laid down: 17 February 1945
- Launched: 27 April 1945
- Sponsored by: Mrs. Theodore C. Lyster, Jr.
- Commissioned: 22 June 1945
- Recommissioned: 14 February 1952
- Decommissioned: 21 December 1959
- Identification: YN-101; AN-82
- Fate: transferred to Venezuela February 1962

Venezuela
- Name: Puerto Santo
- Acquired: February 1962
- Identification: H-03

General characteristics
- Class & type: Cohoes-class net laying ship
- Displacement: 775 tons
- Length: 168 ft 6 in (51.36 m)
- Beam: 33 ft 10 in (10.31 m)
- Draft: 10 ft 10 in (3.30 m)
- Propulsion: Diesel electric, 2,500 hp (1,900 kW)
- Speed: 12.3 knots (22.8 km/h; 14.2 mph)
- Complement: 46
- Armament: 1 x 3 in (76 mm)/50 gun; 4 x single 20 mm cannons

USS Marietta (YN-101/AN-82) was a Cohoes-class net laying ship commissioned at the end of World War II. Post-war she was deactivated, but then recommissioned during the Korean War era. After that service, she was struck from the Navy List and transferred to the Venezuelan Navy in 1962.

== Construction and career ==
Marietta was laid down by the Commercial Iron Works, Portland, Oregon on 17 February 1945. The ship was launched on 27 April 1945; sponsored by Mrs. Theodore C. Lyster Jr., and commissioned 22 June 1945, Lt. Richard Haber, USNR, commanding.

=== World War II related service ===
Following shakedown, Marietta was briefly ordered to San Francisco, California, where she spent two weeks removing the protective nets in that harbor, 14 August to 3 September 1945. She then sailed for Norfolk, Virginia, via the Panama Canal. Reporting to ComServLant 30 October, she immediately began installing moorings for the growing Inactive Fleet.

On 1 February 1946 the netlayer headed for Miami, Florida, and for the next eleven weeks operated with the Hydrographic Office in a series of triangulation surveys of the east coast of Florida and the Bahamas. Marietta next steamed for New Orleans, Louisiana, arriving 25 April, and continuing on to Orange, Texas, 11 May. At Orange she entered the Atlantic Reserve Fleet and decommissioned 19 March 1947.

=== Korean War era service ===
Five years later, 14 February 1952, Marietta recommissioned. Assigned to harbor defense in the 3d Naval District, she was based at Naval Air Station (NAS) Brooklyn, New York, for almost eight years. During that time she tended nets, moorings, and buoys in New York, New Jersey, Connecticut, and Rhode Island, with periodic deployment to other ports on the U.S. East Coast, including Key West, Florida, Charleston, South Carolina, Norfolk, Virginia, Boston, Massachusetts, and, Guantanamo Bay, Cuba.

=== Inactivation ===
On 21 October 1959, following operations with the Naval Amphibious Base, Little Creek, Virginia, Marietta entered the New York Naval Shipyard for inactivation. She decommissioned 21 December at Bayonne, New Jersey, and reentered the Atlantic Reserve Fleet.

=== Transferred to Venezuela ===
Two years later preparations were started for Marietta's eventual transfer under the terms of the Military Assistance Program. In February 1962 she was put in the custody of the Venezuelan government, for whom she has operated, with the name Puerto Santo (H 03). Her ultimate fate is unknown.
