= USS Passaconaway (AN-86) =

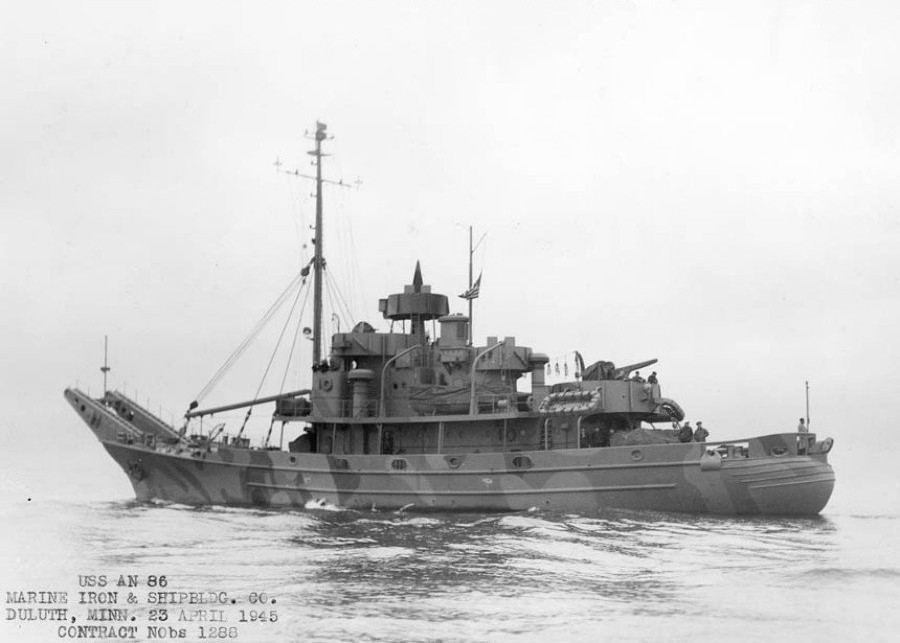
- Passaconaway photographed by her builders, 23 April 1945

History

United States
- Name: Passaconaway
- Namesake: Passaconaway
- Builder: Marine Iron and Shipbuilding Co., Duluth, Minnesota
- Laid down: 15 April 1944
- Launched: 30 June 1944
- Sponsored by: Miss Elizabeth Jayne Hughes
- Commissioned: 27 April 1945
- Decommissioned: December 1946, at San Diego, California
- Identification: YN-111; AN-86 (January 1944)
- Fate: transferred to the Dominican Navy, September 1976

Dominican Republic
- Name: Separación
- Acquired: September 1976
- Identification: P208
- Status: in active service, as of 2007

General characteristics
- Class & type: Cohoes-class net laying ship
- Displacement: 775 tons
- Length: 168 ft 6 in (51.36 m)
- Beam: 33 ft 10 in (10.31 m)
- Draft: 10 ft 9 in (3.28 m)
- Propulsion: Diesel-electric, 2,500 hp (1,900 kW)
- Speed: 12 knots (22 km/h; 14 mph)
- Complement: 46 officers and enlisted
- Armament: 1 x 3"/50 caliber gun; 3 x single 20 mm gun mounts

USS Passaconaway (YN-111/AN-86) was a Cohoes-class net laying ship built for the United States Navy during World War II. She was commissioned in April 1945 and spent her entire career in the Pacific Ocean. She was decommissioned in December 1946 and placed in reserve. She was sold to the Dominican Republic in September 1976 as patrol vessel Separación (P208). As of 2007, Separación remained active in the Dominican Navy.

== Career ==
Passaconaway (AN–86), The second ship to be so named by the Navy, authorized as YN-111, was laid down 15 April 1944 by Marine Iron and Shipbuilding Co., Duluth, Minnesota; launched 30 June 1944, sponsored by Miss Elizabeth Jayne Hughes; commissioned 27 April 1945.

Following shakedown, Passaconaway transited the Panama Canal and served with ServRon 4 during the later stages of World War II. She tended anti-submarine nets in the Admiralty Islands during the summer of 1945, then for the next 12 months was engaged throughout the Western Pacific Ocean in other operations common to her type. She laid channel buoys in the Caroline Islands, conducted salvage operations and set mooring buoys in the Mariana Islands, and assisted other ships in supplying Marcus Island and Iwo Jima. Following a brush with a typhoon in the spring of 1946, she was ordered to Pearl Harbor for repairs after which she returned to San Diego, California, where she decommissioned in December.

Passaconaway was transferred to the U.S. Maritime Administration in October 1962 as a part of the National Defense Reserve Fleet at Suisun Bay, California, until being transferred to MARAD National Defense Reserve Fleet, Suisun Bay, Benicia, California, in October 1970. Passaconaway was transferred to the Dominican Republic in September 1976 as patrol vessel Separación (P208). As of 2007, the ship remained in active service with the Dominican Navy.
