= USS Skirmish =

Minesweeper of the United States Navy

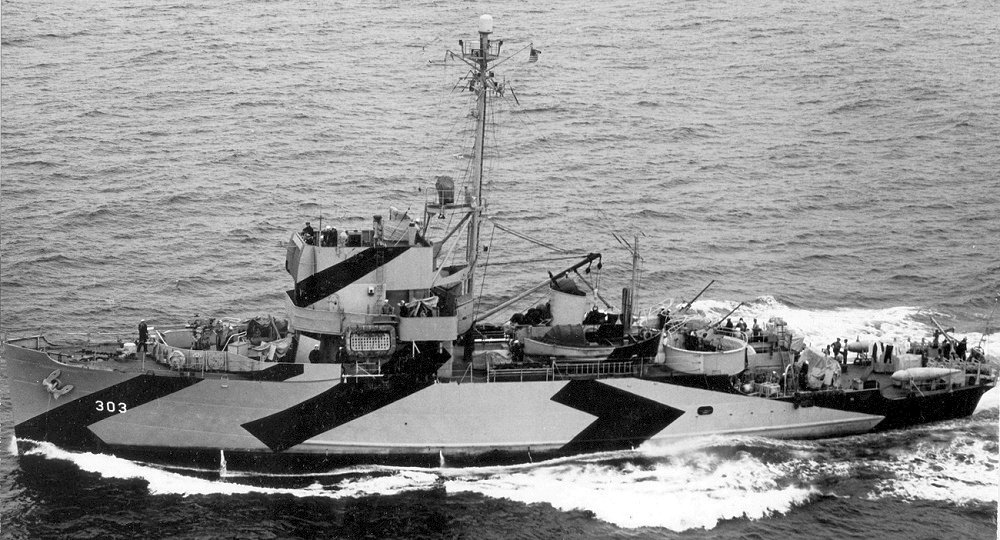
- Skirmish underway off San Pedro, California on 2 September 1944

History

United States
- Name: USS Skirmish (AM-303)
- Builder: Associated Shipbuilders, Seattle, Washington
- Laid down: 8 April 1943
- Launched: 16 August 1943
- Commissioned: 30 June 1944
- Decommissioned: December 1945
- Reclassified: MSF-303, 7 February 1955
- Stricken: 1 January 1965
- Fate: Transferred to Dominican Republic, 14 January 1965

History

Dominican Republic
- Name: Separación (BM454)
- Acquired: 14 January 1965
- Renamed: Prestol Botello, 1976
- Refit: 1995
- Reclassified: C454, 1995
- Fate: in active service, as of 2007

General characteristics
- Class & type: Admirable-class minesweeper
- Displacement: 650 tons; 945 tons (full load)
- Length: 184 ft 6 in (56.24 m)
- Beam: 33 ft (10 m)
- Draft: 9 ft 9 in (2.97 m)
- Propulsion: 2 × ALCO 539 diesel engines, 1,710 shp (1.3 MW); Farrel-Birmingham single reduction gear; 2 shafts
- Speed: 14.8 knots (27.4 km/h)
- Complement: 104
- Armament: 1 × 3"/50 caliber gun; 2 × twin Bofors 40 mm gun; 1 × Hedgehog anti-submarine mortar; 2 × Depth charge tracks

Service record
- Part of: US Pacific Fleet (1944-1946); Atlantic Reserve Fleet (1946-1965); Dominican Navy (1965-)
- Operations: Battle of Iwo Jima; Battle of Okinawa
- Awards: 4 Battle stars

USS Skirmish (AM-303) was an Admirable-class minesweeper built for the United States Navy during World War II. She received four battle stars during World War II. She was decommissioned in December 1945 and placed in reserve. In February 1955, while still in reserve, her hull number was changed from AM-303 to MSF-303, but she was not reactivated. She was transferred to the Dominican Republic in January 1965 and renamed Separación (BM455). She was employed as a patrol vessel in Dominican Navy service and renamed Prestol Botello in 1976. Her pennant number was changed from BM454 to C454 during a 1995 refit. As of 2007, Prestol Botello remained in active service for the Dominican Navy.

== U.S. Navy service ==
Skirmish was laid down on 8 April 1943 by Associated Shipbuilders of Harbor Island, Seattle, Washington; launched on 16 August 1943; and commissioned on 30 June 1944. After completing fitting out and trials in the Seattle area and shakedown and anti-submarine warfare training out of San Pedro, California, and San Diego, California, respectively, Skirmish departed the west coast on 2 September 1944. The minesweeper escorted a convoy to Pearl Harbor, Hawaii, arriving on 9 September.

After 20 days of minesweeping and antisubmarine drills in the Hawaiian Islands, Skirmish stood out of Pearl Harbor to escort USS Boreas (AF-8) to Eniwetok Atoll in the Marshall Islands. The two ships arrived on 12 October, and Skirmish departed the next day to return to Pearl Harbor. Upon her return, on 20 October, she resumed training exercise around Oahu until 3 November when she formed up with a San Francisco-bound convoy. She stayed in San Francisco for a week from 14 to 21 November, visited Los Angeles, California, from the 21st to the 23d, and returned to Pearl Harbor on 3 December. On 12 December, Comdr. L. F. Freeburghouse broke his pennant in Skirmish, and she became the flagship of the Commander, Mine Squadron 12.

Following a yard overhaul and more exercises Skirmish departed the Hawaiian Islands on 22 January 1945 in the screen of another Eniwetok-bound convoy, arriving on 4 February. This time she did not return to Pearl Harbor. Instead, she departed Eniwetok the next day in company with a large contingent of landing craft, escort ships, and minesweepers. Sailing by way of Saipan and Tinian in the Marianas, Skirmish arrived off Iwo Jima, in the Volcano Islands, on 16 February. For the next three days, she and the other minesweepers conducted sweeps. Then, after the assault on 19 February, she remained in the area on the "ping line" to give advance warning of air attack or submarines. On 8 March, she cleared Iwo Jima for Ulithi Atoll in the Carolines, arriving on 10 March and remaining until the 19th.

On 25 March, Skirmish arrived off Okinawa, the major island of the Ryukyus, and commenced sweeping the waters around the island. During the evening of the following day, an enemy "Betty" swooped in on her port side, firing as it closed. Up went the cry, "Action to port," as all guns blazed away at the intruder. As the twin-engine bomber passed over her bow, Skirmish's fusillade ripped into its engines, causing a storm of parts to rain down on her forecastle deck. The "Betty" continued across the bow and splashed to starboard. The minesweeper continued to patrol and sweep around Okinawa until 8 July, putting into port periodically at either Buckner Bay or Kerama Retto. From 26 March on, action was not so close as on that date, but Skirmish's crew continued to fight off air attacks and sweep mines. She suffered her only casualty of the war at Okinawa on 2 April, when a dud crashed into a 20 millimeter gun mount, demolishing it and killing one sailor.

On 8 July, Skirmish sailed from Okinawa for San Pedro Bay area of Leyte Gulf. She was still at Leyte on 10 August when the news of the Japanese surrender offer came. The whole bay exploded into one gigantic 4th-of-July celebration - searchlights blazing, sirens screaming and fireworks going off everywhere. By the 18th, everyone settled down with the realization that there was much to be done in spite of the cessation of hostilities.

Accordingly, Skirmish got underway with the other minesweepers on 18 August to return to Buckner Bay. She stayed at Okinawa for a week and a day, from 22 to 30 August, then departed to sweep the Yellow Sea in support of the Korea occupation forces. From 1 to 7 September, she swept in the area of the Korean coast then headed for Sasebo, Japan, where she swept the approaches to Sasebo and Nagasaki. During the ensuing three months she continued operations around Kyūshū, departing that area once to sweep a shallow field in the Tsushima Strait.

On 11 December, Skirmish hoisted her homeward bound pennant and led Mine Squadron 12 in review before Rear Admiral Struble, Commander, Minecraft Pacific Fleet. As they sailed out of Sasebo, the ships assembled in the harbor rendered honors, and the crews of two cruisers, USS Boston (CL-69) and USS Oklahoma City (CL-90) were paraded in dress blues.

Upon arrival in the United States later in December, Skirmish was placed out of commission, in reserve, and berthed at Orange, Texas. She remained there for the next 19 years. She was redesignated MSF-303 on 11 February 1955 and declared excess to the needs of the Navy in January 1965. Her name was struck from the Navy list in January 1965, and she was sold to the Dominican Republic on 14 January, under the terms of the Military Assistance Program.

=== Awards ===
Skirmish earned four battle stars for World War II service.

== Dominican Navy service ==
The former Skirmish was acquired by the Dominican Republic on 14 January 1965 and renamed Separación (BM454). Employed as a patrol vessel in Dominican Navy service, she was renamed Prestol Botello in 1976. During a 1995 refit, her pennant number was changed to C454 in 1995. As of 2007, Prestol Botello was in active service with the Dominican Navy.
