= Cohoes-class net laying ship =

Net laying ship class

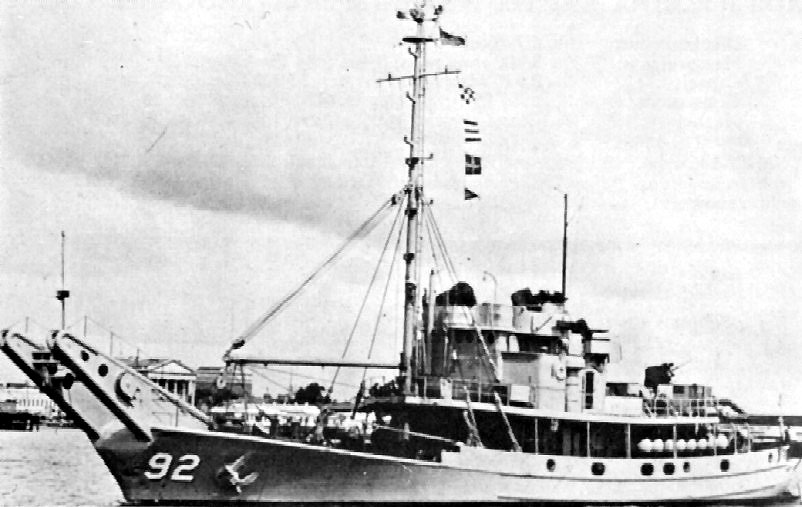
- :USS Yazoo (AN-92) USS Yazoo, last ship of the class

Class overview
- Builders: Commercial Iron Works, Portland, Oregon (6); Marine Iron and Shipbuilding Company, Duluth, Minnesota (3); Leathem D. Smith Shipbuilding Company, Sturgeon Bay, Wisconsin (3); Zenith Dredge Company, Duluth, Minnesota (3)
- Operators: United States Navy (15)
- Preceded by: Ailanthus class
- Built: 1944–1945
- Completed: 15

General characteristics
- Type: Net laying ship
- Displacement: 775 tons
- Length: 168 ft 6 in (51.36 m)
- Beam: 33 ft 10 in (10.31 m)
- Draft: 10 ft 9 in (3.28 m)
- Propulsion: Busch-Sulzer 539 diesel electric, Westinghouse single reduction gears, 1,200 hp (890 kW), single propeller
- Speed: 12 knots (22 km/h; 14 mph)
- Complement: 46 officers and enlisted
- Armament: 3"/50 caliber gun

The Cohoes-class net laying ships consisted of fifteen steel hull ships built near the end of World War II for the United States Navy, the last being commissioned shortly after war's end. They were similar in appearance and construction to the predecessor Aloe class, with slight differences in dimensions and displacement. Unlike previous net-laying classes, names were taken from a variety of place names, rather than from plants. All but two were decommissioned and put into reserve by the end of 1947, but most were reactivated at various times in the early 1950s and remained active until the early 1960s, when seven were transferred through lease or sale to several foreign navies. Two were transferred to other federal agencies; two were reactivated in the late 1960s and these served into the 1970s. Some of those transferred abroad were still active as late as 2007; none were lost in action.

== Class members ==
Name	Hull	Builder	Launched	Decommissioned	Fate
USS Cohoes	YN-97; AN-78	Commercial Iron Works	November 29, 1944	September 3, 1947	recommissioned 1968; struck June 30, 1972
USS Etlah	YN-98; AN-79	Commercial Iron Works	December 16, 1944	March 14, 1947	recommissioned August 10, 1951; Decommissioned May 31, 1960
USS Suncook	YN-99; AN-80	Commercial Iron Works	February 16, 1945	June 12, 1947	transferred to Bureau of Mines in 1962 via MARAD; sold for scrap July 28, 1971
USS Manayunk	YN-100; AN-81	Commercial Iron Works	March 30, 1945	July 19, 1946	transferred to MARAD 1962; ultimate fate unknown
USS Marietta	YN-101; AN-82	Commercial Iron Works	April 27, 1945		Recommissioned February 14, 1952; Decommissioned December 21, 1959; transferred to Venezuelan Navy Feb 1962
USS Nahant	YN-102; AN-83	Commercial Iron Works	June 30, 1945	July 31, 1946	Recommissioned February 14, 1952; Decommissioned September 30, 1968; sold to Uruguayan Navy October 15, 1968
USS Naubuc	YN-109; AN-84	Marine Iron & Shipbuilding, Duluth, Minnesota	April 15, 1944	September 6, 1946	reinstated June 1, 1967, as ARST-4; sold September 1, 1975, for scrap
USS Oneota	YN-110; AN-85	Marine Iron & Shipbuilding, Duluth, Minnesota	May 27, 1944	February 7, 1947	fate unknown
USS Passaconaway	YN-111; AN-86	Marine Iron & Shipbuilding, Duluth, Minnesota	June 30, 1944	Dec 1946	transferred to Dominican Navy Sep 1976
USS Passaic	YN-113; AN-87	Leathem D. Smith Shipbuilding Company	June 29, 1944	Mar 1947	transferred to Dominican Navy Sep 1976
USS Shakamaxon	YN-114; AN-88	Leathem D. Smith Shipbuilding Company	September 9, 1944	April 21, 1947	in reserve until 1968 when transferred to Department of the Interior; ultimate disposition unknown
USS Tonawanda	YN-115; AN-89	Leathem D. Smith Shipbuilding Company	November 14, 1944	August 9, 1946	Recommissioned March 18, 1952; Decommissioned December 18, 1959; leased to Haiti May 25, 1960, and sold outright in 1979; ultimate fate unknown
USS Tunxis	YN-119; AN-90	Zenith Dredge Company. Duluth, Minnesota	August 18, 1944	June 30, 1945	Recommissioned February 20, 1953; Decommissioned July 20, 1955; transferred to Venezuela Aug 1963; ultimate fate unknown
USS Waxsaw	YN-120; AN-91	Zenith Dredge Company. Duluth, Minnesota	September 15, 1944	March 23, 1960	transferred to Venezuela Oct 1963 and sold outright 1977
USS Yazoo	YN-121; AN-92	Zenith Dredge Company. Duluth, Minnesota	October 18, 1944	August 28, 1962	scrapped 1975
