= USS R-10 =

R-class submarine of the United States

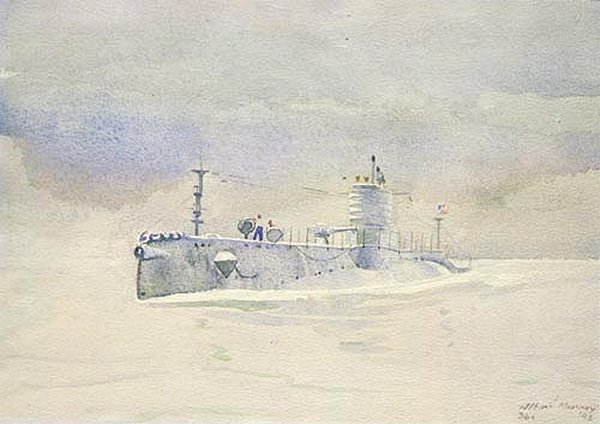
- 1940s watercolor painting "Submarine R-10 (SS-87) Saint Thomas, Virgin Islands" by Albert K. Murray

History

United States
- Name: R-10
- Ordered: 29 August 1916
- Builder: Fore River Shipbuilding Company, Quincy, Massachusetts
- Cost: $648,376.81 (hull and machinery)
- Laid down: 21 March 1918
- Launched: 28 June 1919
- Sponsored by: Mrs. Mary Ransom
- Commissioned: 20 August 1919
- Decommissioned: 14 September 1945
- Stricken: 18 June 1945
- Identification: Hull symbol: SS-87 (17 July 1920); Call sign: NILP
- Fate: Sold for scrap, 22 January 1946

General characteristics
- Class & type: R-1-class submarine
- Displacement: 574 long tons (583 t) surfaced; 685 long tons (696 t) submerged
- Length: 186 feet 3 inches (56.77 m)
- Beam: 18 ft (5.5 m)
- Draft: 15 ft 6 in (4.72 m)
- Installed power: 880 brake horsepower (656 kW) diesel; 934 hp (696 kW) electric
- Propulsion: 2 × NELSECO 6-EB-14 diesel engines; 2 × Electro-Dynamic Company electric motors; 2 × 60-cell batteries; 2 × Propellers
- Speed: 12.5 knots (23.2 km/h; 14.4 mph) surfaced; 9.3 kn (17.2 km/h; 10.7 mph) submerged
- Range: 4,700 nautical miles (8,700 km; 5,400 mi) at 6.2 kn (11.5 km/h; 7.1 mph), 7,000 nmi (13,000 km; 8,100 mi) if fuel loaded into the main ballast tanks
- Test depth: 200 ft (61 m)
- Capacity: 18,880 US gallons (71,500 L; 15,720 imp gal) fuel
- Complement: 2 officers; 27 enlisted
- Armament: 4 × 21-inch (533 mm) torpedo tubes (8 torpedoes); 1 × 3-inch (76 mm)/50-caliber deck gun

USS R-10 (SS-87), also known as "Submarine No. 87", was an R-1-class coastal and harbor defense submarines of the United States Navy commissioned after the end of World War I.

Due to space constraints, the boats built at the Fore River Shipbuilding Company yard, were laid down much later than the boats built at the Union Iron Works and the Lake Torpedo Boat Company yards. Because of this, none were commissioned before the end of WWI.

== Design ==
The R-boats built by the Fore River Shipbuilding Company, R-1 through R-14, and the Union Iron Works, R-15 through R-20, are sometimes considered a separate class, R-1-class, from those built by the Lake Torpedo Boat Company, R-21 through R-27, R-21-class.

The submarines had a length of 186 feet 3 inches (56.8 m) overall, a beam of 18 ft (5.5 m), and a mean draft of 15 ft 6 in (4.7 m). They displaced 574 long tons (583 t) on the surface and 685 long tons (696 t) submerged. The R-1-class submarines had a crew of 2 officers and 27 enlisted men. They had a diving depth of 200 ft (61.0 m).

For surface running, the boats were powered by two 440-brake-horsepower (328 kW) NELSECO 6-EB-14 diesel engines, each driving one propeller shaft. When submerged each propeller was driven by a 467-horsepower (348 kW) Electro-Dynamic Company electric motor. They could reach 12.5 knots (23.2 km/h; 14.4 mph) on the surface and 9.3 kn (17.2 km/h; 10.7 mph) underwater. On the surface, the R-1-class had a range of 4,700 nautical miles (8,700 km; 5,400 mi) at 6.2 kn (11.5 km/h; 7.1 mph), or 7,000 nmi (13,000 km; 8,100 mi) if fuel was loaded into their main ballast tanks.

The boats were armed with four 21-inch (533 mm) torpedo tubes in the bow. They carried four reloads, for a total of eight torpedoes. The R-1-class submarines were also armed with a single 3 in (76 mm)/50 caliber deck gun.

== Construction ==
R-10's keel was laid down on 21 March 1918, by the Fore River Shipbuilding Company, Quincy, Massachusetts. She was launched on 28 June 1919, sponsored by Mrs. Mary Ransom, and commissioned on 20 August 1919.

== Service history ==
=== 1919–1930 ===
R-10 fitted out at the Boston Navy Yard, during the fall of 1919, she joined Submarine Division 9, with the new year, 1920, and departed for winter maneuvers in the Gulf of Mexico, on 15 January. Based at Pensacola, Florida, she completed final trials during March, and in mid-April, returned to New England. On 18 May 1920, she arrived at Newport, Rhode Island.

When the US Navy adopted its hull classification system on 17 July 1920, she received the hull number SS-87.

R-10 operated out of Newport, and New London, Connecticut. With the fall she proceeded south again, underwent overhaul at Norfolk, Virginia, remaining until April 1921. She then headed for the Panama Canal, and duty in the Pacific.

R-10 arrived at San Pedro, California, on 30 June, for a two-year tour. Toward the end of September, she added salvage operations to her record as she assisted the minesweeper Cardinal, in raising R-10's sister boat R-6, from the bottom of San Pedro Harbor, on 13 October, then resumed individual and squadron exercises.

In July 1923, R-10 shifted to Pearl Harbor, where for the next seven and a half years she conducted training operations, including fleet problems, made occasional runs as far west as Midway Island, and as far east as the West Coast, and participated in air-sea rescue operations for planes initiating transpacific air travel. Ordered back to the Atlantic, in 1930, R-10 cleared Pearl Harbor, for the last time, on 12 December.

=== 1931–1939 ===
On 9 February 1931, R-10 arrived at New London, and assumed training duties for the Submarine School there. During the spring, she underwent overhaul at Portsmouth, New Hampshire, and in the summer added anti-submarine warfare (ASW) destroyer training, and NROTC cruises, to her mission. Through the decade she continued her role as a training submarine, and operated primarily off the New England coast, with occasional temporary duty at stations on the mid-Atlantic seaboard, including the Diving School, at Piney Point, Maryland, in May 1937.

=== 1940–1946 ===
In September 1940, R-10 participated in Bureau of Ordnance tests at Norfolk, then returned to New London. The following year she was transferred to Key West, Florida. From 1941, until the winter of 1943, she alternated patrols in the Yucatán Channel and the Florida Straits, with operations for the Fleet Sonar School, at Key West. Then, for the remainder of World War II, she concentrated on training duties. During February, and into March 1945, she operated out of Port Everglades, Florida, then returned to Key West, where she remained until 4 June.

== Fate ==
R-10 headed north for the Philadelphia Navy Yard, on 4 June 1945, and inactivation. Arriving on 8 June, she decommissioned on 18 June, and was struck from the Naval Vessel Register on 11 July. In January 1946, she was sold for scrap to the North American Smelting Company, in Philadelphia.

== Awards ==
- American Defense Service Medal with "Fleet" clasp
- American Campaign Medal
- World War II Victory Medal

== Bibliography ==
- "Table 21 - Ships on Navy List June 30, 1919". Congressional Serial Set. U.S. Government Printing Office: 770. 1921.
- Friedman, Norman (1995). U.S. Submarines Through 1945: An Illustrated Design History. Annapolis, Maryland: Naval Institute Press. ISBN 1-55750-263-3.
- Priolo, Gary. "R-10 (SS-87)". Navsource.net.
- Gardiner, Robert & Gray, Randal (1985). Conway's All the World's Fighting Ships 1906–1921. Annapolis, Maryland: Naval Institute Press. ISBN 0-85177-245-5.
- "R-10". Dictionary of American Naval Fighting Ships. Navy Department, Naval History and Heritage Command. 26 August 2015. This article incorporates text from this source, which is in the public domain.
- Hall, Anne Martin (1925). Ships of the United States navy and their sponsors, 1913-1923.
