= USS R-11 =

R-class submarine of the United States

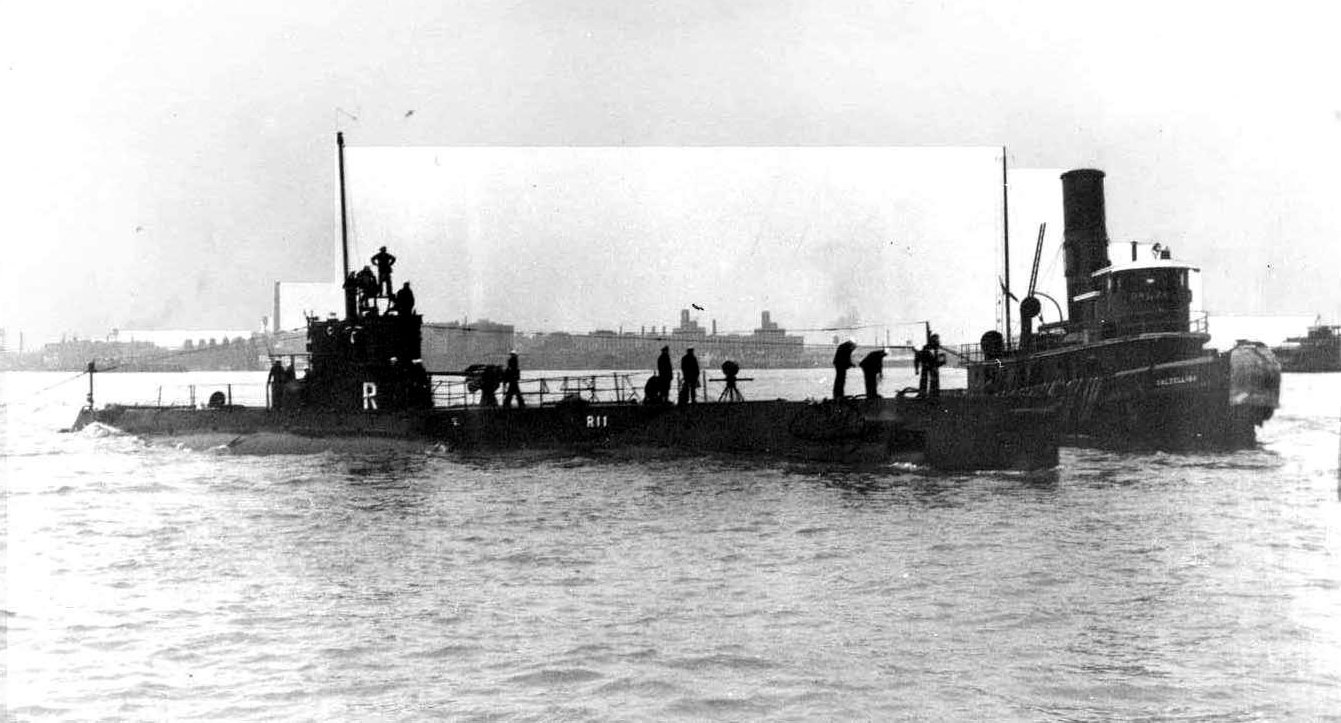
- USS R-11 (SS-88) arriving at The Battery, in New York City, for the World's Fair, 29 April 1939, the mercantile tug Dalzellico is immediately behind her

History

United States
- Name: R-11
- Ordered: 29 August 1916
- Builder: Fore River Shipbuilding Company, Quincy, Massachusetts
- Cost: $630,423.33 (hull and machinery)
- Laid down: 18 March 1918
- Launched: 21 July 1919
- Sponsored by: Miss Dorothy Batchelder
- Commissioned: 5 September 1919
- Decommissioned: 5 September 1945
- Stricken: 11 October 1945
- Identification: Hull symbol: SS-88 (17 July 1920); Call sign: NILQ
- Fate: Sold for scrap, 13 March 1946

General characteristics
- Class & type: R-1-class submarine
- Displacement: 574 long tons (583 t) surfaced; 685 long tons (696 t) submerged
- Length: 186 feet 3 inches (56.77 m)
- Beam: 18 ft (5.5 m)
- Draft: 15 ft 6 in (4.72 m)
- Installed power: 880 brake horsepower (656 kW) diesel; 934 hp (696 kW) electric
- Propulsion: 2 × NELSECO 6-EB-14 diesel engines; 2 × Electro-Dynamic Company electric motors; 2 × 60-cell batteries; 2 × Propellers
- Speed: 12.5 knots (23.2 km/h; 14.4 mph) surfaced; 9.3 kn (17.2 km/h; 10.7 mph) submerged
- Range: 4,700 nautical miles (8,700 km; 5,400 mi) at 6.2 kn (11.5 km/h; 7.1 mph), 7,000 nmi (13,000 km; 8,100 mi) if fuel loaded into the main ballast tanks
- Test depth: 200 ft (61 m)
- Capacity: 18,880 US gallons (71,500 L; 15,720 imp gal) fuel
- Complement: 2 officers; 27 enlisted
- Armament: 4 × 21-inch (533 mm) torpedo tubes (8 torpedoes); 1 × 3-inch (76 mm)/50-caliber deck gun

USS R-11 (SS-88), also known as "Submarine No. 88", was an R-1-class coastal and harbor defense submarines of the United States Navy commissioned after the end of World War I.

Due to space constraints, the boats built at the Fore River Shipbuilding Company yard, were laid down much later than the boats built at the Union Iron Works and the Lake Torpedo Boat Company yards. Because of this, none were commissioned before the end of WWI.

== Design ==
The R-boats built by the Fore River Shipbuilding Company, R-1 through R-14, and the Union Iron Works, R-15 through R-20, are sometimes considered a separate class, R-1-class, from those built by the Lake Torpedo Boat Company, R-21 through R-27, R-21-class.

The submarines had a length of 186 feet 3 inches (56.8 m) overall, a beam of 18 ft (5.5 m), and a mean draft of 15 ft 6 in (4.7 m). They displaced 574 long tons (583 t) on the surface and 685 long tons (696 t) submerged. The R-1-class submarines had a crew of 2 officers and 27 enlisted men. They had a diving depth of 200 ft (61.0 m).

For surface running, the boats were powered by two 440-brake-horsepower (328 kW) NELSECO 6-EB-14 diesel engines, each driving one propeller shaft. When submerged each propeller was driven by a 467-horsepower (348 kW) Electro-Dynamic Company electric motor. They could reach 12.5 knots (23.2 km/h; 14.4 mph) on the surface and 9.3 kn (17.2 km/h; 10.7 mph) underwater. On the surface, the R-1-class had a range of 4,700 nautical miles (8,700 km; 5,400 mi) at 6.2 kn (11.5 km/h; 7.1 mph), or 7,000 nmi (13,000 km; 8,100 mi) if fuel was loaded into their main ballast tanks.

The boats were armed with four 21-inch (533 mm) torpedo tubes in the bow. They carried four reloads, for a total of eight torpedoes. The R-1-class submarines were also armed with a single 3 in (76 mm)/50 caliber deck gun.

== Construction ==
R-11's keel was laid down on 18 March 1918, by the Fore River Shipbuilding Company, Quincy, Massachusetts. She was launched on 21 July 1919, sponsored by Miss Dorothy Batchelder, and commissioned on 20 August 1919.

== Service history ==
=== 1919–1930 ===
R-11 remained inactive at the Boston Navy Yard, with a crew of only two men, for two months, following commissioning. With the new year, 1920, she commenced training cruises along the New England coast, and in April, to Bermuda. On completion of training cruises, she returned to New London, Connecticut, whence she sailed on 31 May, for the Pacific.

When the US Navy adopted its hull classification system on 17 July 1920, she received the hull number SS-88.

R-11 arrived at Pearl Harbor, on 4 August. Homeported there for the next ten years, she conducted operations in the Hawaiian area, searched for missing ships, including the seagoing tug Conestoga, and planes; participated in tactical exercises; and engaged in fleet maneuvers.

=== 1931–1946 ===
On 12 December 1930, R-11 departed Pearl Harbor, for the last time, and steamed east to San Diego, California, whence she continued on through the Panama Canal, to New London. She returned to that Thames River base on 9 February 1931, and for the remainder of the decade served as a training ship primarily for the Submarine School, at New London, and occasionally for NROTC units in the southern New England area.

Transferred to Key West, Florida, on 1 June 1941, R-11 continued her training ship duties throughout the remainder of her career.

== Fate ==
Decommissioned 5 September 1945, R-11 was struck from the Naval Vessel Register on 11 October 1945; sold to Macey O. Smith, Miami, Florida, 13 March 1946; and scrapped in 1948.

== Bibliography ==
- "Table 21 - Ships on Navy List June 30, 1919". Congressional Serial Set. U.S. Government Printing Office: 770. 1921.
- Friedman, Norman (1995). U.S. Submarines Through 1945: An Illustrated Design History. Annapolis, Maryland: Naval Institute Press. ISBN 1-55750-263-3.
- Priolo, Gary. "R-11 (SS-88)". Navsource.net.
- Gardiner, Robert & Gray, Randal (1985). Conway's All the World's Fighting Ships 1906–1921. Annapolis, Maryland: Naval Institute Press. ISBN 0-85177-245-5.
- "R-11". Dictionary of American Naval Fighting Ships. Navy Department, Naval History and Heritage Command. This article incorporates text from this source, which is in the public domain.
- Hall, Anne Martin (1925). Ships of the United States navy and their sponsors, 1913-1923.
