= USS R-4 =

R-class submarine of the United States

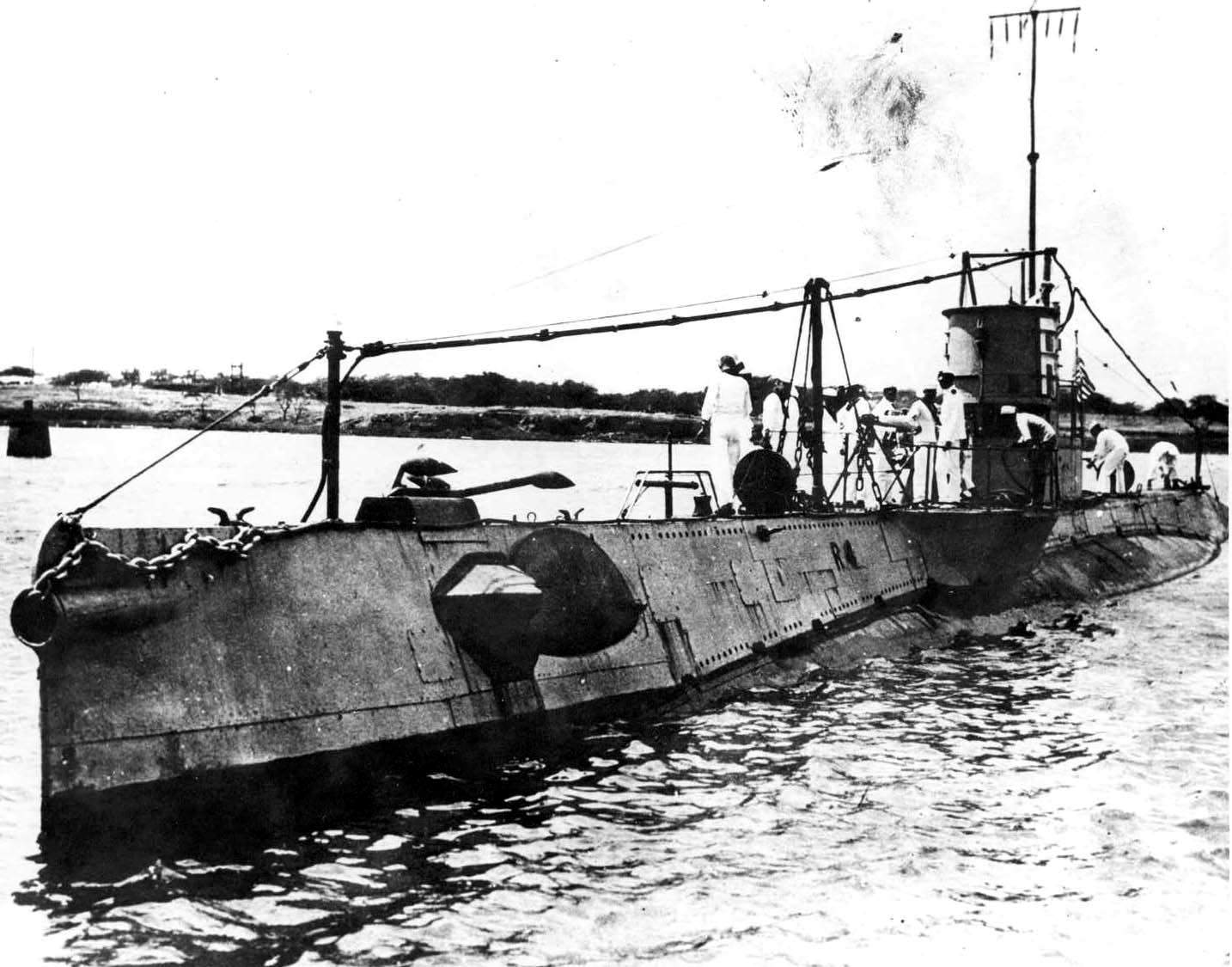
- USS R-4 with crew in dress whites preparing to go ashore, c. 1920s

History

United States
- Name: R-5
- Ordered: 29 August 1916
- Builder: Fore River Shipbuilding Company, Quincy, Massachusetts
- Cost: $729,966.30 (hull and machinery)
- Laid down: 16 October 1917
- Launched: 26 October 1918
- Sponsored by: Mrs. Blanche Stahl
- Commissioned: 28 March 1919
- Decommissioned: 18 June 1945
- Stricken: 11 July 1945
- Identification: Hull symbol: SS-81 (17 July 1920); Call sign: NILG
- Fate: Sold for scrap, 22 January 1946

General characteristics
- Class & type: R-1-class submarine
- Displacement: 574 long tons (583 t) surfaced; 685 long tons (696 t) submerged
- Length: 186 feet 3 inches (56.77 m)
- Beam: 18 ft (5.5 m)
- Draft: 15 ft 6 in (4.72 m)
- Installed power: 880 brake horsepower (656 kW) diesel; 934 hp (696 kW) electric
- Propulsion: 2 × NELSECO 6-EB-14 diesel engines; 2 × Electro-Dynamic Company electric motors; 2 × 60-cell batteries; 2 × Propellers
- Speed: 12.5 knots (23.2 km/h; 14.4 mph) surfaced; 9.3 kn (17.2 km/h; 10.7 mph) submerged
- Range: 4,700 nautical miles (8,700 km; 5,400 mi) at 6.2 kn (11.5 km/h; 7.1 mph), 7,000 nmi (13,000 km; 8,100 mi) if fuel loaded into the main ballast tanks
- Test depth: 200 ft (61 m)
- Capacity: 18,880 US gallons (71,500 L; 15,720 imp gal) fuel
- Complement: 2 officers; 27 enlisted
- Armament: 4 × 21-inch (533 mm) torpedo tubes (8 torpedoes); 1 × 3-inch (76 mm)/50-caliber deck gun

USS R-4 (SS-81), also known as "Submarine No. 81", was an R-1-class coastal and harbor defense submarines of the United States Navy commissioned after the end of World War I.

Due to space constraints, the boats built at the Fore River Shipbuilding Company yard, were laid down much later than the boats built at the Union Iron Works and the Lake Torpedo Boat Company yards. Because of this, none were commissioned before the end of WWI.

== Design ==
The R-boats built by the Fore River Shipbuilding Company, R-1 through R-14, and the Union Iron Works, R-15 through R-20, are sometimes considered a separate class, R-1-class, from those built by the Lake Torpedo Boat Company, R-21 through R-27, R-21-class.

The submarines had a length of 186 feet 3 inches (56.8 m) overall, a beam of 18 ft (5.5 m), and a mean draft of 15 ft 6 in (4.7 m). They displaced 574 long tons (583 t) on the surface and 685 long tons (696 t) submerged. The R-1-class submarines had a crew of 2 officers and 27 enlisted men. They had a diving depth of 200 ft (61.0 m).

For surface running, the boats were powered by two 440-brake-horsepower (328 kW) NELSECO 6-EB-14 diesel engines, each driving one propeller shaft. When submerged each propeller was driven by a 467-horsepower (348 kW) Electro-Dynamic Company electric motor. They could reach 12.5 knots (23.2 km/h; 14.4 mph) on the surface and 9.3 kn (17.2 km/h; 10.7 mph) underwater. On the surface, the R-1-class had a range of 4,700 nautical miles (8,700 km; 5,400 mi) at 6.2 kn (11.5 km/h; 7.1 mph), or 7,000 nmi (13,000 km; 8,100 mi) if fuel was loaded into their main ballast tanks.

The boats were armed with four 21-inch (533 mm) torpedo tubes in the bow. They carried four reloads, for a total of eight torpedoes. The R-1-class submarines were also armed with a single 3 in (76 mm)/50 caliber deck gun.

== Construction ==
R-4's keel was laid down on 16 October 1917, by the Fore River Shipbuilding Company, in Quincy, Massachusetts. She was launched on 26 October 1918, sponsored by Mrs. Blanche Stahl, and commissioned on 28 March 1919.

== Service history ==
After outfitting at Boston Navy Yard, R-4 joined Submarine Division 9, of the Atlantic Fleet, at New London, Connecticut, on 12 August 1919. She sailed on 4 December 1919, for Norfolk, Virginia, and winter operations in the Gulf of Mexico, from 21 January to 14 April 1920. R-4 later returned to New England on 18 May for four months of maneuvers with her division.

When the US Navy adopted its hull classification system on 17 July 1920, she received the hull number SS-81. She arrived at Norfolk on 15 September, for an overhaul lasting until April 1921.

R-4 deployed to the Pacific Ocean, on 11 April 1921, transited the Panama Canal, on 28 May, and arrived at her new base, San Pedro, California, on 30 June. She participated in war games with the battle fleet in the Gulf of Fonseca, from 5 February to 6 April 1923, returning to San Pedro, with the submarine tender Camden on 10 April. R-4 was transferred on 16 July, with Division 9, and the submarine tender Canopus, to Pearl Harbor, where she remained for the next eight years engaged in training and operations with fleet units.

On 12 September 1925, R-4 rescued John Rodgers, and his crew, who had just failed to make the first aerial crossing of the Pacific Ocean, from California to Hawaii, off the coast of Kauai.

R-4, ordered back to the Atlantic, with Divisions 9 and 14, on 12 December 1930, transited the Panama Canal, on 18 January 1931, and arrived on 9 February, at New London. She was soon assigned to Division 4, and served as a training ship for the next ten years, on rotating duty between the New London Submarine School, and the Yale University NROTC unit. An interesting incident took place during this assignment: according to one enlisted man (trainee), the submarine became stuck in the winter ice on the river and the trainees had to walk back to base. In 1940 and 1941, Lieutenant Glynn R. Donaho, a future vice admiral, was her commanding officer.

R-4 departed New London, on 26 May 1941, for Key West, Florida, and patrol duty in the Florida Straits, with Division 12. Back at New London, for the first two weeks in July, she returned to Key West, at midmonth, and until March 1945, alternated duties for the Fleet Sonar School, with patrols in the Florida Strait and the Yucatán Channel.

== Fate ==
At Port Everglades, Florida, from 11 March to 15 April 1945, R-4 returned to Key West, to prepare for inactivation. On 1 June, she was withdrawn from active duty, and on 4 June, she got underway for Philadelphia. Escorted by submarine chaser SC-1001, she arrived at Philadelphia, on 8 June, decommissioned on 18 June, and was struck from the Naval Vessel Register on 11 July. On 22 January 1946, she was sold for scrap to the North American Smelting Company.

== Bibliography ==
- "Table 21 - Ships on Navy List June 30, 1919". Congressional Serial Set. U.S. Government Printing Office: 770. 1921.
- Friedman, Norman (1995). U.S. Submarines Through 1945: An Illustrated Design History. Annapolis, Maryland: Naval Institute Press. ISBN 1-55750-263-3.
- Mohl, Michael. "R-4 (SS-81)". Navsource.net.
- Gardiner, Robert & Gray, Randal (1985). Conway's All the World's Fighting Ships 1906–1921. Annapolis, Maryland: Naval Institute Press. ISBN 0-85177-245-5.
- "R-4". Dictionary of American Naval Fighting Ships. Navy Department, Naval History and Heritage Command. This article incorporates text from this source, which is in the public domain.
- Hall, Anne Martin (1925). Ships of the United States navy and their sponsors, 1913-1923.
- "Bulldog Tenacity of Navy Searchers Robbed Sear of Victims; Is Termed Miracle". 11 September 1925.
