= USS R-2 =

R-class submarine of the United States

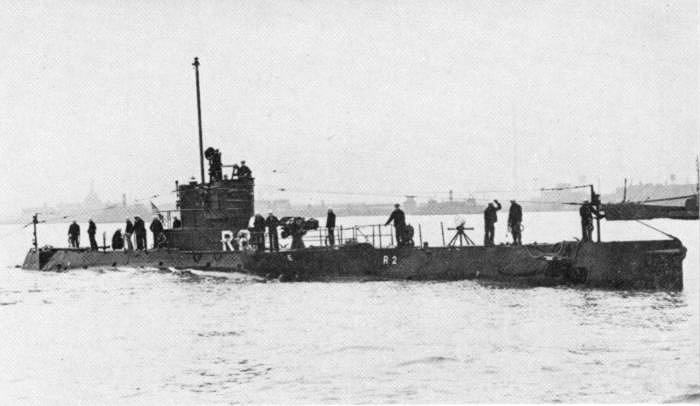
- USS R-2 arriving at the Battery in New York City,on 29 April 1939, during the 1939 New York World's Fair.

History

United States
- Name: R-2
- Ordered: 29 August 1916
- Builder: Fore River Shipbuilding Company, Quincy, Massachusetts
- Cost: $762,825.14 (hull and machinery)
- Laid down: 16 October 1917
- Launched: 23 September 1918
- Sponsored by: Mrs. Sarah Cooke
- Commissioned: 24 January 1919
- Decommissioned: 10 May 1945
- Stricken: 2 June 1945
- Identification: Hull symbol: SS-79 (17 July 1920); Call sign: NILD
- Fate: Sold for scrap, 28 September 1945

General characteristics
- Class & type: R-1-class submarine
- Displacement: 574 long tons (583 t) surfaced; 685 long tons (696 t) submerged
- Length: 186 feet 3 inches (56.77 m)
- Beam: 18 ft (5.5 m)
- Draft: 15 ft 6 in (4.72 m)
- Installed power: 880 brake horsepower (656 kW) diesel; 934 hp (696 kW) electric
- Propulsion: 2 × NELSECO 6-EB-14 diesel engines; 2 × Electro-Dynamic Company electric motors; 2 × 60-cell batteries; 2 × Propellers
- Speed: 12.5 knots (23.2 km/h; 14.4 mph) surfaced; 9.3 kn (17.2 km/h; 10.7 mph) submerged
- Range: 4,700 nautical miles (8,700 km; 5,400 mi) at 6.2 kn (11.5 km/h; 7.1 mph), 7,000 nmi (13,000 km; 8,100 mi) if fuel loaded into the main ballast tanks
- Test depth: 200 ft (61 m)
- Capacity: 18,880 US gallons (71,500 L; 15,720 imp gal) fuel
- Complement: 2 officers; 27 enlisted
- Armament: 4 × 21-inch (533 mm) torpedo tubes (8 torpedoes); 1 × 3-inch (76 mm)/50-caliber deck gun

USS R-2 (SS-79), also known as "Submarine No. 79", was an R-1-class coastal and harbor defense submarines of the United States Navy commissioned after the end of World War I.

Due to space constraints, the boats built at the Fore River Shipbuilding Company yard, were laid down much later than the boats built at the Union Iron Works and the Lake Torpedo Boat Company yards. Because of this, none were commissioned before the end of WWI.

== Design ==
The R-boats built by the Fore River Shipbuilding Company, R-1 through R-14, and the Union Iron Works, R-15 through R-20, are sometimes considered a separate class, R-1-class, from those built by the Lake Torpedo Boat Company, R-21 through R-27, R-21-class.

The submarines had a length of 186 feet 3 inches (56.8 m) overall, a beam of 18 ft (5.5 m), and a mean draft of 15 ft 6 in (4.7 m). They displaced 574 long tons (583 t) on the surface and 685 long tons (696 t) submerged. The R-1-class submarines had a crew of 2 officers and 27 enlisted men. They had a diving depth of 200 ft (61.0 m).

For surface running, the boats were powered by two 440-brake-horsepower (328 kW) NELSECO 6-EB-14 diesel engines, each driving one propeller shaft. When submerged each propeller was driven by a 467-horsepower (348 kW) Electro-Dynamic Company electric motor. They could reach 12.5 knots (23.2 km/h; 14.4 mph) on the surface and 9.3 kn (17.2 km/h; 10.7 mph) underwater. On the surface, the R-1-class had a range of 4,700 nautical miles (8,700 km; 5,400 mi) at 6.2 kn (11.5 km/h; 7.1 mph), or 7,000 nmi (13,000 km; 8,100 mi) if fuel was loaded into their main ballast tanks.

The boats were armed with four 21-inch (533 mm) torpedo tubes in the bow. They carried four reloads, for a total of eight torpedoes. The R-1-class submarines were also armed with a single 3 in (76 mm)/50 caliber deck gun.

== Construction ==
R-2's keel was laid down on 16 October 1917, by the Fore River Shipbuilding Company, in Quincy, Massachusetts. She was launched on 23 September 1918, sponsored by Mrs. Sarah Cooke, and commissioned at Boston, Massachusetts, on 24 January 1919, with Lieutenant Commander Charles Maynard "Savvy" Cooke, Jr., in command.

== Service history ==
After acceptance trials in Cape Cod Bay, R-2 was assigned to Submarine Division 9 of the Atlantic Fleet. and based at New London, Connecticut. She departed New London, on 4 December 1919, bound for Norfolk, Virginia, and winter division maneuvers in the Gulf of Mexico. Returning to New London, on 28 May 1920, she joined her sister boats R-1 and R-3, for four months of summer exercises off southern New England.

When the US Navy adopted its hull classification system on 17 July 1920, she received the hull number SS-79.

R-2 headed for Norfolk on 13 September 1920, for an overhaul.

R-2 was transferred to the Pacific Fleet, on 14 April 1921, she transited the Panama Canal, on 28 May 1921, and arrived on 30 June 1921, at her new base, San Pedro, California. She took part in fleet exercises off Central America, from 5 February to 6 April 1923. Returning to San Pedro, on 10 April 1923, R-2 was ordered to Hawaii, on 16 July, with submarine Division 9 and remained there for eight years, developing submarine tactics with the Pacific Fleet. She made an endurance cruise to Midway Atoll, in the Northwestern Hawaiian Islands, in July and August 1924.

Leaving Pearl Harbor, Hawaii, on 12 December 1930, R-2 was reassigned to the Atlantic Fleet, and arrived at New London, via the Panama Canal, on 9 February 1931. She was attached to Submarine Division 4 and for the next ten years served as a training ship for the Submarine School, at New London, and for the Yale University Naval Reserve Officer Training Corps unit.

Assigned to Submarine Division 12, on 1 June 1941, R-2 departed New London, on 16 June, and arrived on 22 June 1941, at Key West, Florida, her new home port. Based there for the remainder of her career, she was attached to the Fleet Sonar School, and assigned periodically to defensive patrols in keeping with her limited operational capabilities.

On 25 August 1942, the United States Coast Guard Cutter USCGC Cartigan (WSC-120) mistakenly opened gunfire on R-2 near Key West. R-2 sustained no damage.

== Fate ==
In the spring of 1945, with the approach of German capitulation, R-2 was ordered to Philadelphia, Pennsylvania, for inactivation. Arriving there on 1 May 1945, she was decommissioned on 10 May 1945, and struck from the Naval Vessel Register on 2 June 1945. She was sold to Rosoff Brothers, of New York City, on 28 September 1945, then resold to the Northern Metal Company, of Philadelphia, in October 1945, and scrapped in early 1946.

== Bibliography ==
- "Table 21 - Ships on Navy List June 30, 1919". Congressional Serial Set. U.S. Government Printing Office: 770. 1921.
- Friedman, Norman (1995). U.S. Submarines Through 1945: An Illustrated Design History. Annapolis, Maryland: Naval Institute Press. ISBN 1-55750-263-3.
- Priolo, Gary. "R-2 (SS-79)". Navsource.net.
- Gardiner, Robert & Gray, Randal (1985). Conway's All the World's Fighting Ships 1906–1921. Annapolis, Maryland: Naval Institute Press. ISBN 0-85177-245-5.
- "R-2". Dictionary of American Naval Fighting Ships. Navy Department, Naval History and Heritage Command. 26 August 2015. This article incorporates text from this source, which is in the public domain.
- Hall, Anne Martin (1925). Ships of the United States navy and their sponsors, 1913-1923.
- Blair, Clay Jr. (1975). Silent Victory. Philadelphia: J. B. Lippincott & Co. ISBN 0-397-01089-3.
- Hinman, Charles R.; Campbell, Douglas E. (2019). The Submarine Has No Friends: Friendly Fire Incidents Involving U.S. Submarines During World War II. Syneca Research Group, Inc. ISBN 978-0-359-76906-3.
