= USS R-12 =

R-class submarine of the United States

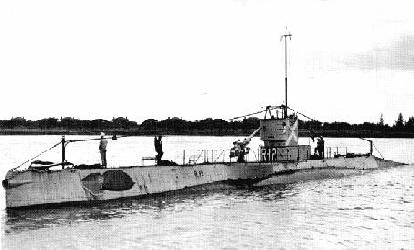
- USS R-12 (SS-89) in a harbor, during the 1920s or early 1930s, note the large "X" painted on the submarine's fairwater for recognition

History

United States
- Name: R-12
- Ordered: 29 August 1916
- Builder: Fore River Shipbuilding Company, Quincy, Massachusetts
- Cost: $632,166.52 (hull and machinery)
- Laid down: 28 March 1918
- Launched: 15 August 1919
- Sponsored by: Miss Helen Mack
- Commissioned: 23 September 1919
- Decommissioned: 7 December 1932
- Recommissioned: 16 October 1940
- Stricken: 6 July 1943
- Identification: Hull symbol: SS-89 (17 July 1920); Call sign: NILR
- Fate: Foundered, 12 June 1943

General characteristics
- Class & type: R-1-class submarine
- Displacement: 574 long tons (583 t) surfaced; 685 long tons (696 t) submerged
- Length: 186 feet 3 inches (56.77 m)
- Beam: 18 ft (5.5 m)
- Draft: 15 ft 6 in (4.72 m)
- Installed power: 880 brake horsepower (656 kW) diesel; 934 hp (696 kW) electric
- Propulsion: 2 × NELSECO 6-EB-14 diesel engines; 2 × Electro-Dynamic Company electric motors; 2 × 60-cell batteries; 2 × Propellers
- Speed: 12.5 knots (23.2 km/h; 14.4 mph) surfaced; 9.3 kn (17.2 km/h; 10.7 mph) submerged
- Range: 4,700 nautical miles (8,700 km; 5,400 mi) at 6.2 kn (11.5 km/h; 7.1 mph), 7,000 nmi (13,000 km; 8,100 mi) if fuel loaded into the main ballast tanks
- Test depth: 200 ft (61 m)
- Capacity: 18,880 US gallons (71,500 L; 15,720 imp gal) fuel
- Complement: 2 officers; 27 enlisted
- Armament: 4 × 21-inch (533 mm) torpedo tubes (8 torpedoes); 1 × 3-inch (76 mm)/50-caliber deck gun

USS R-12 (SS-89), also known as "Submarine No. 89", was an R-1-class coastal and harbor defense submarine of the United States Navy commissioned after the end of World War I.

Due to space constraints, the boats built at the Fore River Shipbuilding Company yard, were laid down much later than the boats built at the Union Iron Works and the Lake Torpedo Boat Company yards. Because of this, none were commissioned before the end of WWI.

== Design ==
The R-boats built by the Fore River Shipbuilding Company, R-1 through R-14, and the Union Iron Works, R-15 through R-20, are sometimes considered a separate class, R-1-class, from those built by the Lake Torpedo Boat Company, R-21 through R-27, R-21-class.

The submarines had a length of 186 feet 3 inches (56.8 m) overall, a beam of 18 ft (5.5 m), and a mean draft of 15 ft 6 in (4.7 m). They displaced 574 long tons (583 t) on the surface and 685 long tons (696 t) submerged. The R-1-class submarines had a crew of 2 officers and 27 enlisted men. They had a diving depth of 200 ft (61.0 m).

For surface running, the boats were powered by two 440-brake-horsepower (328 kW) NELSECO 6-EB-14 diesel engines, each driving one propeller shaft. When submerged each propeller was driven by a 467-horsepower (348 kW) Electro-Dynamic Company electric motor. They could reach 12.5 knots (23.2 km/h; 14.4 mph) on the surface and 9.3 kn (17.2 km/h; 10.7 mph) underwater. On the surface, the R-1-class had a range of 4,700 nautical miles (8,700 km; 5,400 mi) at 6.2 kn (11.5 km/h; 7.1 mph), or 7,000 nmi (13,000 km; 8,100 mi) if fuel was loaded into their main ballast tanks.

The boats were armed with four 21-inch (533 mm) torpedo tubes in the bow. They carried four reloads, for a total of eight torpedoes. The R-1-class submarines were also armed with a single 3 in (76 mm)/50 caliber deck gun.

== Construction ==
R-12's keel was laid down by the Fore River Shipbuilding Company, of Quincy, Massachusetts, on 28 March 1918. She was launched on 15 August 1919, sponsored by Miss Helen Mack, and commissioned at the Boston Navy Yard, on 23 September 1919.

== Service history ==
=== 1919–1932 ===
R-12 remained at Boston, Massachusetts, until she headed down the coast on 11 March, to New London, Connecticut, whence she operated until the end of May. She then continued south to Panama, and transited the Panama Canal, at the end of June. R-12 arrived at San Pedro, California, in July 1920.

When the US Navy adopted its hull classification system on 17 July 1920, she received the hull number SS-89.

She departed the California coast for Pearl Harbor, at the end of August. Arriving on 6 September 1920, she remained in Hawaiian waters, with occasional exercises on the West Coast, and off Johnston Island, until 12 December 1930.

On 12 December 1930, R-12, and 18 of her sisters, got underway to begin the 7,300-nautical-mile (13,500 km; 8,400 mi) voyage to the East Coast in company with the submarine tender Camden, and the submarine rescue vessel Chewink. R-12 returned to New London, on 9 February 1931. She conducted exercises with Destroyer Squadrons (DesRons) of the Scouting Force, into the spring, then following overhaul, trained sailors assigned to the Submarine School. On 27 September 1932, she departed New London, for the Philadelphia Navy Yard, where after decommissioning on 7 December 1932, she joined other R-class boats berthed there in the Reserve Fleet.

=== 1940–1943 ===
Building a two-ocean navy required trained people, and the R-class boats returned to service to provide training boats. Accordingly, R-12 was recommissioned, in ordinary, on 1 July 1940, and shifted to New London, to complete activation. Recommissioned in full on 16 October 1940, she sailed for Panama on 10 December.

R-12 reached Coco Solo, on the day after Christmas, of 1940, and operated thence "a period punctuated by an annual military inspection (20 May 1941) and a yard availability and docking (27 June-21 July)" through the summer of 1941. She transited the Panama Canal, southbound, on 2 September, operated in the vicinity of the Perlas Islands, then transited the isthmian waterway again, northbound, on 20 September. Clearing the Canal Zone, on 14 October, R-12 proceeded, via the Florida Straits, to New London, her home port, arriving there on 23 October. Subsequently, operating in Area George, from 23 to 29 November, R-12 departed her home port on 7 December 1941, and proceeded via the Cape Cod Canal, to Provincetown, Massachusetts, reaching her destination on December 9. Proceeding thence to Casco Bay, Maine, she conducted operations in those waters, from 11 December 1941 – 3 January 1942, until returning to New London, via the Cape Cod Canal, on 4 January 1942. She received an interim docking at New London, later that month.

Proceeding from New London, to Saint Thomas, Virgin Islands, R-12 operated thence, a period punctuated by her annual military inspection on 20 June 1942, until 1 July, when she sailed for Guantanamo Bay. Reaching her destination on 9 July, she trained in Cuban waters until 20 November, when she sailed for Key West, in convoy GK-714, sister boat R-15 serving as her relief at Guantanamo. After a time at Key West, from 23 November–12 December 1942, during which time she received an interim docking period, R-12 departed on the latter date to return to Guantanamo Bay, sailing in company with the submarine chasers SC-695 and SC-1039, reaching her destination on 15 December. She operated in Cuban waters through mid-February 1943. Sailing on 17 February 1943, R-12 paused briefly at Bermuda, from 22 to 24 February, before continuing on to her home port, standing in to New London, on 21 February 1943. During her time at New London, the boat received a yard availability and docking, from March–April 1943. R-12 passed Point Judith, on 1 May, bound for Key West, arriving soon thereafter to resume her training work in those waters.

==== Accident and loss ====
At 07:16, on 12 June 1943, R-12, considered a "well-organized and well-trained submarine," put to sea from Key West, with 47 hands on board, all of her assigned officers, six, two-thirds of her regularly assigned crew, twenty-six men, enlisted trainees, thirteen, and two Brazilian Navy observers, on board. She submerged at about 08:15, and conducted scheduled sound exercises, in concert with the coastal yacht Coral, upon completion of which R-12 surfaced, and Coral headed back to her base. R-12 then prepared to conduct a torpedo firing, and altered course accordingly, shifting from electric motors to diesel engines. She proceeded on both engines toward her assigned area, moving at nine knots (17 km/h; 10 mph) on course 275° (T), rigged for dive. At about 12:23, R-12's navigator and second officer, reported from the control room: "Forward battery flooding." The collision alarm sounded from below. The commander, on the bridge, immediately ordered number one and number two ballast tanks blown. R-12, however, tipped "forward rapidly at a large angle." R-12 sank quickly, taking with her 42 officers and men.

The commanding officer, Lieutenant Commander Edward E. Shelby, one other officer, and three enlisted men, were swept from the bridge as the boat sank and were rescued from the sea at 18:00, by the submarine chaser SC-449. The subsequent 14-day search involved as many as 14 ships. R-12, located on 23 June 1943, southeast of Key West, in 93 fathoms (558 ft; 170 m) of water, was stricken from the Navy Register on 6 July 1943.

== Discovery ==
Sometime before 25 May 2011, an exploration team led by Tim Taylor, aboard the expedition vessel RV Tiburon located and documented the wreck of R-12. The reason for her loss remains unknown. In making the discovery, the team deployed a state-of-the-art autonomous underwater robot which collected first ever imagery of the remains of R-12. They are collaborating and sharing their findings with the US Navy. Tiburon launched a further diving missions to determine the possible causes of the sinking, and collect detailed archeological baseline data, however the way of sinking still currently remains unknown.

Wreck location: 24°24′30″N 81°38′30″W

== Memorials ==
- There is a granite marker in honor of R-12, at the National Submarine Memorial, in Groton, Connecticut.
- There is a small monument in honor of R-12, and her crew, at the Rhode Island Veterans Cemetery, in Exeter, Rhode Island.
- There is a granite marker in honor of "R-12", and her crew, at the Pacific Fleet Submarine Memorial Museum, in Pearl Harbor, Hawaii.

== Awards ==
- American Defense Service Medal with "FLEET" clasp
- American Campaign Medal
- World War II Victory Medal

== Bibliography ==
- "Table 21 - Ships on Navy List June 30, 1919". Congressional Serial Set. U.S. Government Printing Office: 770. 1921.
- Friedman, Norman (1995). U.S. Submarines Through 1945: An Illustrated Design History. Annapolis, Maryland: Naval Institute Press. ISBN 1-55750-263-3.
- Priolo, Gary. "R-12 (SS-89)". Navsource.net.
- Gardiner, Robert & Gray, Randal (1985). Conway's All the World's Fighting Ships 1906–1921. Annapolis, Maryland: Naval Institute Press. ISBN 0-85177-245-5.
- Cressman, Robert J. (20 August 2024). "R-12". Dictionary of American Naval Fighting Ships. Navy Department, Naval History and Heritage Command. This article incorporates text from this source, which is in the public domain.
- Hall, Anne Martin (1925). Ships of the United States navy and their sponsors, 1913-1923.
- Sotos, George P. (2020). Living with the Torpedo: Anti-Submarine Warfare, Command, and Shipboard Life in the US Navy During World War II. Mt. Vernon, Virginia: Mount Vernon Book Systems. ISBN 978-0-9818193-9-6.
