= Edward E. Shelby =

American Navy officer (1910–1973)

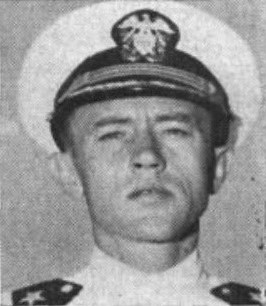
- Nickname: Ed
- Born: 1 September 1910; Memphis, Tennessee, U.S.
- Died: 19 June 1973 (aged 62)
- Allegiance: United States of America
- Branch: United States Navy
- Service years: 1933–1962
- Rank: Captain
- Commands: USS Elokomin; Submarine Squadron Six; USS Corporal; USS Sunfish; USS R-12
- Conflicts: World War II
- Awards: Navy Cross (3); Silver Star

Edward Ellis Shelby (1 September 1910 – 19 June 1973) was a United States Navy captain. A decorated veteran of World War II, he earned the Navy Cross three times as commander of the submarine USS Sunfish in the Pacific theatre.

== Early life and education ==
Shelby was born in Memphis, Tennessee and raised in San Antonio, Texas. After studying at the Marion Military Institute, he entered the United States Naval Academy in 1929 and graduated with a B.S. degree on 1 June 1933. Shelby later attended the Armed Forces Staff College, graduating on 22 January 1949.

== Career ==
After graduation from the Naval Academy, Shelby served aboard the light cruiser USS Raleigh. In January 1937, he entered submarine training at New London, Connecticut. Shelby was then assigned to the submarine USS S-42.

In January 1942, Shelby assumed command of the submarine USS R-12. In October 1942, he was promoted to lieutenant commander. In June 1943, the R-12 sank in a training accident near Key West, Florida with the loss of forty-two lives. Shelby and four others were washed overboard from the bridge and rescued from the sea about six hours later.

In December 1943, Shelby was given command of the submarine USS Sunfish. Promoted to commander in January 1944, he remained her commanding officer until March 1945, conducting five combat patrols against Japanese shipping in the Pacific. Shelby was awarded the Silver Star for the first patrol and the Navy Cross for each of the next three patrols.

Returning to the United States, Shelby supervised the fitting out of the new submarine USS Corporal in Groton, Connecticut. He then served as her first commanding officer from November 1945 to January 1946.

In January 1952, Shelby was promoted to captain. From June 1954 to August 1955, he served as commanding officer of Submarine Squadron Six and the Submarine Refit and Training Group at Norfolk, Virginia. Shelby was then given command of the fleet oiler USS Elokomin until 1956.

Shelby retired from active duty in March 1962.

== Personal ==
After his death on 19 June 1973, Shelby was buried at Arlington National Cemetery on 7 August 1973. His wife Carolyn Watkins Shelby (5 November 1913 – 25 March 1992) was later interred beside him.
