= SS-101 =

SS-101 or SS 101 may refer to:

- SS Heavy Panzer Battalion 101, a unit of the German Army
- USS R-24 (SS-101), a United States Navy submarine which saw service during World War I
