= SS-78 =

SS-78 or SS 78 may refer to:

- USS R-1 (SS-78), a United States Navy submarine which saw service during World War I
- Texas State Highway Spur 78, a road in the State of Texas, United States
