= USS R-24 =

R-class submarine of the United States

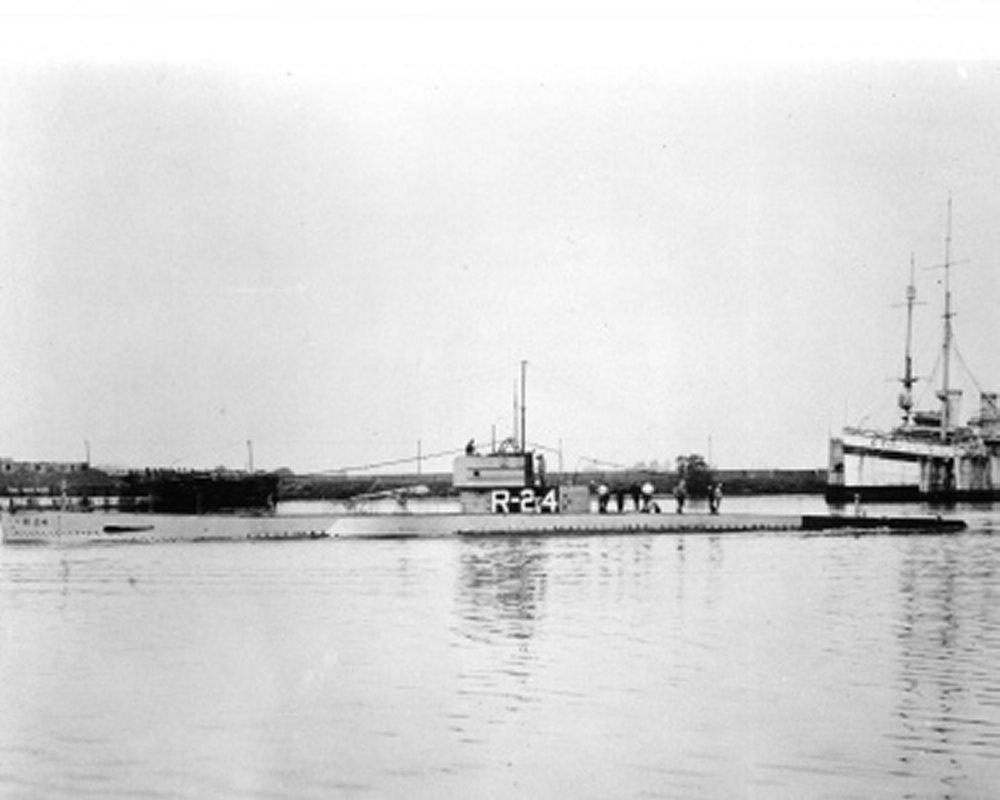
- USS R-24 (SS-101) in the Reserve Basin at the Philadelphia Navy Yard, 22 September 1923, when the boat was undergoing a shipyard overhaul

History

United States
- Name: R-24
- Ordered: 29 August 1916
- Builder: Lake Torpedo Boat Company, Bridgeport, Connecticut
- Cost: $871,310.58 (hull and machinery)
- Laid down: 9 May 1917
- Launched: 21 August 1918
- Sponsored by: Mrs. Elizabeth Norton
- Commissioned: 27 June 1919
- Decommissioned: 11 June 1925
- Stricken: 9 May 1930
- Identification: Hull symbol: SS-101 (17 July 1920); Call sign: NIMB
- Fate: Sold for scrap, 30 July 1930

General characteristics
- Class & type: R-21-class submarine
- Displacement: 497 long tons (505 t) surfaced; 652 long tons (662 t) submerged
- Length: 175 feet (53 m)
- Beam: 16 ft 7 in (5.05 m)
- Draft: 13 ft 11 in (4.24 m)
- Installed power: 1,000 brake horsepower (746 kW) diesel; 800 hp (597 kW) electric
- Propulsion: 2 × Busch-Sulzer diesel engines; 2 × Diehl Manufacture Company electric motors; 1 × 120-cell batteries; 2 × Propellers
- Speed: 14 knots (26 km/h; 16 mph) surfaced; 11 kn (20 km/h; 13 mph) submerged
- Range: 3,523 nautical miles (6,525 km; 4,054 mi) at 11 kn (20 km/h; 13 mph), 6,499 nmi (12,036 km; 7,479 mi) if fuel loaded into the main ballast tanks
- Test depth: 200 ft (61 m)
- Capacity: 17,922 US gallons (67,840 L; 14,923 imp gal) fuel
- Complement: 3 officers; 23 enlisted
- Armament: 4 × 21-inch (533 mm) torpedo tubes (8 torpedoes); 1 × 3-inch (76 mm)/50-caliber deck gun

USS R-24 (SS-101), also known as "Submarine No. 101", was an R-21-class coastal and harbor defense submarines of the United States Navy commissioned after the end of World War I.

== Design ==
The R-boats built by the Lake Torpedo Boat Company, R-21 through R-27, are sometimes considered a separate class, R-21-class, from those built by the Fore River Shipbuilding Company, R-1 through R-14, and the Union Iron Works, R-15 through R-20, R-1-class.

The submarines had a length of 175 feet (53.3 m) overall, a beam of 16 ft 7 in (5.1 m), and a mean draft of 13 ft 11 in (4.2 m). They displaced 497 long tons (505 t) on the surface and 652 long tons (662 t) submerged. The R-21-class submarines had a crew of 3 officers and 23 enlisted men. They had a diving depth of 200 ft (61.0 m).

For surface running, the boats were powered by two 500-brake-horsepower (373 kW) Busch-Sulzer diesel engines, each driving one propeller shaft. When submerged each propeller was driven by a 400-horsepower (298 kW) Diehl Manufacture Company electric motor. They could reach 14 knots (26 km/h; 16 mph) on the surface and 11 kn (20 km/h; 13 mph) underwater. On the surface, the R-21-class had a range of 3,523 nautical miles (6,525 km; 4,054 mi) at 11 kn (20 km/h; 13 mph), or 6,499 nmi (12,036 km; 7,479 mi) if fuel was loaded into their main ballast tanks.

The boats were armed with four 21-inch (533 mm) torpedo tubes in the bow. They carried four reloads, for a total of eight torpedoes. The R-21-class submarines were also armed with a single 3 in (76 mm)/50 caliber deck gun.

== Construction ==
R-24's keel was laid down on 9 May 1919, by the Lake Torpedo Boat Company, of Bridgeport, Connecticut. She was launched on 21 August 1918, sponsored by Mrs. Elizabeth Norton, and commissioned on 27 June 1919, with future Rear Admiral, Lieutenant Commander Andrew Carl Bennett in command.

== Service history ==
After four months of coastal operations off southern New England, R-24 got underway for her homeport, Coco Solo, in the Panama Canal Zone, on 1 November.

When the US Navy adopted its hull classification system on 17 July 1920, she received the hull number SS-101.

At the end of 1921, she returned to the United States for a shipyard overhaul. In the fall of 1922, she resumed operations out of Coco Solo, and Balboa. A year later she again sailed to the United States, for a shipyard overhaul, and at the end of 1924, she returned for inactivation.

== Fate ==
On 25 January 1925, she arrived at the Philadelphia Navy Yard, and on 11 June, she was decommissioned after only five-and-a-half years of service. R-24 was berthed at League Island, for the next five years. On 9 May 1930, she was struck from the Naval Vessel Register, and on 30 July 1930, she was sold for scrapping.

== Bibliography ==
- "Table 21 - Ships on Navy List June 30, 1919". Congressional Serial Set. U.S. Government Printing Office: 770. 1921.
- Friedman, Norman (1995). U.S. Submarines Through 1945: An Illustrated Design History. Annapolis, Maryland: Naval Institute Press. ISBN 1-55750-263-3.
- Priolo, Gary. "R-24 (SS-101)". Navsource.net.
- Gardiner, Robert & Gray, Randal (1985). Conway's All the World's Fighting Ships 1906–1921. Annapolis, Maryland: Naval Institute Press. ISBN 0-85177-245-5.
- "R-24". Dictionary of American Naval Fighting Ships. Navy Department, Naval History and Heritage Command. This article incorporates text from this source, which is in the public domain.
- Hall, Anne Martin (1925). Ships of the United States navy and their sponsors, 1913-1923.
