= Howard W. Gilmore =

American naval submarine officer and WWII Medal of Honor recipient

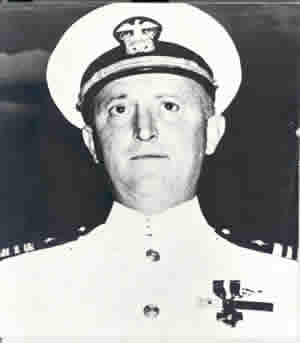
- Born: Howard Walter Gilmore; September 29, 1902; Selma, Alabama, U.S.
- Died: February 7, 1943 (aged 40) off the Solomon Islands
- Burial place: remains not recovered; listed on the Walls of the Missing, Manila American Cemetery and Memorial, Manila, Philippines
- Military career
- Branch: United States Navy
- Years: 1920–1943
- Rank: Commander
- Commands: USS Shark (SS-174); USS Growler (SS-215)
- Conflicts: Pacific War
- Awards: Medal of Honor; Navy Cross (2)

Howard Walter Gilmore (September 29, 1902 – February 7, 1943) was a submarine commander in the United States Navy who posthumously received the Medal of Honor for his self-sacrifice during World War II.

== Early life and career ==
Howard Gilmore was born in Selma, Alabama, on September 29, 1902, and enlisted in the Navy on November 15, 1920. In 1922 he was appointed to the United States Naval Academy by competitive examination. Standing 34th of a class of 436, Gilmore was commissioned in 1926 and reported to the battleship USS Mississippi (BB-41). His Naval Academy classmates included Wade McClusky, Max Leslie, Lofton Henderson, and Carlton Hutchins. Gilmore underwent submarine training during 1930 and in the years that followed served in various submarines and at stations ashore.

Gilmore served as the executive officer of the submarine USS Shark (SS-174), and in a near-fatal incident during the submarine's shakedown cruise, narrowly survived an assault by a group of thugs in Panama who cut his throat during an excursion ashore. He faced several other tragedies, including the death of his first wife from disease, and at the time of his Medal of Honor action, his second wife was still in a coma from a fall down a flight of stairs. In 1941, he assumed his first command, USS Shark (SS-174), only to be transferred the day after the attack on Pearl Harbor to command the still-unfinished submarine USS Growler (SS-215).

== World War II ==
Gilmore commanded his submarine skillfully during four Pacific War patrols. During his first, on 5 July 1942, Growler attacked three enemy destroyers off Kiska, sinking one and severely damaging the other two, while narrowly avoiding two torpedoes fired in return, for which Gilmore received the Navy Cross.

During his second patrol, Growler sank four merchant ships totaling 15,000 tons in the East China Sea near Formosa for which the Navy awarded him another Navy Cross.

During October 1942, Growler patrolled off Truk in the Caroline Islands as part of a repositioning of submarine assets on the way to Brisbane, Australia. No significant action occurred.

=== Fourth war patrol and Medal of Honor action ===
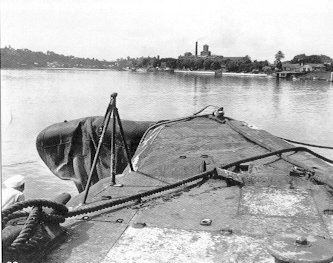
USS Growler (SS-215) at Brisbane, Australia for repairs to her bow after she rammed a Japanese patrol vessel in the Bismarck Islands on 7 February 1943.

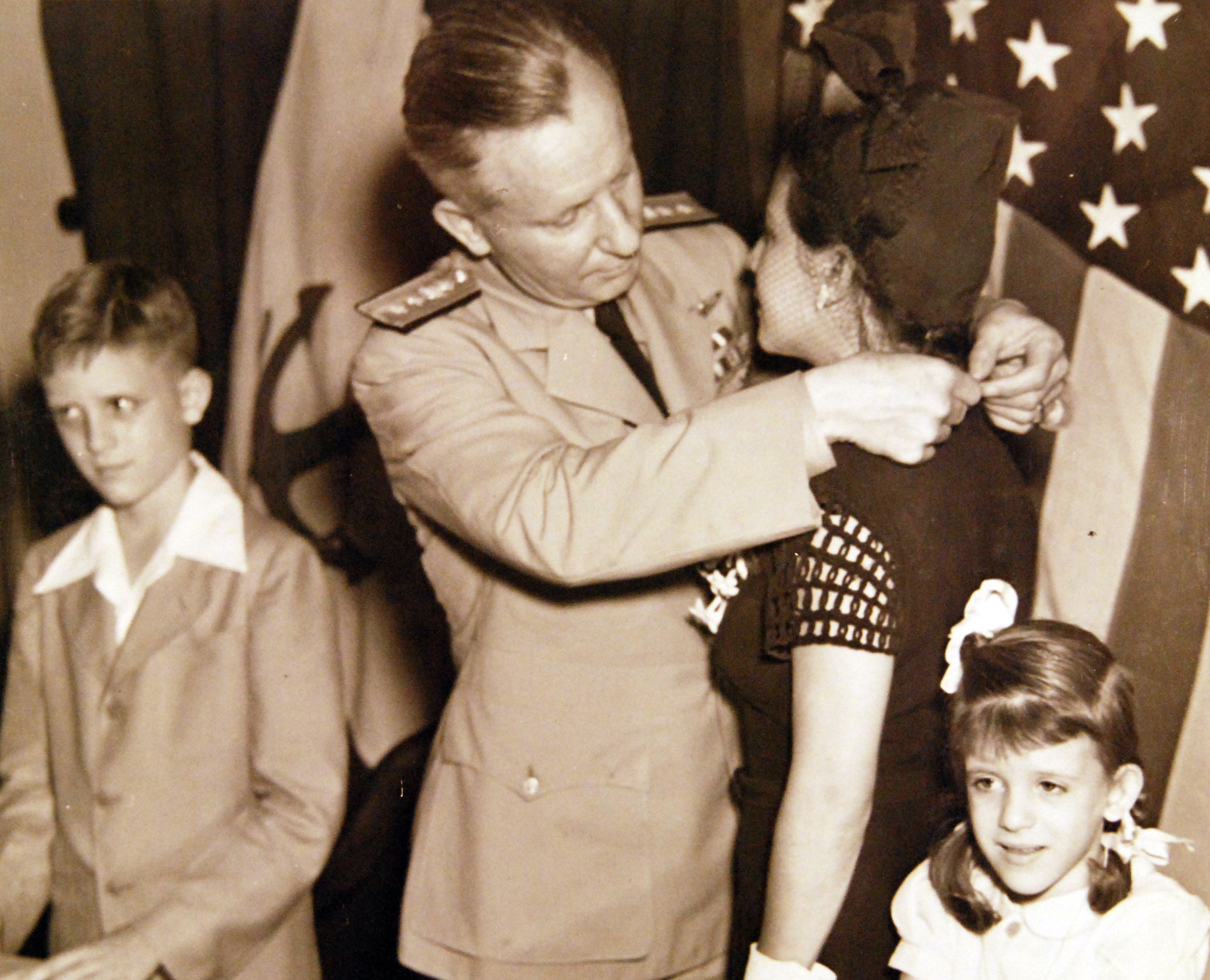
Rear Admiral Andrew C. Bennett, Commandant, Eighth Naval District, bestows the Medal of Honor upon the widow of Howard W. Gilmore.

The submarine continued to take a heavy toll on shipping on its fourth war patrol, and during the night of 6–7 February 1943, it approached a convoy stealthily for a surface attack. Suddenly a convoy escort named Hayasaki closed and prepared to ram. As the small ship charged from the darkness, Gilmore sounded the collision alarm and shouted, "Left full rudder!" but to no avail. Perhaps inadvertently, Growler hit Hayasaki amidships at 17 knots (31 km/h; 20 mph), heeling the submarine 50 degrees, bending 18 feet (5.5 m) of its bow sideways to port and disabling the forward torpedo tubes.

Simultaneously, the Japanese crew launched a burst of machine gun fire at Growler's bridge, killing the junior officer of the deck and a lookout, while wounding Gilmore and two other men. Gilmore ordered the men to clear the bridge as he struggled to cling to the frame. As the rest of the bridge party dropped down the hatch into the conning tower, the executive officer, Lieutenant Commander Arnold Schade, shaken by the impact and dazed by his own fall into the control room, waited for Gilmore to appear. Instead, he heard, "Take her down!" Realizing that he could not drop below in time if the ship were to escape, Gilmore's command meant that he was doomed. Schade hesitated briefly and then obeyed the order and submerged the crippled ship.

Surfacing some time later to attack the Hayasaki, Schade found the seas empty. The Japanese ship had survived the encounter, but there was no sign of Gilmore, who had drifted away during the night. Schade and Growler's crew controlled the ship's flooding and voyaged back to Brisbane on February 17.

For sacrificing himself to save his ship, Gilmore was posthumously awarded the Medal of Honor, becoming the second man of the submarine force to receive the honor.

== World War II summary ==
Summary of CDR Howard W. Gilmore's USS Growler (SS-215) war patrols
	Departing From	Date	Days	Wartime Credit Ships/Tonnage	JANAC Credit Ships/Tonnage	Patrol Area
Growler-	Pearl Harbor, TH (Territory of Hawaii)	May 1942	15	zero / zero	zero / zero	Midway; Estimated
Growler-1	Pearl Harbor, TH	June 1942	27	2 / 3,400	1 / 1,850	Alaska
Growler-2	Pearl Harbor, TH	August 1942	49	4 / 26,000	4 / 14,974	East China Sea
Growler-3	Pearl Harbor, TH	October 1942	49	zero / zero	zero / zero	Brisbane; Via Truk
Growler-4	Brisbane, Australia	January 1943	48	2 / 7,900	1 / 5,857	Solomons

Ranking compared to other top skippers
Ranking	Number of Patrols	Ships/Tons Credited	Ships/Tons JANAC
74	5	8 / 37,300	6 / 22,681

== Awards and decorations ==

Badge	Submarine Warfare insignia		
1st row	Medal of Honor		Navy Cross with Gold Star
2nd row	Purple Heart		Navy Unit Commendation
3rd row	American Defense Service Medal with Fleet Clasp	American Campaign Medal	Asiatic-Pacific Campaign Medal with four campaign stars
4th row	World War II Victory Medal	Navy Rifle Marksmanship Ribbon	Navy Pistol Marksmanship Ribbon

=== Medal of Honor citation ===
For distinguished gallantry and valor above and beyond the call of duty as commanding officer of the U.S.S. Growler during her Fourth War Patrol in the Southwest Pacific from 10 January to 7 February 1943. Boldly striking at the enemy in spite of continuous hostile air and antisubmarine patrols, Comdr. Gilmore sank one Japanese freighter and damaged another by torpedo fire, successfully evading severe depth charges following each attack. In the darkness of night on 7 February, an enemy gunboat closed range and prepared to ram the Growler. Comdr. Gilmore daringly maneuvered to avoid the crash and rammed the attacker instead, ripping into her port side at 11 knots and bursting wide her plates. In the terrific fire of the sinking gunboat's heavy machineguns, Comdr. Gilmore calmly gave the order to clear the bridge, and refusing safety for himself, remained on deck while his men preceded him below. Struck down by the fusillade of bullets and having done his utmost against the enemy, in his final living moments, Comdr. Gilmore gave his last order to the officer of the deck, "Take her down". The Growler dived; seriously damaged but under control, she was brought safely to port by her well-trained crew inspired by the courageous fighting spirit of their dead captain.

Even today "Take her down!" remains one of the legendary phrases of the U.S. Submarine Force.

=== Other posthumous honors ===
- In September 1943, the submarine tender USS Howard W. Gilmore (AS-16) was named for him and sponsored by his widow.
- A cenotaph (photo of stone can be found here) in Commander Gilmore's memory and honor was placed by Ed Shields, Ward Calhoun, and the Lauderdale County Department of Archives and History, Inc. at Magnolia Cemetery, Meridian, Mississippi in the Howard Family Plot. His mother's maiden name was Howard.
- Building 84 onboard Naval Submarine Base New London in Groton, CT is named Gilmore Hall in honor of Commander Gilmore.

== Popular culture ==
Howard Gilmore's sacrifice inspired five different authors and screenwriters.

- In the historical notes section epilogue of War and Remembrance (copyright 1978 by Herman Wouk, Library of Congress catalog Card Number 78-17746) Howard Gilmore is recognized by "The death of Carter Aster is based on the famous self-sacrifice of Commander Howard W. Gilmore of the U.S.S. Growler for which he was posthumously awarded the Congressional Medal of Honor".
- In the movie Operation Pacific, John Wayne's character as Executive Officer of USS Thunderfish orders Thunderfish submerged, leaving his wounded Commanding Officer (played by Ward Bond) on the bridge. Ward Bond would subsequently appear in a short subject film about Gilmore, The Growler Story (1958), but playing the Chief of Boat (senior NCO) of the Growler with Ken Curtis portraying Gilmore; this was one of a series of USN training films on leadership directed by famed Hollywood director and US Naval Reserve Rear Admiral John Ford.
- In the movie Submarine Command, on the last day of World War II William Holden's character as Executive Officer of USS Tiger Shark orders Tiger Shark submerged while under attack from a Japanese destroyer, leaving his wounded Commanding Officer (played by Jack Gregson) on the bridge.
- In the movie U-571, Bill Paxton's character Lt. Cmdr. Mike Dahlgren (Captain of the S-33) orders Lt. Andrew Tyler (Played by Matthew McConaughey) to take down the captured German U-boat. Tyler complies, leaving his wounded Commanding Officer in the waters.
- In Robb White's novel Up Periscope, Phil Carney as Executive Officer of USS Shark reluctantly submerges the submarine while under attack from a Japanese airplane, leaving his wounded Commanding Officer Paul Stevenson on the bridge after being ordered to "Take her down".

== See also ==
- List of Medal of Honor recipients for World War II
