= USS Corporal =

Submarine of the United States

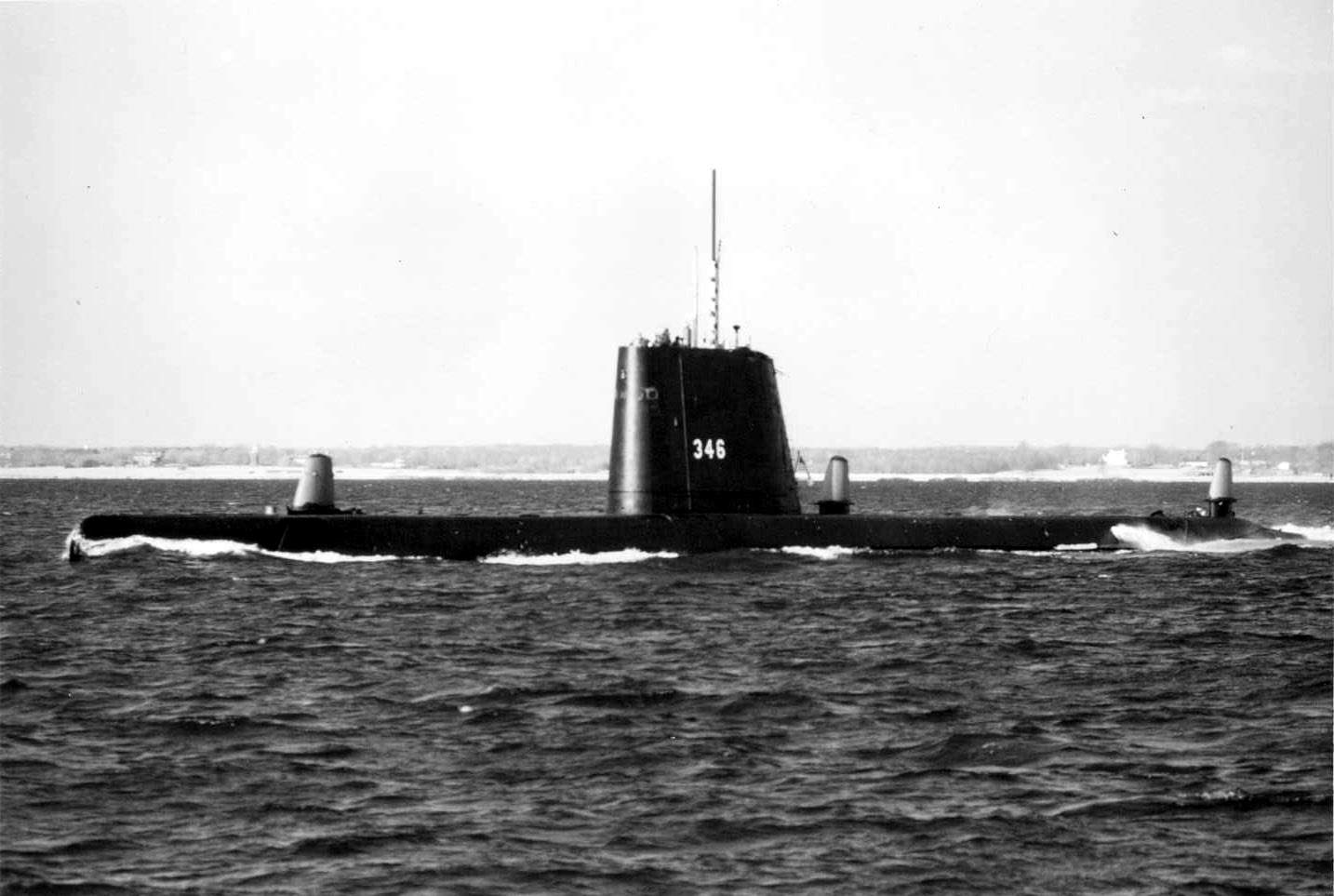
- USS Corporal underway in 1969 (the three distinctive shark-fin domes are the PUFFS sonar).

History

United States
- Name: USS Corporal
- Builder: Electric Boat Company, Groton, Connecticut
- Laid down: 27 April 1944
- Launched: 10 June 1945
- Commissioned: 9 November 1945
- Decommissioned: 28 November 1973
- Stricken: 28 November 1973
- Identification: SS-346
- Fate: Transferred to Turkey, 21 November 1973

Turkey
- Name: TCG 2. İnönü
- Acquired: 21 November 1973
- Commissioned: 12 February 1974
- Stricken: 2 September 1996
- Identification: S 333
- Fate: Scrapped

General characteristics
- Class & type: Balao-class diesel-electric submarine
- Displacement: 1,526 tons (1,550 t) surfaced; 2,424 tons (2,463 t) submerged
- Length: 311 ft 9 in (95.02 m)
- Beam: 27 ft 3 in (8.31 m)
- Draft: 16 ft 10 in (5.13 m) maximum
- Propulsion: 4 × General Motors Model 16-278A V16 diesel engines driving electrical generators; 2 × 126-cell Sargo batteries; 4 × high-speed General Electric electric motors with reduction gears; 2 × propellers; 5,400 shp (4.0 MW) surfaced; 2,740 shp (2.0 MW) submerged
- Speed: 20.25 knots (38 km/h) surfaced; 8.75 knots (16 km/h) submerged
- Range: 11,000 nautical miles (20,000 km) surfaced at 10 knots (19 km/h)
- Endurance: 48 hours at 2 knots (3.7 km/h) submerged; 75 days on patrol
- Test depth: 400 ft (120 m)
- Complement: 10 officers, 70–71 enlisted
- Armament: 10 × 21-inch (533 mm) torpedo tubes; 6 forward, 4 aft; 24 torpedoes; 1 × 5-inch (127 mm) / 25 caliber deck gun; Bofors 40 mm and Oerlikon 20 mm cannon

General characteristics (Guppy II)
- Class & type: none
- Displacement: 1,870 tons (1,900 t) surfaced; 2,440 tons (2,480 t) submerged
- Length: 307 ft (93.6 m)
- Beam: 27 ft 4 in (7.4 m)
- Draft: 17 ft (5.2 m)
- Propulsion: Snorkel added; Batteries upgraded to GUPPY type, capacity expanded to 504 cells (1 × 184 cell, 1 × 68 cell, and 2 × 126 cell batteries); 4 × high-speed electric motors replaced with 2 × low-speed direct drive electric motors
- Speed: Surfaced: 18.0 knots (20.7 mph; 33.3 km/h) maximum; 13.5 knots (15.5 mph; 25.0 km/h) cruising; Submerged: 16.0 knots (18.4 mph; 29.6 km/h) for ½ hour; 9.0 knots (10.4 mph; 16.7 km/h) snorkeling; 3.5 knots (4.0 mph; 6.5 km/h) cruising
- Range: 15,000 nm (28,000 km) surfaced at 11 knots (13 mph; 20 km/h)
- Endurance: 48 hours at 4 knots (5 mph; 7 km/h) submerged
- Complement: 9–10 officers; 5 petty officers; 70 enlisted men
- Sensors & processing systems: WFA active sonar; JT passive sonar; Mk 106 torpedo fire control system
- Armament: 10 × 21 inch (533 mm) torpedo tubes; (six forward, four aft); all guns removed

General characteristics (Guppy III)
- Class & type: none
- Displacement: 1,975 tons (2,007 t) surfaced; 2,450 tons (2,489 t) submerged
- Length: 321 ft (97.8 m)
- Beam: 27 ft 4 in (7.4 m)
- Draft: 17 ft (5.2 m)
- Speed: Surfaced: 17.2 knots (19.8 mph; 31.9 km/h) maximum; 12.2 knots (14.0 mph; 22.6 km/h) cruising; Submerged: 14.5 knots (16.7 mph; 26.9 km/h) for ½ hour; 6.2 knots (7.1 mph; 11.5 km/h) snorkeling; 3.7 knots (4.3 mph; 6.9 km/h) cruising
- Range: 15,900 nm (29,400 km) surfaced at 8.5 knots (10 mph; 16 km/h)
- Endurance: 36 hours at 3 knots (3 mph; 6 km/h) submerged
- Complement: 8–10 officers; 5 petty officers; 70-80 enlisted men
- Sensors & processing systems: BQS-4 active search sonar; BQR-2B passive search sonar; BQG-4 passive attack sonar

USS Corporal (SS-346), a Balao-class submarine, was a ship of the United States Navy named for the corporal, an alternate name for the fallfish, found in streams of the eastern United States.

== Construction and commissioning ==
Corporal was launched 10 June 1945 by Electric Boat Co., Groton, Connecticut, sponsored by Mrs. H. C. Wick; commissioned 9 November 1945, Commander Edward E. Shelby in command; and reported to the Atlantic Fleet.

== Service history ==
Corporal cleared New London 8 January 1946 for her base at Key West, arriving 25 February. She took part in antisubmarine warfare projects and fleet exercises off Florida and Bermuda and in the Caribbean until returning to Groton 26 February 1947. After extensive modernization, she returned to Key West 2 March 1948.

She continued to conduct training and join in exercises off Florida and in the Caribbean until her first tour of duty in the Mediterranean with the 6th Fleet from 16 July 1952 to 15 October. Returning to local operations off Key West, she also participated in large-scale fleet exercises in the Atlantic and Caribbean. She cruised to the British Isles from 11 March to 16 May 1957, and upon her return to Key West, continued training and services to the Fleet Sonar School. Through 1958 and 1959, she operated frequently in ordnance tests, and from August 1959, when Charleston, South Carolina, became her home port, cruised widely along the east coast. In December 1960 Corporal sailed to visit Germany and then join the 6th Fleet in the Mediterranean.

USS Corporal was converted to a Guppy III configuration and continued to operate throughout the 1960s and early 1970s in various capacities during the Cold War. She made regular "Northern" runs across the Arctic Circle above the North Sea, regular "Mediterranean Cruises", frequently operated in the Caribbean and trained submarine sailors in conjunction with the Submarine School in New London, Connecticut.

In 1967 USS Corporal collided in Rhode Island's Block Island Sound with the 30-foot sloop Medea IV, whose owner afterward claimed "they never offered us assistance or asked us if we were damaged."

=== Helicopter landing ===
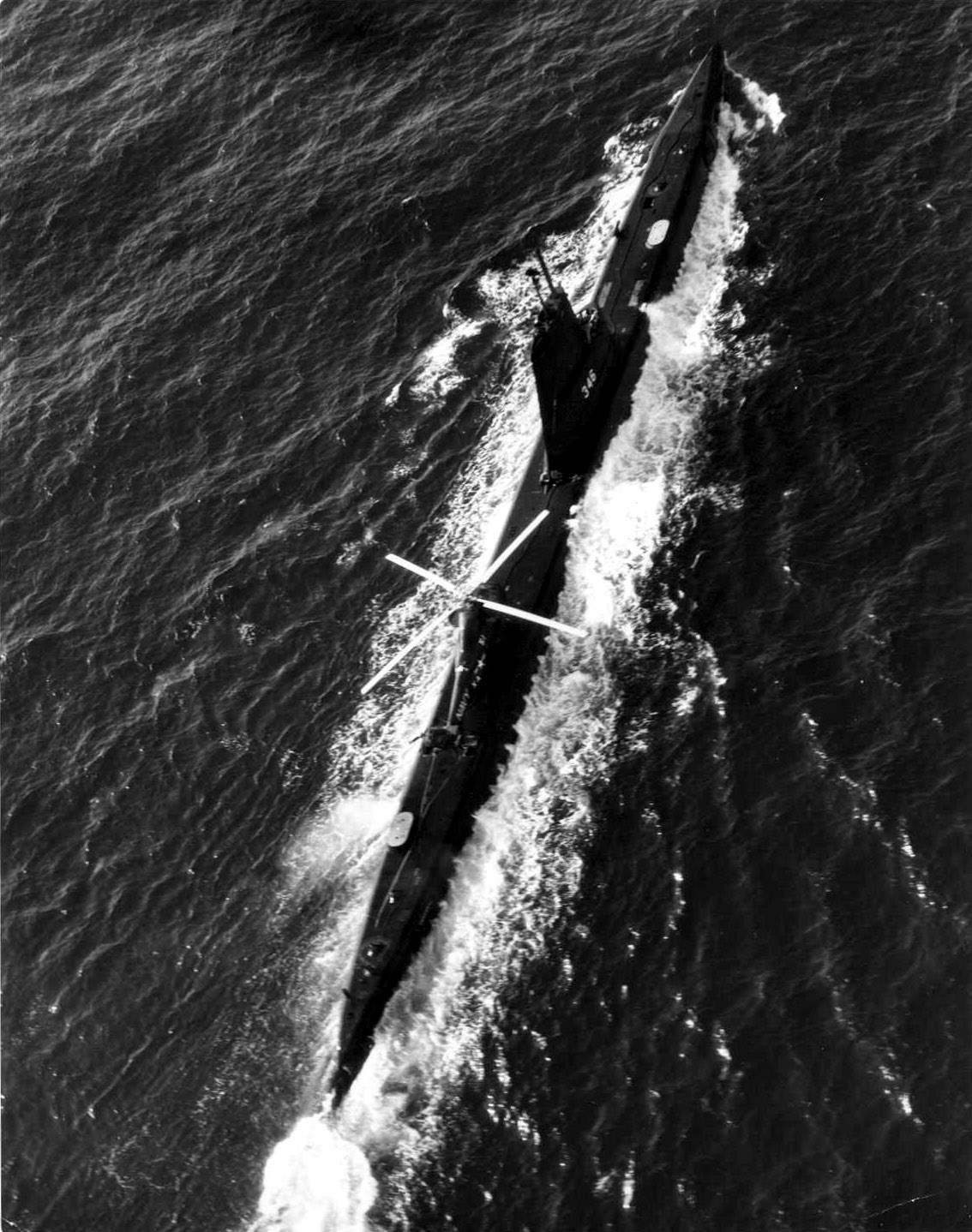
Corporal (SS-346), 1956

During naval exercises off Key West in April 1956, a US Navy Sikorsky H-34 helicopter, serial number 51, made an emergency landing on the Corporal's deck because it experienced serious mechanical problems during an anti-submarine warfare exercise in which the Corporal had been serving as the opposing force. After close cooperation by radio and hasty preparations by the submariners, the distressed helicopter managed to touch down safely aft of the submarine's sail. The incident marked "the first time a helicopter made an emergency landing on a submarine." At the time of that emergency landing, the submarine was under the command of Lieutenant Commander E. O. Proctor, and those aboard the helicopter were Commander W. F. Culley and Lieutenant J. K. Johnson.

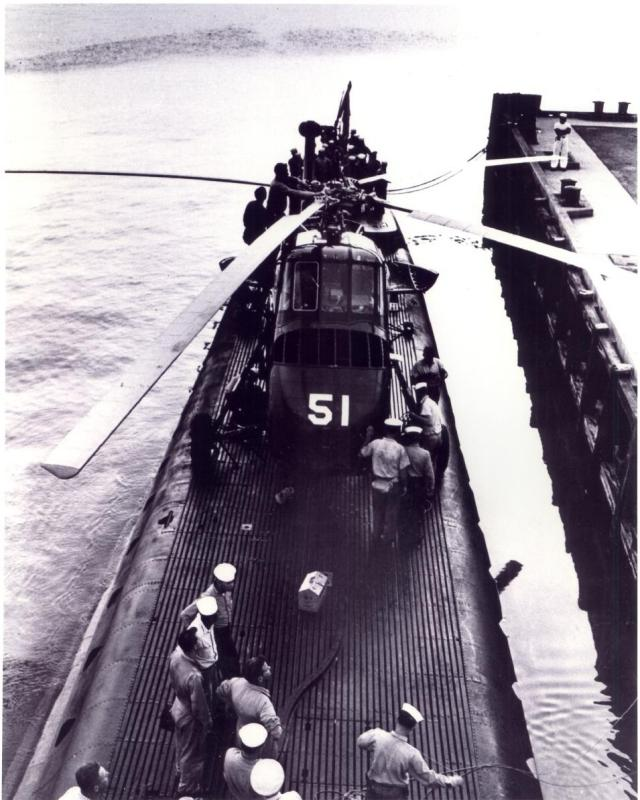
Helicopter on USS Corporal after mechanical trouble

== TCG Ikinci İnönü (S333) ==
She was decommissioned, struck from the US Naval Register, and transferred (sold) to Turkey, under terms of the Security Assistance Program, 28 November 1973. On 12 February 1974 she was commissioned TCG Ikinci İnönü (S333) ("Second İnönü"), the second of three submarines named in honor of the Second Battle of İnönü in the Turkish Independence War.

She was dropped from the Turkish Naval rolls on 2 September 1996, and scrapped. Today, a section of hull containing the stern torpedo tubes is preserved at the Naval Museum at Istanbul.
