= Andrew Carl Bennett =

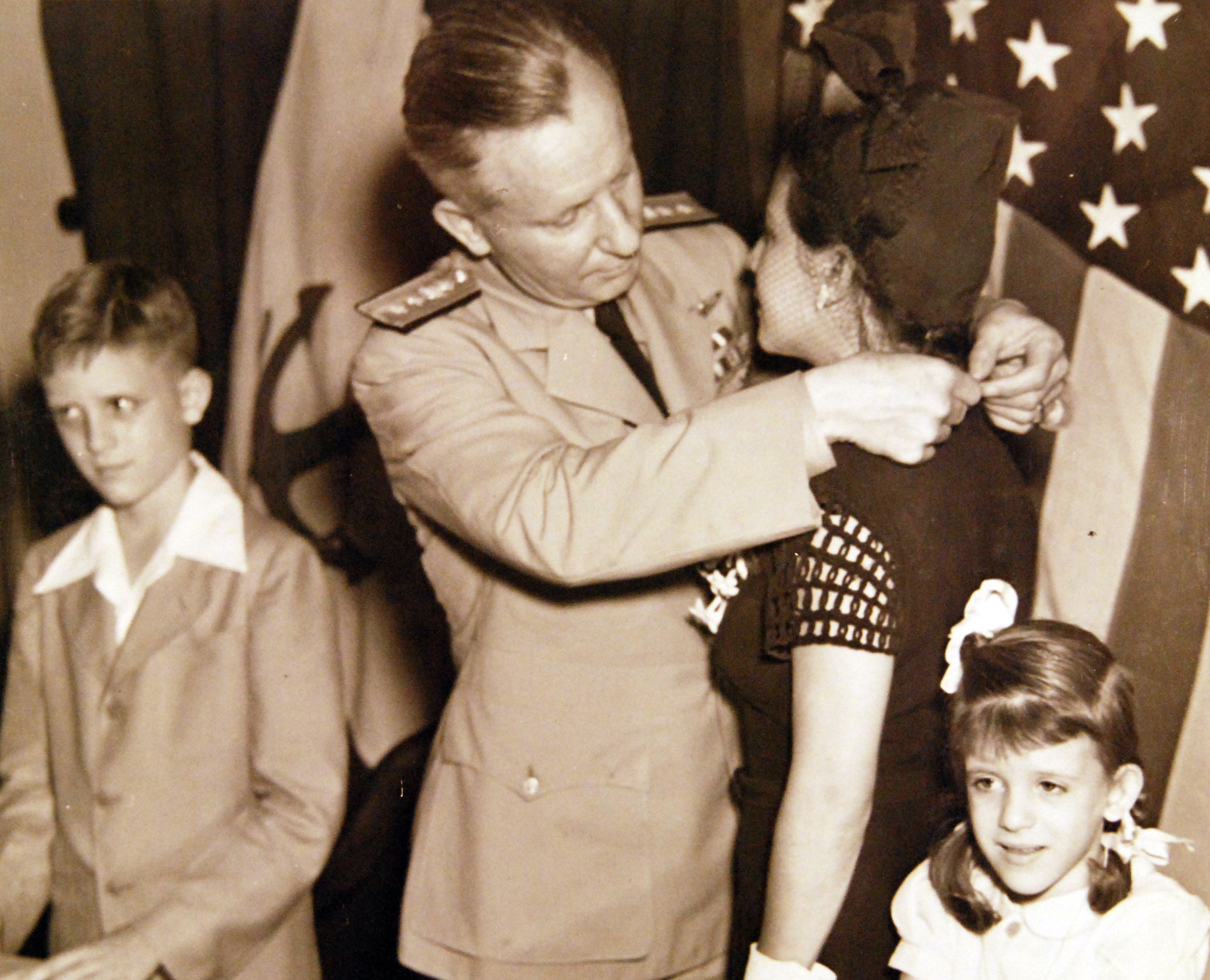
- Bennett bestows the Medal of Honor upon the widow of submarine commander Howard W. Gilmore (1943)
- Born: December 17, 1889; Goodland, Kansas, U.S.
- Died: January 29, 1971 (aged 81)
- Military career
- Rank: Rear Admiral

Andrew Carl Bennett (December 17, 1889 – November 29, 1971) often nicknamed 'A.C. Bennett' was a United States Navy rear admiral (upper half) and United States Naval Submariner. Commissioned from Annapolis in 1912. Commanding Officer of the Submarine L-11 in Irish waters 1917-1918. Commanding Officer of R-24 and S-16 1918-1922. Instructor at Annapolis 1933-1936. Commanding Officer of the Savannah 1940-1942. Rear Admiral in May 1942. Commander of the Advance Group, Amphibious Force July 1942-February 1943 then Navy Operating Base, Iceland in 1943, Rear Adm. Andrew C. Bennett, USN, assumed command as Commandant, Eighth Naval District, on 14 June 1943. He retired as a Rear Admiral in the U.S. Navy in 1946.

Retired in November 1946. Decorations included the Navy Cross and two Legions of Merit.
