= USS Elokomin =

Oiler of the United States Navy

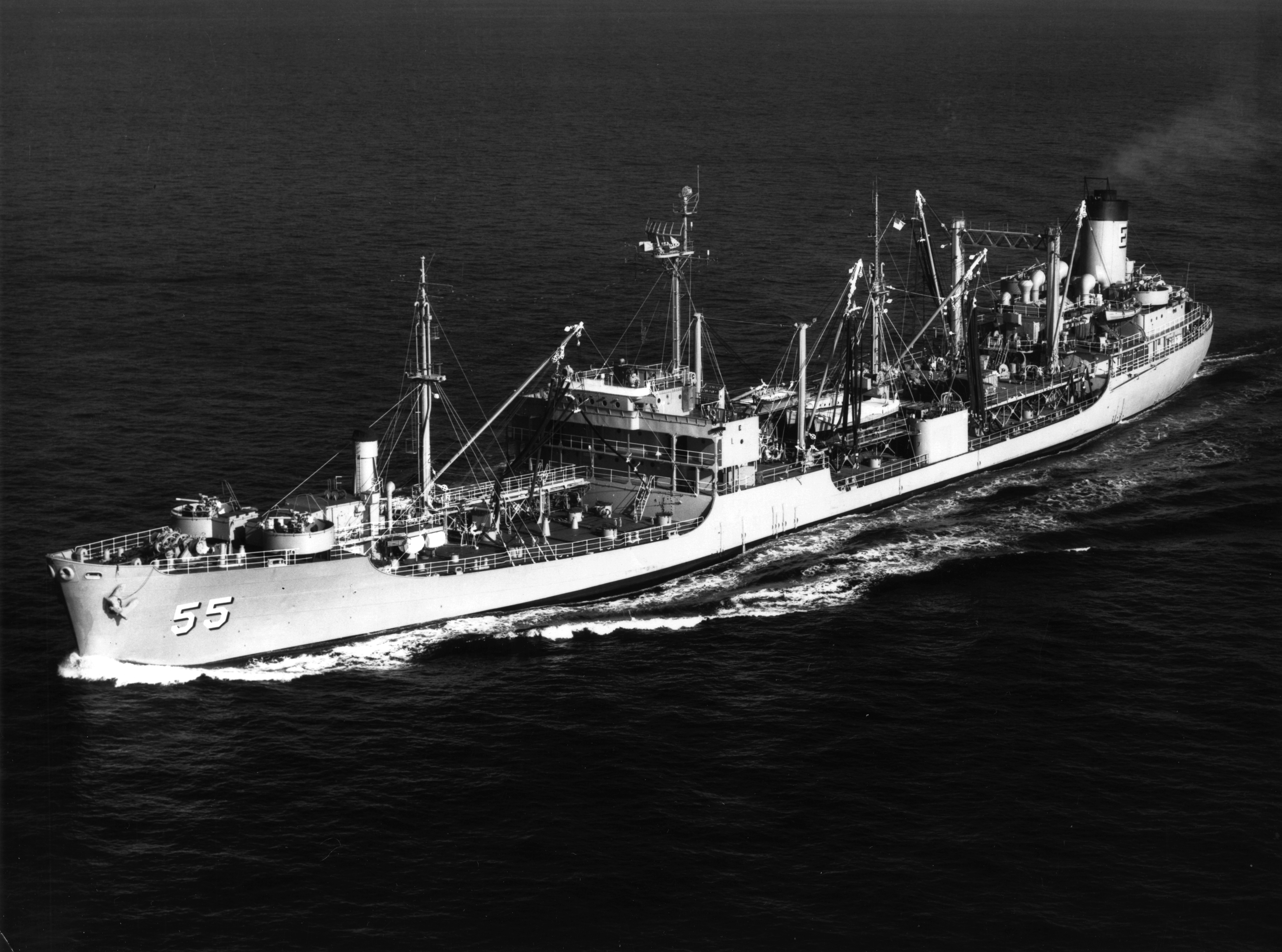

History

United States
- Name: USS Elokomin
- Namesake: Elokomin River in Washington
- Builder: Bethlehem Shipbuilding Corporation, Bethlehem Sparrows Point Shipyard, Sparrows Point, Maryland
- Launched: 19 October 1943
- Sponsored by: Mrs. C. M. Marcey
- Acquired: 30 January 1943
- Commissioned: 30 November 1943
- Decommissioned: March 17, 1970
- Fate: Sold for scrap, 1970

General characteristics
- Class & type: Cimarron-class fleet oiler
- Type: T3-S2-A1 tanker hull
- Displacement: 7,236 long tons (7,352 t) light; 25,440 long tons (25,848 t) full load
- Length: 553 ft (169 m)
- Beam: 75 ft (23 m)
- Draft: 32 ft (9.8 m)
- Propulsion: Geared turbines, twin screws, 30,400 shp (22,669 kW)
- Speed: 18 knots (21 mph; 33 km/h)
- Capacity: 146,000 barrels
- Complement: 314
- Armament: 1 × 5 in (130 mm)/38 cal. gun; 4 × 3 in (76 mm)/50 cal. guns (4×1); 4 × twin 40 mm AA guns; 4 × twin 20 mm AA guns

USS Elokomin (AO-55) was a Cimarron-class fleet oiler acquired by the U.S. Navy during World War II. She served her country primarily in the Atlantic Ocean, Mediterranean Sea, and the North Atlantic Ocean Theatre of Operations, and provided petroleum products where needed to combat ships.

Elokomin was launched on 19 October 1943 by Bethlehem Sparrows Point Shipyard, Sparrows Point, Maryland, under a Maritime Commission contract (MC hull 721); sponsored by Mrs. C. M. Marcey; transferred to the Navy on 30 January 1943; and commissioned on 30 November 1943.

== World War II Atlantic Ocean operations ==
From January to August 1944 Elokomin was almost constantly at sea transporting fuel oil, diesel oil, and gasoline from Gulf ports to Norfolk, Virginia, New York City, Argentia, Newfoundland, and Bermuda. On 2 September she sailed with a convoy for Oran, Algeria, refueling the convoy escorts during the passage and discharging fuel oil to the dock at Oran upon arrival. She reached Bermuda 14 October, and after discharging the remainder of her cargo, returned to Norfolk 4 days later. Two similar voyages were made to Casablanca after which she served as station tanker at Bermuda in March and April 1945.

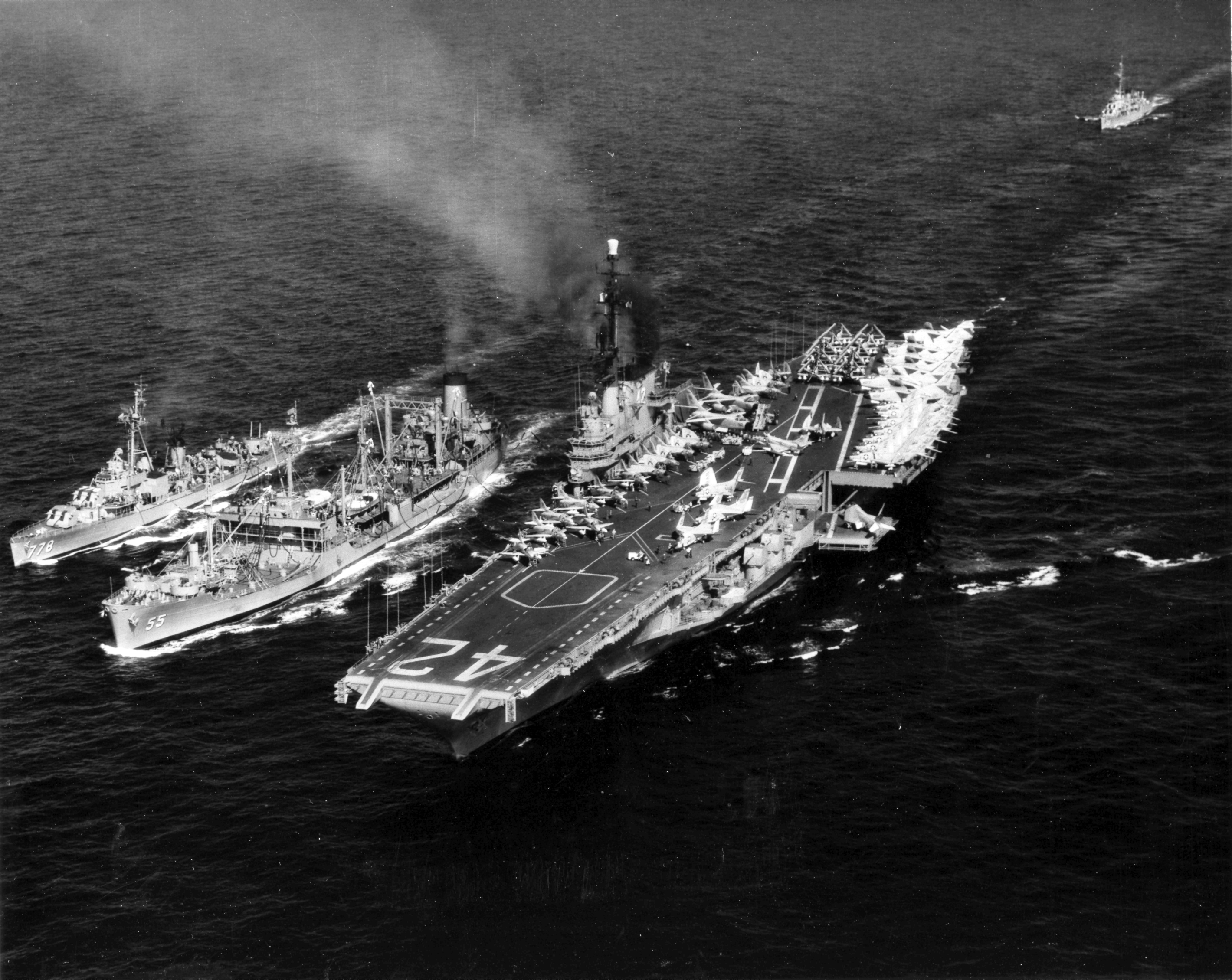
Elokomin refueling USS Franklin D. Roosevelt and USS Massey, April 1959

Elokomin returned to coastwise and Caribbean duty until the end of the war. She continued on active service and from her base at Norfolk, operated mainly along the east coast and on fleet exercises. She alternated this duty with U.S. 6th Fleet tours in the Mediterranean and North Atlantic Treaty Organization exercises in European waters through 1962.

== Decommissioning ==
She was decommissioned and struck from the Naval Vessel Register on unknown dates. She was transferred to the Maritime Administration for lay up in the National Defense Reserve Fleet at another unknown date. Her final disposition was that she was scrapped in 1970.
