= USS Conestoga (AT-54) =

Tugboat of the United States Navy

Coordinates: 37°39′N 122°57′W

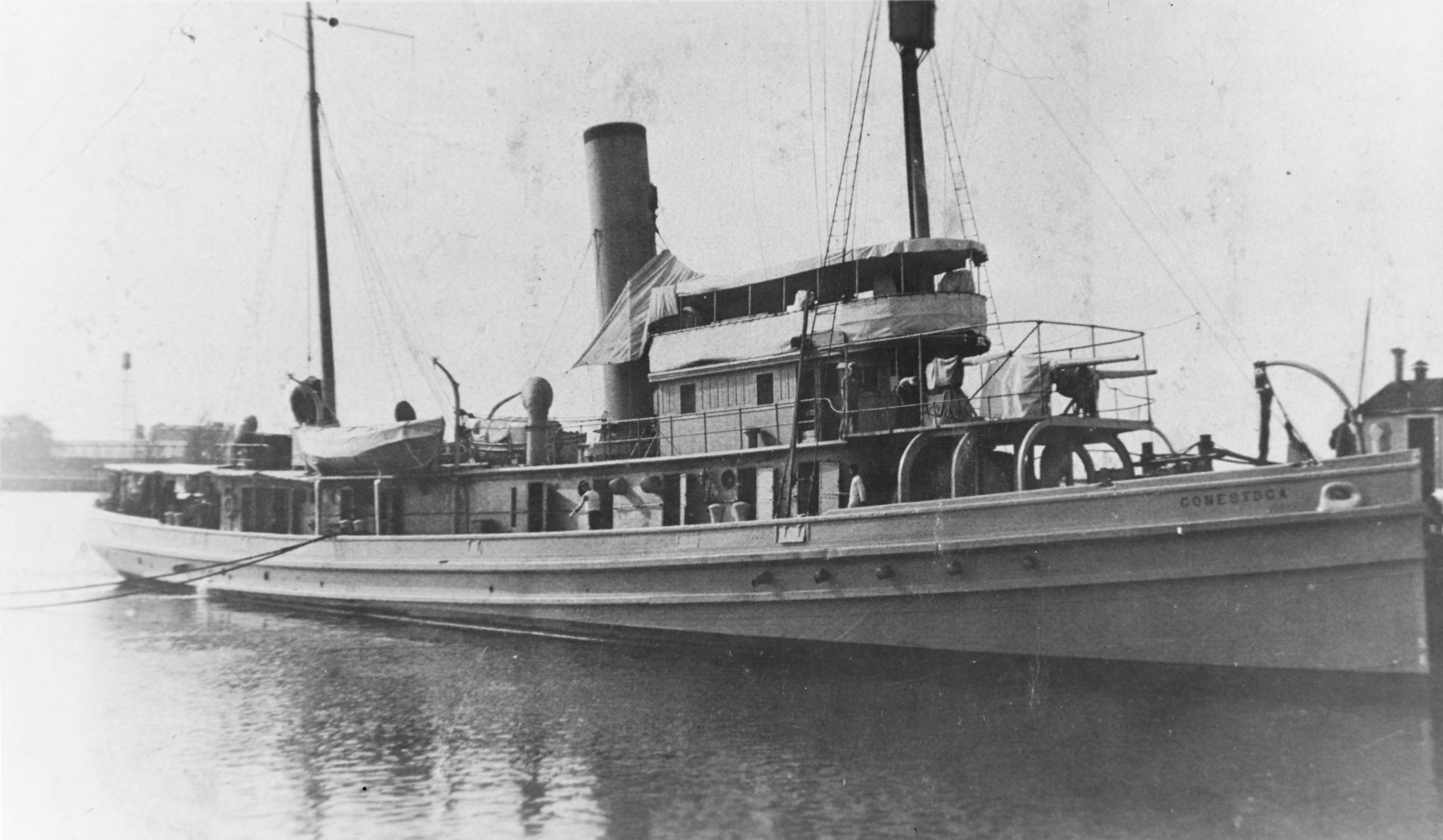
- Conestoga in 1921

History

United States
- Name: Conestoga
- Builder: Maryland Steel Company, Sparrows Point, Maryland, U.S.
- Laid down: 1904
- Acquired: by purchase, 14 September 1917
- Commissioned: 10 November 1917
- Reclassified: AT-54, 17 July 1920
- Fate: Last seen at sea on 25 March 1921, declared lost with all her crew, 30 June 1921 [wreck found 2016]

General characteristics
- Type: Tugboat
- Displacement: 420 long tons (430 t)
- Length: 170 ft (52 m)
- Beam: 29 ft (8.8 m)
- Draft: 15 ft (4.6 m)
- Speed: 13 kn (15 mph; 24 km/h)
- Complement: 56
- Armament: 1 × 3 in (76 mm) gun
- USS Conestoga (shipwreck and remains)
- U.S. National Register of Historic Places
- Location within California Location within the United States
- Location: Pacific Ocean
- Nearest city: San Francisco, California
- Built: 1903
- Architect: Maryland Steel Company
- NRHP reference No.: 16000358
- Added to NRHP: October 6, 2016

The second USS Conestoga (SP-1128/AT-54) was an ocean-going tug in the United States Navy. Commissioned in 1917, it disappeared in the Pacific Ocean in 1921. The fate of the vessel was a mystery until its wreck was positively identified in 2016.

== Construction ==
The tug was built for the Philadelphia and Reading Railway as the Conestoga in 1904 by Maryland Steel Company, Sparrows Point, Maryland. She was purchased on 14 September 1917 for World War I duty and assigned the Section Patrol number SP-1128; she was commissioned on 10 November 1917.

== Service history ==
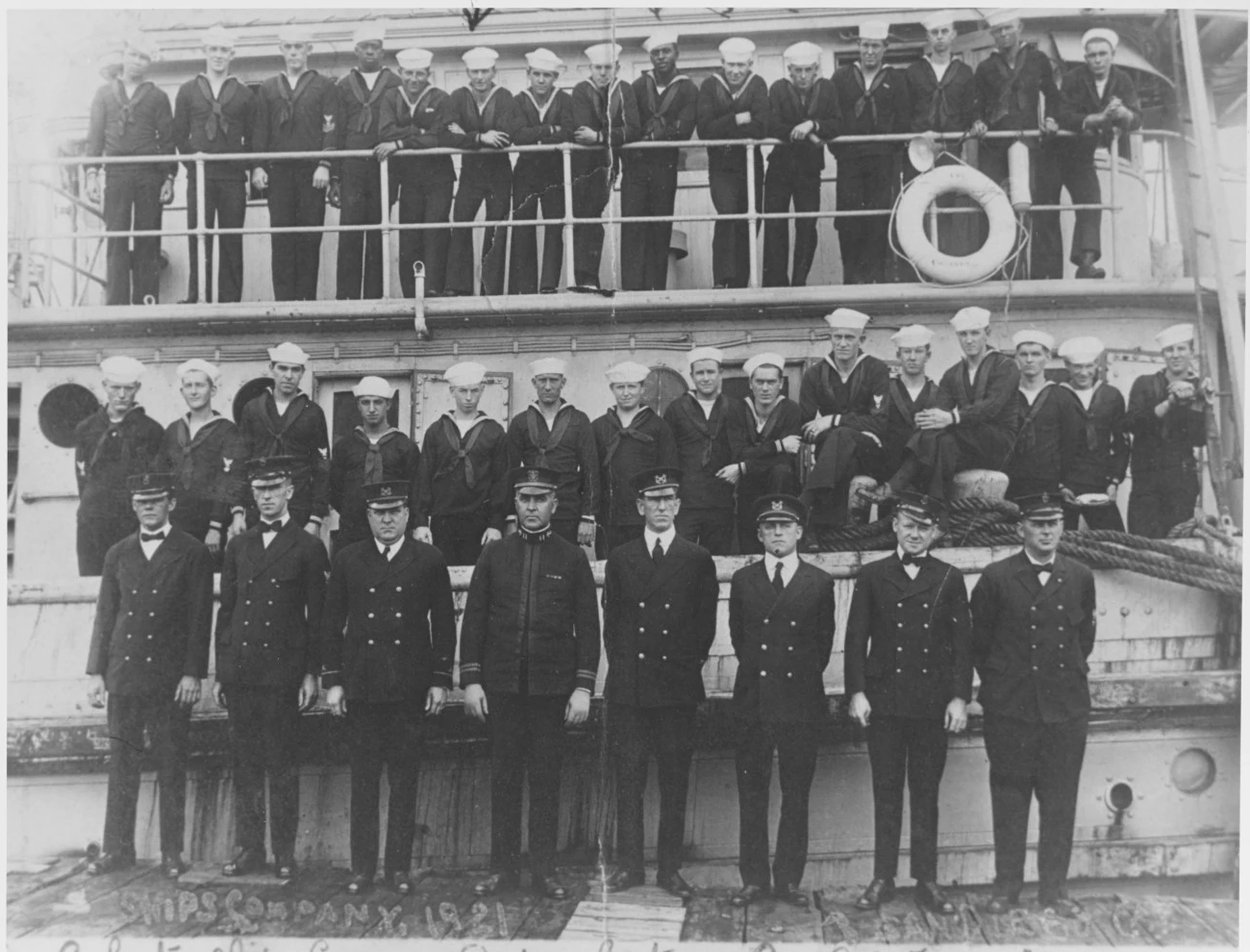
Conestoga's crew in 1921.

Assigned to the Submarine Force, Conestoga carried out towing duties along the Atlantic coast, transported supplies and guns, escorted convoys to Bermuda and the Azores, and cruised with the American Patrol Detachment in the vicinity of the Azores. At the end of the war she was attached to Naval Base No. 13, Azores, from which she towed disabled ships and escorted convoys until her arrival at New York on 26 September 1919. She was then assigned to harbor tug duty in the 5th Naval District at Norfolk, Virginia.

Conestoga (which had received the hull number AT-54 in July 1920) went to the Pacific in late 1920. She was at San Diego, California, and Mare Island, California, during the first three months of 1921. On 25 March of that year, the tug steamed out of Mare Island, with a barge of coal sailing via Pearl Harbor to take up an assignment as station ship at Tutuila, American Samoa.

Commanded by Lt. Ernest Larkin Jones, Conestoga was not heard from again. Despite an extensive search, the only trace found of her at the time of her loss was a lifeboat bearing the initial letter of her name found near Manzanillo, Mexico.

== Rediscovery ==
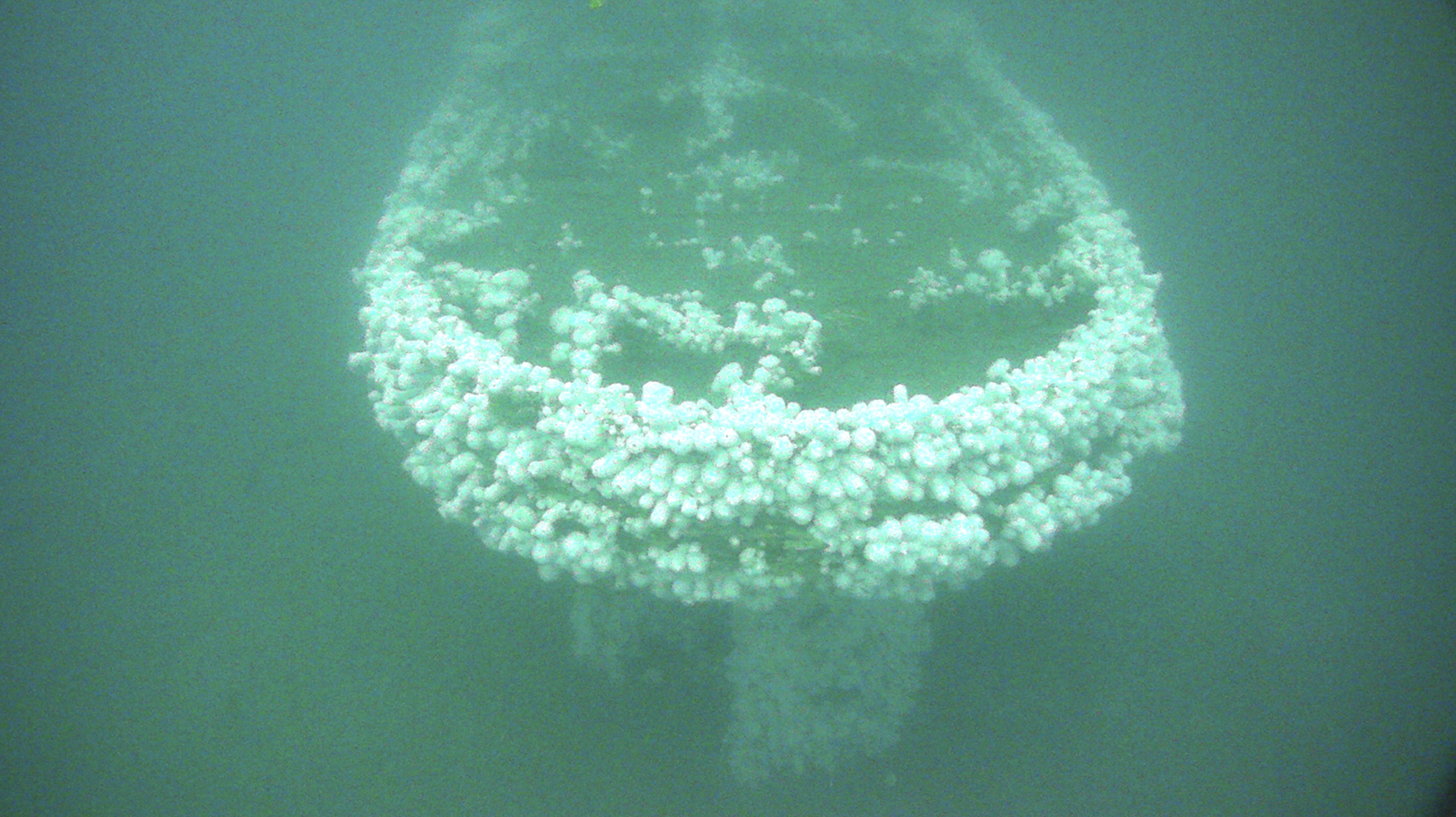
Stern view of the shipwreck, colonized with sea anemones.

Her wreck was discovered in 2009, as an unidentified shipwreck in the Greater Farallones National Marine Sanctuary, a few miles from Southeast Farallon Island, just off the coast of San Francisco, California. In October 2015, a joint NOAA and Navy mission confirmed the wreck was the Conestoga and on 23 March 2016, 95 years after the ship was lost, a formal announcement was made. The shipwreck was listed on the National Register of Historic Places in 2016.

== See also ==
- USS R-14, a submarine sent to search for the ship
