= USS R-14 =

R-class submarine of the United States

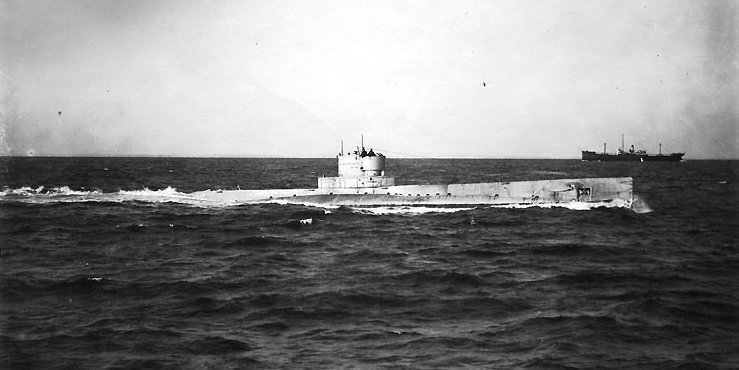
- USS R-14 underway, probably during sea trials in late 1919 or early 1920, her deck gun has not yet been installed

History

United States
- Name: R-14
- Ordered: 29 August 1916
- Builder: Fore River Shipbuilding Company, Quincy, Massachusetts
- Cost: $597,517.01 (hull and machinery)
- Laid down: 6 November 1918
- Launched: 10 October 1919
- Sponsored by: Miss Florence Loomis Gardner
- Commissioned: 24 December 1919
- Decommissioned: 14 September 1945
- Stricken: 11 October 1945
- Identification: Hull symbol: SS-91 (17 July 1920); Call sign: NILT
- Fate: Sold for scrap, 28 September 1945

General characteristics
- Class & type: R-1-class submarine
- Displacement: 574 long tons (583 t) surfaced; 685 long tons (696 t) submerged
- Length: 186 feet 3 inches (56.77 m)
- Beam: 18 ft (5.5 m)
- Draft: 15 ft 6 in (4.72 m)
- Installed power: 880 brake horsepower (656 kW) diesel; 934 hp (696 kW) electric
- Propulsion: 2 × NELSECO 6-EB-14 diesel engines; 2 × Electro-Dynamic Company electric motors; 2 × 60-cell batteries; 3 x Improvised sails (1921, temporarily); 2 × Propellers
- Speed: 12.5 knots (23.2 km/h; 14.4 mph) surfaced; 9.3 kn (17.2 km/h; 10.7 mph) submerged; 2.0 kn (3.7 km/h; 2.3 mph) sail
- Range: 4,700 nautical miles (8,700 km; 5,400 mi) at 6.2 kn (11.5 km/h; 7.1 mph), 7,000 nmi (13,000 km; 8,100 mi) if fuel loaded into the main ballast tanks
- Test depth: 200 ft (61 m)
- Capacity: 18,880 US gallons (71,500 L; 15,720 imp gal) fuel
- Complement: 2 officers; 27 enlisted
- Armament: 4 × 21-inch (533 mm) torpedo tubes (8 torpedoes); 1 × 3-inch (76 mm)/50-caliber deck gun

USS R-14 (SS-91), also known as "Submarine No. 91", was an R-1-class coastal and harbor defense submarines of the United States Navy commissioned after the end of World War I.

Due to space constraints, the boats built at the Fore River Shipbuilding Company yard, were laid down much later than the boats built at the Union Iron Works and the Lake Torpedo Boat Company yards. Because of this, none were commissioned before the end of WWI.

== Design ==
The R-boats built by the Fore River Shipbuilding Company, R-1 through R-14, and the Union Iron Works, R-15 through R-20, are sometimes considered a separate class, R-1-class, from those built by the Lake Torpedo Boat Company, R-21 through R-27, R-21-class.

The submarines had a length of 186 feet 3 inches (56.8 m) overall, a beam of 18 ft (5.5 m), and a mean draft of 15 ft 6 in (4.7 m). They displaced 574 long tons (583 t) on the surface and 685 long tons (696 t) submerged. The R-1-class submarines had a crew of 2 officers and 27 enlisted men. They had a diving depth of 200 ft (61.0 m).

For surface running, the boats were powered by two 440-brake-horsepower (328 kW) NELSECO 6-EB-14 diesel engines, each driving one propeller shaft. When submerged each propeller was driven by a 467-horsepower (348 kW) Electro-Dynamic Company electric motor. They could reach 12.5 knots (23.2 km/h; 14.4 mph) on the surface and 9.3 kn (17.2 km/h; 10.7 mph) underwater. On the surface, the R-1-class had a range of 4,700 nautical miles (8,700 km; 5,400 mi) at 6.2 kn (11.5 km/h; 7.1 mph), or 7,000 nmi (13,000 km; 8,100 mi) if fuel was loaded into their main ballast tanks.

The boats were armed with four 21-inch (533 mm) torpedo tubes in the bow. They carried four reloads, for a total of eight torpedoes. The R-1-class submarines were also armed with a single 3 in (76 mm)/50 caliber deck gun.

== Construction ==
R-14's keel was laid down by the Fore River Shipbuilding Company, in Quincy, Massachusetts, on 6 November 1918. She was launched on 10 October 1919, sponsored by Miss Florence Loomis Gardner, and commissioned on 24 December 1919.

== Service history ==
=== 1919–1929 ===
After a shakedown cruise off the New England coast, R-14 moved to Naval Submarine Base New London, in Groton, Connecticut, where she prepared for transfer to the Pacific Fleet. In May 1920, she headed south.

When the US Navy adopted its hull classification system on 17 July 1920, she received the hull number SS-91.

She transited the Panama Canal in July, and arrived at Pearl Harbor, in the Territory of Hawaii, on 6 September 1920. For the next nine years, R-14 assisted in the development of submarine warfare and anti-submarine warfare tactics, and participated in search and rescue operations.

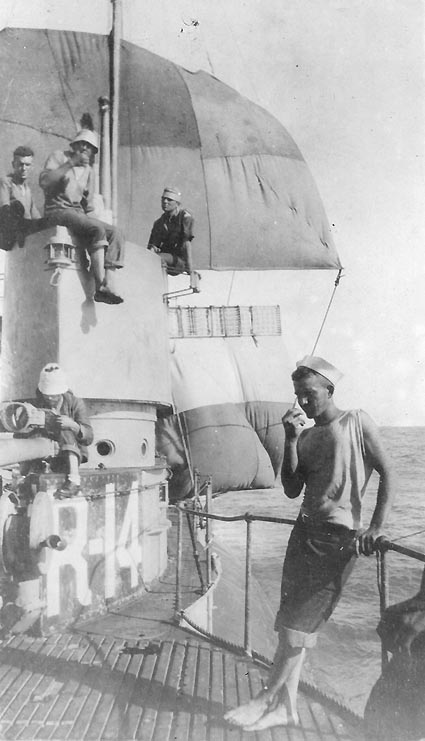
Seen here are the jury-rigged sails used to bring R-14 back to port in 1921; the mainsail rigged from the radio mast is the top sail in the photograph, and the mizzen made of eight blankets also is visible. R-14's acting commanding officer, Lieutenant Alexander Dean Douglas, USN, is at top left, without a hat.(Source: US Naval Historical Center). (Note: The man in the foreground of the photograph is Seaman First Class Raymond R. Suess from Minneapolis, Minnesota. Though the copy shown of this photo is from the National Archives and in the public domain, the original copy of the photograph has been in the possession of the Suess family until recently and is now in private hands. Johnston & Hedman, pg. xvii, 63)

R-14, under acting command of Lieutenant Alexander Dean Douglas, ran out of usable fuel due to seawater contamination, and lost radio communications on 10 May 1921, while on a surface search mission for the seagoing tug Conestoga, about 140 nautical miles (259 km; 161 mi) southeast of the island of Hawaii. Since R-14's electric motors did not have enough battery power to propel her to Hawaii, the ship's officers and chief petty officers came up with a novel solution to the problem. It was decided they should try to sail the submarine to the port of Hilo, Hawaii. A foresail was made of eight hammocks hung from a top boom made of pipe bunk frames lashed firmly together, all tied to the vertical kingpost of the torpedo loading crane forward of the submarine's fairwater. Seeing that this gave R-14 a speed of about 1 kn (1.9 km/h; 1.2 mph), as well as rudder control, a mainsail was made of six blankets, hung from the sturdy radio mast (the top sail in the photograph). This added another 0.5 kn (0.9 km/h; 0.6 mph) to the speed. A mizzen was then made of eight blankets hung from another top boom made of bunk frames, all tied to the vertically placed boom of the torpedo loading crane. This sail added another 0.5 kn. Around 12:30, on 12 May 1921, the crew was able to begin charging the submarine's batteries by dragging the propellers through the water while under sail. The windmill effect of these slowly turning propellers turned the generators providing a small amount of voltage that was directed to the batteries. The crew worked together to solve their various problems, and the boat sailed slowly for Hilo. After 64 hours under sail, at slightly varying speeds, R-14 entered Hilo Harbor, under battery propulsion, on the morning of 15 May 1921. Douglas received a letter of commendation for the crew's innovative actions from his submarine division commander, Commander Chester W. Nimitz, USN.

=== 1930–1946 ===
On 12 December 1930, R-14 departed Pearl Harbor, for the last time, and headed back to the Atlantic. Proceeding via San Diego, California, and the Panama Canal, she returned to New London, on 9 February 1931, and through the end of the 1930s, conducted training exercises for the Submarine School.

In the spring of 1941, she moved down the East Coast to Key West, Florida, her home port as of 1 June 1941. In the fall of 1941, she returned to New London, for overhaul, and on 22 November 1941, resumed operations from Key West.

On 29 June 1943, United States Army Coast Artillery Corps guns at Fort Zachary Taylor mistook R-14 for a German U-boat and opened fire on her while she was off Key West, but she suffered no damage.

Into April 1945, she conducted training exercises for the Sound School, and patrolled the Yucatán Channel and the Florida Straits.

== Fate ==
On 25 April 1945, R-14 departed Key West, and headed north, and in early May 1945, she arrived at the Philadelphia Navy Yard. She was decommissioned on 7 May 1945, struck from the Naval Vessel Register on 19 May 1945, and sold on 28 September 1945, to Rossoff Brothers, of New York City. She was later resold to the Northern Metal Company of Philadelphia, and was scrapped in 1946.

== Awards ==
- American Defense Service Medal
- American Campaign Medal
- World War II Victory Medal

== Bibliography ==
- "Table 21 - Ships on Navy List June 30, 1919". Congressional Serial Set. U.S. Government Printing Office: 770. 1921.
- Friedman, Norman (1995). U.S. Submarines Through 1945: An Illustrated Design History. Annapolis, Maryland: Naval Institute Press. ISBN 1-55750-263-3.
- Priolo, Gary. "R-14 (SS-91)". Navsource.net.
- Gardiner, Robert & Gray, Randal (1985). Conway's All the World's Fighting Ships 1906–1921. Annapolis, Maryland: Naval Institute Press. ISBN 0-85177-245-5.
- "R-14". Dictionary of American Naval Fighting Ships. Navy Department, Naval History and Heritage Command. This article incorporates text from this source, which is in the public domain.
- Hall, Anne Martin (1925). Ships of the United States navy and their sponsors, 1913-1923.
- Johnston, David L.; Hedman, Ric (11 October 2022). A Good and Favorable Wind: The Unusual Story of a Submarine Under Sail and its Cautionary Lessons for the Modern Navy. Nimble Books LLC. ISBN 978-1-60888-200-7.
- Hinman, Charles R.; Campbell, Douglas E. (2019). The Submarine Has No Friends: Friendly Fire Incidents Involving U.S. Submarines During World War II. Syneca Research Group, Inc. ISBN 978-0-359-76906-3.
