= Fleet Sonar School =

The Fleet Sonar School was a United States Navy facility located at Naval Station Key West, Florida, for the training of service personnel in sonar techniques and equipment, and antisubmarine warfare.

The facility opened in 1940, after personnel were transferred from the existing Atlantic Fleet Sound School in New London, Connecticut, which had opened in 1939. The school was invaluable for training sonar operators for the country's struggle against German U-boats a few years later, followed by training in the tracking of Soviet Navy submarines during the Cold War. While nearby Naval Air Station Key West remained an active installation, Naval Station Key West was closed in 1974 as part of a nationwide reduction of stateside military bases following the end of the war in Vietnam, with about half of its acreage absorbed into the claimancy of the naval air station as the Naval Air Station Key West/Truman Annex. With this closure, the mission of the Fleet Sonar School was absorbed by other commands in the U.S. Navy's shore establishment.
