= USS R-21 =

R-class submarine of the United States

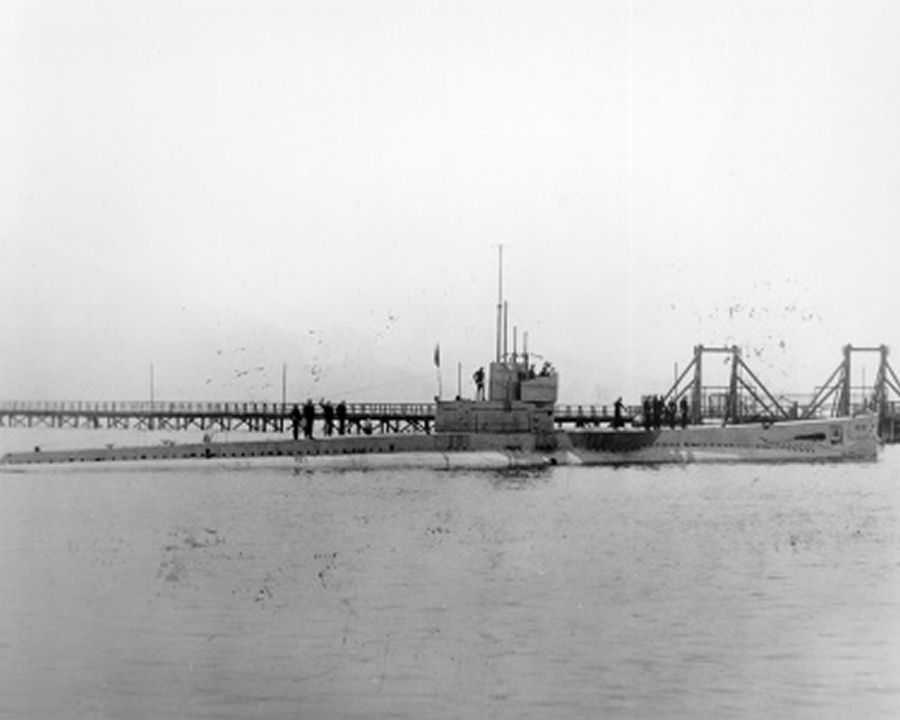
- USS R-21 off the Lake Torpedo Boat Company shipyard, Bridgeport, Connecticut in 1919, when first commissioned,her deck gun has not yet been fitted

History

United States
- Name: R-21
- Ordered: 29 August 1916
- Builder: Lake Torpedo Boat Company, Bridgeport, Connecticut
- Cost: $913,246.21 (hull and machinery)
- Laid down: 19 April 1917
- Launched: 10 July 1918
- Sponsored by: Mrs. May Laizure
- Commissioned: 17 June 1919
- Decommissioned: 21 June 1924
- Stricken: 9 May 1930
- Identification: Hull symbol: SS-98 (17 July 1920); Call sign: NILV
- Fate: Sold for scrap, 30 July 1930

General characteristics
- Class & type: R-21-class submarine
- Displacement: 497 long tons (505 t) surfaced; 652 long tons (662 t) submerged
- Length: 175 feet (53 m)
- Beam: 16 ft 7 in (5.05 m)
- Draft: 13 ft 11 in (4.24 m)
- Installed power: 1,000 brake horsepower (746 kW) diesel; 800 hp (597 kW) electric
- Propulsion: 2 × Busch-Sulzer diesel engines; 2 × Diehl Manufacture Company electric motors; 1 × 120-cell batteries; 2 × Propellers
- Speed: 14 knots (26 km/h; 16 mph) surfaced; 11 kn (20 km/h; 13 mph) submerged
- Range: 3,523 nautical miles (6,525 km; 4,054 mi) at 11 kn (20 km/h; 13 mph), 6,499 nmi (12,036 km; 7,479 mi) if fuel loaded into the main ballast tanks
- Test depth: 200 ft (61 m)
- Capacity: 17,922 US gallons (67,840 L; 14,923 imp gal) fuel
- Complement: 3 officers; 23 enlisted
- Armament: 4 × 21-inch (533 mm) torpedo tubes (8 torpedoes); 1 × 3-inch (76 mm)/50-caliber deck gun

USS R-21 (SS-98), also known as "Submarine No. 98", was an R-21-class coastal and harbor defense submarines of the United States Navy commissioned after the end of World War I.

== Design ==
The R-boats built by the Lake Torpedo Boat Company, R-21 through R-27, are sometimes considered a separate class, R-21-class, from those built by the Fore River Shipbuilding Company, R-1 through R-14, and the Union Iron Works, R-15 through R-20, R-1-class.

The submarines had a length of 175 feet (53.3 m) overall, a beam of 16 ft 7 in (5.1 m), and a mean draft of 13 ft 11 in (4.2 m). They displaced 497 long tons (505 t) on the surface and 652 long tons (662 t) submerged. The R-21-class submarines had a crew of 3 officers and 23 enlisted men. They had a diving depth of 200 ft (61.0 m).

For surface running, the boats were powered by two 500-brake-horsepower (373 kW) Busch-Sulzer diesel engines, each driving one propeller shaft. When submerged each propeller was driven by a 400-horsepower (298 kW) Diehl Manufacture Company electric motor. They could reach 14 knots (26 km/h; 16 mph) on the surface and 11 kn (20 km/h; 13 mph) underwater. On the surface, the R-21-class had a range of 3,523 nautical miles (6,525 km; 4,054 mi) at 11 kn (20 km/h; 13 mph), or 6,499 nmi (12,036 km; 7,479 mi) if fuel was loaded into their main ballast tanks.

The boats were armed with four 21-inch (533 mm) torpedo tubes in the bow. They carried four reloads, for a total of eight torpedoes. The R-21-class submarines were also armed with a single 3 in (76 mm)/50 caliber deck gun.

== Construction ==
R-21's keel was laid down on 19 April 1917, by the Lake Torpedo Boat Company, in Bridgeport, Connecticut. She was launched on 10 July 1918, sponsored by Mrs. May Laizure, and commissioned on 17 June 1919.

== Service history ==
Attached to Submarine Division 1, R-21 operated out of the submarine base, at Groton, Connecticut. She conducted diving and approach tactical training in Long Island Sound, and conducted several training cruises in the vicinity of Block Island, with other units of the division. Following a recruiting cruise, to New Haven, Connecticut, and Bridgeport, from 20 August to 27 August 1919, she returned to New London, for upkeep.

R-21 continued practice dives off the coast into the fall with a call at the Torpedo Station, Newport, Rhode Island, on 21 October 1919. She departed New London, on 1 November, in company with R-22, R-24, R-27, and Eagle No. 31. Proceeding via Hampton Roads, Wilmington, North Carolina, Savannah, Georgia, Key West, Florida, Havana, Cienfuegos, and Guantanamo Bay, Cuba; and Kingston, Jamaica, she arrived at Coco Solo, in the Panama Canal Zone, on 11 December 1919.

Following several practice dives out of Coco Solo, she transited the Panama Canal, on 27 January 1920, for drydock work at Balboa. Returning to Coco Solo, R-21 continued to refine her diving, approach, and torpedo tactics through the spring and summer. During two trips to Almirante Bay, 30 March-2 April and 17–20 May, she practiced with other units of the first division.

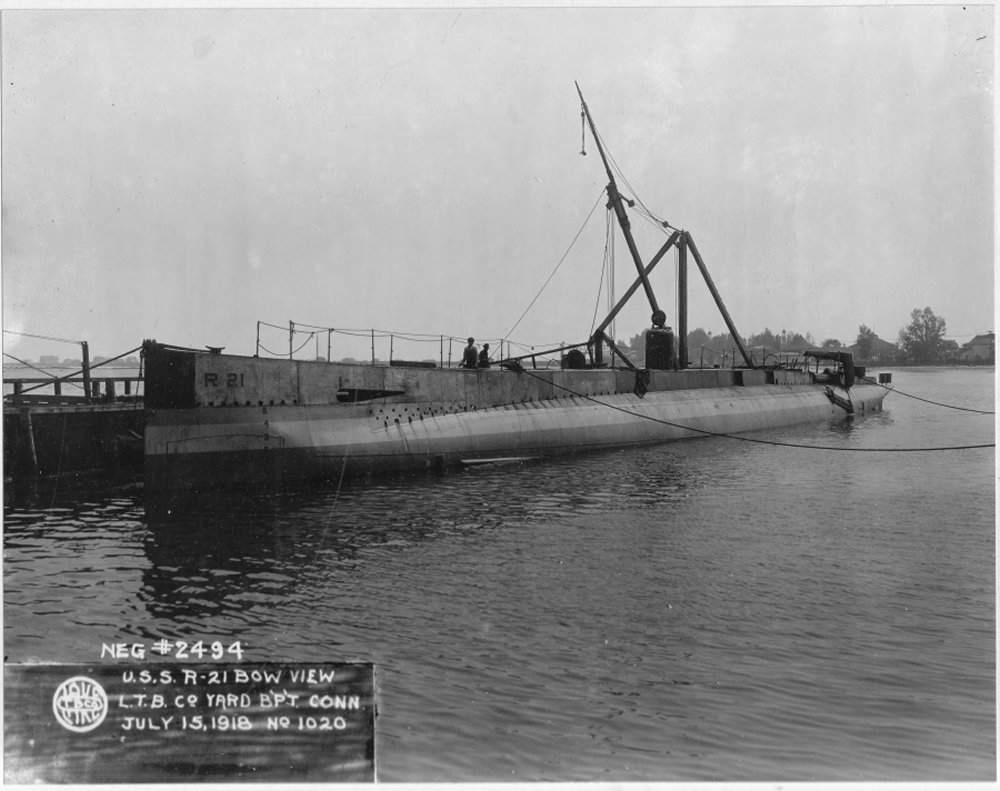
R-21 under construction, 15 July 1918

When the US Navy adopted its hull classification system on 17 July 1920, she received the hull number SS-98.

R-21 again transited the canal, to Balboa, 27 September 1920, for a month in drydock. Upon returning to Coco Solo, she was laid up for 11 months of extensive overhaul. She sailed north, on 26 September 1921, via Guantanamo Bay, Key West, and New York City, arriving New London, on 27 October. She sailed to Portsmouth, New Hampshire, on 27 December 1920, for refitting.

A successful test dive on 26 May 1922, meant that R-21 could return to New London. Through the spring and summer months she operated out of New London and Newport.

The boats of Submarine Division 1, sailed from New London, on 2 October 1922, for Coco Solo. R-21 served as flagboat as the vessels cruised via Hampton Roads, and Guantanamo. After 11 days out, R-24 developed engine trouble and was temporarily taken under tow by R-21. The Cuba-bound steamer SS Bethore rendered assistance, and R-21 arrived at Coco Solo, on 27 October 1922.

R-21 spent the rest of her active Navy days operating out of Coco Solo, and undergoing repairs at Balboa. She sailed from Coco Solo, for the last time, 15 February 1923, with the minesweeper Quail (AM-15), acting as tender, and eight other submarines. Two days later R-21's engines malfunctioned and she was towed into Guantanamo, by the tender. Repairs were quickly accomplished and R-21 sailed for the Philadelphia Navy Yard, on 22 February, arriving there via Charleston, South Carolina, on 9 November 1923.

== Fate ==
Decommissioned at the Philadelphia Navy Yard, on 21 June 1924, R-21 was struck from the Naval Vessel Register on 9 May 1930, and sold for scrap, on 30 July 1930.

== Bibliography ==
- "Table 21 - Ships on Navy List June 30, 1919". Congressional Serial Set. U.S. Government Printing Office: 770. 1921.
- Friedman, Norman (1995). U.S. Submarines Through 1945: An Illustrated Design History. Annapolis, Maryland: Naval Institute Press. ISBN 1-55750-263-3.
- Priolo, Gary. "R-21 (SS-98)". Navsource.net.
- Gardiner, Robert & Gray, Randal (1985). Conway's All the World's Fighting Ships 1906–1921. Annapolis, Maryland: Naval Institute Press. ISBN 0-85177-245-5.
- "R-21". Dictionary of American Naval Fighting Ships. Navy Department, Naval History and Heritage Command. This article incorporates text from this source, which is in the public domain.
- Hall, Anne Martin (1925). Ships of the United States navy and their sponsors, 1913-1923.
