= USS R-1 =

R-class submarine of the United States

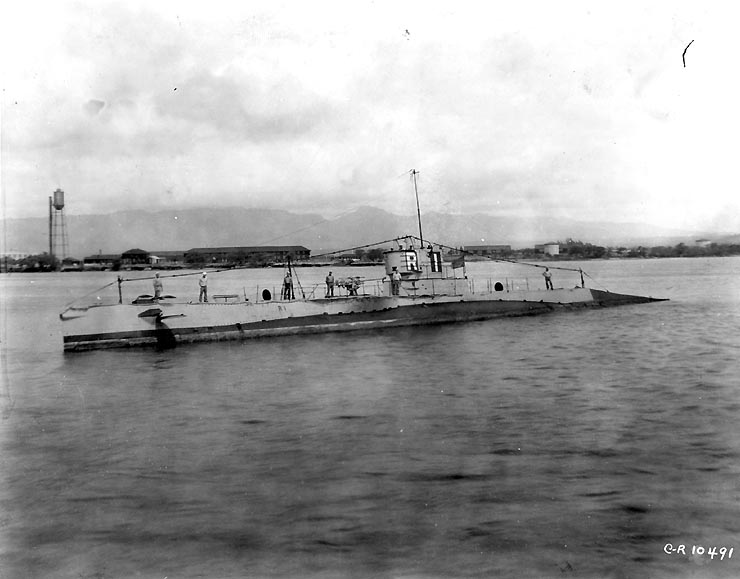
- USS R-1 at Pearl Harbor Navy Yard, c. 1923-1930

History

United States
- Name: R-1
- Ordered: 29 August 1916
- Builder: Fore River Shipbuilding Company, Quincy, Massachusetts
- Cost: $778,144.26 (hull and machinery)
- Laid down: 16 October 1917
- Launched: 24 August 1918
- Sponsored by: Mrs. Margaret Dashiell
- Commissioned: 16 December 1918
- Decommissioned: 1 May 1931
- Recommissioned: 16 October 1940
- Decommissioned: 20 September 1945
- Stricken: 10 November 1945
- Identification: Hull symbol: SS-78 (17 July 1920); Call sign: NILC
- Fate: Sold for scrap, 13 March 1946

General characteristics
- Class & type: R-1-class submarine
- Displacement: 574 long tons (583 t) surfaced; 685 long tons (696 t) submerged
- Length: 186 feet 3 inches (56.77 m)
- Beam: 18 ft (5.5 m)
- Draft: 15 ft 6 in (4.72 m)
- Installed power: 880 brake horsepower (656 kW) diesel; 934 hp (696 kW) electric
- Propulsion: 2 × NELSECO 6-EB-14 diesel engines; 2 × Electro-Dynamic Company electric motors; 2 × 60-cell batteries; 2 × Propellers
- Speed: 12.5 knots (23.2 km/h; 14.4 mph) surfaced; 9.3 kn (17.2 km/h; 10.7 mph) submerged
- Range: 4,700 nautical miles (8,700 km; 5,400 mi) at 6.2 kn (11.5 km/h; 7.1 mph), 7,000 nmi (13,000 km; 8,100 mi) if fuel loaded into the main ballast tanks
- Test depth: 200 ft (61 m)
- Capacity: 18,880 US gallons (71,500 L; 15,720 imp gal) fuel
- Complement: 2 officers; 27 enlisted
- Armament: 4 × 21-inch (533 mm) torpedo tubes (8 torpedoes); 1 × 3-inch (76 mm)/50-caliber deck gun

USS R-1 (SS-78), also known as "Submarine No. 78", was the lead ship of the R-1-class coastal and harbor defense submarines of the United States Navy commissioned shortly after the end of World War I.

Due to space constraints, the boats built at the Fore River Shipbuilding Company yard, were laid down much later than the boats built at the Union Iron Works and the Lake Torpedo Boat Company yards. Because of this, none were commissioned before the end of WWI.

== Design ==
The R-boats built by the Fore River Shipbuilding Company, R-1 through R-14, and the Union Iron Works, R-15 through R-20, are sometimes considered a separate class, R-1-class, from those built by the Lake Torpedo Boat Company, R-21 through R-27, R-21-class.

The submarines had a length of 186 feet 3 inches (56.8 m) overall, a beam of 18 ft (5.5 m), and a mean draft of 15 ft 6 in (4.7 m). They displaced 574 long tons (583 t) on the surface and 685 long tons (696 t) submerged. The R-1-class submarines had a crew of 2 officers and 27 enlisted men. They had a diving depth of 200 ft (61.0 m).

For surface running, the boats were powered by two 440-brake-horsepower (328 kW) NELSECO 6-EB-14 diesel engines, each driving one propeller shaft. When submerged each propeller was driven by a 467-horsepower (348 kW) Electro-Dynamic Company electric motor. They could reach 12.5 knots (23.2 km/h; 14.4 mph) on the surface and 9.3 kn (17.2 km/h; 10.7 mph) underwater. On the surface, the R-1-class had a range of 4,700 nautical miles (8,700 km; 5,400 mi) at 6.2 kn (11.5 km/h; 7.1 mph), or 7,000 nmi (13,000 km; 8,100 mi) if fuel was loaded into their main ballast tanks.

The boats were armed with four 21-inch (533 mm) torpedo tubes in the bow. They carried four reloads, for a total of eight torpedoes. The R-1-class submarines were also armed with a single 3 in (76 mm)/50 caliber deck gun.

== Construction ==
R-1's keel was laid down on 16 October 1917, by the Fore River Shipbuilding Company, in Quincy, Massachusetts. She was launched on 24 August 1918, sponsored by Mrs. Margaret Dashiell, and commissioned on 16 December 1918, at Boston, Massachusetts.

== Service history ==
=== 1918–1931 ===
After her shakedown in New England waters, R-1 was assigned to Submarine Division 9 of the Atlantic Fleet, and based at New London, Connecticut. She got underway on 4 December 1919, for Norfolk, Virginia, and winter exercises with her division in the Gulf of Mexico, and returned to New London, on 18 May 1920, for four months of summer operations with R-2 and R-3, before sailing on 13 September, for Norfolk and overhaul.

When the US Navy adopted its hull classification system on 17 July 1920, she received the hull number SS-78.

R-1 was ordered to the Pacific Ocean, on 11 April 1921. She transited the Panama Canal, in late May, and arrived on 30 June, at her new base, San Pedro, California. She took part in fleet exercises off Central America, from 5 February through 6 April 1923, and returned to San Pedro, on 10 April. On 16 July, she was transferred, along with Division 9, to Pearl Harbor. For the next eight years she trained crews and developed submarine tactics out of Pearl Harbor.

Departing San Diego, California, on 5 January 1931, R-1 sailed for Philadelphia, Pennsylvania, via the Panama Canal, and arrived on 9 February. She was decommissioned there on 1 May.

=== 1940–1946 ===
On 23 September 1940, R-1 was recommissioned, in ordinary, at Groton, Connecticut. She was overhauled and commissioned in full, on 16 October. R-1 got underway with Submarine Squadron 3, Division 42, on 10 December, for the Panama Canal Zone. She was stationed at Coco Solo, for a year, then she was reassigned to Division 31, in June 1941. R-1 was ordered to New London, in October, for a refit, and transferred to Squadron 7.

At New London, on 7 December 1941, R-1 remained in the southern New England area for the first days of the United States participation in World War II. On 9 and 10 December, she patrolled the sealanes leading to New England, and on 11 December, arrived at Bermuda, whence, with other SubRon 7 boats, she joined the hunt for U-boats preying on maritime traffic along the Atlantic Seaboard. Although limited in cruising range, the R-boats operating out of Ordnance Island, Bermuda, continued their patrols through the Kriegsmarine submarine offensive of early 1942.

In February, the submarines established a patrol line between Bermuda and Nantucket Island. On that patrol line, some 300 nautical miles (560 km; 350 mi) northeast of Bermuda, R-1 sighted and fired four torpedoes at the surfaced U-boat, U-582, and was credited with sinking the German submarine, although U-582 was in fact undamaged.

R-1 continued patrols out of Bermuda, until returning to New London, on 20 July, for upkeep and coastal patrols. At the end of September, she resumed operations out of Bermuda. Through November 1944, she rotated between Bermuda and New London, and at the latter, in December, underwent an extensive conversion to enable her to participate in the development of anti-submarine warfare (ASW) equipment and tactics. Emerging from the yard on 26 February 1945, she steamed to New York City, on 28 February; then headed south to Florida, for three weeks of operations off Port Everglades, Florida. In April, she returned to New London, then on to Casco Bay, Maine, for further ASW tests. Returning to the Thames River base, on 29 June, she headed south again on 7 July, and at mid-month, reported for duty with the Fleet Sonar School at Key West, Florida, where she served for the remainder of her career.

== Fate ==
R-1 decommissioned at Key West, on 20 September 1945, and was struck from the Naval Vessel Register on 10 November. Still at Key West, awaiting disposal, on 21 February 1946, the overage submarine sank in 21 ft (6.4 m) of water. Raised three days later, she was sold for scrap on 13 March 1946, to Macey O. Smith, of Miami, Florida.

== See also ==
- Bride 13 (1920)

== Bibliography ==
- "Table 21 - Ships on Navy List June 30, 1919". Congressional Serial Set. U.S. Government Printing Office: 770. 1921.
- Friedman, Norman (1995). U.S. Submarines Through 1945: An Illustrated Design History. Annapolis, Maryland: Naval Institute Press. ISBN 1-55750-263-3.
- Mohl, Michael. "R-1 (SS-78)". Navsource.net.
- Gardiner, Robert & Gray, Randal (1985). Conway's All the World's Fighting Ships 1906–1921. Annapolis, Maryland: Naval Institute Press. ISBN 0-85177-245-5.
- Hall, Anne Martin (1925). Ships of the United States navy and their sponsors, 1913-1923.
- "R-1". Dictionary of American Naval Fighting Ships. Navy Department, Naval History and Heritage Command. This article incorporates text from this source, which is in the public domain.
- Blair, Clay (2000). Hitler's U-Boat War: The Hunters 1939–1942. London: Cassell & Co. ISBN 0-304-35260-8.
