= USS R-8 =

R-class submarine of the United States

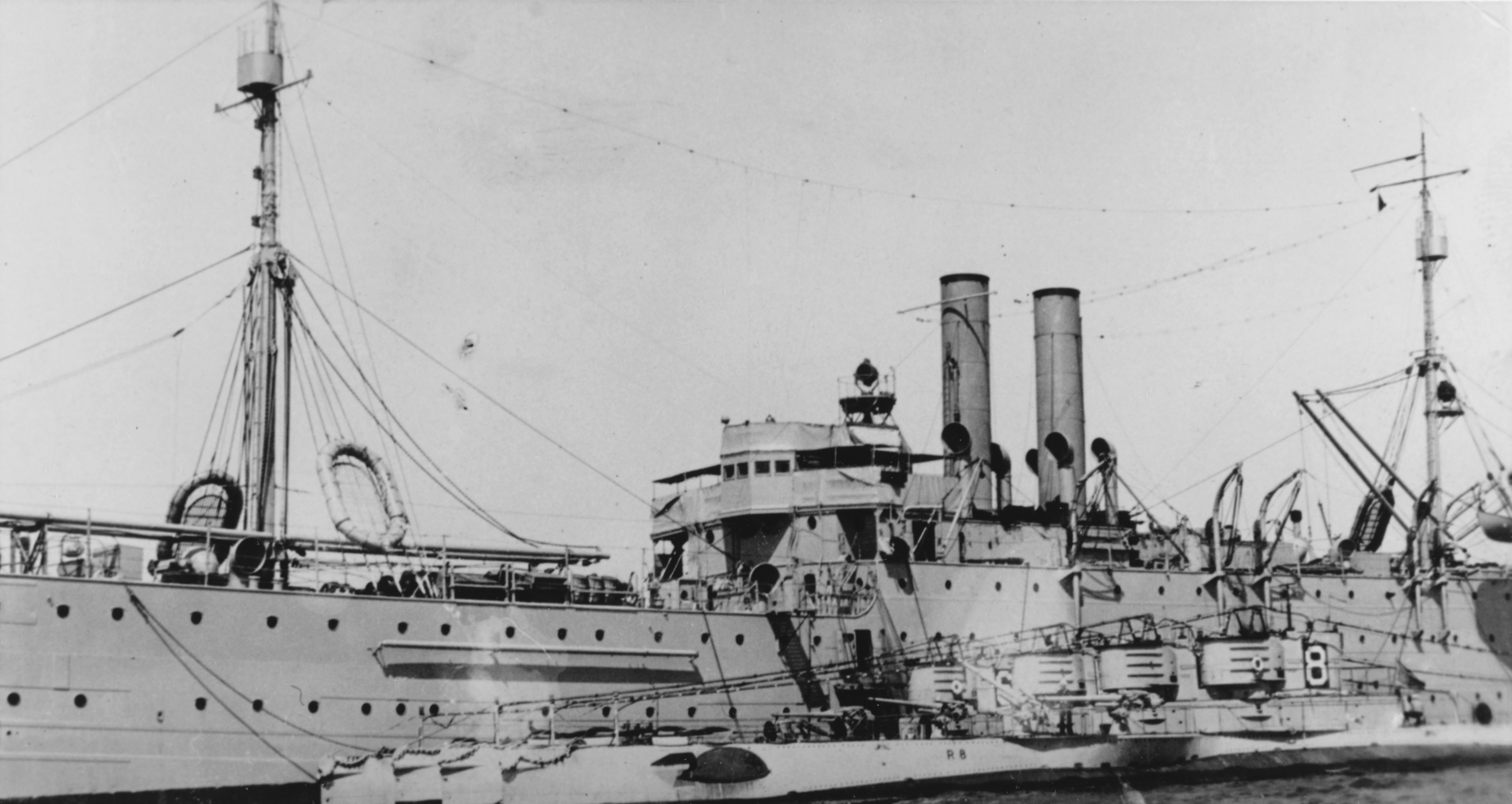
- USS R-8 with three others of her class alongside the submarine tender Camden, in San Diego Harbor, in the early 1920s, R-6, is the inboard boat

History

United States
- Name: R-8
- Ordered: 29 August 1916
- Builder: Fore River Shipbuilding Company, Quincy, Massachusetts
- Cost: $681,408.74 (hull and machinery)
- Laid down: 4 March 1918
- Launched: 17 April 1919
- Sponsored by: Miss Penelope Potter
- Commissioned: 21 July 1919
- Decommissioned: 2 May 1931
- Stricken: 12 May 1936
- Identification: Hull symbol: SS-85 (17 July 1920); Call sign: NILM
- Fate: Sank at moorings, 26 February 1936; Raised, sunk as a target, 19 August 1936

General characteristics
- Class & type: R-1-class submarine
- Displacement: 574 long tons (583 t) surfaced; 685 long tons (696 t) submerged
- Length: 186 feet 3 inches (56.77 m)
- Beam: 18 ft (5.5 m)
- Draft: 15 ft 6 in (4.72 m)
- Installed power: 880 brake horsepower (656 kW) diesel; 934 hp (696 kW) electric
- Propulsion: 2 × NELSECO 6-EB-14 diesel engines; 2 × Electro-Dynamic Company electric motors; 2 × 60-cell batteries; 2 × Propellers
- Speed: 12.5 knots (23.2 km/h; 14.4 mph) surfaced; 9.3 kn (17.2 km/h; 10.7 mph) submerged
- Range: 4,700 nautical miles (8,700 km; 5,400 mi) at 6.2 kn (11.5 km/h; 7.1 mph), 7,000 nmi (13,000 km; 8,100 mi) if fuel loaded into the main ballast tanks
- Test depth: 200 ft (61 m)
- Capacity: 18,880 US gallons (71,500 L; 15,720 imp gal) fuel
- Complement: 2 officers; 27 enlisted
- Armament: 4 × 21-inch (533 mm) torpedo tubes (8 torpedoes); 1 × 3-inch (76 mm)/50-caliber deck gun

USS R-8 (SS-85), also known as "Submarine No. 85", was an R-1-class coastal and harbor defense submarines of the United States Navy commissioned after the end of World War I.

Due to space constraints, the boats built at the Fore River Shipbuilding Company yard, were laid down much later than the boats built at the Union Iron Works and the Lake Torpedo Boat Company yards. Because of this, none were commissioned before the end of WWI.

== Design ==
The R-boats built by the Fore River Shipbuilding Company, R-1 through R-14, and the Union Iron Works, R-15 through R-20, are sometimes considered a separate class, R-1-class, from those built by the Lake Torpedo Boat Company, R-21 through R-27, R-21-class.

The submarines had a length of 186 feet 3 inches (56.8 m) overall, a beam of 18 ft (5.5 m), and a mean draft of 15 ft 6 in (4.7 m). They displaced 574 long tons (583 t) on the surface and 685 long tons (696 t) submerged. The R-1-class submarines had a crew of 2 officers and 27 enlisted men. They had a diving depth of 200 ft (61.0 m).

For surface running, the boats were powered by two 440-brake-horsepower (328 kW) NELSECO 6-EB-14 diesel engines, each driving one propeller shaft. When submerged each propeller was driven by a 467-horsepower (348 kW) Electro-Dynamic Company electric motor. They could reach 12.5 knots (23.2 km/h; 14.4 mph) on the surface and 9.3 kn (17.2 km/h; 10.7 mph) underwater. On the surface, the R-1-class had a range of 4,700 nautical miles (8,700 km; 5,400 mi) at 6.2 kn (11.5 km/h; 7.1 mph), or 7,000 nmi (13,000 km; 8,100 mi) if fuel was loaded into their main ballast tanks.

The boats were armed with four 21-inch (533 mm) torpedo tubes in the bow. They carried four reloads, for a total of eight torpedoes. The R-1-class submarines were also armed with a single 3 in (76 mm)/50 caliber deck gun.

== Construction ==
R-8's keel was laid down on 4 March 1918, by the Fore River Shipbuilding Company, Quincy, Massachusetts. She was launched on 17 April 1919, sponsored by Miss Penelope Potter, and commissioned on 21 July 1919.

== Service history ==
=== 1919–1929 ===
R-8 fitted out at Boston, Massachusetts, during the fall of 1919, proceeded to New London, Connecticut, on 5 December, joined other boats of Submarine Division 9 (SubDiv 9), and continued south for winter exercises in the Gulf of Mexico. She operated out of Pensacola, Florida, until returning to New England, in April.

When the US Navy adopted its hull classification system on 17 July 1920, she received the hull number SS-84.

She departed Newport, Rhode Island, on 13 September 1920, and two days later arrived at the Norfolk Navy Yard, for overhaul prior to transfer to the Pacific Fleet. Sea trials, in early April 1921, followed, and on 21 April, she headed south. Transiting the Panama Canal, in May, she arrived at San Pedro, California, her new homeport, on 30 June, and for the next two years conducted exercises, individual, divisional, and fleet, off the coasts of California and Mexico.

On 16 July 1923, R-8 sailed west for Pearl Harbor, her base for almost eight years, during which she engaged in training and operations with fleet units. In late October 1925, she collided with the minesweeper Widgeon, suffering the loss of her periscopes, the destruction of her bridge, and damage to her radio antenna supports. In August 1927, she searched for missing Dole Air Race aviators.

=== 1930–1936 ===
Ordered back to the East Coast, for inactivation in 1930, R-8 departed Pearl Harbor, on 12 December, transited the Panama Canal, in mid-January 1931, and arrived at the Philadelphia Navy Yard, on 9 February 1931. Decommissioned on 2 May 1931, she was berthed at Philadelphia, as a unit of the Reserve Fleet, until 1936.

== Fate ==
On 26 February 1936, while still in a state of preservation, she sank. Later raised, she was struck from the Naval Vessel Register on 12 May 1936, and on 19 August 1936, she was used as a target vessel for an aerial bombing test. Four near-misses with 100 lb (45 kg) bombs sank her 71 nautical miles (131 km; 82 mi) off Cape Henry, Virginia.

== Wreck ==
Her wreck was initially not found.

Our research effort began to bear fruit after several iterations of requests to the National Archives. Station logs for the Philadelphia Navy Yard identified the [sic] USS Cormorant (AM-40) as the vessel that towed the 1936 Sub out to be scuttled. CORMORANT's log provided the sinking location as being far offshore from the VA-NC border in ~4,300 ft (1,300 m) of water: nearly 70 nmi (130 km; 81 mi) south of where it was previously thought to be.

— Eastern Search and Survey

However, in December 2020, the remains of R-8 were discovered off the coast of Ocean City, Maryland.

== Bibliography ==
- "Table 21 - Ships on Navy List June 30, 1919". Congressional Serial Set. U.S. Government Printing Office: 770. 1921.
- Friedman, Norman (1995). U.S. Submarines Through 1945: An Illustrated Design History. Annapolis, Maryland: Naval Institute Press. ISBN 1-55750-263-3.
- Priolo, Gary. "R-8 (SS-85)". Navsource.net.
- Gardiner, Robert & Gray, Randal (1985). Conway's All the World's Fighting Ships 1906–1921. Annapolis, Maryland: Naval Institute Press. ISBN 0-85177-245-5.
- "R-8". Dictionary of American Naval Fighting Ships. Navy Department, Naval History and Heritage Command. This article incorporates text from this source, which is in the public domain.
- Hall, Anne Martin (1925). Ships of the United States navy and their sponsors, 1913-1923.
- Hedman, Ric; Johnston, David (16 March 2025). "R-8".
- Miller, Hallie (10 December 2020). "American submarine discovered off Ocean City coast". Baltimore Sun.
