= USS R-7 =

R-class submarine of the United States

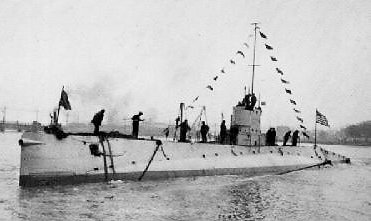
- USS R-7, probably just after she was launched on 5 April 1919

History

United States
- Name: R-7
- Ordered: 29 August 1916
- Builder: Fore River Shipbuilding Company, Quincy, Massachusetts
- Cost: $647,065.69 (hull and machinery)
- Laid down: 6 December 1917
- Launched: 5 April 1919
- Sponsored by: Miss Katharine Langdon Hill
- Commissioned: 12 June 1919
- Decommissioned: 2 May 1931
- Recommissioned: 22 July 1940
- Decommissioned: 14 September 1945
- Stricken: 11 October 1945
- Identification: Hull symbol: SS-84 (17 July 1920); Call sign: NILL
- Fate: Sold for scrap, September 1946

General characteristics
- Class & type: R-1-class submarine
- Displacement: 574 long tons (583 t) surfaced; 685 long tons (696 t) submerged
- Length: 186 feet 3 inches (56.77 m)
- Beam: 18 ft (5.5 m)
- Draft: 15 ft 6 in (4.72 m)
- Installed power: 880 brake horsepower (656 kW) diesel; 934 hp (696 kW) electric
- Propulsion: 2 × NELSECO 6-EB-14 diesel engines; 2 × Electro-Dynamic Company electric motors; 2 × 60-cell batteries; 2 × Propellers
- Speed: 12.5 knots (23.2 km/h; 14.4 mph) surfaced; 9.3 kn (17.2 km/h; 10.7 mph) submerged
- Range: 4,700 nautical miles (8,700 km; 5,400 mi) at 6.2 kn (11.5 km/h; 7.1 mph), 7,000 nmi (13,000 km; 8,100 mi) if fuel loaded into the main ballast tanks
- Test depth: 200 ft (61 m)
- Capacity: 18,880 US gallons (71,500 L; 15,720 imp gal) fuel
- Complement: 2 officers; 27 enlisted
- Armament: 4 × 21-inch (533 mm) torpedo tubes (8 torpedoes); 1 × 3-inch (76 mm)/50-caliber deck gun

USS R-7 (SS-84), also known as "Submarine No. 84", was an R-1-class coastal and harbor defense submarines of the United States Navy commissioned after the end of World War I.

Due to space constraints, the boats built at the Fore River Shipbuilding Company yard, were laid down much later than the boats built at the Union Iron Works and the Lake Torpedo Boat Company yards. Because of this, none were commissioned before the end of WWI.

== Design ==
The R-boats built by the Fore River Shipbuilding Company, R-1 through R-14, and the Union Iron Works, R-15 through R-20, are sometimes considered a separate class, R-1-class, from those built by the Lake Torpedo Boat Company, R-21 through R-27, R-21-class.

The submarines had a length of 186 feet 3 inches (56.8 m) overall, a beam of 18 ft (5.5 m), and a mean draft of 15 ft 6 in (4.7 m). They displaced 574 long tons (583 t) on the surface and 685 long tons (696 t) submerged. The R-1-class submarines had a crew of 2 officers and 27 enlisted men. They had a diving depth of 200 ft (61.0 m).

For surface running, the boats were powered by two 440-brake-horsepower (328 kW) NELSECO 6-EB-14 diesel engines, each driving one propeller shaft. When submerged each propeller was driven by a 467-horsepower (348 kW) Electro-Dynamic Company electric motor. They could reach 12.5 knots (23.2 km/h; 14.4 mph) on the surface and 9.3 kn (17.2 km/h; 10.7 mph) underwater. On the surface, the R-1-class had a range of 4,700 nautical miles (8,700 km; 5,400 mi) at 6.2 kn (11.5 km/h; 7.1 mph), or 7,000 nmi (13,000 km; 8,100 mi) if fuel was loaded into their main ballast tanks.

The boats were armed with four 21-inch (533 mm) torpedo tubes in the bow. They carried four reloads, for a total of eight torpedoes. The R-1-class submarines were also armed with a single 3 in (76 mm)/50 caliber deck gun.

== Construction ==
R-7's keel was laid down on 6 December 1917, by the Fore River Shipbuilding Company, in Quincy, Massachusetts. She was launched on 5 April 1919, sponsored by Mrs. Florence Bass, and commissioned on 12 June 1919.

== Service history ==
=== 1919–1931 ===
Completed and fitted out at the Boston Navy Yard, during the summer and early fall of 1919, R-7 got underway for New London, Connecticut, and duty with SubDiv 9 on 21 October. Through November, she conducted training exercises off the Connecticut coast. In December, she headed south for Norfolk, Virginia, and winter exercises in the Gulf of Mexico. Into April 1920, she operated out of Pensacola, Florida, before returning to New England, in May.

When the US Navy adopted its hull classification system on 17 July 1920, she received the hull number SS-84.

On 13 September 1920, she again headed south, this time for overhaul at the Norfolk Navy Yard, until April 1921. Then, reassigned to the Pacific Fleet, she continued south and transited the Panama Canal.

Arriving at San Pedro, California, her new homeport, on 30 June, she engaged in individual, divisional, and fleet exercises, off the coasts of California and Mexico, for the next two years. On 11 July 1923, she departed California, and 11 days later arrived at Pearl Harbor, her base for the next eight years. R-7's operations included fleet problems and regular patrols which, with increased air traffic from 1925 on, occasionally involved air-sea rescue operations.

Toward the end of 1930, R-7 was ordered back to the East Coast for inactivation. Underway on 12 December, she arrived at the Philadelphia Navy Yard, on 9 February 1931, and decommissioned on 2 May.

=== 1940–1946 ===
She remained in the Reserve Fleet until recommissioned in ordinary, 22 July 1940. R-7 shifted to New London, and completed activation and recommissioned in full, on 14 March 1941. Ready for sea in early April, she moved south in May, and conducted patrols in the Virgin Islands and off Panama, into the fall. On 8 October, she returned to New London, underwent overhaul, and at the end of November, began a series of anti-submarine patrols in the shipping lanes between Bermuda and the northeastern coast. She maintained those patrols through the German anti-shipping offensive of 1942, alternately basing her operations at Bermuda and New London. Once, in May 1942, she sighted a U-boat and launched four torpedoes, but lost contact while reloading.

From the spring of 1943, until the end of World War II, R-7 shifted the emphasis of her anti-submarine warfare mission and concentrated on training destroyers and destroyer escorts in ASW tactics.

== Fate ==
She arrived at Portsmouth, New Hampshire, on 6 September 1945, decommissioned on 14 September, and was struck from the Naval Vessel Register on 11 October 1945. In September 1946 she was sold for scrap to John J. Duane, of Quincy, Massachusetts.

== Bibliography ==
- "Table 21 - Ships on Navy List June 30, 1919". Congressional Serial Set. U.S. Government Printing Office: 770. 1921.
- Friedman, Norman (1995). U.S. Submarines Through 1945: An Illustrated Design History. Annapolis, Maryland: Naval Institute Press. ISBN 1-55750-263-3.
- Mohl, Michael. "R-7 (SS-84)". Navsource.net.
- Gardiner, Robert & Gray, Randal (1985). Conway's All the World's Fighting Ships 1906–1921. Annapolis, Maryland: Naval Institute Press. ISBN 0-85177-245-5.
- "R-7". Dictionary of American Naval Fighting Ships. Navy Department, Naval History and Heritage Command. This article incorporates text from this source, which is in the public domain.
- Hall, Anne Martin (1925). Ships of the United States navy and their sponsors, 1913-1923.
