= USS R-9 =

R-class submarine of the United States

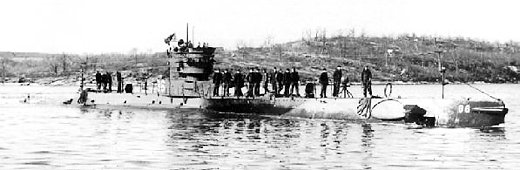
- USS R-9 (SS-86), possibly c. early 1940s

History

United States
- Name: R-9
- Ordered: 29 August 1916
- Builder: Fore River Shipbuilding Company, Quincy, Massachusetts
- Cost: $680,028.66 (hull and machinery)
- Laid down: 6 March 1918
- Launched: 24 May 1919
- Sponsored by: Mrs. Mary Stowe
- Commissioned: 30 July 1919
- Decommissioned: 2 May 1931
- Recommissioned: 14 March 1941
- Decommissioned: 25 September 1945
- Stricken: 11 October 1945
- Identification: Hull symbol: SS-86 (17 July 1920); Call sign: NILN
- Fate: Sold for scrap, February 1946

General characteristics
- Class & type: R-1-class submarine
- Displacement: 574 long tons (583 t) surfaced; 685 long tons (696 t) submerged
- Length: 186 feet 3 inches (56.77 m)
- Beam: 18 ft (5.5 m)
- Draft: 15 ft 6 in (4.72 m)
- Installed power: 880 brake horsepower (656 kW) diesel; 934 hp (696 kW) electric
- Propulsion: 2 × NELSECO 6-EB-14 diesel engines; 2 × Electro-Dynamic Company electric motors; 2 × 60-cell batteries; 2 × Propellers
- Speed: 12.5 knots (23.2 km/h; 14.4 mph) surfaced; 9.3 kn (17.2 km/h; 10.7 mph) submerged
- Range: 4,700 nautical miles (8,700 km; 5,400 mi) at 6.2 kn (11.5 km/h; 7.1 mph), 7,000 nmi (13,000 km; 8,100 mi) if fuel loaded into the main ballast tanks
- Test depth: 200 ft (61 m)
- Capacity: 18,880 US gallons (71,500 L; 15,720 imp gal) fuel
- Complement: 2 officers; 27 enlisted
- Armament: 4 × 21-inch (533 mm) torpedo tubes (8 torpedoes); 1 × 3-inch (76 mm)/50-caliber deck gun

USS R-9 (SS-86), also known as "Submarine No. 86", was an R-1-class coastal and harbor defense submarines of the United States Navy commissioned after the end of World War I.

Due to space constraints, the boats built at the Fore River Shipbuilding Company yard, were laid down much later than the boats built at the Union Iron Works and the Lake Torpedo Boat Company yards. Because of this, none were commissioned before the end of WWI.

== Design ==
The R-boats built by the Fore River Shipbuilding Company, R-1 through R-14, and the Union Iron Works, R-15 through R-20, are sometimes considered a separate class, R-1-class, from those built by the Lake Torpedo Boat Company, R-21 through R-27, R-21-class.

The submarines had a length of 186 feet 3 inches (56.8 m) overall, a beam of 18 ft (5.5 m), and a mean draft of 15 ft 6 in (4.7 m). They displaced 574 long tons (583 t) on the surface and 685 long tons (696 t) submerged. The R-1-class submarines had a crew of 2 officers and 27 enlisted men. They had a diving depth of 200 ft (61.0 m).

For surface running, the boats were powered by two 440-brake-horsepower (328 kW) NELSECO 6-EB-14 diesel engines, each driving one propeller shaft. When submerged each propeller was driven by a 467-horsepower (348 kW) Electro-Dynamic Company electric motor. They could reach 12.5 knots (23.2 km/h; 14.4 mph) on the surface and 9.3 kn (17.2 km/h; 10.7 mph) underwater. On the surface, the R-1-class had a range of 4,700 nautical miles (8,700 km; 5,400 mi) at 6.2 kn (11.5 km/h; 7.1 mph), or 7,000 nmi (13,000 km; 8,100 mi) if fuel was loaded into their main ballast tanks.

The boats were armed with four 21-inch (533 mm) torpedo tubes in the bow. They carried four reloads, for a total of eight torpedoes. The R-1-class submarines were also armed with a single 3 in (76 mm)/50 caliber deck gun.

== Construction ==
R-9's keel was laid down on 6 March 1918, by the Fore River Shipbuilding Company, Quincy, Massachusetts. She was launched on 24 May 1919, sponsored by Mrs. Mary Stowe, and commissioned on 30 July 1919.

== Service history ==
=== 1919–1931 ===
Following fitting out and shakedown, R-9, operated along the northeast coast primarily in the New London, Connecticut—Newport, Rhode Island.

When the US Navy adopted its hull classification system on 17 July 1920, she received the hull number SS-86.

Ordered to the Pacific, in March 1924, she arrived at Pearl Harbor, her new homeport, on 4 May. Operations and exercises, from individual to fleet in scope, occupied the next six and a half years, and on 12 December 1930, she got underway for return to the Atlantic. Retransiting the Panama Canal in mid-January 1931, she arrived at the Philadelphia Navy Yard, on 9 February, and reported for inactivation. Decommissioned on 2 May 1931, R-9 remained at Philadelphia, berthed with the Reserve Fleet.

=== 1940–1946 ===
In September 1940, R-9 was placed in reduced commission, then moved up the coast to New London, where she completed activation and was placed in full commission, on 14 March 1941.

Within two months R-9 was en route to the Caribbean Sea, and duty under Commander, Panama Sea Frontier. Arriving at Coco Solo, on 27 May, she patrolled the approaches to the vital inter-ocean canal with SubRon 3, into October, then returned north to New London, for overhaul, arriving on 23 May. During December, she was attached to the Submarine School, but with the new year, 1942, the submarine proceeded to Casco Bay, Maine, for operational training. From mid-month on, through the U-boat offensive of 1942 and early 1943, she rotated between New London and Bermuda, to patrol the shipping lanes which transited the Eastern Sea Frontier and the Bermuda Patrol Areas. She shifted to anti-submarine warfare (ASW) training programs, in the spring of 1943, and operated primarily in the New London area for most of the remainder of World War II. In late March 1945 she moved south again, trained with destroyers, destroyer escorts, and escort carriers, off Cuba, and southern Florida. Then, in mid-May, she returned to New London.

== Fate ==
On 20 September 1945, R-9 proceeded to Portsmouth, New Hampshire, where she decommissioned on 25 September 1945. Struck from the Naval Vessel Register on 11 October 1945, she was scrapped in February 1946.

== Bibliography ==
- "Table 21 - Ships on Navy List June 30, 1919". Congressional Serial Set. U.S. Government Printing Office: 770. 1921.
- Friedman, Norman (1995). U.S. Submarines Through 1945: An Illustrated Design History. Annapolis, Maryland: Naval Institute Press. ISBN 1-55750-263-3.
- Priolo, Gary. "R-9 (SS-86)". Navsource.net.
- Gardiner, Robert & Gray, Randal (1985). Conway's All the World's Fighting Ships 1906–1921. Annapolis, Maryland: Naval Institute Press. ISBN 0-85177-245-5.
- "R-9". Dictionary of American Naval Fighting Ships. Navy Department, Naval History and Heritage Command. This article incorporates text from this source, which is in the public domain.
- Hall, Anne Martin (1925). Ships of the United States navy and their sponsors, 1913-1923.
