= USS R-17 =

R-class submarine of the United States

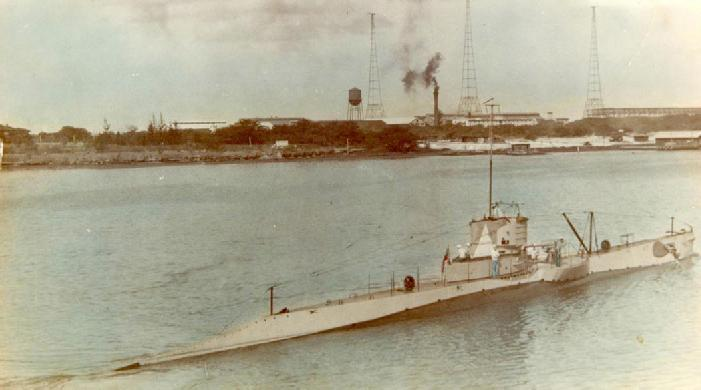
- USS R-17 (SS-94) underway in a tinted colored photo, c. 1923, note the large white triangle painted on the submarine's fairwater for recognition

History

United States
- Name: R-17
- Ordered: 29 August 1916
- Builder: Union Iron Works, San Francisco, California
- Cost: $802,128.53 (hull and machinery)
- Laid down: 5 May 1917
- Launched: 24 December 1917
- Sponsored by: Miss Bertha Frances Dew
- Commissioned: 18 August 1918
- Decommissioned: 15 May 1931
- Recommissioned: 25 March 1941
- Decommissioned: 9 March 1942
- Stricken: 22 June 1945
- Identification: Hull symbol: SS-93 (17 July 1920); Call sign: NAFX
- Fate: Transferred to United Kingdom, 9 March 1942

United Kingdom
- Name: P.512
- Acquired: 9 March 1942
- Fate: Returned to US Navy, 6 September 1944; Sold for scrapping, 16 November 1945
- Notes: Crewed by the Royal Canadian Navy

General characteristics
- Class & type: R-1-class submarine
- Displacement: 574 long tons (583 t) surfaced; 685 long tons (696 t) submerged
- Length: 186 feet 3 inches (56.77 m)
- Beam: 18 ft (5.5 m)
- Draft: 15 ft 6 in (4.72 m)
- Installed power: 880 brake horsepower (656 kW) diesel; 934 hp (696 kW) electric
- Propulsion: 2 × NELSECO 6-EB-14 diesel engines; 2 × Electro-Dynamic Company electric motors; 2 × 60-cell batteries; 2 × Propellers
- Speed: 12.5 knots (23.2 km/h; 14.4 mph) surfaced; 9.3 kn (17.2 km/h; 10.7 mph) submerged
- Range: 4,700 nautical miles (8,700 km; 5,400 mi) at 6.2 kn (11.5 km/h; 7.1 mph), 7,000 nmi (13,000 km; 8,100 mi) if fuel loaded into the main ballast tanks
- Test depth: 200 ft (61 m)
- Capacity: 18,880 US gallons (71,500 L; 15,720 imp gal) fuel
- Complement: 2 officers; 27 enlisted
- Armament: 4 × 21-inch (533 mm) torpedo tubes (8 torpedoes); 1 × 3-inch (76 mm)/50-caliber deck gun

USS R-17 (SS-94), also known as "Submarine No. 94", was an R-1-class coastal and harbor defense submarines of the United States Navy commissioned before the end of World War I.

== Design ==
The R-boats built by the Fore River Shipbuilding Company, R-1 through R-14, and the Union Iron Works, R-15 through R-20, are sometimes considered a separate class, R-1-class, from those built by the Lake Torpedo Boat Company, R-21 through R-27, R-21-class.

The submarines had a length of 186 feet 3 inches (56.8 m) overall, a beam of 18 ft (5.5 m), and a mean draft of 15 ft 6 in (4.7 m). They displaced 574 long tons (583 t) on the surface and 685 long tons (696 t) submerged. The R-1-class submarines had a crew of 2 officers and 27 enlisted men. They had a diving depth of 200 ft (61.0 m).

For surface running, the boats were powered by two 440-brake-horsepower (328 kW) NELSECO 6-EB-14 diesel engines, each driving one propeller shaft. When submerged each propeller was driven by a 467-horsepower (348 kW) Electro-Dynamic Company electric motor. They could reach 12.5 knots (23.2 km/h; 14.4 mph) on the surface and 9.3 kn (17.2 km/h; 10.7 mph) underwater. On the surface, the R-1-class had a range of 4,700 nautical miles (8,700 km; 5,400 mi) at 6.2 kn (11.5 km/h; 7.1 mph), or 7,000 nmi (13,000 km; 8,100 mi) if fuel was loaded into their main ballast tanks.

The boats were armed with four 21-inch (533 mm) torpedo tubes in the bow. They carried four reloads, for a total of eight torpedoes. The R-1-class submarines were also armed with a single 3 in (76 mm)/50 caliber deck gun.

== Construction ==
R-17's keel was laid down by the Union Iron Works, in San Francisco, California, on 5 May 1917. She was launched on 24 December 1917, sponsored by Miss Bertha Frances Dew, and commissioned on 17 August 1918.

== Service history ==
=== 1918–1931 ===
Commissioned toward the end of World War I, R-17 operated briefly off the California coast, then patrolled off the Panama Canal Zone, returning to California, in December 1918. In March 1919, she arrived at San Francisco, for overhaul, after which she moved west to Pearl Harbor. Departing the West Coast, on 17 June, she arrived in the Territory of Hawaii, on 25 June, and for the next 11 years operated with fleet units and tested equipment being developed for submarines.

When the US Navy adopted its hull classification system on 17 July 1920, she received the hull number SS-94.

R-17 departed Pearl Harbor, on 12 December 1930, called at San Diego, thence continued on to the East Coast for inactivation. Arriving at the Philadelphia Navy Yard, on 9 February 1931, she was decommissioned 15 May, and berthed at League Island, until after the outbreak of World War II in Europe.

=== 1941–1946 ===
Recommissioned at New London, 25 March 1941, R-17 headed south, on 14 May, and patrolled in the Virgin Islands, during June. She then patrolled off the Panama Canal Zone, in July, August, and September; then in October, returned to New London. For the next four months she conducted training exercises.

On 9 March 1942, she was decommissioned and transferred to the United Kingdom under the Lend-Lease Agreement. Commissioned in the Royal Navy as HMS P.512, she was employed at Bermuda, as a training ship for the Royal Canadian Navy, until 6 September 1944, when she was returned to the US Navy, at Philadelphia.

== Fate ==
Retained for use as a target ship, until after the end of the war in Europe, R-17 was struck from the Naval Vessel Register on 22 June 1945. She was sold, on 16 November 1945, to the North American Smelting Company, in Philadelphia, for scrapping.

== Awards ==
- World War I Victory Medal
- American Defense Service Medal
- World War II Victory Medal

== Bibliography ==
- "Table 21 - Ships on Navy List June 30, 1919". Congressional Serial Set. U.S. Government Printing Office: 770. 1921.
- Friedman, Norman (1995). U.S. Submarines Through 1945: An Illustrated Design History. Annapolis, Maryland: Naval Institute Press. ISBN 1-55750-263-3.
- Priolo, Gary. "R-17 (SS-94)". Navsource.net.
- Gardiner, Robert & Gray, Randal (1985). Conway's All the World's Fighting Ships 1906–1921. Annapolis, Maryland: Naval Institute Press. ISBN 0-85177-245-5.
- "R-17". Dictionary of American Naval Fighting Ships. Navy Department, Naval History and Heritage Command. 26 August 2015. This article incorporates text from this source, which is in the public domain.
- Hall, Anne Martin (1925). Ships of the United States navy and their sponsors, 1913-1923.
