= USS R-3 =

R-class submarine of the United States

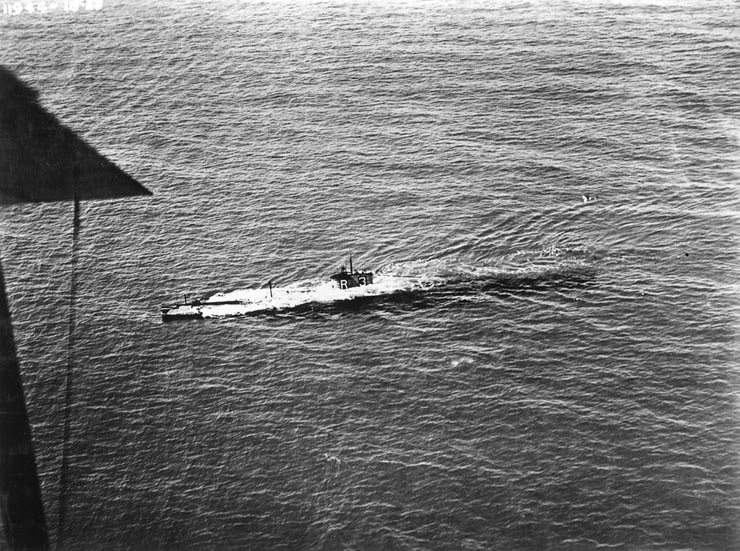
- USS R-3 (SS-80) underway, 18 October 1923, at Pearl Harbor

History

United States
- Name: R-3
- Ordered: 29 August 1916
- Builder: Fore River Shipbuilding Company, Quincy, Massachusetts
- Cost: $696,775.39 (hull and machinery)
- Laid down: 11 December 1917
- Launched: 18 January 1919
- Sponsored by: Mrs. Florence McCord
- Commissioned: 17 April 1919
- Decommissioned: 10 August 1934
- Recommissioned: 19 August 1940
- Decommissioned: 4 November 1941
- Stricken: 7 November 1941
- Identification: Hull symbol: SS-80 (17 July 1920); Call sign: NILF
- Fate: Transferred to United Kingdom, 4 November 1941

United Kingdom
- Name: P.511
- Acquired: 4 November 1941
- Fate: Returned to US Navy, 20 December 1944; Scrapped, 1948

General characteristics
- Class & type: R-1-class submarine
- Displacement: 574 long tons (583 t) surfaced; 685 long tons (696 t) submerged
- Length: 186 feet 3 inches (56.77 m)
- Beam: 18 ft (5.5 m)
- Draft: 15 ft 6 in (4.72 m)
- Installed power: 880 brake horsepower (656 kW) diesel; 934 hp (696 kW) electric
- Propulsion: 2 × NELSECO 6-EB-14 diesel engines; 2 × Electro-Dynamic Company electric motors; 2 × 60-cell batteries; 2 × Propellers
- Speed: 12.5 knots (23.2 km/h; 14.4 mph) surfaced; 9.3 kn (17.2 km/h; 10.7 mph) submerged
- Range: 4,700 nautical miles (8,700 km; 5,400 mi) at 6.2 kn (11.5 km/h; 7.1 mph), 7,000 nmi (13,000 km; 8,100 mi) if fuel loaded into the main ballast tanks
- Test depth: 200 ft (61 m)
- Capacity: 18,880 US gallons (71,500 L; 15,720 imp gal) fuel
- Complement: 2 officers; 27 enlisted
- Armament: 4 × 21-inch (533 mm) torpedo tubes (8 torpedoes); 1 × 3-inch (76 mm)/50-caliber deck gun

USS R-3 (SS-80), also known as "Submarine No. 80", was an R-1-class coastal and harbor defense submarines of the United States Navy commissioned after the end of World War I.

Due to space constraints, the boats built at the Fore River Shipbuilding Company yard, were laid down much later than the boats built at the Union Iron Works and the Lake Torpedo Boat Company yards. Because of this, none were commissioned before the end of WWI.

== Design ==
The R-boats built by the Fore River Shipbuilding Company, R-1 through R-14, and the Union Iron Works, R-15 through R-20, are sometimes considered a separate class, R-1-class, from those built by the Lake Torpedo Boat Company, R-21 through R-27, R-21-class.

The submarines had a length of 186 feet 3 inches (56.8 m) overall, a beam of 18 ft (5.5 m), and a mean draft of 15 ft 6 in (4.7 m). They displaced 574 long tons (583 t) on the surface and 685 long tons (696 t) submerged. The R-1-class submarines had a crew of 2 officers and 27 enlisted men. They had a diving depth of 200 ft (61.0 m).

For surface running, the boats were powered by two 440-brake-horsepower (328 kW) NELSECO 6-EB-14 diesel engines, each driving one propeller shaft. When submerged each propeller was driven by a 467-horsepower (348 kW) Electro-Dynamic Company electric motor. They could reach 12.5 knots (23.2 km/h; 14.4 mph) on the surface and 9.3 kn (17.2 km/h; 10.7 mph) underwater. On the surface, the R-1-class had a range of 4,700 nautical miles (8,700 km; 5,400 mi) at 6.2 kn (11.5 km/h; 7.1 mph), or 7,000 nmi (13,000 km; 8,100 mi) if fuel was loaded into their main ballast tanks.

The boats were armed with four 21-inch (533 mm) torpedo tubes in the bow. They carried four reloads, for a total of eight torpedoes. The R-1-class submarines were also armed with a single 3 in (76 mm)/50 caliber deck gun.

== Construction ==
R-3's keel was laid down on 11 December 1917, by the Fore River Shipbuilding Company, in Quincy, Massachusetts. She was launched on 18 January 1919, sponsored by Mrs. Florence McCord, and commissioned on 17 April 1919, at Boston, Massachusetts.

== Service history ==
=== 1919–1934 ===
After shakedown off the Massachusetts coast, R-3 was assigned to Submarine Division 9 at New London, Connecticut. She departed New London, with the coaling ship Camden, on 4 December 1919, for Norfolk, Virginia, and a winter deployment with the division in the Gulf of Mexico, from 13 January to 27 March 1920. R-3 returned to New London, on 18 May, for four months of summer exercises with her sister boats R-1 and R-2. When the US Navy adopted its hull classification system on 17 July 1920, she received the hull number SS-80. She sailed on 13 September, for Norfolk, and overhaul.

R-3 was transferred to the Pacific Fleet, with Division 9, on 8 April, transited the Panama Canal, on 28 May, and arrived 30 June, at her new base, San Pedro, California. After operating for two years in California waters, she was transferred 16 July 1923, to Pearl Harbor, where she was stationed for the next years, engaging in training and operations with fleet units.

R-3 was reassigned, 12 December 1930, to the Atlantic Fleet for duty with Division 4. She arrived on 9 February 1931, at New London. After acting as a training ship at the Submarine School, in New London, for five months, she was ordered 6 May, to Washington, DC, for air purification tests by the Naval Research Laboratory. In 1932, R-3 conducted sound and radio experiments for the laboratory and trained personnel from the Deep Sea Diving School, off Piney Point, Maryland.

R-3 was placed in reduced commission, 26 April 1933, and after testing low-pressure valves for the Naval Research Laboratory, departed for Annapolis, Maryland, on 2 June 1933, where she served as a training ship for future generations of submariners. She sailed 22 February 1934, for Guantanamo Bay, and sound operations with Eagle 58, followed by training duty at Washington, DC, with the Deep Sea Diving School. R-3 was decommissioned 10 August 1934, at the Philadelphia Navy Yard.

=== 1940–1948 ===
R-3 recommissioned 19 August 1940, at New London, and was attached to Division 42, and after a brief period at New London, 23 October to 10 December, headed for Coco Solo. Patrols and training duties followed, and in mid-1941, she returned to New London, to prepare for transfer to the Royal Navy. Decommissioned and transferred 4 November 1941, R-3 was struck from the Naval Vessel Register on 7 November 1941. She continued her career in British home waters as HMS P.511, a training submarine, until returned to the US Navy, in the United Kingdom, 20 December 1944.

== Fate ==
While enroute to the scrappers, she was beached on 12 November 1947. She later foundered at her moorings on 21 November 1947, at Karnes Bay. She was scrapped at Troon, Scotland, in 1948.

== Award ==
- American Defense Service Medal

== Bibliography ==
- "Table 21 - Ships on Navy List June 30, 1919". Congressional Serial Set. U.S. Government Printing Office: 770. 1921.
- Friedman, Norman (1995). U.S. Submarines Through 1945: An Illustrated Design History. Annapolis, Maryland: Naval Institute Press. ISBN 1-55750-263-3.
- Priolo, Gary. "R-3 (SS-80)". Navsource.net.
- Gardiner, Robert & Gray, Randal (1985). Conway's All the World's Fighting Ships 1906–1921. Annapolis, Maryland: Naval Institute Press. ISBN 0-85177-245-5.
- "R-3". Dictionary of American Naval Fighting Ships. Navy Department, Naval History and Heritage Command. This article incorporates text from this source, which is in the public domain.
- Hall, Anne Martin (1925). Ships of the United States navy and their sponsors, 1913-1923.
