= USS R-13 =

R-class submarine of the United States

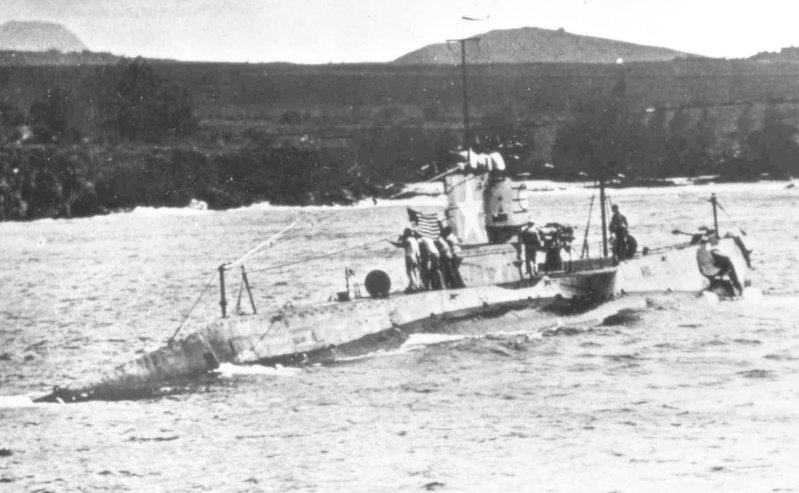
- USS R-13 (SS-90) probably in the Panama Canal area, c. early 1920s, note the large white star recognition symbol on her fairwater

History

United States
- Name: R-13
- Ordered: 29 August 1916
- Builder: Fore River Shipbuilding Company, Quincy, Massachusetts
- Cost: $614,641.53 (hull and machinery)
- Laid down: 27 March 1918
- Launched: 27 August 1919
- Sponsored by: Miss Fannie Bemis Chandler
- Commissioned: 17 October 1919
- Decommissioned: 14 September 1945
- Stricken: 11 October 1945
- Identification: Hull symbol: SS-90 (17 July 1920); Call sign: NILS
- Fate: Sold for scrap, 13 March 1946

General characteristics
- Class & type: R-1-class submarine
- Displacement: 574 long tons (583 t) surfaced; 685 long tons (696 t) submerged
- Length: 186 feet 3 inches (56.77 m)
- Beam: 18 ft (5.5 m)
- Draft: 15 ft 6 in (4.72 m)
- Installed power: 880 brake horsepower (656 kW) diesel; 934 hp (696 kW) electric
- Propulsion: 2 × NELSECO 6-EB-14 diesel engines; 2 × Electro-Dynamic Company electric motors; 2 × 60-cell batteries; 2 × Propellers
- Speed: 12.5 knots (23.2 km/h; 14.4 mph) surfaced; 9.3 kn (17.2 km/h; 10.7 mph) submerged
- Range: 4,700 nautical miles (8,700 km; 5,400 mi) at 6.2 kn (11.5 km/h; 7.1 mph), 7,000 nmi (13,000 km; 8,100 mi) if fuel loaded into the main ballast tanks
- Test depth: 200 ft (61 m)
- Capacity: 18,880 US gallons (71,500 L; 15,720 imp gal) fuel
- Complement: 2 officers; 27 enlisted
- Armament: 4 × 21-inch (533 mm) torpedo tubes (8 torpedoes); 1 × 3-inch (76 mm)/50-caliber deck gun

USS R-13 (SS-90), also known as "Submarine No. 90", was an R-1-class coastal and harbor defense submarines of the United States Navy commissioned after the end of World War I.

Due to space constraints, the boats built at the Fore River Shipbuilding Company yard, were laid down much later than the boats built at the Union Iron Works and the Lake Torpedo Boat Company yards. Because of this, none were commissioned before the end of WWI.

== Design ==
The R-boats built by the Fore River Shipbuilding Company, R-1 through R-14, and the Union Iron Works, R-15 through R-20, are sometimes considered a separate class, R-1-class, from those built by the Lake Torpedo Boat Company, R-21 through R-27, R-21-class.

The submarines had a length of 186 feet 3 inches (56.8 m) overall, a beam of 18 ft (5.5 m), and a mean draft of 15 ft 6 in (4.7 m). They displaced 574 long tons (583 t) on the surface and 685 long tons (696 t) submerged. The R-1-class submarines had a crew of 2 officers and 27 enlisted men. They had a diving depth of 200 ft (61.0 m).

For surface running, the boats were powered by two 440-brake-horsepower (328 kW) NELSECO 6-EB-14 diesel engines, each driving one propeller shaft. When submerged each propeller was driven by a 467-horsepower (348 kW) Electro-Dynamic Company electric motor. They could reach 12.5 knots (23.2 km/h; 14.4 mph) on the surface and 9.3 kn (17.2 km/h; 10.7 mph) underwater. On the surface, the R-1-class had a range of 4,700 nautical miles (8,700 km; 5,400 mi) at 6.2 kn (11.5 km/h; 7.1 mph), or 7,000 nmi (13,000 km; 8,100 mi) if fuel was loaded into their main ballast tanks.

The boats were armed with four 21-inch (533 mm) torpedo tubes in the bow. They carried four reloads, for a total of eight torpedoes. The R-1-class submarines were also armed with a single 3 in (76 mm)/50 caliber deck gun.

== Construction ==
R-13's keel was laid down by the Fore River Shipbuilding Company, in Quincy, Massachusetts, on 27 March 1918. She was launched on 27 August 1919, sponsored by Miss Fanny Bemis Chandler, and commissioned on 17 October 1919.

== Service history ==
=== 1919–1941 ===
Following shakedown in New England waters, R-13 briefly operated out of New London, Connecticut. In the spring of 1920, she conducted training patrols off Bermuda, and then prepared for transfer to the Pacific. She departed the East Coast in mid-June; and transited the Panama Canal, in early July.

When the US Navy adopted its hull classification system on 17 July 1920, she received the hull number SS-90.

R-13 continued up the West Coast to San Pedro, California, whence she headed for the Territory of Hawaii, on 26 August 1920.

R-13 arrived at Pearl Harbor, on 6 September 1920, and for the next nine years, assisted in the development of submarine warfare tactics. Ordered back to the Atlantic, with the new decade, the submarine stood out from Pearl Harbor on 12 December 1930, and on 9 February 1931, arrived back at New London. There, she served as a training ship until 1941.

=== 1941–1946 ===
On 26 May 1941, R-13 headed south to her new homeport, Key West, Florida. Arriving at the end of the month, she returned to New London, in July, but was back in southern Florida, in August. During the fall she conducted operations in the Gulf of Mexico, and then assumed training duties for the Sound School, at Key West. Through World War II, she continued the work there and out of Port Everglades, Florida, and conducted patrols in the Yucatán Channel and the Florida Straits.

== Fate ==
With the cessation of hostilities, R-13 was decommissioned on 14 September 1945, was struck from the Naval Vessel Register on 11 October 1945, and was sold on 13 March 1946.

== Bibliography ==
- "Table 21 - Ships on Navy List June 30, 1919". Congressional Serial Set. U.S. Government Printing Office: 770. 1921.
- Friedman, Norman (1995). U.S. Submarines Through 1945: An Illustrated Design History. Annapolis, Maryland: Naval Institute Press. ISBN 1-55750-263-3.
- Mohl, Michael. "R-13 (SS-90)". Navsource.net.
- Gardiner, Robert & Gray, Randal (1985). Conway's All the World's Fighting Ships 1906–1921. Annapolis, Maryland: Naval Institute Press. ISBN 0-85177-245-5.
- "R-13". Dictionary of American Naval Fighting Ships. Navy Department, Naval History and Heritage Command. This article incorporates text from this source, which is in the public domain.
- Hall, Anne Martin (1925). Ships of the United States navy and their sponsors, 1913-1923.
