= USS R-6 =

R-class submarine of the United States

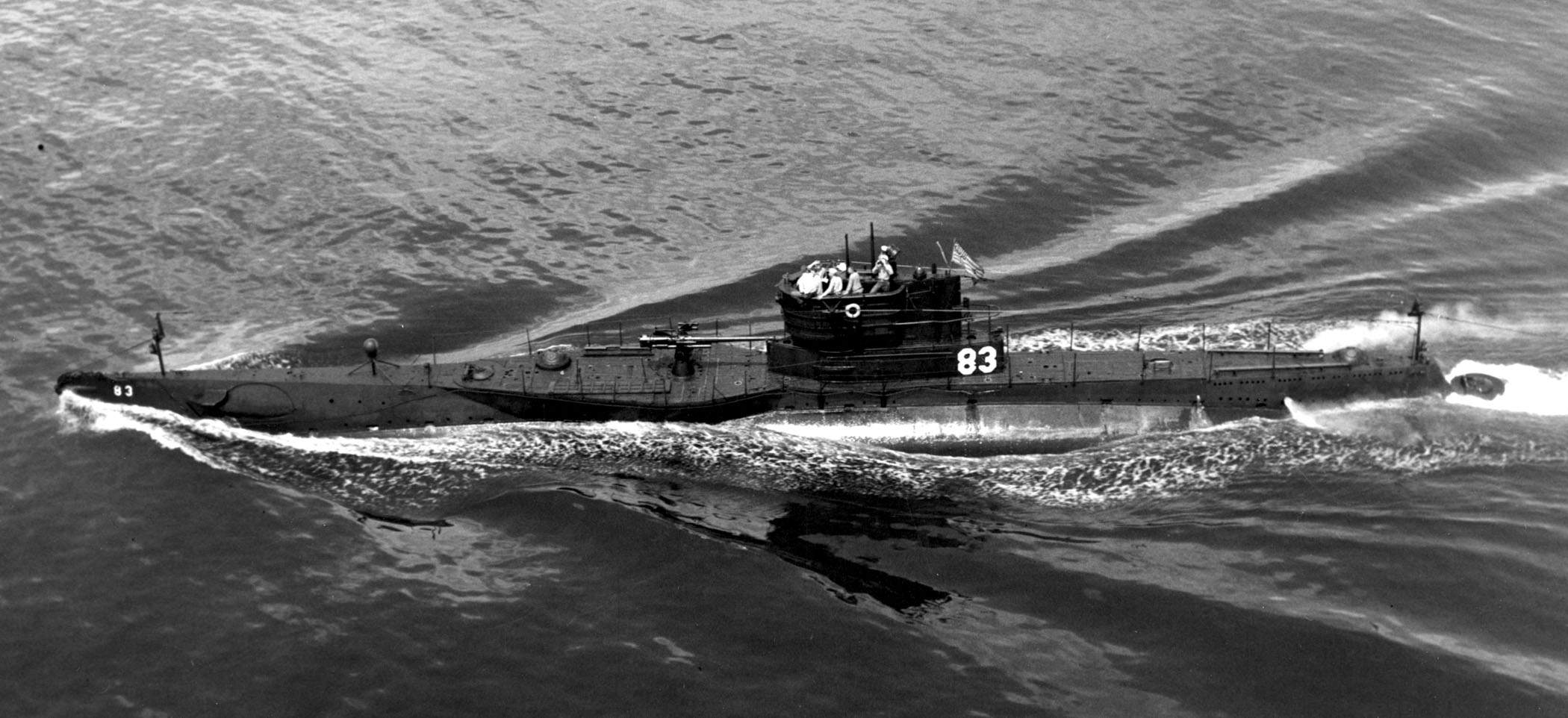
- USS R-6 underway while testing the first experimental U.S. Navy submarine snorkel in 1945.

History

United States
- Name: R-3
- Ordered: 29 August 1916
- Builder: Fore River Shipbuilding Company, Quincy, Massachusetts
- Cost: $717,188.00 (hull and machinery)
- Laid down: 17 December 1917
- Launched: 1 March 1919
- Sponsored by: Miss Katharine Langdon Hill
- Commissioned: 1 May 1919
- Decommissioned: 4 May 1931
- Recommissioned: 15 November 1940
- Decommissioned: 7 September 1945
- Stricken: 11 October 1945
- Identification: Hull symbol: SS-83 (17 July 1920); Call sign: NILK
- Fate: Sold for scrapping, 13 March 1946

General characteristics
- Class & type: R-1-class submarine
- Displacement: 574 long tons (583 t) surfaced; 685 long tons (696 t) submerged
- Length: 186 feet 3 inches (56.77 m)
- Beam: 18 ft (5.5 m)
- Draft: 15 ft 6 in (4.72 m)
- Installed power: 880 brake horsepower (656 kW) diesel; 934 hp (696 kW) electric
- Propulsion: 2 × NELSECO 6-EB-14 diesel engines; 2 × Electro-Dynamic Company electric motors; 2 × 60-cell batteries; 2 × Propellers
- Speed: 12.5 knots (23.2 km/h; 14.4 mph) surfaced; 9.3 kn (17.2 km/h; 10.7 mph) submerged
- Range: 4,700 nautical miles (8,700 km; 5,400 mi) at 6.2 kn (11.5 km/h; 7.1 mph), 7,000 nmi (13,000 km; 8,100 mi) if fuel loaded into the main ballast tanks
- Test depth: 200 ft (61 m)
- Capacity: 18,880 US gallons (71,500 L; 15,720 imp gal) fuel
- Complement: 2 officers; 27 enlisted
- Armament: 4 × 21-inch (533 mm) torpedo tubes (8 torpedoes); 1 × 3-inch (76 mm)/50-caliber deck gun

USS R-6 (SS-83), also known as "Submarine No. 83", was an R-1-class coastal and harbor defense submarines of the United States Navy commissioned after the end of World War I.

Due to space constraints, the boats built at the Fore River Shipbuilding Company yard, were laid down much later than the boats built at the Union Iron Works and the Lake Torpedo Boat Company yards. Because of this, none were commissioned before the end of WWI.

== Design ==
The R-boats built by the Fore River Shipbuilding Company, R-1 through R-14, and the Union Iron Works, R-15 through R-20, are sometimes considered a separate class, R-1-class, from those built by the Lake Torpedo Boat Company, R-21 through R-27, R-21-class.

The submarines had a length of 186 feet 3 inches (56.8 m) overall, a beam of 18 ft (5.5 m), and a mean draft of 15 ft 6 in (4.7 m). They displaced 574 long tons (583 t) on the surface and 685 long tons (696 t) submerged. The R-1-class submarines had a crew of 2 officers and 27 enlisted men. They had a diving depth of 200 ft (61.0 m).

For surface running, the boats were powered by two 440-brake-horsepower (328 kW) NELSECO 6-EB-14 diesel engines, each driving one propeller shaft. When submerged each propeller was driven by a 467-horsepower (348 kW) Electro-Dynamic Company electric motor. They could reach 12.5 knots (23.2 km/h; 14.4 mph) on the surface and 9.3 kn (17.2 km/h; 10.7 mph) underwater. On the surface, the R-1-class had a range of 4,700 nautical miles (8,700 km; 5,400 mi) at 6.2 kn (11.5 km/h; 7.1 mph), or 7,000 nmi (13,000 km; 8,100 mi) if fuel was loaded into their main ballast tanks.

The boats were armed with four 21-inch (533 mm) torpedo tubes in the bow. They carried four reloads, for a total of eight torpedoes. The R-1-class submarines were also armed with a single 3 in (76 mm)/50 caliber deck gun.

== Construction ==
R-6's keel was laid down on 17 December 1917, by the Fore River Shipbuilding Company, Quincy, Massachusetts. She was launched on 1 March 1919, sponsored by Miss Katherine Langdon Hill, daughter of former Governor of Maine, John F. Hill, and commissioned at Boston, Massachusetts, on 1 May 1919.

== Service history ==
=== 1919-1931 ===
After fitting out at the Boston Navy Yard, R-6 reported to Submarine Division 9 (SubDiv 9), of the Atlantic Fleet, at New London, Connecticut, on 16 September 1919. In early December, while anchored alongside the submarine tender Camden, and five other submarines, she was swept away by a gale and grounded on Black Rock, at the entrance to the harbor at New London. Once aground, she radioed for help and two minesweepers tried to pull her off the rocks, but to no avail. She was later freed and returned to service.

R-6 got underway on 4 December 1919, for Norfolk, Virginia, and winter exercises with her division in the Gulf of Mexico, from 21 January to 14 April 1920. She returned to New London, on 18 May 1920, for four months of summer maneuvers, before getting underway from New London, on 13 September 1920, for Norfolk, and overhaul.

When the US Navy adopted its hull classification system on 17 July 1920, she received the hull number SS-83.

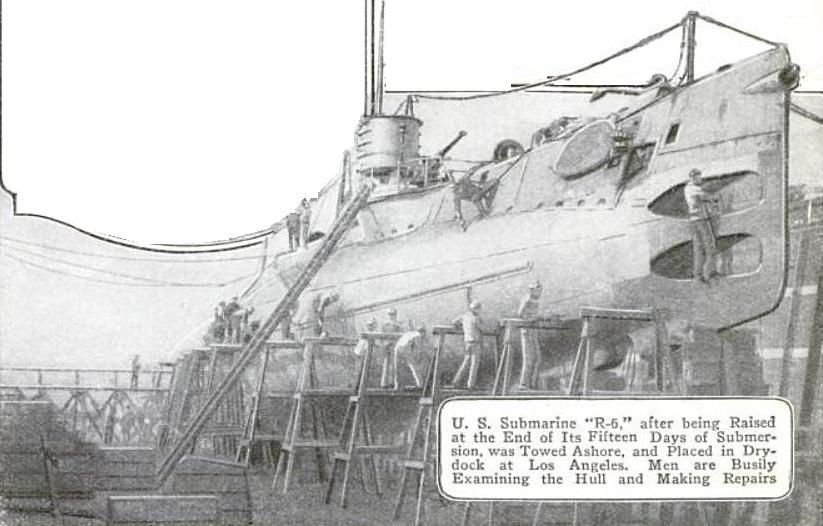
R-6 being reconditioned in dry dock, after sinking in 1921

With SubDiv 9, R-6 was ordered to the Pacific Fleet on 11 April 1921. The submarine transited the Panama Canal, on 28 May 1921, and arrived on 30 June 1921, at her new base, San Pedro Submarine Base, in San Pedro, California. Due to a malfunction in one of her torpedo tubes, she sank in San Pedro Harbor, on 26 September 1921, but was refloated on 13 October 1921, by her sister boat R-10 and the minesweeper Cardinal.

From 26 February to 2 March 1923, R-6 was used by Twentieth Century-Fox in making the motion picture The Eleventh Hour.

R-6 was transferred on 16 July 1923, to the Territory of Hawaii, where she remained for the next seven-and-a-half years, engaged in training and operations with fleet units.

R-6 was recalled to the Atlantic, on 12 December 1930. She transited the Panama Canal, on 18 January 1931, and arrived on 9 February 1931, at the Philadelphia Navy Yard, where she decommissioned on 4 May 1931.

=== 1940–1946 ===
Upon recommissioning at New London, on 15 November 1940, R-6 was assigned to SubDiv 42, and departed on 10 December 1941, for the submarine base at Coco Solo, in the Panama Canal Zone, where she remained until 16 June 1941. She was transferred to SubDiv 31, at Saint Thomas, in the US Virgin Islands, on 22 June 1941, and operated from there until returning to New London, on 8 October 1941, for a refit.

R-6 next joined the anti-U-boat patrol, operating roughly on a line between Nantucket Island, off Massachusetts, and Bermuda. Through 1942, she rotated between New London and Bermuda, conducting submerged periscope patrols by day, and surface patrols at night, to protect coastal traffic. From 1943 to mid-1945, she was employed primarily in training destroyers and destroyer escorts in anti-submarine warfare.

On 13 March 1943, R-6 was conducting torpedo exercises with the patrol boat Sapphire, in Block Island Sound, off the coast of Rhode Island, when four US Navy TBF-1 Avenger torpedo bombers of Air Group 16 mistakenly attacked her with depth charges 7 nautical miles (13 km; 8.1 mi) off the southwest corner of Block Island. The patrol boat Venture and boats from Montauk, New York, came to her assistance. R-6 surfaced with no casualties, or visible signs of damage, and proceeded to port under her own power.

R-6 was involved in testing the US version of the submarine snorkel between April and August 1945. The Dutch had invented and perfected the snorkel, and they had offered the technology to the US Navy, which rejected the offer. After invading the Netherlands, in May 1940, the Germans took the technology and incorporated it into their submarines late in World War II. The US Navy took notice of the German use of the snorkel and began to research a US version. Operating from Fort Lauderdale, Florida, R-6 tested the first US-made snorkel in August 1945. There is only one known set of photographs of the installation and configuration of the snorkel aboard R-6. Upon completion of trials of the snorkel, it was removed.

In August 1945, R-6 operated off Florida, in the Port Everglades-Key West area.

== Fate ==
She decommissioned at Key West on 27 September 1945 and was struck from the Naval Vessel Register on 11 October 1945. She was sold for scrap to Macey O. Scott, Miami, Florida, in March 1946.

== Bibliography ==
- "Table 21 - Ships on Navy List June 30, 1919". Congressional Serial Set. U.S. Government Printing Office: 770. 1921.
- Friedman, Norman (1995). U.S. Submarines Through 1945: An Illustrated Design History. Annapolis, Maryland: Naval Institute Press. ISBN 1-55750-263-3.
- Mohl, Michael. "R-6 (SS-83)". Navsource.net.
- Gardiner, Robert & Gray, Randal (1985). Conway's All the World's Fighting Ships 1906–1921. Annapolis, Maryland: Naval Institute Press. ISBN 0-85177-245-5.
- "R-6". Dictionary of American Naval Fighting Ships. Navy Department, Naval History and Heritage Command. This article incorporates text from this source, which is in the public domain.
- Hall, Anne Martin (1925). Ships of the United States navy and their sponsors, 1913-1923.
- Hinman, Charles R.; Campbell, Douglas E. (2019). The Submarine Has No Friends: Friendly Fire Incidents Involving U.S. Submarines During World War II. Syneca Research Group, Inc. ISBN 978-0-359-76906-3.
- Submarine Casualties Booklet. U.S. Naval Submarine School. 1966. Archived from the original on 11 September 2009.
- Hedman, Ric; Johnston, David (16 March 2025). "R-6". pigboats.com.
