= SS-100 =

SS-100 or SS 100 may refer to:

- SS-100-X, the United States Secret Service code name for the Presidential limousine used by President John F. Kennedy
- Brough Superior SS100, a motorcycle
- SS Jaguar 100, an automobile
- Sukhoi Superjet 100, a regional jet
- USS R-23 (SS-100), a United States Navy submarine which saw service during World War I
