= SS-103 =

SS-103 or SS 103 may refer to:

- SS Heavy Panzer Battalion 103, a unit of the German Army
- USS R-26 (SS-103), a United States Navy submarine which saw service during World War I
