= United States R-class submarine =

United States Navy submarine class

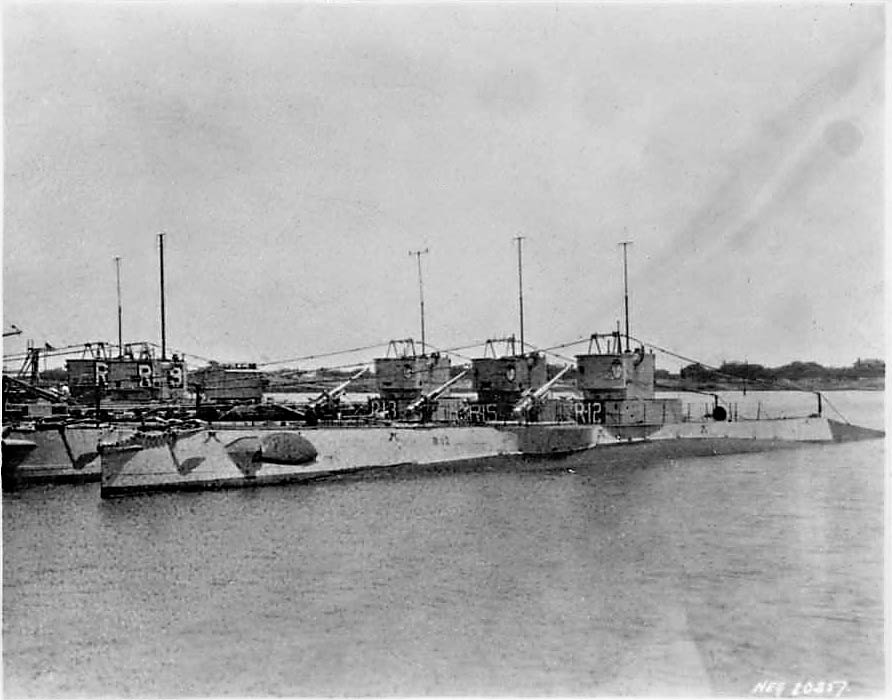
- Tied up along the dock from right to left: USS R-12, USS R-15, USS R-13, with USS R-9, and an unidentified R-boat, probably in Pearl Harbor, c. mid-1920s

Class overview
- Name: R class
- Builders: Bethlehem Quincy, Quincy, Massachusetts (R-1 to R-14); Bethlehem San Francisco, San Francisco, California (R-15 to R-20); Lake Torpedo Boat Company, Bridgeport, Connecticut (R-21 to R-27); Electric Boat Company (Four boats for Peru)
- Operators: United States Navy; Peruvian Navy; Royal Navy
- Preceded by: O class
- Succeeded by: S class
- Built: 1917–1919
- In commission: 1918–1931, 1940–1945
- Completed: 27
- Lost: 2
- Retired: 25

General characteristics
- Class & type: R-1-class (R-1 to R-20)
- Type: Submarine
- Displacement: 574 long tons (583 t) surfaced; 685 long tons (696 t) submerged
- Length: 186 feet 3 inches (56.77 m)
- Beam: 18 ft 0 in (5.49 m)
- Draft: 15 ft 6 in (4.72 m)
- Installed power: 880 brake horsepower (656 kW) diesel; 934 hp (696 kW) electric
- Propulsion: 2 × NELSECO 6-EB-14 diesel engines; 2 × Electro-Dynamic Company electric motors; 2 × 60-cell batteries; 2 × Propellers
- Speed: 12.5 knots (23.2 km/h; 14.4 mph) surfaced; 9.3 kn (17.2 km/h; 10.7 mph) submerged
- Range: 4,700 nautical miles (8,700 km; 5,400 mi) at 6.2 kn (11.5 km/h; 7.1 mph), 7,000 nmi (13,000 km; 8,100 mi) if fuel loaded into the main ballast tanks
- Test depth: 200 ft (61 m)
- Capacity: 18,880 US gallons (71,500 L; 15,720 imp gal) fuel
- Complement: 2 officers; 27 enlisted
- Armament: 4 × 21-inch (533 mm) torpedo tubes (8 torpedoes); 1 × 3-inch (76 mm)/50-caliber deck gun

General characteristics
- Class & type: R-21-class (R-21 to R-27)
- Type: Submarine
- Displacement: 497 long tons (505 t) surfaced; 652 long tons (662 t) submerged
- Length: 175 ft (53 m)
- Beam: 16 ft 7 in (5.05 m)
- Draft: 13 ft 11 in (4.24 m)
- Installed power: 500 bhp (373 kW) diesel; 400 hp (298 kW) electric
- Propulsion: 2 × Busch-Sulzer diesel engines; 2 × Diehl electric motors; 1 × 120-cell battery; 2 × Propellers
- Speed: 14 kn (26 km/h; 16 mph) surfaced; 11.4 kn (21.1 km/h; 13.1 mph) submerged
- Test depth: 200 ft (61 m)
- Capacity: 17,922 US gal (67,840 L; 14,923 imp gal) fuel
- Complement: 3 officers; 23 enlisted
- Armament: 4 × 21-inch torpedo tubes (8 torpedoes); 1 × 3-inch/50-caliberdeck gun

The R-class submarines were a class of United States Navy coastal patrol submarines active from 1918 until 1945. With the first of the class laid down following the American entry into World War I, they were built rapidly. Although R-15 through R-20 were completed July–October 1918, they did not serve overseas, and the bulk of the class were not completed until after the Armistice. As had been the usual practice in several of the preceding classes, design and construction of the 27 boats of this class was split between the Electric Boat Company and the Lake Torpedo Boat Company. Both designs were built to the same military operational specifications, but differed considerably in design and detail specifics.

== Design ==
=== Electric Boat ===
Boats R-1 through R-20, also referred to as the R-1-class, were designed by Electric Boat and built by the company's subcontractor yards Bethlehem Quincy and Bethlehem San Francisco. These single-hull boats were structurally similar to the preceding O-class, but larger and therefore with more powerful machinery to maintain the required speed. Electric Boat departed from their traditional rotating bow cap that acted as the muzzle doors for the torpedo tubes. All submarines from the R-class forward built by this company would have individual muzzle doors. For the first time in a US submarine class, 21-inch (533 mm) torpedo tubes were fitted, a tube diameter that is still standard worldwide. A more powerful non-retractable 3-inch (76 mm)/50-caliber deck gun replaced the retractable 3-inch/23-caliber gun found on previous classes.

=== Lake ===
Boats R-21 to R-27, also referred to as the R-21-class, which were slightly smaller and faster than the Electric Boat design, were designed and built by the Lake Torpedo Boat Company. Simon Lake finally gave up on his patented zero-angle (aka "even-keel") diving method with midships-mounted diving planes, and adopted the Electric Boat style angled diving method using bow and stern mounted diving planes. The Lake-style flat shovel stern with ventrally mounted rudder, diving planes, and propellers were retained for this class. There is conflicting information as to what size torpedo tubes were mounted in the Lake boats, with authoritative references by Gardiner and Friedman disagreeing as to whether they were equipped with 18-inch (450 mm) torpedo tubes or the 21-inch tubes of the Electric Boat design. They were equipped with the same 3-inch/50-caliber deck gun as the Electric Boat design. At least one boat, R-22, was fitted with an expanded bow buoyancy tank that gave it a humped appearance. This was done to improve surface sea keeping. Unlike the Electric Boat design group, most of which survived to serve in World War II, the Lake boats were scrapped in 1930, as part of the Navy's compliance with the London Naval Treaty. The Lake company's demise in 1924, and poorly regarded design features, also contributed to this.

== Service ==
=== 1919 to 1940 ===
Most of the Electric Boat design group spent the 1920s in the Pacific, operating out of San Diego and Hawaii. In 1921, one member of this group, R-14, was stranded at sea in the Pacific, off Hawaii, when it ran out of fuel during a search and rescue operation. The boat rigged makeshift sails and sailed 140 nmi (260 km; 160 mi) to Hilo, Hawaii. The Hawaii-based boats returned to the mainland, on 18 January 1931, and were decommissioned to reserve status, at the Philadelphia Navy Yard, in 1931.

In the aftermath of S-4's disaster in 1927, all of the EB design boats were modified for greater safety. A motor room escape hatch was added, the motor room being the after most compartment. The tapered after casing became a step as a result of this modification. The boats also received salvage air connections and mating surfaces around topside hatches to allow the McCann Rescue Chamber to rescue trapped crewmen.

=== World War II ===
As the war emergency in Europe became more urgent, most of the boats were recommissioned in 1940, conducting patrols in the Caribbean, or being used as sonar targets at Key West, Florida. They also patrolled between Submarine Base New London, in Connecticut, and Bermuda. At least two R-boats unsuccessfully fired torpedoes at German U-boats on the Bermuda patrols.

During the war, several R class boats operated out of Key West, being assigned to support the Fleet Sonar School. They served primarily as sonar targets for training crews of destroyers and destroyer escorts in anti-submarine warfare. They also conducted patrols in the Florida Strait, and the Yucatán Channel.

Three boats, R-3, R-17, and R-19, were transferred to the United Kingdom's Royal Navy, as HMS P.511, HMS P.512, and HMS P.514 in 1941-1942. P.514 was lost on 21 June 1942, in a collision with the Canadian minesweeper HMCS Georgian due to being mistaken for a U-boat. R-12 was lost on 12 June 1943, while underway off Key West. While the cause of her loss has never been definitively determined, when her wreck was found by the in 2010, by the Lost 52 Project, it was suspected that the old boat suffered from a hull failure in the forward battery compartment.

Between May and September 1945, the 15 remaining R boats in the US Navy were decommissioned and subsequently scrapped.

== Peruvian R boats ==
Electric Boat built four variants of the R class for the Peruvian Navy (BAP R-1 to R-4). Built after World War I, using materials assembled from cancelled S-class submarines, they were refitted in 1935–1936 and 1955–1956, and renamed Islay, Casma, Pacocha, and Arica in 1957. These were the first submarines built directly by Electric Boat, at their newly established shipyard along the Thames River, in Connecticut. They were discarded in 1960.

== Wreck of R-8 ==
In December 2020, the remains of R-8 were discovered off the coast of Ocean City, Maryland. The vessel sank there in 1936, after being used for target practice by bomber aircraft.

== Boats in class ==
The 27 submarines of the R class were:

Construction data for the Electric Boat design
Ship name	Hull class and no.	Builder	Laid down	Launched	Comm.	Decomm.	Reclass. hull no.	Reclass. hull no. date	Fate
R-1	Submarine No. 78	Bethlehem Quincy, Quincy, Massachusetts	16 October 1917	24 August 1918	16 December 1918	20 September 1945	SS-78	17 July 1920	Sold for scrap, 13 March 1946
R-2	Submarine No. 79	Bethlehem Quincy, Quincy, Massachusetts	16 October 1917	23 September 1918	24 January 1919	10 May 1945	SS-79	17 July 1920	Scrapped, early 1946
R-3	Submarine No. 80	Bethlehem Quincy, Quincy, Massachusetts	11 December 1917	18 January 1919	17 April 1919	4 November 1941	SS-80	17 July 1920	Transferred to United Kingdom, scrapped, 1948
R-4	Submarine No. 81	Bethlehem Quincy, Quincy, Massachusetts	16 October 1917	26 October 1918	28 March 1919	18 June 1945	SS-81	17 July 1920	Sold for scrapping, 22 January 1946
R-5	Submarine No. 82	Bethlehem Quincy, Quincy, Massachusetts	16 October 1917	24 November 1918	15 April 1919	14 September 1945	SS-82	17 July 1920	Sold for scrapping, 22 August 1946
R-6	Submarine No. 83	Bethlehem Quincy, Quincy, Massachusetts	17 December 1917	1 March 1919	1 May 1919	27 September 1945	SS-83	17 July 1920	Sold for scrapping, 13 March 1946
R-7	Submarine No. 84	Bethlehem Quincy, Quincy, Massachusetts	6 December 1917	5 April 1919	1 May 1919	14 September 1945	SS-84	17 July 1920	Sold for scrapping, 4 September 1946
R-8	Submarine No. 85	Bethlehem Quincy, Quincy, Massachusetts	4 March 1918	17 April 1919	21 July 1919	2 May 1931, sank at moorings 1936	SS-85	17 July 1920	Raised and expended as target, 19 August 1936
R-9	Submarine No. 86	Bethlehem Quincy, Quincy, Massachusetts	6 March 1918	24 May 1919	30 July 1919	25 September 1945	SS-86	17 July 1920	Sold for scrapping, February 1946
R-10	Submarine No. 87	Bethlehem Quincy, Quincy, Massachusetts	21 March 1918	28 June 1919	20 August 1919	18 June 1945	SS-87	17 July 1920	Sold for scrapping, 22 January 1946
R-11	Submarine No. 88	Bethlehem Quincy, Quincy, Massachusetts	18 March 1918	21 July 1919	5 September 1919	5 September 1945	SS-88	17 July 1920	Sold for scrapping, 13 March 1946
R-12	Submarine No. 89	Bethlehem Quincy, Quincy, Massachusetts	28 March 1918	15 August 1919	23 September 1919	—N/a	SS-89	17 July 1920	Sank during training exercise, 12 June 1943
R-13	Submarine No. 90	Bethlehem Quincy, Quincy, Massachusetts	27 March 1918	27 August 1919	17 October 1919	14 September 1945	SS-90	17 July 1920	Sold for scrapping, 13 March 1946
R-14	Submarine No. 91	Bethlehem Quincy, Quincy, Massachusetts	6 November 1918	10 October 1919	24 December 1919	7 May 1945	SS-91	17 July 1920	Sold for scrapping, 28 September 1945
R-15	Submarine No. 92	Bethlehem San Francisco, San Francisco, California	30 April 1917	10 December 1917	27 July 1918	17 September 1945	SS-92	17 July 1920	Sold for scrapping, 13 March 1946
R-16	Submarine No. 93	Bethlehem San Francisco, San Francisco, California	26 April 1917	15 December 1917	5 August 1918	16 July 1945	SS-93	17 July 1920	Sold for scrapping on 22 January 1946
R-17	Submarine No. 94	Bethlehem San Francisco, San Francisco, California	5 May 1917	24 December 1917	18 August 1918	9 March 1942	SS-94	17 July 1920	Transferred to United Kingdom; sold for scrapping, 16 November 1945
R-18	Submarine No. 95	Bethlehem San Francisco, San Francisco, California	16 June 1917	8 January 1918	11 September 1918	19 September 1945	SS-95	17 July 1920	Sold for scrapping, 4 September 1946
R-19	Submarine No. 96	Bethlehem San Francisco, San Francisco, California	23 June 1917	28 January 1918	7 October 1918	9 March 1942	SS-96	17 July 1920	Transferred to United Kingdom; rammed and sunk by HMCS Georgian, 21 June 1942
R-20	Submarine No. 97	Bethlehem San Francisco, San Francisco, California	4 June 1917	21 January 1918	26 October 1918	27 September 1945	SS-97	17 July 1920	Sold for scrapping, 13 March 1946
R-21	Submarine No. 98	Lake Torpedo Boat Company, Bridgeport, Connecticut	19 April 1917	10 July 1918	17 June 1919	21 June 1924	SS-98	17 July 1920	Sold for scrapping, 30 July 1930
R-22	Submarine No. 99	Lake Torpedo Boat Company, Bridgeport, Connecticut	19 April 1917	23 September 1918	1 August 1919	29 April 1925	SS-99	17 July 1920	Sold for scrapping, 30 July 1930
R-23	Submarine No. 100	Lake Torpedo Boat Company, Bridgeport, Connecticut	25 April 1917	5 November 1918	23 October 1919	25 April 1925	SS-100	17 July 1920	Sold for scrapping, 30 July 1930
R-24	Submarine No. 101	Lake Torpedo Boat Company, Bridgeport, Connecticut	9 May 1917	21 August 1918	27 June 1919	11 June 1925	SS-101	17 July 1920	Sold for scrapping, 30 July 1930
R-25	Submarine No. 102	Lake Torpedo Boat Company, Bridgeport, Connecticut	26 April 1917	15 May 1919	23 October 1919	21 June 1924	SS-102	17 July 1920	Sold for scrapping, 30 July 1930
R-26	Submarine No. 103	Lake Torpedo Boat Company, Bridgeport, Connecticut	26 April 1917	18 June 1919	23 October 1919	12 June 1925	SS-103	17 July 1920	Sold for scrapping, 30 July 1930
R-27	Submarine No. 104	Lake Torpedo Boat Company, Bridgeport, Connecticut	16 May 1917	23 September 1918	3 September 1919	24 April 1925	SS-104	17 July 1920	Sold for scrapping, 30 July 1930

== Bibliography ==
- Friedman, Norman (1995). U.S. Submarines Through 1945: An Illustrated Design History. Annapolis, Maryland: United States Naval Institute. ISBN 1-55750-263-3.
- Michael, Mohl. "R-1 (SS-78)". Navsource.net.
- Gary, Priolo. "R-21 (SS-98)". Navsource.net.
- Hedman, Ric; Johnston, David (19 October 2025). "R-class Design and Construction Notes". Pigboats.com.
- Hedman, Ric; Johnston, David (19 October 2025a). "O-class Design and Construction Notes". Pigboats.com.
- Gardiner, Robert (1985). Conway's All the World's Fighting Ships 1906–1921. Conway Maritime Press. ISBN 0-85177-245-5.
- Hedman, Ric; Johnston, David (17 March 2025b). "R-22 (SS-99)". Pigboats.com.
- Hedman, Ric; Johnston, David (16 March 2025c). "R-14 (SS-91)". Pigboats.com.
- Johnston, David L.; Hedman, Ric (2022). A Good and Favorable Wind: The Unusual Story of a Submarine Under Sail and its Cautionary Lessons for the Modern Navy. Nimble Books LLC. ISBN 978-1-60888-200-7.
- Hedman, Ric; Johnston, David (16 March 2025d). "R-12 (SS-89)". Pigboats.com.
- Rodengen, Jeffrey L. (2006). The Legend of Electric Boat (2nd ed.). Write Stuff Enterprises, Inc. ISBN 1-932022-18-X.
- "American submarine discovered off Ocean City coast". Baltimore Sun. 10 December 2020.
