= SS-102 =

SS-102 or SS 102 may refer to:

- SS Heavy Panzer Battalion 102, a unit of the German Army
- USS R-25 (SS-102), a United States Navy submarine which saw service during World War I
