= USS R-25 =

R-class submarine of the United States

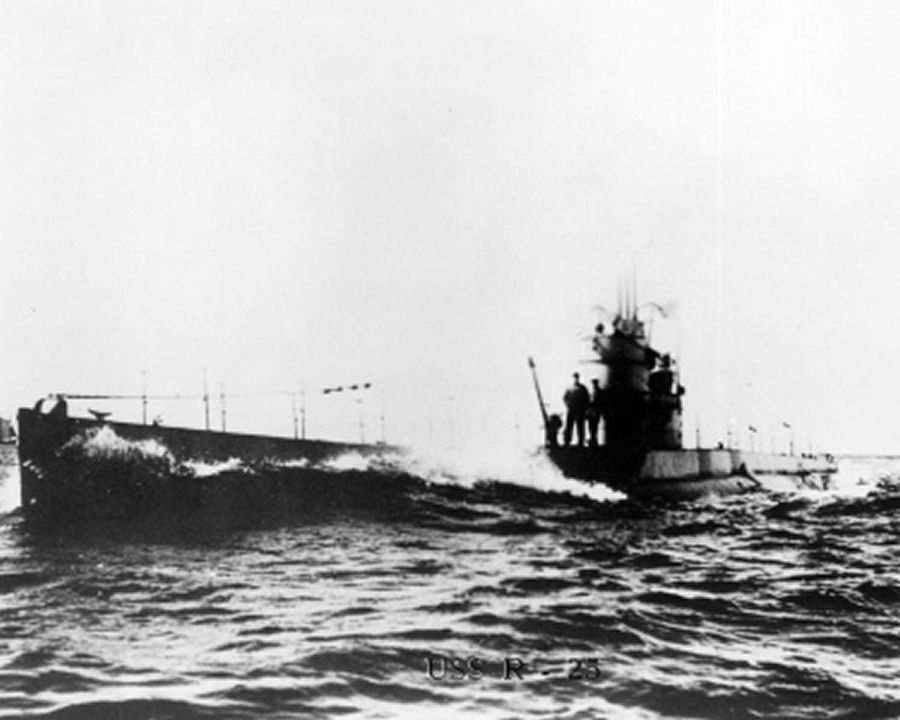
- USS R-25, probably at the Lake Torpedo Boat Company. at Bridgeport, Connecticut, in 1919

History

United States
- Name: R-25
- Ordered: 29 August 1916
- Builder: Lake Torpedo Boat Company, Bridgeport, Connecticut
- Cost: $848,818.04 (hull and machinery)
- Laid down: 26 April 1917
- Launched: 15 May 1919
- Sponsored by: Mrs. Rosalinda Robinson
- Commissioned: 23 October 1919
- Decommissioned: 21 June 1924
- Stricken: 9 May 1930
- Identification: Hull symbol: SS-102 (17 July 1920); Call sign: NIMC
- Fate: Sold for scrap, 30 July 1930

General characteristics
- Class & type: R-21-class submarine
- Displacement: 497 long tons (505 t) surfaced; 652 long tons (662 t) submerged
- Length: 175 feet (53 m)
- Beam: 16 ft 7 in (5.05 m)
- Draft: 13 ft 11 in (4.24 m)
- Installed power: 1,000 brake horsepower (746 kW) diesel; 800 hp (597 kW) electric
- Propulsion: 2 × Busch-Sulzer diesel engines; 2 × Diehl Manufacture Company electric motors; 1 × 120-cell batteries; 2 × Propellers
- Speed: 14 knots (26 km/h; 16 mph) surfaced; 11 kn (20 km/h; 13 mph) submerged
- Range: 3,523 nautical miles (6,525 km; 4,054 mi) at 11 kn (20 km/h; 13 mph), 6,499 nmi (12,036 km; 7,479 mi) if fuel loaded into the main ballast tanks
- Test depth: 200 ft (61 m)
- Capacity: 17,922 US gallons (67,840 L; 14,923 imp gal) fuel
- Complement: 3 officers; 23 enlisted
- Armament: 4 × 21-inch (533 mm) torpedo tubes (8 torpedoes); 1 × 3-inch (76 mm)/50-caliber deck gun

USS R-25 (SS-102), also known as "Submarine No. 102", was an R-21-class coastal and harbor defense submarines of the United States Navy commissioned after the end of World War I.

== Design ==
The R-boats built by the Lake Torpedo Boat Company, R-21 through R-27, are sometimes considered a separate class, R-21-class, from those built by the Fore River Shipbuilding Company, R-1 through R-14, and the Union Iron Works, R-15 through R-20, R-1-class.

The submarines had a length of 175 feet (53.3 m) overall, a beam of 16 ft 7 in (5.1 m), and a mean draft of 13 ft 11 in (4.2 m). They displaced 497 long tons (505 t) on the surface and 652 long tons (662 t) submerged. The R-21-class submarines had a crew of 3 officers and 23 enlisted men. They had a diving depth of 200 ft (61.0 m).

For surface running, the boats were powered by two 500-brake-horsepower (373 kW) Busch-Sulzer diesel engines, each driving one propeller shaft. When submerged each propeller was driven by a 400-horsepower (298 kW) Diehl Manufacture Company electric motor. They could reach 14 knots (26 km/h; 16 mph) on the surface and 11 kn (20 km/h; 13 mph) underwater. On the surface, the R-21-class had a range of 3,523 nautical miles (6,525 km; 4,054 mi) at 11 kn (20 km/h; 13 mph), or 6,499 nmi (12,036 km; 7,479 mi) if fuel was loaded into their main ballast tanks.

The boats were armed with four 21-inch (533 mm) torpedo tubes in the bow. They carried four reloads, for a total of eight torpedoes. The R-21-class submarines were also armed with a single 3 in (76 mm)/50 caliber deck gun.

== Construction ==
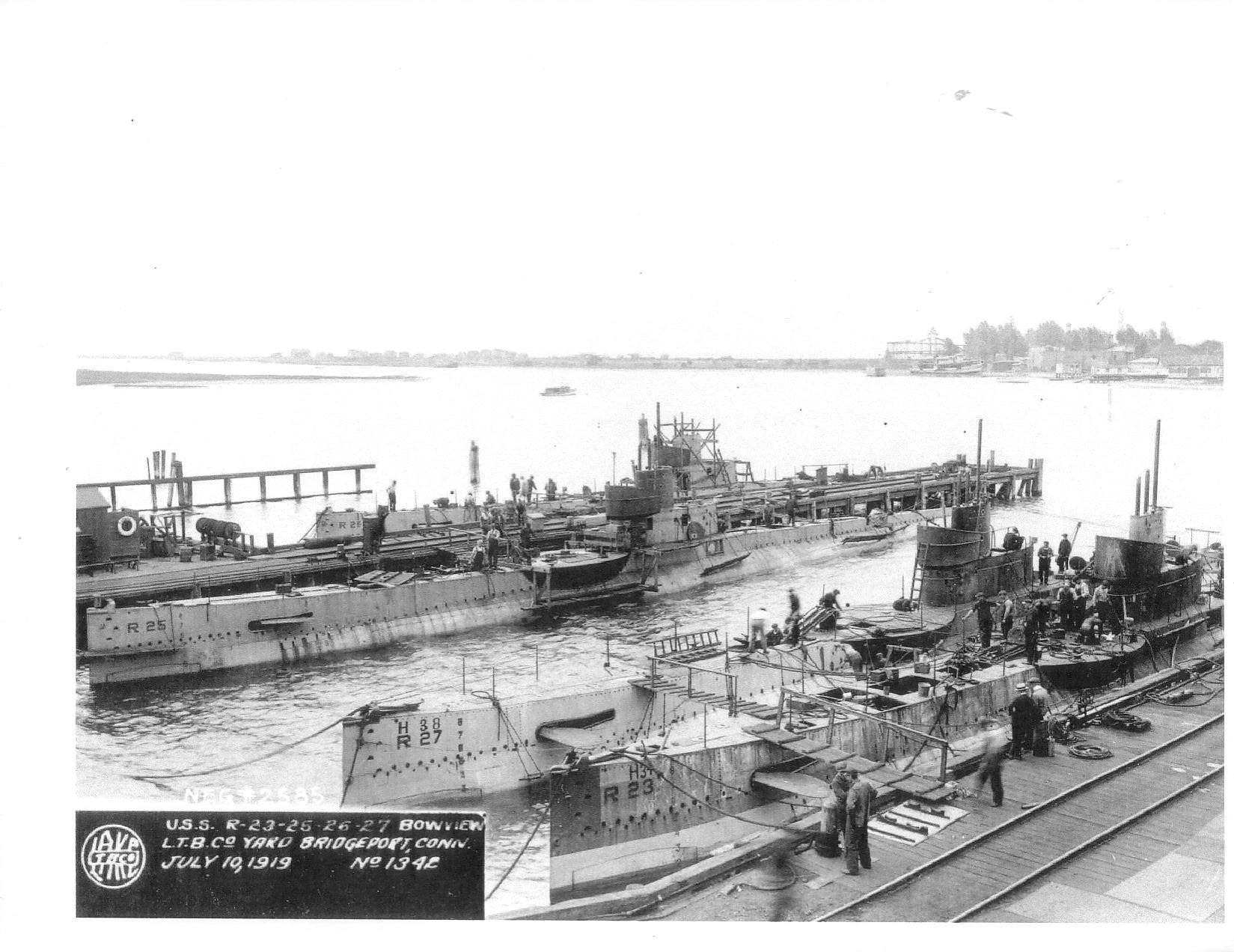
USS R-25 in Bridgeport during 1919

R-25's keel was laid down on 26 April 1917, by the Lake Torpedo Boat Company, in Bridgeport, Connecticut. She was launched on 15 May 1919, sponsored by Mrs. Rosalinda Robinson, and commissioned on 23 October 1919 with future Vice Admiral and Commander, Submarines, Southwest Pacific (COMSUBSOWESPAC), Lieutenant Commander Charles A. Lockwood, Jr., in command.

== Service record ==
At the end of November, R-25 got underway for her homeport, Coco Solo, in the Panama Canal Zone, arriving 11 January 1920.

When the US Navy adopted its hull classification system on 17 July 1920, she received the hull number SS-102.

Except for overhaul periods at Balboa, and on the East Coast, R-25 operated in the waters off the Panama Canal Zone, until the fall of 1923.

== Fate ==
In November of that year she arrived at the Philadelphia Navy Yard, and underwent inactivation overhaul. On 21 June 1924, she was decommissioned after just over four-and-a-half years of service. She was laid up at League Island, until she was struck from the Naval Vessel Register on 9 May 1930, and sold for scrap on 30 July 1930.

== Bibliography ==
- "Table 21 - Ships on Navy List June 30, 1919". Congressional Serial Set. U.S. Government Printing Office: 770. 1921.
- Friedman, Norman (1995). U.S. Submarines Through 1945: An Illustrated Design History. Annapolis, Maryland: Naval Institute Press. ISBN 1-55750-263-3.
- Priolo, Gary. "R-25 (SS-102)". Navsource.net.
- Gardiner, Robert & Gray, Randal (1985). Conway's All the World's Fighting Ships 1906–1921. Annapolis, Maryland: Naval Institute Press. ISBN 0-85177-245-5.
- "R-25". Dictionary of American Naval Fighting Ships. Navy Department, Naval History and Heritage Command. 26 August 2015. This article incorporates text from this source, which is in the public domain.
- Hall, Anne Martin (1925). Ships of the United States navy and their sponsors, 1913-1923.
