= William Woodnut Griscom =

American inventor

William Woodnut Griscom (c. 1851–1897) was an American inventor, credited with introducing electric motors for the purpose of marine propulsion. He also founded the Electro-Dynamic Company in 1880, based in Philadelphia, and had around 40 patents to his name. In 1881 The Franklin Institute awarded him what was then their highest honor, the Elliott Cresson Medal, for a combination motor and battery that powered a sewing machine. In 1892, Isaac Rice bailed Electro-Dynamic out following a bankruptcy and became a co-owner. Two years after Griscom died in an 1897 hunting accident, his company was acquired by Rice's new Electric Boat Company. He is buried at the Church of the Redeemer Cemetery in Bryn Mawr, Pennsylvania.

== Sources ==
- Electric Boat Corporation, James S. Reyburn
- General Dynamics Electric Boat Division official history site
