= USS R-20 =

R-class submarine of the United States

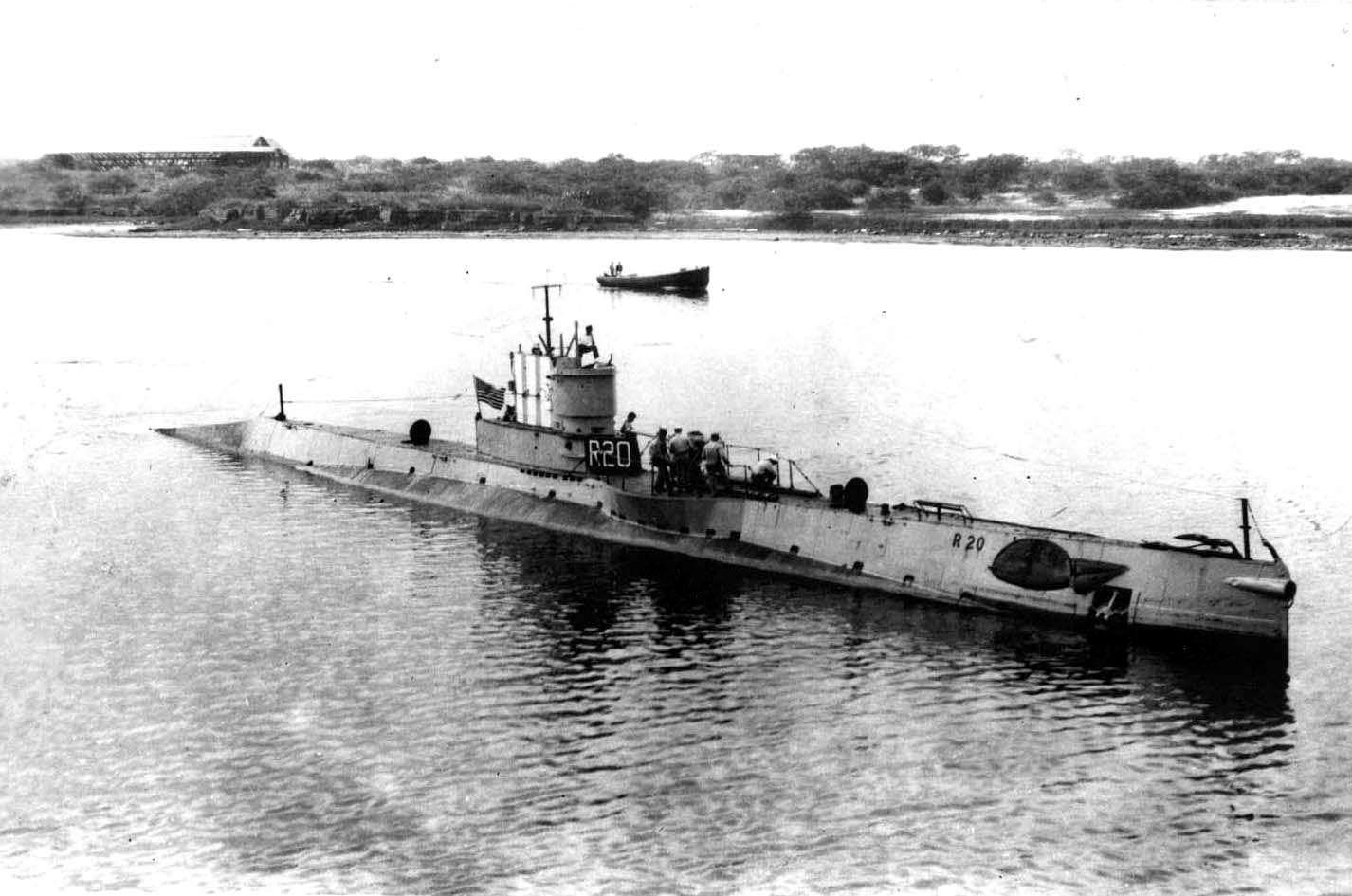
- USS R-20 (SS-97) possibly in the Thames River, near New London, Connecticut, sometime between April and June 1941, note the three large white "|" painted on the submarine's fairwater for recognition

History

United States
- Name: R-20
- Ordered: 29 August 1916
- Builder: Union Iron Works, San Francisco, California
- Cost: $786,854.67 (hull and machinery)
- Laid down: 4 June 1917
- Launched: 21 January 1918
- Sponsored by: Mrs. Maud Foster
- Commissioned: 26 October 1918
- Decommissioned: 15 May 1931
- Recommissioned: 22 January 1941
- Decommissioned: 27 September 1945
- Stricken: 11 October 1945
- Identification: Hull symbol: SS-97 (17 July 1920); Call sign: NARZ
- Fate: Sold for scrapping, 13 March 1946

General characteristics
- Class & type: R-1-class submarine
- Displacement: 574 long tons (583 t) surfaced; 685 long tons (696 t) submerged
- Length: 186 feet 3 inches (56.77 m)
- Beam: 18 ft (5.5 m)
- Draft: 15 ft 6 in (4.72 m)
- Installed power: 880 brake horsepower (656 kW) diesel; 934 hp (696 kW) electric
- Propulsion: 2 × NELSECO 6-EB-14 diesel engines; 2 × Electro-Dynamic Company electric motors; 2 × 60-cell batteries; 2 × Propellers
- Speed: 12.5 knots (23.2 km/h; 14.4 mph) surfaced; 9.3 kn (17.2 km/h; 10.7 mph) submerged
- Range: 4,700 nautical miles (8,700 km; 5,400 mi) at 6.2 kn (11.5 km/h; 7.1 mph), 7,000 nmi (13,000 km; 8,100 mi) if fuel loaded into the main ballast tanks
- Test depth: 200 ft (61 m)
- Capacity: 18,880 US gallons (71,500 L; 15,720 imp gal) fuel
- Complement: 2 officers; 27 enlisted
- Armament: 4 × 21-inch (533 mm) torpedo tubes (8 torpedoes); 1 × 3-inch (76 mm)/50-caliber deck gun

USS R-20 (SS-97), also known as "Submarine No. 97", was an R-1-class coastal and harbor defense submarines of the United States Navy commissioned shortly before the end of World War I.

She was recommissioned before the US entered World War II, for use as a training boat.

== Design ==
The R-boats built by the Fore River Shipbuilding Company, R-1 through R-14, and the Union Iron Works, R-15 through R-20, are sometimes considered a separate class, R-1-class, from those built by the Lake Torpedo Boat Company, R-21 through R-27, R-21-class.

The submarines had a length of 186 feet 3 inches (56.8 m) overall, a beam of 18 ft (5.5 m), and a mean draft of 15 ft 6 in (4.7 m). They displaced 574 long tons (583 t) on the surface and 685 long tons (696 t) submerged. The R-1-class submarines had a crew of 2 officers and 27 enlisted men. They had a diving depth of 200 ft (61.0 m).

For surface running, the boats were powered by two 440-brake-horsepower (328 kW) NELSECO 6-EB-14 diesel engines, each driving one propeller shaft. When submerged each propeller was driven by a 467-horsepower (348 kW) Electro-Dynamic Company electric motor. They could reach 12.5 knots (23.2 km/h; 14.4 mph) on the surface and 9.3 kn (17.2 km/h; 10.7 mph) underwater. On the surface, the R-1-class had a range of 4,700 nautical miles (8,700 km; 5,400 mi) at 6.2 kn (11.5 km/h; 7.1 mph), or 7,000 nmi (13,000 km; 8,100 mi) if fuel was loaded into their main ballast tanks.

The boats were armed with four 21-inch (533 mm) torpedo tubes in the bow. They carried four reloads, for a total of eight torpedoes. The R-1-class submarines were also armed with a single 3 in (76 mm)/50 caliber deck gun.

== Construction ==
R-20's keel was laid down on 4 June 1917, by the Union Iron Works, in San Francisco, California. She was launched on 21 January 1918, sponsored by Mrs. Maud Foster, and commissioned on 26 October 1918, with future Vice Admiral, Lieutenant Commander Alfred E. Montgomery in command.

== Service history ==
=== 1918–1931 ===
Fitted out at San Pedro, California, R-20 remained off southern California, operating between San Pedro and San Diego, until March 1919. She then moved to San Francisco; underwent overhaul, and on 17 June got underway for the Territory of Hawaii. She arrived at the newly commission Naval Submarine Base Pearl Harbor, on 25 June.

When the US Navy adopted its hull classification system on 17 July 1920, she received the hull number SS-97.

She served with the fleet, training submarine personnel, and assisting in the development of submarine equipment, and tactics, for over a decade. On 12 December 1930, she departed Pearl Harbor, and headed for the Philadelphia Navy Yard, and inactivation. She arrived at Philadelphia, on 9 February 1931; decommissioned on 15 May; and was berthed at League Island.

=== 1941–1946 ===
R-20 recommissioned on 22 January 1941. In April she shifted to New London, Connecticut. There she trained personnel and conducted patrols until June. She then moved south to Key West, Florida, arriving on 22 June, to spend the remainder of her career as a training ship.

== Fate ==
R-20 decommissioned at Key West, on 27 September 1945, and was struck from the Naval Vessel Register on 11 October 1945. On 13 March 1946, she was sold to Macey O. Scott, of Miami, Florida.

== Bibliography ==
- "Table 21 - Ships on Navy List June 30, 1919". Congressional Serial Set. U.S. Government Printing Office: 770. 1921.
- Friedman, Norman (1995). U.S. Submarines Through 1945: An Illustrated Design History. Annapolis, Maryland: Naval Institute Press. ISBN 1-55750-263-3.
- Priolo, Gary. "R-20 (SS-97)". Navsource.net.
- Gardiner, Robert & Gray, Randal (1985). Conway's All the World's Fighting Ships 1906–1921. Annapolis, Maryland: Naval Institute Press. ISBN 0-85177-245-5.
- "R-20". Dictionary of American Naval Fighting Ships. Navy Department, Naval History and Heritage Command. This article incorporates text from this source, which is in the public domain.
- Hall, Anne Martin (1925). Ships of the United States navy and their sponsors, 1913-1923.
