= USS R-15 =

R-class submarine of the United States

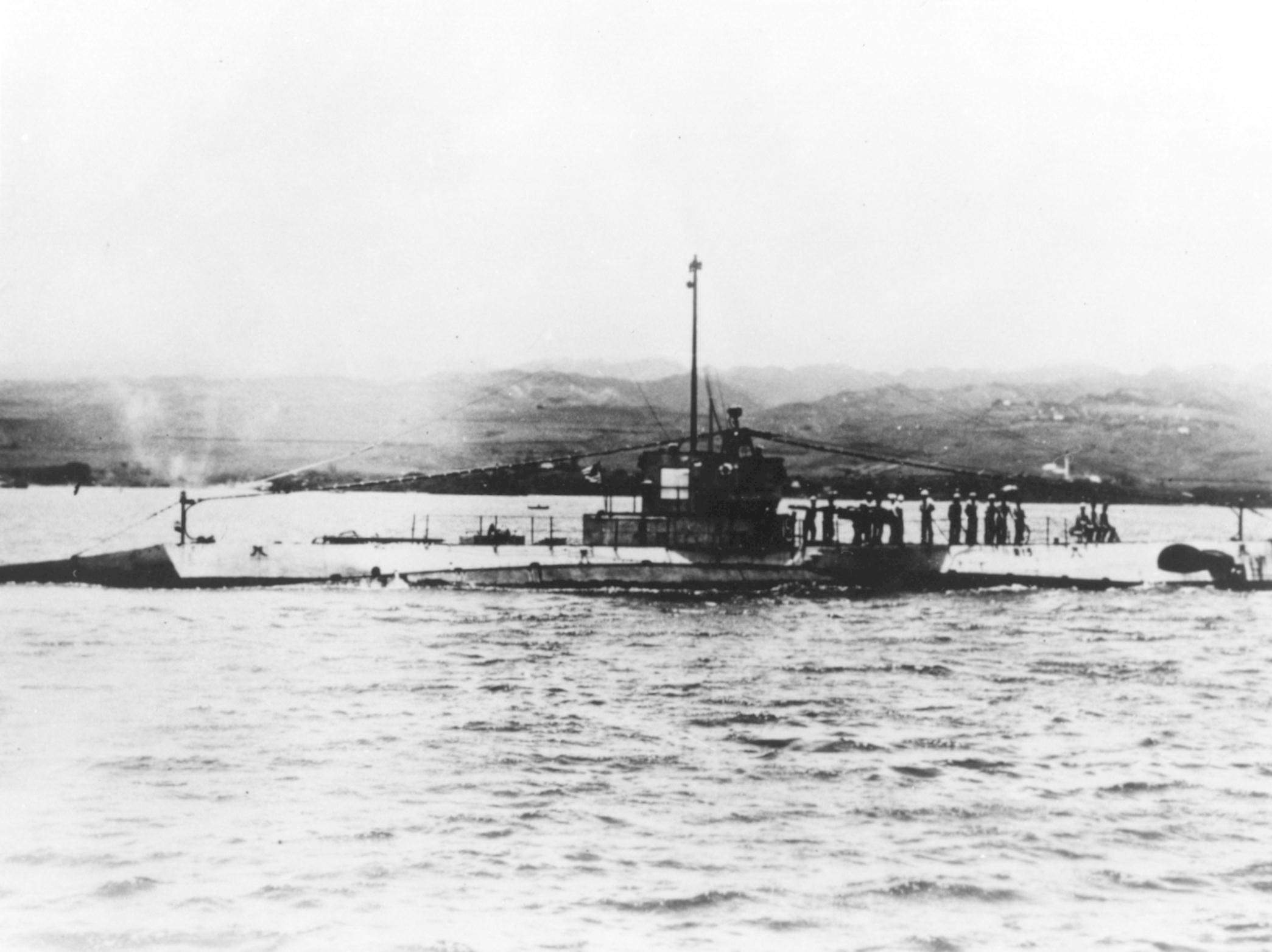
- The crew of USS R-15 (SS-92) air out on deck in a warm climate, note the large white square painted on the submarine's fairwater for recognition

History

United States
- Name: R-15
- Ordered: 29 August 1916
- Builder: Union Iron Works, San Francisco, California
- Cost: $801,906.84 (hull and machinery)
- Laid down: 30 April 1917
- Launched: 10 December 1917
- Sponsored by: Mrs. Lillian Boyd
- Commissioned: 27 July 1918
- Decommissioned: 7 May 1931
- Recommissioned: 1 April 1941
- Decommissioned: 17 September 1945
- Stricken: 11 October 1945
- Identification: Hull symbol: SS-92 (17 July 1920); Call sign: NASV
- Fate: Sold for scrapping, 13 March 1946

General characteristics
- Class & type: R-1-class submarine
- Displacement: 574 long tons (583 t) surfaced; 685 long tons (696 t) submerged
- Length: 186 feet 3 inches (56.77 m)
- Beam: 18 ft (5.5 m)
- Draft: 15 ft 6 in (4.72 m)
- Installed power: 880 brake horsepower (656 kW) diesel; 934 hp (696 kW) electric
- Propulsion: 2 × NELSECO 6-EB-14 diesel engines; 2 × Electro-Dynamic Company electric motors; 2 × 60-cell batteries; 2 × Propellers
- Speed: 12.5 knots (23.2 km/h; 14.4 mph) surfaced; 9.3 kn (17.2 km/h; 10.7 mph) submerged
- Range: 4,700 nautical miles (8,700 km; 5,400 mi) at 6.2 kn (11.5 km/h; 7.1 mph), 7,000 nmi (13,000 km; 8,100 mi) if fuel loaded into the main ballast tanks
- Test depth: 200 ft (61 m)
- Capacity: 18,880 US gallons (71,500 L; 15,720 imp gal) fuel
- Complement: 2 officers; 27 enlisted
- Armament: 4 × 21-inch (533 mm) torpedo tubes (8 torpedoes); 1 × 3-inch (76 mm)/50-caliber deck gun

USS R-15 (SS-92), also known as "Submarine No. 92", was an R-1-class coastal and harbor defense submarines of the United States Navy commissioned before the end of World War I.

== Design ==
The R-boats built by the Fore River Shipbuilding Company, R-1 through R-14, and the Union Iron Works, R-15 through R-20, are sometimes considered a separate class, R-1-class, from those built by the Lake Torpedo Boat Company, R-21 through R-27, R-21-class.

The submarines had a length of 186 feet 3 inches (56.8 m) overall, a beam of 18 ft (5.5 m), and a mean draft of 15 ft 6 in (4.7 m). They displaced 574 long tons (583 t) on the surface and 685 long tons (696 t) submerged. The R-1-class submarines had a crew of 2 officers and 27 enlisted men. They had a diving depth of 200 ft (61.0 m).

For surface running, the boats were powered by two 440-brake-horsepower (328 kW) NELSECO 6-EB-14 diesel engines, each driving one propeller shaft. When submerged each propeller was driven by a 467-horsepower (348 kW) Electro-Dynamic Company electric motor. They could reach 12.5 knots (23.2 km/h; 14.4 mph) on the surface and 9.3 kn (17.2 km/h; 10.7 mph) underwater. On the surface, the R-1-class had a range of 4,700 nautical miles (8,700 km; 5,400 mi) at 6.2 kn (11.5 km/h; 7.1 mph), or 7,000 nmi (13,000 km; 8,100 mi) if fuel was loaded into their main ballast tanks.

The boats were armed with four 21-inch (533 mm) torpedo tubes in the bow. They carried four reloads, for a total of eight torpedoes. The R-1-class submarines were also armed with a single 3 in (76 mm)/50 caliber deck gun.

== Construction ==
R-15's keel was laid down by the Union Iron Works, in San Francisco, California, on 30 April 1917. She was launched on 12 October 1917, sponsored by Mrs. Lillian Boyd, and commissioned on 27 July 1918.

== Service history ==
=== 1918–1931 ===
Following shakedown, R-15 conducted operations in waters adjacent to the Panama Canal Zone. Based at Balboa, through December 1918, she returned to California, in January 1919, where she operated between San Pedro, and San Diego, until March. She then proceeded to Mare Island Naval Shipyard for overhaul prior to her transfer to Pearl Harbor's new submarine base, arriving there on 25 June 1919.

When the US Navy adopted its hull classification system on 17 July 1920, she received the hull number SS-92.

She remained in Hawaiian waters, participating in the development of submarine warfare tactics until 12 December 1930, when she got underway for the East Coast and inactivation.

Decommissioned at the Philadelphia Navy Yard, on 7 May 1931, R-15 remained in the Reserve Fleet until ordered to New London, Connecticut, for activation in the summer of 1940.

=== 1940–1945 ===
Arriving in the Thames River, on 9 September 1940, she was recommissioned 1 April 1941, and in June, sailed south for duty in the Panama Canal Zone. For the next three months she operated with SubRon 3. On 3 October, she got underway for New London, arriving on 23 October, and reporting for duty in SubRon 7.

Patrol duties off the coast followed the entry of the United States into World War II. In February 1942, she again sailed south. In early March, she patrolled in the Virgin Islands area, then shifted to training and patrol duties out of Trinidad. Relieved in early August, R-15 returned to the Virgin Islands, thence continued on to Bermuda, and in the fall, back to New London.

In December, R-15 returned to the Caribbean Sea and operated out of Guantanamo Bay. Further training duties in waters adjacent to the Virgin Islands, and off Bermuda, followed, and in April 1944, she returned to New London. Following ten months of operating out of New London, R-15 returned to the Bermuda area, on 14 December. For the remainder of the war she operated off the Florida coast, and from 1 March to 17 June 1945, from Guantanamo Bay. On 2 September, she put into Key West, to complete her last tour.

== Fate ==
R-15 was decommissioned 17 September 1945, struck from the Naval Vessel Register on 11 October 1945, and sold the same month to Macey O. Scott, of Miami.

== Bibliography ==
- "Table 21 - Ships on Navy List June 30, 1919". Congressional Serial Set. U.S. Government Printing Office: 770. 1921.
- Friedman, Norman (1995). U.S. Submarines Through 1945: An Illustrated Design History. Annapolis, Maryland: Naval Institute Press. ISBN 1-55750-263-3.
- Priolo, Gary. "R-15 (SS-92)". Navsource.net.
- Gardiner, Robert & Gray, Randal (1985). Conway's All the World's Fighting Ships 1906–1921. Annapolis, Maryland: Naval Institute Press. ISBN 0-85177-245-5.
- "R-15". Dictionary of American Naval Fighting Ships. Navy Department, Naval History and Heritage Command. This article incorporates text from this source, which is in the public domain.
- Hall, Anne Martin (1925). Ships of the United States navy and their sponsors, 1913-1923.
