= Electro-Dynamic Company =

- Industry: Electrical machinery
- Founded: 1880
- Founder: William Woodnut Griscom
- Fate: Dissolved 2000
- Headquarters: Philadelphia; Avenel, New Jersey
- Key people: William Woodnut Griscom; Isaac Rice
- Products: Electric motors and electric generators

The Electro-Dynamic Company manufactured electric motors and generators 1880–2000, principally as a subsidiary of the Electric Boat Division of General Dynamics and its predecessors.

== History ==
The company was founded by electrical inventor William Woodnut Griscom in 1880. An important early customer for electric boat motors was the Electric Launch Company, also known as Elco. Following an 1892 bankruptcy, financier Isaac Rice bailed out Electro-Dynamic and became a co-owner. Griscom died in a hunting accident in 1897. Electro-Dynamic manufactured the main propulsion motor for USS Holland, the United States Navy's first modern submarine, launched in 1897. In 1899, Rice founded Electric Boat and made Electro-Dynamic and Elco subsidiaries of it. Electro-Dynamic relocated from Philadelphia to Bayonne, New Jersey at some point prior to 1964, with a plant on Avenue A. In 1964 a fire destroyed this plant and the company acquired a facility in Avenel, New Jersey, formerly occupied by Security Steel. In the 20th century the company manufactured electric motors and generators for numerous submarines built by Electric Boat as well as naval and civilian boats built by Elco. The company retained this function as a division of General Dynamics Corporation when that company was formed by a reorganization of Electric Boat in 1952. The company was dissolved in 2000 and its functions were relocated to Electric Boat's main facility in Groton, Connecticut.

== See also ==
- Electric Launch Company sister company
- New London Ship and Engine Company sister company to
- Submarine Boat Company sister company
