= List of shipwrecks in June 1945 =

The list of shipwrecks in June 1945 includes ships sunk, foundered, grounded, or otherwise lost during June 1945.

== 1 June ==
List of shipwrecks: 1 June 1945
Ship	State	Description
SS-21	Imperial Japanese Navy	World War II: The SS-class landing ship was sunk at Osaka by US aircraft. Raised and repaired post war and put in commercial service.
Tobi Maru	Japan	World War II: The cargo ship (983 GRT, 1929) was torpedoed and sunk in the Java Sea off Matasiri Island (04°53′S 115°48′E) by HMS Tiptoe (Royal Navy) with a loss of three crewmen.

== 2 June ==
List of shipwrecks: 2 June 1945
Ship	State	Description
Koijin Maru	Japan	The ship was lost at Rabaul, New Guinea.
Mikamisan Maru	Japan	World War II: The coaster was torpedoed and sunk in the Pacific Ocean off Hokkaido by USS Tench (United States Navy) with the loss of 24 lives.
R-85	Kriegsmarine	The Type R-41 minesweeper was sunk in a collision at Altenbruch.

== 3 June ==
List of shipwrecks: 3 June 1945
Ship	State	Description
U-1277	Kriegsmarine	End of World War II: The Type VIIC/41 submarine was scuttled off Porto, Portugal (41°09′N 8°41′W). All 47 crew survived.

== 4 June ==
List of shipwrecks: 4 June 1945
Ship	State	Description
CHa-112	Imperial Japanese Navy	World War II: The auxiliary submarine chaser, a former A-class minesweeper, was bombed and sunk in the Java Sea off Laut Island (05°00′S 116°04′E) by Consolidated B-24 Liberator aircraft of the United States Thirteenth Air Force.
Colin P. Kelly, Jr.	United States	World War II: The Liberty ship struck a mine in the North Sea and was damaged. She was declared a total loss.
Herta Engeline Fritzen	Germany	World War II: The cargo ship struck a mine and sank off Brunsbüttel, Schleswig-Holstein. Wreck scrapped in Boom, Belgium from August 1949.
Ryujin Maru	Japan	World War II: The cargo ship was torpedoed and sunk in the Pacific Ocean off Hokkaido by USS Tench (United States Navy).
Taiu Maru	Japan	World War II: The cargo ship was torpedoed and sunk in the East China Sea by USS Billfish (United States Navy).

== 5 June ==
List of shipwrecks: 5 June 1945
Ship	State	Description
CHa-230	Imperial Japanese Navy	The CHa-1-class auxiliary submarine chaser was sunk south of Korea in a collision with Azusa Maru (Imperial Japanese Army).
Sperrbrecher 23	Kriegsmarine	The surrendered Sperrbrecher sank on this date.

== 6 June ==
List of shipwrecks: 6 June 1945
Ship	State	Description
CHa-195	Imperial Japanese Navy	World War II: The CHa-1-class auxiliary submarine chaser was sunk south of Honshu by mines. Raised and was under repair at the end of the war.
Empire Harry	United Kingdom	The Larch-class tug (487 GRT, 1943) ran aground at Beacon Point, Devon whilst towing United States Army barges from Falmouth, Cornwall to Antwerp, Belgium. She broke up, and was declared a total loss.
Gilliak	United States	The ship was scuttled at position 'Nan South' at Iwo Jima as a breakwater for the Iwo Jima harbor project.
Gotenhafen	Allied-occupied Germany	The cargo ship sank at Hamburg. She was refloated on 28 January 1951 and was subsequently scrapped.
USS Sheepscot	United States Navy	The Mettawee-class gasoline tanker ran aground and capsized off Iwo Jima, Japan. She was a total loss.

== 7 June ==
List of shipwrecks: 7 June 1945
Ship	State	Description
Azusan Maru	Japan	World War II: The cargo ship was torpedoed and sunk in the Yellow Sea or East China Sea by USS Shad (United States Navy).
Hanshin Maru	Imperial Japanese Navy	World War II: The guard boat was torpedoed and sunk in the Pacific Ocean off Hokkaido by USS Tench (United States Navy).
Hino Maru No. 43 Go	Imperial Japanese Navy	World War II: The auxiliary submarine chaser was sunk by aircraft off Hiradojima, Miyanoura.
Nuwashima	Imperial Japanese Navy	World War II: The Sokuten-class minelayer was heavily damaged by American aircraft with the stern breaking off and sinking off Kyushu. The ship was beached and later broken up.
Yubari Maru No. 2	Japan	World War II: The cargo ship was sunk by a mine at the mouth of the Kammon Strait.

== 8 June ==
List of shipwrecks: 8 June 1945
Ship	State	Description
Ashigara	Imperial Japanese Navy	World War II: The Myōkō-class cruiser was torpedoed and sunk in the Bangka Strait (01°59′S 104°56′E) by the submarine HMS Trenchant (Royal Navy) with the loss of about 1,300 lives. Rear Admiral Miura, 850 crew and 400 Imperial Japanese Army troops were rescued by Kamikaze (Imperial Japanese Navy).
Hakusa	Imperial Japanese Navy	World War II: The repair ship was torpedoed and sunk in the Gulf of Siam off Cape Camau, French Indochina (08°56′N 105°37′E) by USS Cobia (United States Navy). Her captain was killed along with an unknown number of others.
USS Salute	United States Navy	World War II: The Admirable-class minesweeper struck a mine and sank in Brunei Bay (5°08′N 115°05′E).
Unknown ship	Japan	World War II: The ship, originally misidentified as the tanker Nanshin Maru No. 22, was torpedoed and sunk in the Gulf of Siam off Cape Camau, French Indochina (08°56′N 105°37′E) by USS Cobia (United States Navy).

== 9 June ==
List of shipwrecks: 9 June 1945
Ship	State	Description
CD-41	Imperial Japanese Navy	World War II: The Type C escort ship was torpedoed and sunk in the Tsushima Strait (34°18′N 127°18′E) by USS Sea Owl (United States Navy). The torpedo exploded her magazine killing all 173 hands.
USS Concrete No. 8	United States Navy	The 366 foot B7-A1 class concrete hulled oil barge was scuttled at position 'Jig West' at Iwo Jima as a breakwater for the Iwo Jima harbor project.
Hokuto Maru	Japan	World War II: The cargo ship was torpedoed and sunk in the Inland Sea of Japan by USS Crevalle (United States Navy).
Sagawa Maru	Japan	World War II: The cargo ship was torpedoed and sunk in the Inland Sea of Japan by USS Sea Dog (United States Navy).
Shinroku Maru	Japan	World War II: The cargo ship was torpedoed and sunk in the Pacific Ocean off Hokkaido by USS Tench (United States Navy).
Shoyo Maru	Japan	World War II: The cargo ship was torpedoed and sunk in the Inland Sea of Japan by USS Sea Dog (United States Navy).
Tassie III	United States	The steel motor vessel was wrecked at 28.638795°S 153.613906°E while sheltering at a jetty at Byron Bay, New South Wales, Australia. The salvage tug Tancred (Australia) salvaged most of her cargo of ammunition from her wreck in 1946.
Wakatama Maru	Japan	World War II: The cargo ship was torpedoed and sunk in the Inland Sea of Japan by USS Tinosa (United States Navy).

== 10 June ==
List of shipwrecks: 10 June 1945
Ship	State	Description
Ayuruoca	Brazil	The cargo ship collided with General Fleischer (Norway) and sank in the Atlantic Ocean off New York, United States (40°12′30″N 73°46′30″W).
CHa-63	Imperial Japanese Navy	The CHa-1-class auxiliary submarine chaser was sunk west of Mokpo, Korea (34°50′N 126°10′E) in a collision.
Daigen Maru No. 2	Japan	World War II: The cargo ship was torpedoed and sunk in the Inland Sea of Japan by USS Spadefish (United States Navy)
Daiki Maru	Japan	World War II: The cargo ship was torpedoed and sunk in the Inland Sea of Japan by USS Crevalle (United States Navy).
Hakuyo Maru	Japan	World War II: The cargo ship was torpedoed and sunk off the Kuril Islands by USS Dace (United States Navy).
I-122	Imperial Japanese Navy	World War II: The submarine was torpedoed and sunk in the Inland Sea of Japan (37°29′N 137°25′E) by USS Skate (United States Navy).
Jinzu Maru	Japan	World War II: The coaster was torpedoed and sunk in the Inland Sea of Japan by USS Spadefish (United States Navy).
Kusunoki Maru No. 2	Imperial Japanese Navy	World War II: The guard boat was sunk off the Kuril Islands by USS Dace (United States Navy).
Shoei Maru No. 6	Japan	World War II: The tanker was torpedoed and sunk in the Pacific Ocean of Hokkaido by USS Tench (United States Navy).
Tado Maru	Japan	World War II: The tanker was bombed and sunk off the west coast of Korea (36°00′N 125°00′E) by U.S. Navy PB4Y aircraft.
Taga Maru	Japan	World War II: The cargo ship was torpedoed and sunk near Gyeongseong Bay, Korea (41°40′N 129°52′E) by USS Flying Fish (United States Navy). Three crew members were killed.
Unkai Maru No. 8	Japan	World War II: The cargo ship was torpedoed and sunk in the Inland Sea of Japan by USS Spadefish (United States Navy).
USS William D. Porter	United States Navy	USS William D. Porter sinking World War II: The Fletcher-class destroyer was sunk by a Japanese kamikaze attack using an Aichi D3A aircraft. All 273 crew were rescued by USS LCS(L)(3)-86 and USS LCS(L)(3)-122 (both United States Navy).

== 11 June ==
List of shipwrecks: 11 June 1945
Ship	State	Description
CHa-237	Imperial Japanese Navy	World War II: The CHa-1-class auxiliary submarine chaser was sunk off Irakosaki by American aircraft.
Fukui Maru No. 2	Japan	World War II: The cargo ship was torpedoed and sunk in the East China Sea by USS Segundo (United States Navy).
Hakuju Maru	Japan	World War II: The cargo ship was torpedoed and sunk in the Pacific Ocean west of Kyushu by USS Tirante (United States Navy).
Hakusan Maru No. 5	Imperial Japanese Navy	World War II: The auxiliary gunboat was torpedoed and sunk in the Inland Sea of Japan by USS Crevalle (United States Navy).
Kofuku Maru	Japan	World War II: The coaster was torpedoed and sunk in the Inland Sea of Japan by USS Sea Dog (United States Navy).
Meisei Maru	Imperial Japanese Army	World War II: The Meisei Maru-class auxiliary transport ship was torpedoed and sunk in the South China Sea 100 nautical miles (190 km) off Chungjin, Korea (41°47′N 131°44′E) by USS Flying Fish (United States Navy) with the loss of 42 lives. Flying Fish took one survivor as a prisoner of war.
Shinyō Maru No. 3	Japan	World War II: The cargo ship was torpedoed and sunk in the Inland Sea of Japan by USS Bowfin (United States Navy).
Toyo Maru No. 3	Imperial Japanese Navy	World War II: The Toyo Maru No. 3-class cargo ship ran aground off Saei. She was bombed the next day and abandoned. Four crew were killed. Two Daihatsu landing barges were salvaged the next day. The wreck was bombed and set afire on 18 June.

== 12 June ==
List of shipwrecks: 12 June 1945
Ship	State	Description
Aizan Maru	Imperial Japanese Army	World War II: The Type 2D Wartime Standard cargo ship was sunk off Nagasaki in Hakata Bay (33°38′N 130°22′E) by an air dropped mine. Raised and repaired post war.
CH-57	Imperial Japanese Navy	World War II: Operation Irregular: The No.13-class submarine chaser was shelled and sunk in the Andaman Sea (06°20′N 94°45′E) by HMS Eskimo, HMS Nubian, and HMS Tartar (all Royal Navy).
Daido Maru	Imperial Japanese Navy	World War II: The guard boat was torpedoed and sunk in the Inland Sea of Japan by USS Spadefish (United States Navy).
Hakuyo Maru	Japan	The cargo ship was lost in a maritime incident in dense fog in the Tsugaru Strait.
Keito Maru	Japan	World War II: The cargo ship was shelled and sunk in the Tsushima Strait by USS Tinosa (United States Navy).
Kenjo Maru	Japan	World War II: The cargo ship was torpedoed and sunk in the Inland Sea of Japan off Kanazawa, Honshu (37°08′N 136°43′E) by USS Skate (United States Navy).
Kuroshio Maru No. 2	Imperial Japanese Navy	World War II: Operation Irregular: The communications ship, a converted T-101-class landing ship, was torpedoed and sunk in the Andaman Sea (06°20′N 94°45′E) by HMS Eskimo (Royal Navy).
Shinsen Maru	Japan	World War II: The cargo ship was torpedoed and sunk in the Inland Sea of Japan by USS Sea Dog (United States Navy).
T-357	Soviet Navy	World War II: The Project T 351L Type MT-1 minesweeper was sunk in the Danzig Bight by mines.
Yozan Maru	Japan	World War II: The cargo ship was torpedoed and sunk in the Inland Sea of Japan by USS Skate (United States Navy).
Zuiko Maru	Japan	World War II: The cargo ship was torpedoed and sunk in the Inland Sea of Japan by USS Skate (United States Navy).

== 13 June ==
List of shipwrecks: 13 June 1945
Ship	State	Description
Akiura Maru	Japan	World War II: The coaster was torpedoed and sunk in the Inland Sea of Japan by USS Bowfin (United States Navy).
USS Concrete No. 30	United States Navy	The 366 foot B7-A1 class concrete hulled oil barge was scuttled at position 'Love South' as the final piece of a breakwater/artificial port at Iwo Jima. Wreck raised above water by volcanic land lift in the 21st century.
Koryu Maru	Imperial Japanese Navy	World War II: The Koryu Maru-class Type 1TS coastal tanker was mined and sunk in the Shimonoseki Strait (33°55′N 131°07′E) off the Hesaki Lighthouse. Fourteen crewmen were killed.
Oshikasan Maru	Japan	World War II: The cargo ship was torpedoed and sunk in the Inland Sea of Japan by USS Bonefish (United States Navy) with the loss of 30 lives.
Sanjin Maru	Japan	World War II: The cargo ship was torpedoed and sunk in the Inland Sea of Japan by USS Skate (United States Navy.
Transbalt	Soviet Union	World War II: The cargo liner was torpedoed and sunk in the west end of La Perouse Strait by USS Skate or USS Spadefish (both United States Navy). Five of her 104 crew were killed.

== 14 June ==
List of shipwrecks: 14 June 1945
Ship	State	Description
Donau	Germany	The former Kriegsmarine ammunition ship sank after an explosion in Flensburgfjord. The explosion heavily damaged former Kriegsmarine (captured Danish) Glenten-class torpedo boats TFA 1, TFA 2, TFA 4, TFA 5 and TFA 6 (all Kriegsmarine). They were not repaired.
Seizan Maru	Japan	World War II: The cargo ship was torpedoed and sunk in the Inland Sea of Japan by USS Spadefish (United States Navy).
Wakamiyasan Maru	Imperial Japanese Navy	World War II: The transport was torpedoed and sunk in the Yellow Sea (37°35′N 123°30′E) by USS Sea Devil (United States Navy).

== 15 June ==
List of shipwrecks: 15 June 1945
Ship	State	Description
Koan Maru	Japan	World War II: The coaster was torpedoed and sunk in the Inland Sea of Japan by USS Sea Dog (United States Navy).

== 16 June ==
List of shipwrecks: 16 June 1945
Ship	State	Description
Air raid warning hulk	Imperial Japanese Navy	World War II: The former Dutch submarine K XVIII was sunk in the Madura Strait, Dutch East Indies, by HMS Taciturn (Royal Navy).
CHa-105	Imperial Japanese Navy	World War II: The auxiliary submarine chaser was torpedoed and sunk in the Java Sea by HMS Taciturn (Royal Navy).
Eiso Maru	United States Navy	World War II: The cargo ship was torpedoed and sunk in the Pacific Ocean by USS Piranha (United States Navy).
USS Twiggs	United States Navy	World War II: Battle of Okinawa: The Fletcher-class destroyer was sunk in the Pacific Ocean off Okinawa, Japan by a kamikaze aircraft attack with the loss of 152 of her 340 crew.

== 17 June ==
List of shipwrecks: 17 June 1945
Ship	State	Description
Eijo	Imperial Japanese Navy	World War II: The minelayer (a.k.a. Eijo Maru) was torpedoed and sunk in the Inland Sea of Japan off Motsutanozaki, Hokkaido, north east of Cape Motta (42°43′N 139°57′E) by USS Spadefish (United States Navy). There were no casualties.
R-112	Kriegsmarine	World War II: The Type R-41 minesweeper was sunk by an explosion at Dordrect.
Wa-101	Imperial Japanese Navy	World War II: The Wa-101-class auxiliary minesweeper was sunk at Surabaya, Netherlands East Indies by American carrier-based aircraft. Raised and repaired post-war, and put in Dutch, and later Indonesian, service.

== 18 June ==
List of shipwrecks: 18 June 1945
Ship	State	Description
Bizan Maru	Japan	World War II: The cargo ship struck a mine and sank in the South China Sea (33°58′N 130°44′E). She was refloated in 1948, repaired and returned to service.
CHa-197	Imperial Japanese Navy	World War II: The CHa-1-class auxiliary submarine chaser was sunk off the Mojisaki Lighthouse by mines.
Hakuai Maru	Japan	World War II: The cargo ship (a.k.a. Hiroi Maru) was torpedoed and sunk in the Sea of Okhotsk by USS Apogon (United States Navy). Thirty-nine passengers were killed. Survivors were rescued by CH-15 (Imperial Japanese Navy).
Heiwa Maru	Imperial Japanese Navy	World War II: The patrol boat was sunk in the East China Sea by USS Dentuda (United States Navy).
Reiko Maru	Imperial Japanese Navy	World War II: The patrol boat was sunk in the East China Sea by USS Dentuda (United States Navy).
Wakae Maru	Japan	World War II: The cargo ship was torpedoed and sunk in the Inland Sea of Japan by USS Tinosa (United States Navy).
USS YMS-50	United States Navy	World War II: Battle of Balikpapan: The auxiliary minesweeper struck a mine and was damaged off Balikpapan, Borneo (1°18′S 116°49′E). She was scuttled by USS Denver; Twenty-three survivors were rescued by USS Cofer (both United States Navy).
Zaosan Maru	Japan	World War II: The cargo ship was torpedoed and sunk in the Sea of Okhotsk by USS Apogon and USS Dace (both United States Navy). Seven passengers and 49 crewmen were killed. Survivors were rescued by CH-15 (Imperial Japanese Navy).

== 19 June ==
List of shipwrecks: 19 June 1945
Ship	State	Description
USS Bonefish	United States Navy	World War II: The Gato-class submarine was sunk by CD-63, CD-158, CD-207 and Okinawa (all Imperial Japanese Navy) at Toyama Wan, Honshū (37°18′N 137°55′E) with the loss of all 60 crew.
Konzan Maru	Japan	World War II: The cargo ship was torpedoed and sunk at Toyama Wan, Honshū, Japan (37°13′N 137°18′E) by USS Bonefish (United States Navy). A crewman was killed.

== 20 June ==
List of shipwrecks: 20 June 1945
Ship	State	Description
Cyrene	Sweden	World War II: The fishing boat was sunk by a mine in the Skagerrak west of Hanstholm with the loss of all six crew.
Kaisei Maru	Japan	World War II: The coaster was torpedoed and sunk in the Inland Sea of Japan by USS Tinosa (United States Navy).
Taito Maru	Japan	World War II: The cargo ship was torpedoed and sunk in the Inland Sea of Japan by USS Tinosa (United States Navy).

== 21 June ==
List of shipwrecks: 21 June 1945
Ship	State	Description
USS Barry	United States Navy	World War II: The high-speed transport, a former Clemson-class destroyer, was sunk in the Pacific Ocean off Okinawa, Japan by a kamikaze aircraft attack while acting as a kamikaze decoy after being heavily damaged on 25 May.
HMS Hildasay	Royal Navy	World War II: The Isles-class trawler (545/770 t, 1941) was wrecked near Kilindili.
Hizen Maru	Japan	World War II: The cargo ship was torpedoed and sunk in the Pacific Ocean by USS Parche (United States Navy).
Kokai Maru	Japan	World War II: The cargo ship was torpedoed and sunk in the Inland Sea of Japan by USS Sea Dog (United States Navy).
USS LSM-59	United States Navy	World War II: The LSM-1-class landing ship medium was sunk in the Pacific Ocean off Okinawa by a kamikaze aircraft attack. Thirty-eight survivors were rescued by USS Steady (United States Navy).
Millen Griffiths	United States	The Liberty ship ran aground in a storm off the north coast of New Guinea just north of Finschafen and sprung a leak. 1,000 Australian troops on board were taken off by FS-150 and FS-176 (both United States Army) and taken to Finschafen. Later pulled of and returned to service.
Shinei Maru No. 3	Japan	World War II: The coaster was torpedoed and sunk in the Inland Sea of Japan by USS Sea Dog (United States Navy).

== 22 June ==
List of shipwrecks: 22 June 1945
Ship	State	Description
I-204	Japan	World War II: The incomplete I-201-class submarine, only 90% complete, was bombed and sunk at Kure by Boeing B-29 Superfortress aircraft. Raised post-war and scrapped.
I-352	Japan	World War II: The incomplete I-351-class submarine, only 90% complete, was bombed and sunk at Kure by Boeing B-29 Superfortress aircraft. Raised post-war and scrapped.
Pierre Gibault	United States	World War II: The Liberty ship struck a mine and was damaged in the Aegean Sea off Rhodes, Greece (36°08′N 29°30′E). She was beached but declared a constructive total loss.
Sonora	United States	The ship caught fire and sank off the west coast of Florida.

== 23 June ==
List of shipwrecks: 23 June 1945
Ship	State	Description
Antung Maru No. 293	Japan	World War II: The junk was sunk in the Pacific Ocean west of Kyushu by USS Tirante (United States Navy).
Cha-42	Imperial Japanese Navy	World War II: The auxiliary submarine chaser was torpedoed and sunk in the Java Sea by USS Hardhead (United States Navy).
Cha-113	Imperial Japanese Navy	World War II: The auxiliary submarine chaser, the former Dutch A-class minesweeper HNLMS A, was torpedoed and sunk in the Java Sea (05°45′S 114°16′E) by USS Hardhead (United States Navy).

== 24 June ==
List of shipwrecks: 24 June 1945
Ship	State	Description
Antung Maru No. 284	Japan	World War II: The junk was sunk in the Pacific Ocean west of Kyushu by USS Tirante (United States Navy).
Plutogo	Italy	World War II: The cargo ship was bombed and sunk off Chemulpo, Korea (34°47′N 126°25′E)}.

== 25 June ==
List of shipwrecks: 25 June 1945
Ship	State	Description
HMS MMS 168	Royal Navy	World War II: The MMS-class minesweeper (255/295 t, 1942) was sunk by a mine off Genoa, Italy.
Wa-105	Imperial Japanese Navy	World War II: The Wa-101-class auxiliary minesweeper was sunk off Java, Netherlands East Indies by HMS Trenchant (Royal Navy).

== 26 June ==
List of shipwrecks: 26 June 1945
Ship	State	Description
CHa-73, CHa-206 and CHa-209	Imperial Japanese Navy	World War II: The CHa-1-class auxiliary submarine chasers were sunk off the Kuril Islands by USS Bearss, USS Jarvis, and USS John Hood (all United States Navy).
Eikan Maru	Japan	World War II: Convoy No. 1624: The Standard Type 2A cargo ship was torpedoed and damaged in the Pacific Ocean south of Todogasaki, Honshu (39°25′N 142°04′E) by USS Parche (United States Navy). She was beached on Iwate Ken to prevent sinking, later broke in two. The wreck was abandoned later after being bombed by American carrier-based aircraft. A crewman was killed.
Enoki	Imperial Japanese Navy	World War II: The Matsu-class destroyer was sunk by a mine in Obama Bay (35°28′N 135°44′E) in shallow water. Scrapped post-war.
Kamitsu Maru	Imperial Japanese Navy	World War II: Convoy No. 1624: The Kamitsu Maru-class auxiliary transport was torpedoed and sunk in the Pacific Ocean south of Todogasaki, Honshu (39°25′N 142°04′E) by USS Parche (United States Navy). One hundred and ninety-two crewmen were killed.
Kusunoki Maru	Imperial Japanese Navy	World War II: The guard ship was sunk off the Kuril Islands by USS Bearss, USS Jarvis, and USS John Hood (all United States Navy).
USS YMS-39	United States Navy	World War II: Battle of Balikpapan: The YMS-1-class minesweeper struck a mine and sank off Balikpapan, Borneo (1°18′S 116°49′E).
USS YMS-365	United States Navy	World War II: Battle of Balikpapan: The YMS-1-class minesweeper struck a mine and was damaged off Balikpapan, Borneo (1°18′S 116°50′E) and was scuttled.

== 27 June ==
List of shipwrecks: 27 June 1945
Ship	State	Description
CH-2	Imperial Japanese Navy	World War II: The No.1-class submarine chaser was torpedoed and sunk in the Bali Sea near Lombok Island, Netherlands East Indies (07°30′S 116°15′E) by USS Blueback (United States Navy).
Hazo Maru	Japan	World War II: The cargo ship was sunk in an air attack at Rabaul, New Guinea.
I-165	Imperial Japanese Navy	World War II: The Kaidai type submarine was bombed and sunk in the Pacific Ocean 480 nautical miles (890 km; 550 mi) east of Saipan, Northern Mariana Islands (15°28′N 153°39′E) by a United States Navy Lockheed PV-2 Harpoon aircraft.
Kyushu Maru	Imperial Japanese Navy	World War II: The Kyushu Maru-class auxiliary transport ship was bombed and sunk by Consolidated B-24 Liberator aircraft four nautical miles (7.4 km; 4.6 mi) north east of Otsu, Ibaraki Prefecture, Honshu. Fifteen crewmen and eight gunners are killed.

== 28 June ==
List of shipwrecks: 28 June 1945
Ship	State	Description
Osei Maru	Imperial Japanese Navy	World War II: The salvage ship struck a mine and was beached at Jizo saki. Refloated and scrapped, probably post war.

== 30 June ==
List of shipwrecks: 30 June 1945
Ship	State	Description
Bando Maru	Japan	World War II: The cargo ship was torpedoed and sunk in the Java Sea north of Bali, Netherlands East Indies (06°27′S 117°13′E) by USS Baya or USS Capitaine (both United States Navy).
Harusei Maru	Japan	The cargo ship was sunk in Maizuru Bay. She was refloated post-war, restored to her Dutch owners and returned to service as Van der Hagen.
Taruyasu Maru	Imperial Japanese Navy	World War II: The cargo ship was mined and sunk off Sado Island. Raised, repaired and put in British service as Empire Evenlode (United Kingdom).

== Unknown date ==
List of shipwrecks: Unknown date 1945
Ship	State	Description
Caliche	Soviet Union	World War II: The vessel was scuttled by the U.S. as a piece of a breakwater/artificial port at Iwo Jima before 13 June. Wreck raised above water by volcanic land lift in the 21st century.
Chetverti Krabalov	Soviet Union	World War II: The vessel was scuttled by the U.S. as a piece of a breakwater/artificial port at Iwo Jima before 13 June. Wreck raised above water by volcanic land lift in the 21st century.
Gilyak	Soviet Union	World War II: The vessel was scuttled by the U.S. as a piece of a breakwater/artificial port at Iwo Jima before 13 June. Wreck raised above water by volcanic land lift in the 21st century.
USS YC-1272	United States Navy	The open lighter, beached on the south side of the Cerritos Channel at San Pedro, California, was lost sometime in June.
