= Hakuyo Maru =

Hakuyo Maru may refer to the following ships:

- Japanese survey ship Hakuyo Maru, World War II-era Japanese survey ship
- Japanese submarine chaser Hakuyo Maru, World War II-era Japanese submarine chaser
- Japanese cargo ship Hakuyo Maru (1942), World War II-era Japanese cargo ship
- Japanese cargo ship Hakuyo Maru (1944), World War II-era Japanese cargo ship
- Japanese transport ship Hakuyo Maru (1942), World War II-era Japanese transport ship
