= HMAS Sprightly =

Tugboat of the Royal Australian Navy

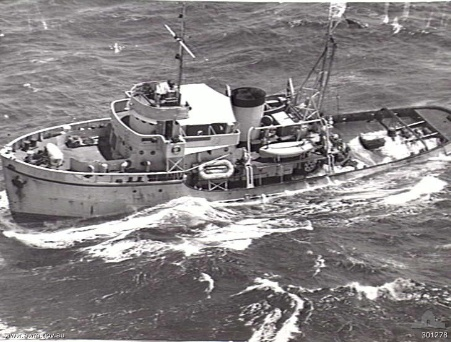
- Sister ship HMAS Reserve in 1951

History

Australia
- Builder: Levingston Shipbuilding Company, Orange, Texas
- Laid down: 1942
- Launched: 7 August 1942.
- Acquired: 1942 (Commonwealth Marine Salvage Board); 1943 (RAN)
- Commissioned: 23 February 1944
- Decommissioned: 31 March 1958
- Identification: IMO number: 7021704
- Fate: Sold in 1969

General characteristics
- Displacement: 800 tons
- Length: 143 ft (44 m)
- Beam: 33 ft 1 in (10.08 m)
- Draught: 14 ft 7 in (4.45 m)
- Speed: 16 knots (30 km/h; 18 mph)
- Armament: 1 × 3 inch HA/LA gun, 2 × Oerlikon 20 mm cannon, 2 × M2 Browning machine gun
- Notes: Ship characteristics from

HMAS Sprightly was a tugboat operated by the Royal Australian Navy (RAN) between 1943 and 1953.

== Construction ==
She was built by the Levingston Shipbuilding Company, Orange, Texas during 1942.

== Operational history ==
Sprightly was acquired by the Commonwealth Marine Salvage Board in 1942. She was commissioned into the RAN in 1943.

== Decommissioning and fate ==
Sprightly was paid off on 31 March 1958 and was finally sold on 29 August 1969 to T. Korevaar and Sons Pty Ltd, Williamstown, Victoria.

In May 1990 the Sprightly was impounded by the authorities in Loyang OffShore supply Base Singapore for carrying a large amount of firearms and ammunition.
