= Vernon L. Lowrance =

American Navy submarine commander and admiral

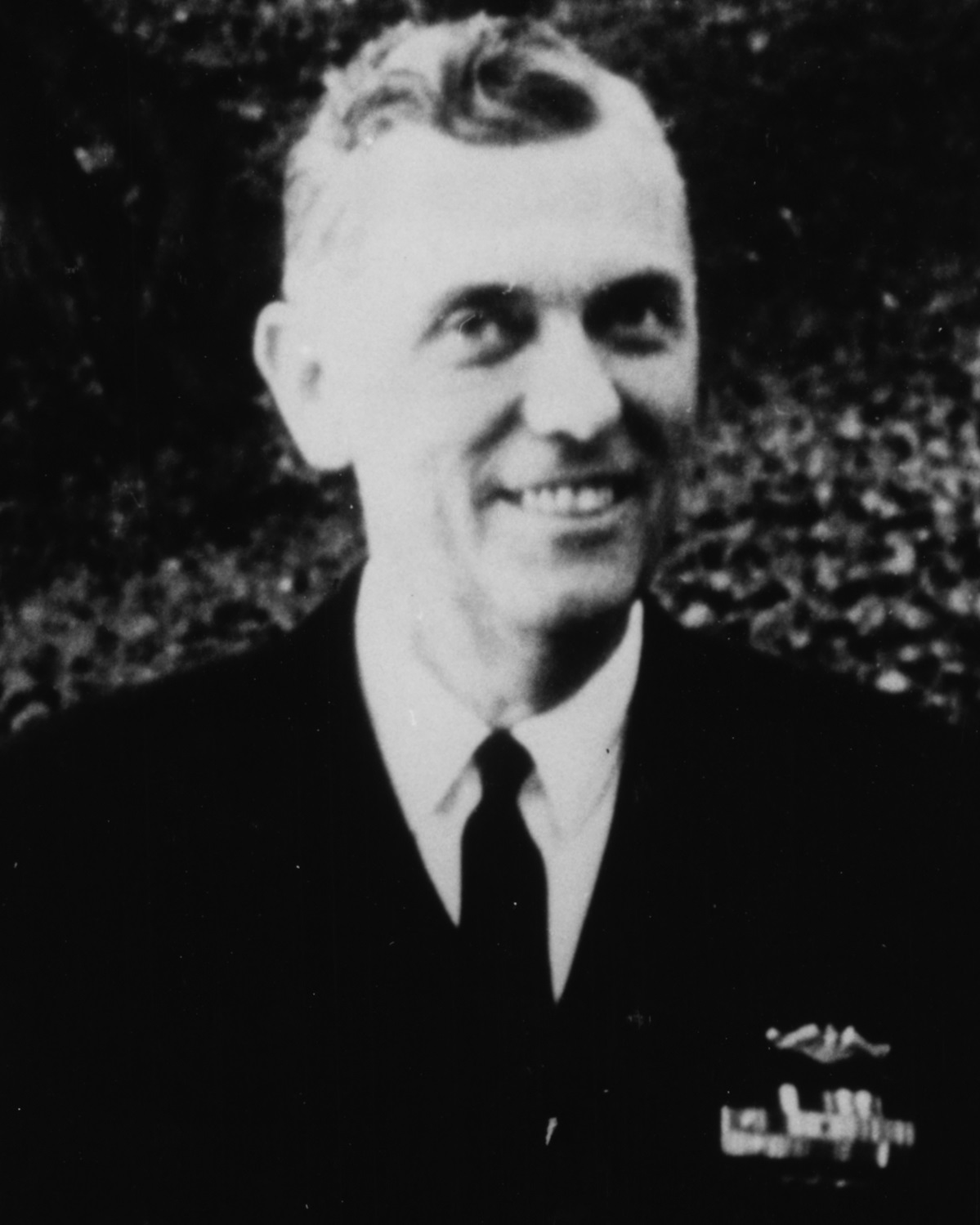
- Born: April 19, 1909; Catawba, North Carolina, U.S.
- Died: May 12, 1995 (aged 86); Coronado, California, U.S.
- Military career
- Allegiance: United States
- Branch: United States Navy
- Service years: 1930–1969
- Rank: Vice Admiral
- Nickname: Rebel
- Commands: Submarine Force Atlantic; Office of Naval Intelligence; USS Macon; Submarine Squadron Eight; Submarine Division 121; USS Sea Dog; USS Kingfish; USS R-16
- Conflicts: World War II
- Awards: Navy Cross; Distinguished Service Medal (2); Silver Star (3)

Vernon Long "Rebel" Lowrance (April 19, 1909 – May 12, 1995) was a United States Navy officer who served as a submarine commander during World War II and later became director of the Office of Naval Intelligence. Promoted to vice admiral, he commanded Submarine Force Atlantic and then served as deputy director of the Defense Intelligence Agency.

== Early life and education ==
Lowrance was born and raised in Catawba, North Carolina. He was appointed to the United States Naval Academy in 1926, graduating in 1930.

== Military career ==
At the outbreak of World War II, Lowrance was in command of the submarine R-16 on the Atlantic Coast. Transferred to the Pacific theatre, he commanded Kingfish and Sea Dog on seven successful combat patrols. Credited with sinking 56,000 tons of Japanese shipping, Lowrance was awarded the Navy Cross and three Silver Stars. He was then given command of Submarine Division 121.

After the war, Lowrance commanded Submarine Squadron Eight. Frocked as a captain on November 15, 1945, his promotion became permanent on July 1, 1949. From April 1955 to November 1956, he served as commander of the cruiser Macon. Lowrance also served as interim commander of the attack transport Rockbridge for three weeks in July 1955.

Promoted to rear admiral effective August 1, 1957, Lowrance served as director of the Office of Naval Intelligence from September 1960 to June 1963.

Promoted to vice admiral effective August 31, 1964, Lowrance served as commander of Submarine Force Atlantic from September 1964 to November 1966 and as deputy director of the Defense Intelligence Agency from November 1966 until his retirement in October 1969. He received a Navy Distinguished Service Medal for each of these assignments.

== Personal ==
Lowrance was the youngest of eight children born to Lawson Henry Lowrance (October 10, 1862 – July 18, 1910)and Essie Cline (Long) Lowrance (January 15, 1877 – March 21, 1968). Their eldest child Carlos Uriah Lowrance (January 20, 1895 – November 11, 1985) served in the United States Army during both World War I and World War II, retiring as a major.

Vernon Lowrance died in Coronado, California and was interred at the United States Naval Academy Cemetery along with his wife Claire V. (Dowden) Lowrance (June 21, 1910 – July 13, 1985) and a son who died in infancy. Their other son Douglas Long Lowrance (December 1, 1935 – July 8, 2017) was a 1957 Naval Academy graduate and commander of the submarine Picuda.
