= USS Umpqua =

USS Umpqua has been the name of three ships in the service of the United States Navy. The ship name comes from the Umpqua River in Oregon. The river in turn was named for the Umpqua tribe, a small tribe of Athabascan linguistic stock.

- USS Umpqua (1865), a single-turreted, twin-screw monitor which served in the Union Navy beginning in 1866.
- USS Umpqua (AT-25), a Bagaduce-class tugboat which served from 1919 until 1946.
- USS Umpqua (ATA-209), an auxiliary fleet tug that began service in 1945.
