= USS Sciota (ATA-205) =

Tugboat of the United States Navy

History

United States
- Name: USS Sciota (ATA-205)
- Builder: Gulfport Boiler & Welding Works, Port Arthur, TX
- Laid down: 12 October 1944
- Launched: 26 November 1944
- Commissioned: USS ATR-132, 30 January 1945
- Decommissioned: 1945
- Renamed: Sciota (ATA-205), 16 June 1948
- Reclassified: Auxiliary Fleet Tug (ATA-205),15 May 1944
- Stricken: 1 September 1962
- Fate: Temporary custody to the Maritime Administration (MARAD) for lay up in the National Defense Reserve Fleet, Olympia WA., 9 November 1960; Permanent custody returned to the US Navy, 14 August 1978

General characteristics
- Class & type: Sotoyomo-class auxiliary fleet tug
- Displacement: 534 t.Long tons 835 t. Full load
- Length: 143 ft (44 m)
- Beam: 33 ft (10 m)
- Draft: 13 ft (4.0 m)
- Propulsion: diesel-electric engines, single screw
- Speed: 13 knots (24 km/h; 15 mph)
- Complement: 45
- Armament: 1 × single 3"/50 caliber gun mount; 2 × single 20 mm AA gun mounts

ATR-132 was laid down on 12 October 1944 at the Gulfport Boiler & Welding Works, Port Arthur, Texas; launched on 26 November 1944; and commissioned on 30 January 1945.

In 1945, ATR-132 was redesignated as Ocean tug, auxiliary, ATA-205. She was placed in reserve, out of commission, and assigned to the United States Pacific Reserve Fleet and berthed on the Columbia River in January 1947. ATA-205 was named Sciota on 16 July 1948. In November 1960, Sciota was transferred to the Maritime Administration for custody, but the Navy retained ownership. Sciota's name was struck from the Navy list on 1 September 1962.

== See also ==
- Type V ship
