= USS Kingfish =

Submarine of the United States

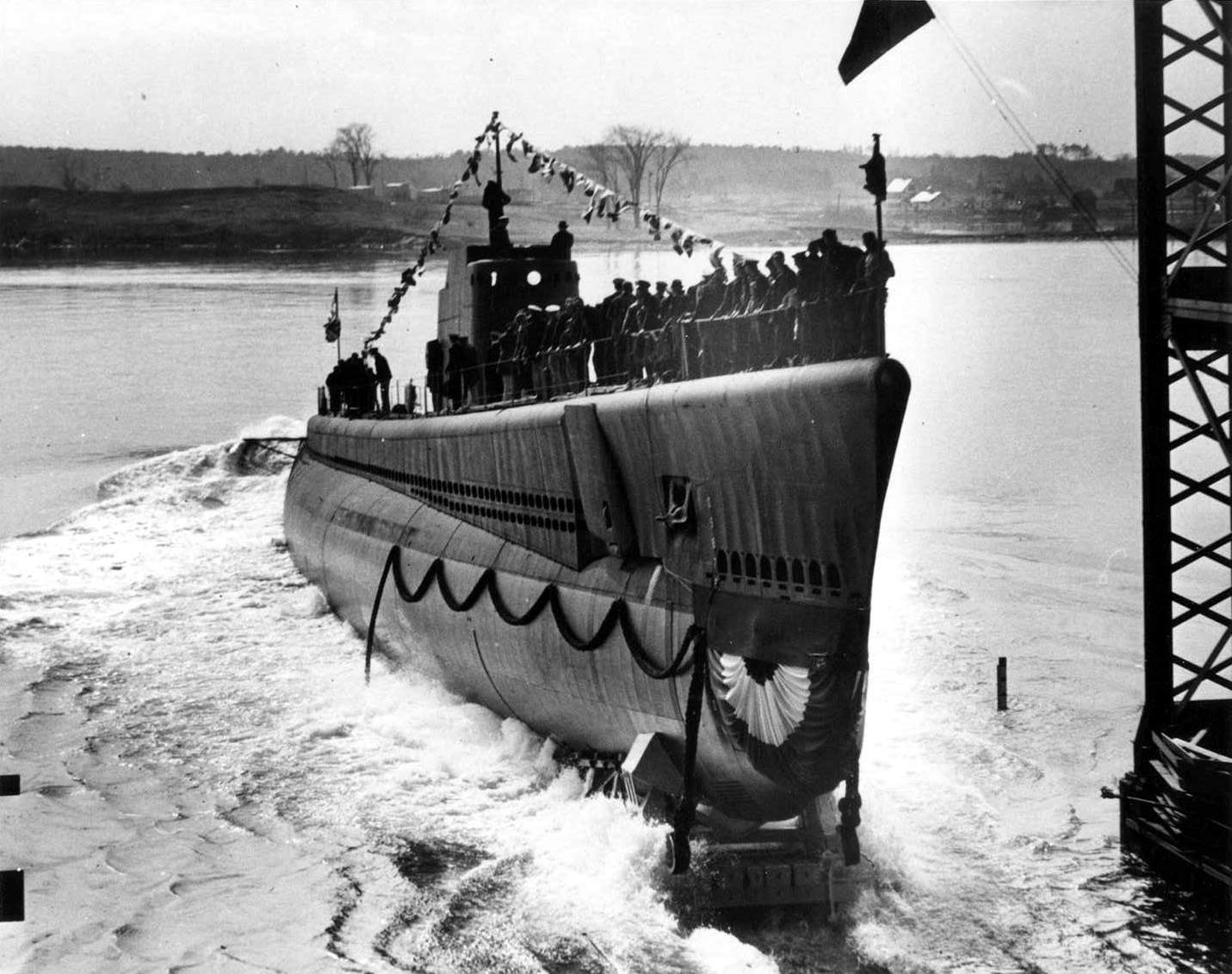
- The crew of the Kingfish (SS-234) line the rails as she slides down the launching ways at Portsmouth Navy Yard.

History

United States
- Builder: Portsmouth Naval Shipyard, Kittery, Maine
- Laid down: 29 August 1941
- Launched: 2 March 1942
- Sponsored by: Mrs. Harry A. Stuart
- Commissioned: 20 May 1942
- Decommissioned: 9 March 1946
- Stricken: 1 March 1960
- Fate: Sold for scrap, 6 October 1960

General characteristics
- Class & type: Gato-class diesel-electric submarine
- Displacement: 1,525 long tons (1,549 t) surfaced; 2,424 long tons (2,463 t) submerged
- Length: 311 ft 9 in (95.02 m)
- Beam: 27 ft 3 in (8.31 m)
- Draft: 17 ft (5.2 m) maximum
- Propulsion: 4 × Fairbanks-Morse Model 38D8-1/8 9-cylinder opposed-piston diesel engines driving electrical generators; 2 × 126-cell Sargo batteries; 4 × high-speed Elliott electric motors with reduction gears; 2 × propellers; 5,400 shp (4.0 MW) surfaced; 2,740 shp (2.04 MW) submerged
- Speed: 21 kn (39 km/h) surfaced; 9 kn (17 km/h) submerged
- Range: 11,000 nmi (20,000 km) surfaced at 10 kn (19 km/h)
- Endurance: 48 hours at 2 kn (4 km/h) submerged; 75 days on patrol
- Test depth: 300 ft (90 m)
- Complement: 6 officers, 54 enlisted
- Armament: 10 × 21-inch (533 mm) torpedo tubes; 6 forward, 4 aft; 24 torpedoes; 1 × 3-inch (76 mm) / 50 caliber deck gun; Bofors 40 mm and Oerlikon 20 mm cannon

USS Kingfish (SS-234), a Gato-class submarine, was the first ship of the United States Navy to be named for the kingfish.

== Construction and commissioning ==
Kingfish was laid down on 29 August 1941 by the Portsmouth Navy Yard at Kittery, Maine. She was launched on 2 March 1942, sponsored by Mrs. Harry A. Stuart, wife of Rear Admiral Harry A. Stuart, and commissioned on 20 May 1942, with Lieutenant Commander Vernon L. "Rebel" Lowrance in command.

== First war patrol, September – November 1942 ==
Kingfish arrived at Pearl Harbor from New London 31 August 1942, and sailed on her first war patrol from there 9 September. Patrolling close to Japan's coast, Kingfish sighted a three-ship convoy and fired a three-torpedo spread at the last freighter, scoring one hit. Unable to determine the extent of the damage due to an uncomfortably efficient barrage of depth charges (lasting 18 hours), Kingfish successfully outwitted her attackers and cleared the area.

Sighting freighter Yomei Maru 1 October, Kingfish fired a three torpedo spread which sent her to the bottom. Going deep for the inevitable depth charging, Kingfish reloaded her tubes and continued scouting shipping lanes. Four days later she sighted and torpedoed a freighter off Muroto Zaki but could not verify the sinking. Two weeks of frustration followed due to lack of targets. On 23 October the freighter Seiko Maru was sighted and sent to the bottom by two torpedoes. Completing her first war patrol, Kingfish arrived Midway Atoll 3 November.

== Second and third war patrols, November 1942 – April 1943 ==
After refit Kingfish sailed 25 November to Chichi-jima on her second war patrol. Entering the South China Sea 5 December, she sighted freighter Hino Maru No. 3 and sank it two days later. Then, on 28 December, she sent another freighter, Choyo Maru, to the bottom. Two trawlers were attacked by gunfire early in January. The first target was riddled and set afire, and the second sunk by gunfire. Kingfish ended this patrol at Pearl Harbor 23 January 1943.

Kingfish was underway for her third war patrol 16 February. On the sub's passage to Formosa, she sank a trawler off the Bonin Islands and torpedoed a passenger freighter. Damage to this ship could not be ascertained as the submarine was immediately attacked by enemy bombs and depth charges. On 17 March, a freighter was tracked and a precise torpedo spread damaged it considerably. Two days later Kingfish sighted, tracked, and sank a troop transport as enemy troops scrambled down her sides.

On 23 March, Kingfish was subjected to a severe depth charge attack. The attack was so intense and the damage so great that secret codes and material were burned in preparation for abandoning ship. The last string of depth charges bashed in the main induction piping, allowing a huge bubble to escape to the surface; this apparently caused the enemy to think the ship had sunk. Kingfish cautiously surfaced, cleared the area and set course for Pearl Harbor, arriving 9 April with a grateful crew. The submarine then proceeded to Mare Island Navy Yard, where entire sections of the boat were rebuilt and installed.

== Fourth and fifth war patrols, July – November 1943 ==
Battle damage repaired, Kingfish sailed back to Pearl Harbor, arriving 23 June 1943. Eight days later he sailed for her fourth war patrol, this one to the Babuyan Channel, north of the Philippines, off southern Formosa, and near Manila. Kingfish was ordered to depart the patrol area due to lack of enemy activity and to report to Fremantle, Australia, for refit.

Assigned the South China Sea for her fifth patrol area, Kingfish cleared Fremantle 24 September. She was assigned two special missions for this patrol. The first entailed planting mines in enemy shipping lanes; the second involved the secret and successful landing of a party of Allied personnel and equipment on the northeast coast of Borneo. Continuing on her patrol, Kingfish sank a gunboat by gunfire and damaged a tanker with torpedoes 9 October off Sibutu Islands. She sank cargo ship Sana Maru off Cape Varella 20 October. Her patrol a success, Kingfish sailed into Fremantle 14 November 1943.

== Sixth, seventh, and eighth war patrols, December 1943 – June 1944 ==
Kingfish departed Fremantle on 16 December 1943 with a new commanding officer, Lieutenant Commander H. L. Jukes. Threading her way in the South China Sea, she made first contact on 3 January when she sent tankers Ryuei Maru and Bokuei Maru to the bottom, and sank tanker Fushimi Maru No. 3 7 January. Having navigated brilliantly through extremely dangerous waters and having outwitted the enemy escort vessels, Kingfish headed for Pearl Harbor with a proud record, arriving 26 January 1944.

Kingfish's seventh war patrol was in the Mariana Islands area from 19 February – 9 April 1944. The submarine made no attacks during this patrol, although the boat underwent a bombing and depth charge attack. Kingfish departed her patrol area, arriving Majuro, Marshall Islands, 9 April for refit.

The submarine's eighth war patrol was made in the Bonins. Since this patrol was also unfruitful due to the lack of worthwhile targets, Kingfish received orders to return to Midway, arriving there 19 June. While there she was ordered to Mare Island, for overhaul.

== Ninth and tenth war patrols, October 1944 – February 1945 ==
Her overhaul completed, and with a new commanding officer, (Commander T. E. Harper, Kingfish sailed from Pearl Harbor on her ninth war patrol 12 October. On 24 October, the day Kingfish entered her patrol area, she spotted freighter Ikutagawa Maru and sent her to the bottom off Chichi Jima Retto. Three days later she sank the cargo ship Tokai Maru No. 4 and a landing craft transport off Kita, Iwo Jima. Changing patrol areas to Okinawa, Kingfish tracked a convoy but was unable to attack. The submarine completed her patrol at Guam 28 November.

On 23 December 1944 Kingfish steamed out of Guam toward the Japanese home islands for her tenth war patrol. A convoy was sighted 2 January 1945, but heavy weather prevented the submarine from attacking. The following night she made up for lost time, sending the freighter Yaei Maru and the passenger/cargo ship Shibozono Maru to the bottom. For the remainder of the patrol Kingfish was assigned the additional task of "lifeguard" duties for carrier air strikes. She returned to Guam 1 February.

== Eleventh and twelfth war patrols, March – August 1945 ==
The submarine refitted at Guam and sailed 6 March, operating in a coordinated attack group with Icefish and Sawfish. Despite thorough coverage, no targets worthy of torpedo fire were encountered. However, late in March Kingfish experienced the great pleasure of rescuing four downed aviators from a British task force. Leaving the area, Kingfish debarked the British aviators at Saipan and set course for Pearl Harbor, arriving 25 April.

Departing Hawaii 17 June with a new commanding officer, Lieutenant Commander T. D. Keegan, the submarine sailed via Guam for the Japanese island of Honshū. In smartly executed night gun attacks, she sank two sampan picket boats off Honshū 5 August. She also exploded several drifting mines during this patrol. Having completed her 12th and last war patrol, Kingfish arrived Midway 2 hours before the war ended.

== Post-war service ==
Kingfish got underway for Galveston, Tex., 27 August via Pearl Harbor and the Panama Canal, arriving 23 September. She sailed to Orange, Tex., 25 October for Navy Day.

Kingfish sailed 30 October to New London, Conn., arriving 5 November. There, she was decommissioned and placed in reserve 9 March 1946. She was struck from the Navy List on 1 March 1960. On 6 October 1960, she was sold for scrap to Albert Heller.

USS Kingfish (SS-234) made 12 war patrols, sinking 14 enemy ships totaling 48,866 tons, and was awarded 9 battle stars for World War II service.
