= Gulfport Shipbuilding Corporation =

Shipyard in Port Arthur, Texas, United States

Coordinates: 29.854781°N 93.945341°W

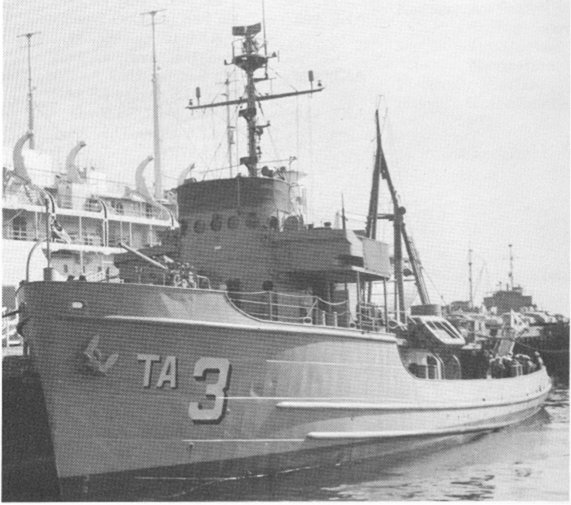
Gulfport's Ex-Pinola in South Korean Naval service as ROKS Do Bong (ATA-3), a Type V ship

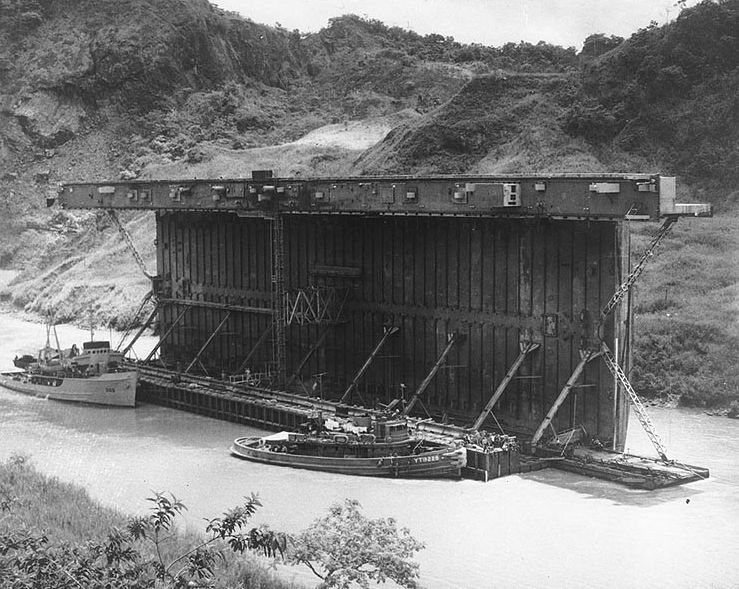
Gulfport's USS Umpqua (left) and Alarka (center) guide the center section of YFD-6 through Culebra Cut in the Panama Canal, circa May–June 1945. Navy SeaBees turned Auxiliary floating drydock AFDM-3-YFD-6's center section on its side and installed many pontoons atop the wing wall to allow the drydock to float on its side during the canal transit.300x300px

Gulfport Shipbuilding Corporation (also called Gulfport Boiler & Welding Works) was a shipbuilding company at Port Arthur, Texas, formed as Gulfport Boiler & Welding Works opened in 1930. For World War II Gulfport built Tank Barges a Type B ship and Tugboats a Type V ship. The shipyard closed in 1985.

  - Notable ship:
- USS Pinola (ATA-206)
- USS Winnetka (YTB-376)
- USS Challenge (ATA-201)
- USS Wandank (ATA-204)
- HMS Tancred (W 104)
- USS Sciota (ATA-205)
- USS Navigator (ATA-203)
- USS Umpqua (ATA-209) drydock

Category:Ships built in Port Arthur, Texas
