= Kinesaki-class food supply ship =

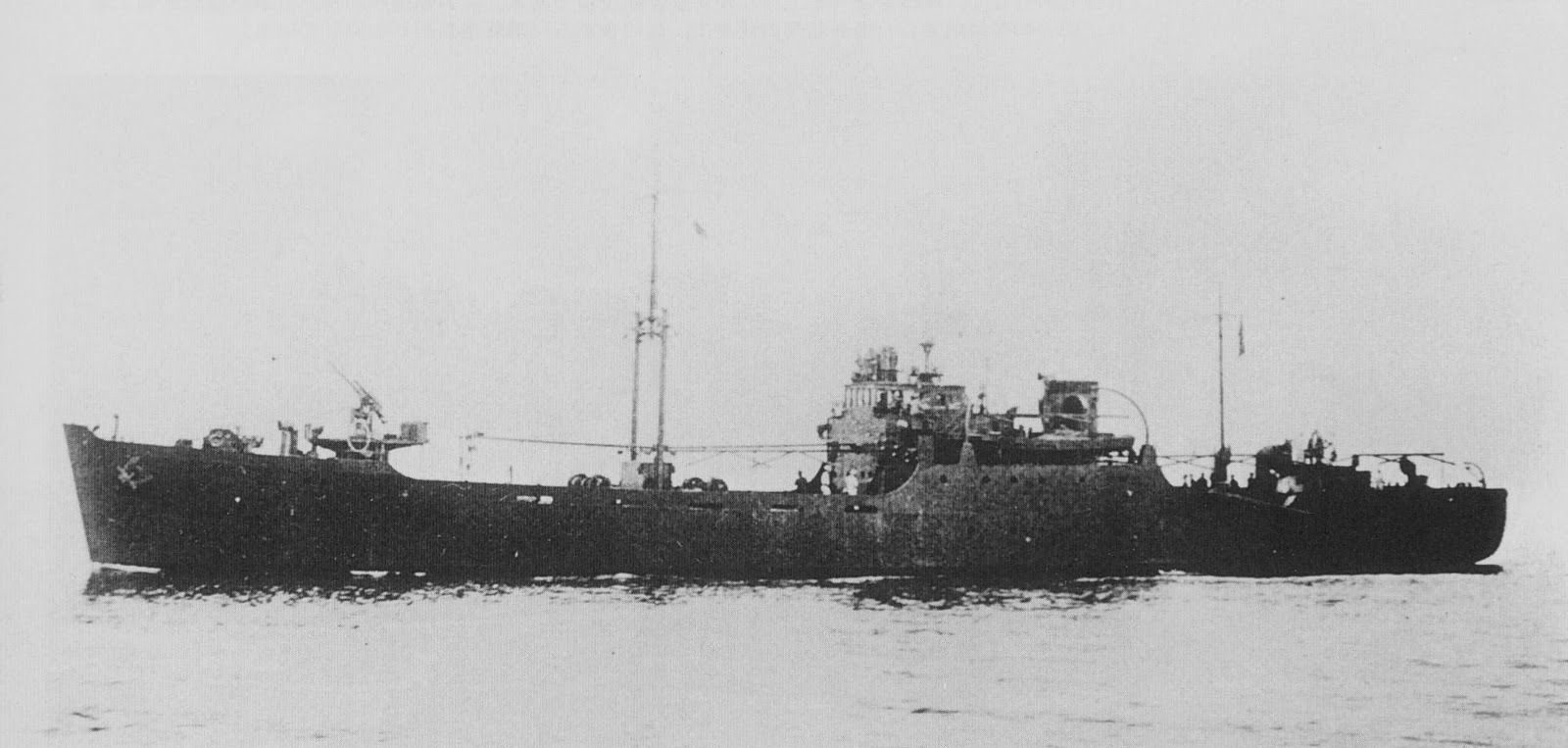
- Arasaki in May 1943 at Osaka Bay

Class overview
- Name: Kinesaki class
- Builders: Ōsaka Iron Works; Hitachi Zōsen Corporation
- Operators: Imperial Japanese Navy; Republic of China Navy; Soviet Navy; Government of Japan
- Cost: 1,574,000 JPY in 1939; 2,110,000 JPY in 1940; 2,928,000 JPY in 1942
- Built: 1940–1943
- In commission: 1940–1945 (Imperial Japanese Navy); 1947–1970 (Republic of China Navy)
- Planned: 11
- Completed: 4
- Canceled: 7
- Lost: 1
- Retired: 3

General characteristics
- Type: Food supply ship
- Displacement: 910 long tons (925 t) standard; 950 long tons (965 t) trial
- Length: 62.29 m (204 ft 4 in) overall
- Beam: 9.40 m (30 ft 10 in)
- Draught: 3.11 m (10 ft 2 in)
- Propulsion: 2 × Kampon Mk. 23A Model 8 diesels; 2 shafts, 1,600 bhp
- Speed: 15 knots (17 mph; 28 km/h)
- Range: 3,500 nmi (6,500 km) at 12 kn (14 mph; 22 km/h)
- Capacity: Kinesaki, 1940; 82 tons frozen food; 57.7 tons fresh water; Hayasaki, 1942; 85 tons frozen food; 71.7 tons fresh water
- Complement: 67
- Armament: Kinesaki, 1940; 1 × 76.2 mm (3.00 in) L/40 AA gun; 2 × 13.2 mm (0.52 in) AA guns; 8 × depth charges

The Kinesaki-class food supply ship (杵埼型給糧艦, Kinesaki-gata kyūryōkan) was a class of four reefer ships of the Imperial Japanese Navy (IJN), serving during and after World War II. Eleven vessels were planned under the Maru 4 Programme, Maru Rin Programme (Ship #261–263), and Kai-Maru 5 Programme (Ship #5401–5407); however, only four vessels were completed.

== Construction ==
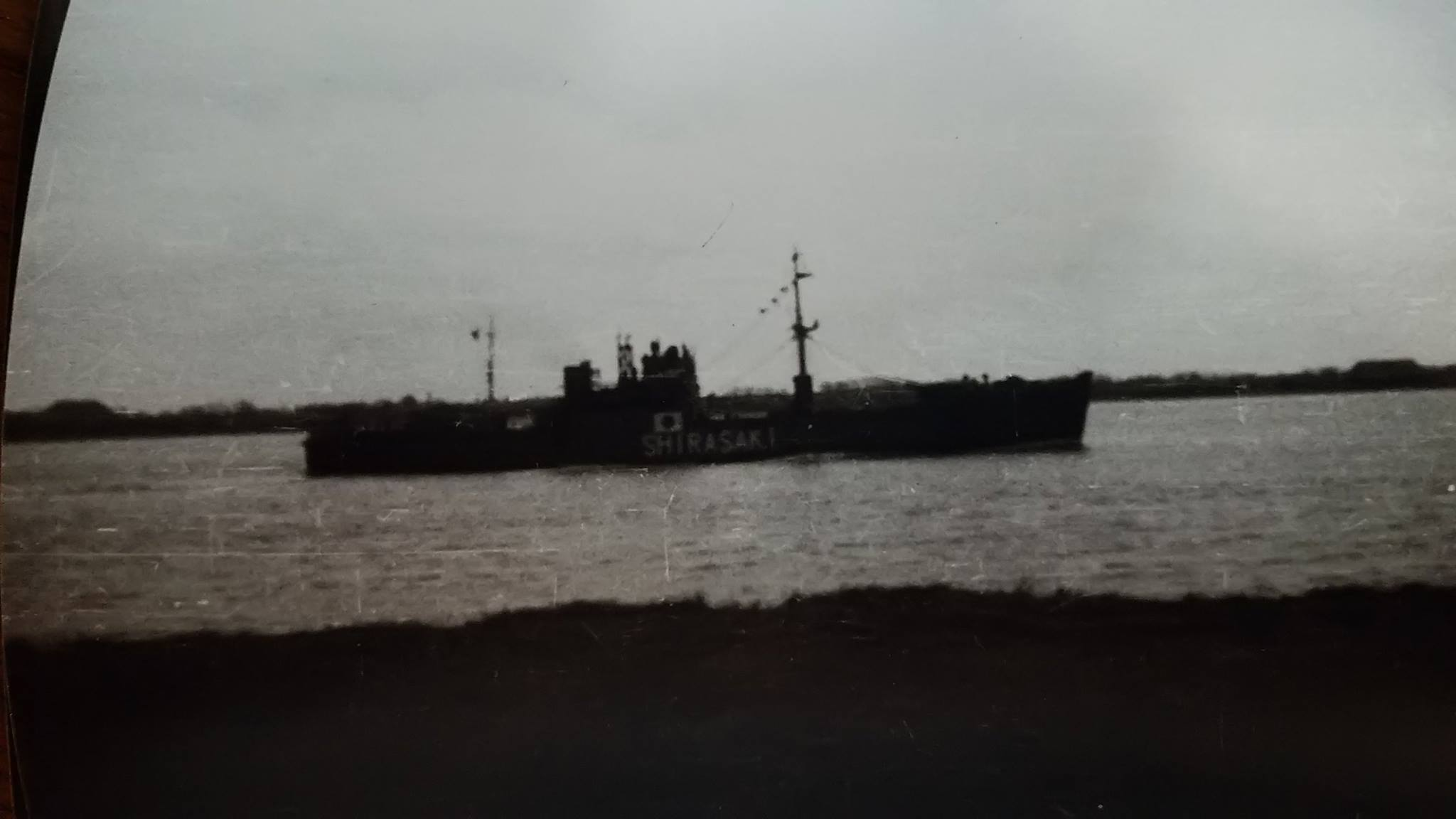
Shirasaki (unknown date and location)

In 1939, the IJN planned two food supply ships for the China Area Fleet under the Maru 4 Programme. One was the 600-ton type Nosaki (initially named Support ship No. 4007), the other the 1,000-ton type Kinesaki (initially named Support ship No. 4006). The Navy then ordered several more ships to the design of the Kinesaki; these became the Hayasaki, Shirasaki, and Arasaki. The Navy intended to order several more ships of this design by 1942, but Japan's worsening situation in the war by this stage led to the abandonment of these plans.

== Service ==
The Kinesaki served in the Central Pacific Area, the Hayasaki in the Southwest Area, the Shirasaki in the Northeast Area, and the Arasaki in the Southeast Area. They also undertook convoy escort operations. The Kinesaki was sunk in March 1945, while the other ships of the class survived the war.

== Ships in class ==
Ship #	Ship	Builder	Laid down	Launched	Completed	Fate
	Kinesaki (杵埼) (ex-Nanshin 南進) (ex-Support ship No. 4006)	Ōsaka Iron Works, Sakurajima Factory	7 March 1940 as Support ship No. 4006	27 June 1940	30 September 1940	Renamed Nanshin on 25 October 1940. Renamed Kinesaki on 1 April 1942. Sunk by air raid at Amami Ōshima on 1 March 1945.
261	Hayasaki (早埼)	Ōsaka Iron Works, Sakurajima Factory	2 December 1941	21 May 1942	31 August 1942	Decommissioned on 5 October 1945. Surrendered to the Soviet Union on 3 October 1947 at Nakhodka.
262	Shirasaki (白埼)	Ōsaka Iron Works, Sakurajima Factory	18 May 1942	5 November 1942	30 January 1943	Decommissioned on 5 October 1945. Surrendered to the Republic of China on 3 October 1947 at Qingdao, renamed Wu Ling (AKL-311). Decommissioned on 1 May 1970.
263	Arasaki (荒埼)	Hitachi Zōsen, Sakurajima Factory	10 November 1942	27 February 1943	29 May 1943	Decommissioned on 5 October 1945. Surrendered to the United States on 3 October 1947 at Qingdao, sold to Japan that same day. Transferred to the Ministry of Agriculture and Forestry and renamed Umitaka Maru (海鷹丸) in April 1948. Sold to the Philippines in April 1967.
5401; 5402; 5403; 5404; 5405; 5406; 5407	Kiyosaki (清埼); Ōsaki (大埼); Hesaki (部埼); Kashizaki (樫埼); Kuresaki (呉埼); Misaki (三埼); Fujisaki (藤埼)	Cancelled on 5 May 1944.				

== Bibliography ==
- "Rekishi Gunzō"., History of the Pacific War Vol. 51 The truth histories of the Japanese Naval Vessels part-2, Gakken (Japan), 2005, ISBN 4-05-604083-4.
- The Maru Special, Japanese Naval Vessels No. 34 Japanese Auxiliary ships, Ushio Shobō (Japan), 1979.
- Shizuo Fukui, Collection of writings by Sizuo Fukui Vol. 10, "Stories of Japanese Support Vessels", Kōjinsha (Japan), 1993, ISBN 4-7698-0658-2.
- Senshi Sōsho Vol. 31, Naval armaments and war preparation (1), "Until November 1941", Asagumo Simbun (Japan), 1969.
- Senshi Sōsho Vol. 88, Naval armaments and war preparation (2), "And after the outbreak of war", Asagumo Simbun (Japan), 1975.
