= HMAS Reserve =

Tugboat of the Royal Australian Navy

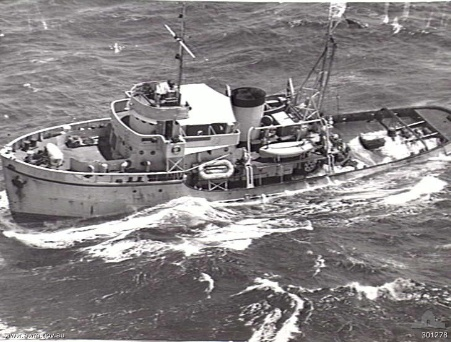
- HMAS Reserve in 1951

History

Australia
- Builder: Levingston Shipbuilding Company, Orange, Texas
- Acquired: 10 December 1942 (Commonwealth Marine Salvage Board); 1943 (RAN)
- Commissioned: 17 August 1943
- Decommissioned: 19 October 1953
- Identification: IMO number: 5417052
- Honours and awards: Battle honours: New Guinea 1943-44
- Fate: Sold 21 September 1961

General characteristics
- Displacement: 800 tons
- Length: 143 ft (44 m)
- Beam: 33 ft 1 in (10.08 m)
- Draught: 14 ft 7 in (4.45 m)
- Speed: 16 knots (30 km/h; 18 mph)
- Armament: 1 × 3 inch HA/LA gun, 2 × Oerlikon 20 mm cannon, 2 × M2 Browning machine gun
- Notes: Ship characteristics from

HMAS Reserve was a tugboat operated by the Royal Australian Navy (RAN) between 1943 and 1953.

== Construction ==
She was built by the Levingston Shipbuilding Company, Orange, Texas during 1942.

== Operational history ==
Reserve was acquired by the Australian Commonwealth Marine Salvage Board on 10 December 1942. She was commissioned into the RAN on 17 August 1943 and served off eastern Australia and in the South West Pacific. During late 1943 and 1944, she participated in the Allied landings at Cape Gloucester, the Admiralty Islands, Saidor, Hollandia, Wakde, Leyte and Mindoro.

The ship received the battle honour 'New Guinea 1943-44" for her wartime service.

== Decommissioning and fate ==
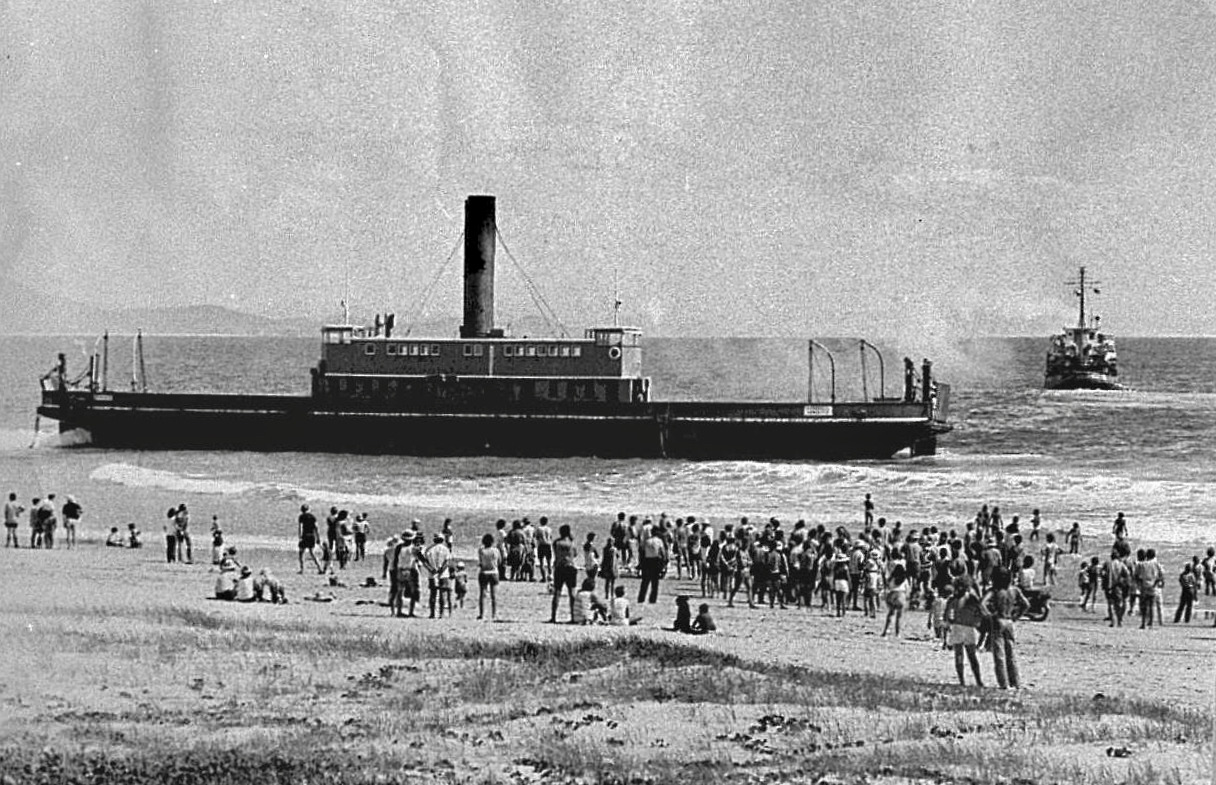
Polaris, formerly HMAS Reserve, unsuccessfully attempts to pull the wrecked Sydney car ferry, Koondooloo, off the beach at Trial Bay, 1972

Reserve remained in service with the RAN until 19 October 1953 when she was decommissioned. She was subsequently sold on 21 September 1961.

Sold to Filipino interests, she was renamed Polaris. She was used in an ill-fated attempt to tow 4 vessels from Newcastle to Manila, being former Sydney ferries, (Kalang, Koondooloo and Kooroongabba and former Hobart vessel, Lurgerena). Kooroongabba sank, and the other three vessels beached themselves at Trial Bay while Polaris was at anchor for repairs. The tug tried to remove the old ferries, but they remained fast. Their timber superstructures were broken up by the waves, and their rusted steel structures remain in the sands of the beach. Defeated, Polaris returned to the Philippines.
