= USS Navigator (ATA-203) =

Tugboat of the United States Navy

History

United States
- Name: USS Navigator (ATA-203)
- Builder: Gulfport Boiler & Welding Works, Port Arthur, Texas
- Laid down: 10 September 1944
- Launched: 26 October 1944
- Commissioned: USS ATA-203, 1 January 1945
- Decommissioned: 20 October 1946
- Renamed: USS Navigator (ATA-203), 16 July 1948
- Stricken: 1 September 1962
- Fate: disposed of as a target

General characteristics
- Class & type: Sotoyomo-class auxiliary fleet tug
- Displacement: 534 t.Long tons 835 t. Full load
- Length: 143 ft (44 m)
- Beam: 33 ft (10 m)
- Draft: 13 ft (4.0 m)
- Propulsion: diesel-electric engines, single screw
- Speed: 13 knots (24 km/h; 15 mph)
- Complement: 45
- Armament: 1 × single 3"/50 caliber gun mount; 2 × single 20 mm AA gun mounts

ATA–203, originally designated ATR–130, was laid down by the Gulfport Boiler & Welding Works, Port Arthur, Texas, 10 September 1944; launched 26 October 1944; and commissioned 1 January 1945.

Following shakedown, ATA–203 departed Texas for Coco Solo, thence with 2 YTBs in tow, she headed for Pearl Harbor, arriving 9 March. Exchanging the YTBs for pontoon barges, the auxiliary tug steamed westward, 16 March, and on 22 May cast off her charges in Nakagusuku Wan, Okinawa. She performed towing jobs in the Okinawa area, then on 11 June, headed south to Leyte. From there towing assignments took her to the New Hebrides, New Guinea, and finally back to Okinawa where she reported for duty to ComMinPac, 30 August.

On 8 September, she got underway for the Japanese home islands, reporting to ComMinDiv 7, off Kyushu, 11 September. Until 29 December she conducted hydrographic surveys off Sasebo, Omura, and Nagasaki, acted as a mine destruction vessel and assisted storm damaged ships. Then detached from all duties in Mine Force, Pacific, she took up towing services for the occupation forces.

On 14 March 1946, ATA–203 headed home, reporting to ComServLant 22 June. Assigned to the 16th (Reserve) Fleet, she decommissioned 20 October 1946 arid was berthed at Orange, Texas. Named Navigator, 16 July 1948, she was transferred to the Maritime Administration in August 1960 and was laid up at Mobile, Alabama, as a unit of the National Defense Reserve Fleet. She remains there into 1970.
