= USS Challenge (ATA-201) =

Tugboat of the United States Navy

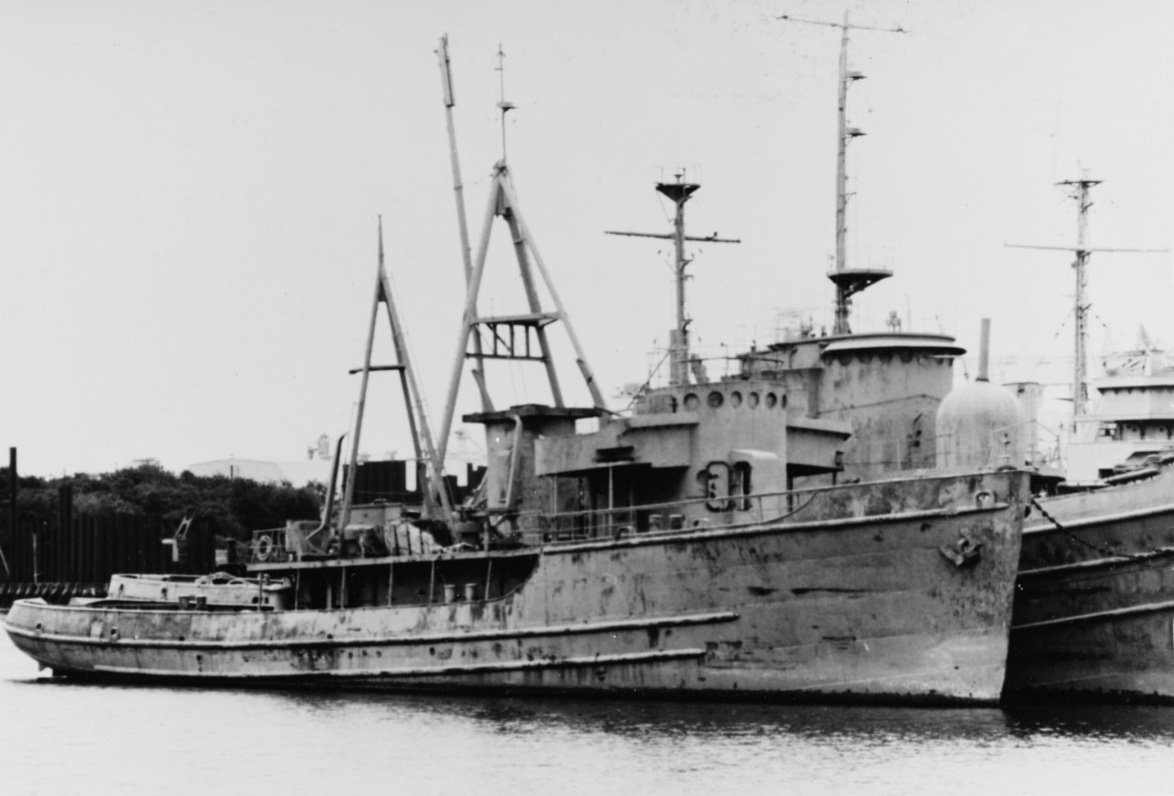
- Challenge laid up after being decommissioned

History

United States
- Name: USS Challenge
- Ordered: as Rescue Ocean Tug ATR-128, redesignated Auxiliary Fleet Tug ATA-201, 15 May 1944
- Builder: Gulfport Boiler & Welding Works, Port Arthur, Texas
- Laid down: 3 August 1944
- Launched: 23 September 1944
- Acquired: 22 November 1944
- Commissioned: 15 September 1944
- Decommissioned: 23 December 1947
- Renamed: Challenge (ATA-201), 16 July 1948
- Stricken: 1 September 1962
- Identification: IMO number: 8424135; MMSI number: 334632000; Callsign: HQWZ9
- Status: In service as Saje Commander

General characteristics
- Class & type: Sotoyomo-class auxiliary fleet tug
- Displacement: 610 long tons (620 t) light; 860 long tons (874 t) full
- Length: 143 ft (44 m)
- Beam: 34 ft (10 m)
- Draft: 15 ft (4.6 m)
- Propulsion: Diesel-electric engines, single screw
- Speed: 13 knots (24 km/h; 15 mph)
- Complement: 7 officers, 42 enlisted men
- Armament: 1 × single 3"/50 caliber gun; 2 × twin 40 mm AA gun mounts

USS Challenge (ATA-201) was a Sotoyomo-class auxiliary fleet tug acquired by the United States Navy for service during and after World War II.

Challenge was planned and authorized as Rescue Ocean Tug ATR-128 and was reclassified Auxiliary Fleet Tug ATA-201, 15 May 1944. She was laid down on 3 August 1944 at Gulfport Boiler & Welding Works, Port Arthur, Texas, launched on 23 September 1944, delivered to the Navy on 22 November 1944, commissioned as USS ATA-201 on 15 September 1944.

== East Coast activity ==
Challenge served on the U.S. East Coast. Very little data is available. However, Navy records indicate she towed Bangust (DE-739) from Green Cove Springs, Florida, to Charleston, South Carolina, in 1947.

== Final disposition ==
Challenge was decommissioned on 23 December 1947 and struck from the Naval Vessel Register on 1 September 1962. The ship was named USS Challenge (ATA-201) on 16 July 1948. She was sold for scrapping on 1 October 1976 by the Defense Reutilization and Marketing Service, but was resold in 1978 into commercial service. As of 2017, she was operating out of Honduras under the name Saje Commander.
