= Japanese food supply ship Nosaki =

Imperial Japanese Navy ship

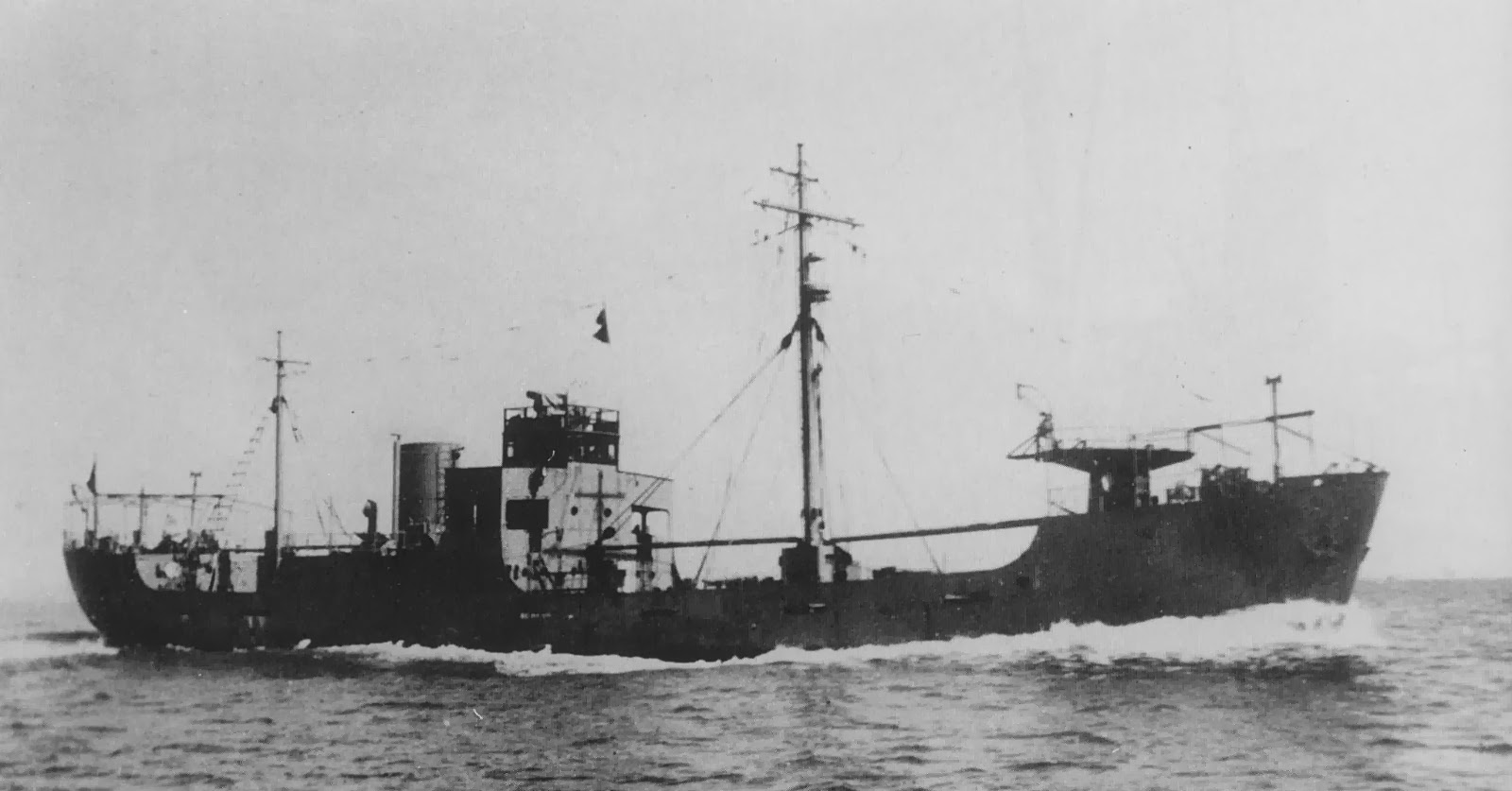
- Nosaki (as Nankai) trial run in 1941

History

Japan
- Name: Nosaki
- Namesake: Nankai: Southern Sea; Nosaki: Nosaki Point
- Ordered: fiscal 1939
- Builder: Mitsubishi Heavy Industries, Shimonoseki shipyard
- Cost: 1,574,000 JPY
- Laid down: 18 October 1939
- Launched: 22 July 1940
- Completed: 18 March 1941
- Decommissioned: struck on 10 March 1945
- Renamed: Support ship No.4007; Nankai on 25 October 1940; Nosaki on 1 April 1942
- Reclassified: Miscellaneous service ship as built; Food supply ship on 1 April 1942
- Fate: Torpedoed and sunk by USS Dace, 28 December 1944

General characteristics
- Type: Food supply ship
- Displacement: 640 long tons (650 t) standard
- Length: 48.37 m (158.7 ft) waterline
- Beam: 8.20 m (26 ft 11 in)
- Draught: 2.88 m (9 ft 5 in)
- Propulsion: 2 × Kampon Mk.23B model 6 diesels, 2 shafts, 1,200 bhp
- Speed: 13 knots (15 mph; 24 km/h)
- Range: 2,000 nmi (3,700 km) at 12 kn (14 mph; 22 km/h)
- Endurance: Fuel: 39 tons oil
- Capacity: 43.1 tons frozen food; 40 tons fresh water
- Complement: 35
- Armament: 1 × 76.2 mm (3.00 in) L/40 AA gun

The Nosaki (野埼) was a food supply ship (reefer ship) of the Imperial Japanese Navy (IJN) serving during World War II, the only ship of her class.

== Background ==
In 1939, the IJN planned two food supply ships for China Area Fleet under the Maru 4 Programme. One was the 1,000 ton Kinesaki (initial named Support ship No.4006), the other the 600 ton Nosaki (initial named Support ship No.4007). Their duty was to deliver fresh fish to the fleet. Therefore, they installed a large freezer in the hull of each ship, and in appearance they looked like fishing trawlers. The IJN compared Kinesaki with Nosaki, and they decided to mass-produce Kinesaki.

== Career ==
- 18 October 1939: Laid down as Support ship No.4007 (公称第4007号) at Mitsubishi Heavy Industries, Shimonoseki shipyard.
- 22 July 1940: Launched.
- 25 October 1940: Renamed Nankai (南海).
- 18 March 1941: Completed and assigned to the Sasebo Naval District.
- 1 April 1942; Renamed Nosaki, classified miscellaneous service ship to special service ship (food supply ship), and assigned to the Kainan Guard District.
- (later): She engaged in food transportation along the coast of China, Taiwan, and French Indochina.
- 28 December 1944: Sunk by USS Dace off Cape Varella.
- 10 March 1945: Removed from the naval ship list.

== Works cited ==
- Fukui, Shizuo (December 1994). 写真 日本海軍全艦艇史 [The Complete Photo History of Japanese Navy Ships] (in Japanese). ISBN 4-584-17054-1.

== Bibliography ==
- Ships of the World special issue Vol.47 Auxiliary Vessels of the Imperial Japanese Navy, Kaijinsha, (Japan), March 1997
- The Maru Special, Japanese Naval Vessels No.34, Japanese auxiliary vessels, Ushio Shobō (Japan), December 1979
- Senshi Sōsho Vol.31, Naval armaments and war preparation (1), "Until November 1941", Asagumo Simbun (Japan), November 1969
