= MV Tassie III =

Motor vessel in United States Army

MV Tassie III (S-77) was a 120-ton steel motor vessel, which was requisitioned by the United States Army during the Second World War. She was carrying 80 tons of condemned ammunition when she was wrecked 28.638795°S 153.613906°E while sheltering at the jetty at Byron Bay, New South Wales, Australia, on 9 June 1945.

The Australian salvage tug Tancred salvaged most of the ammunition from the wreck in 1946.
