= USS Sea Dog =

Submarine of the United States

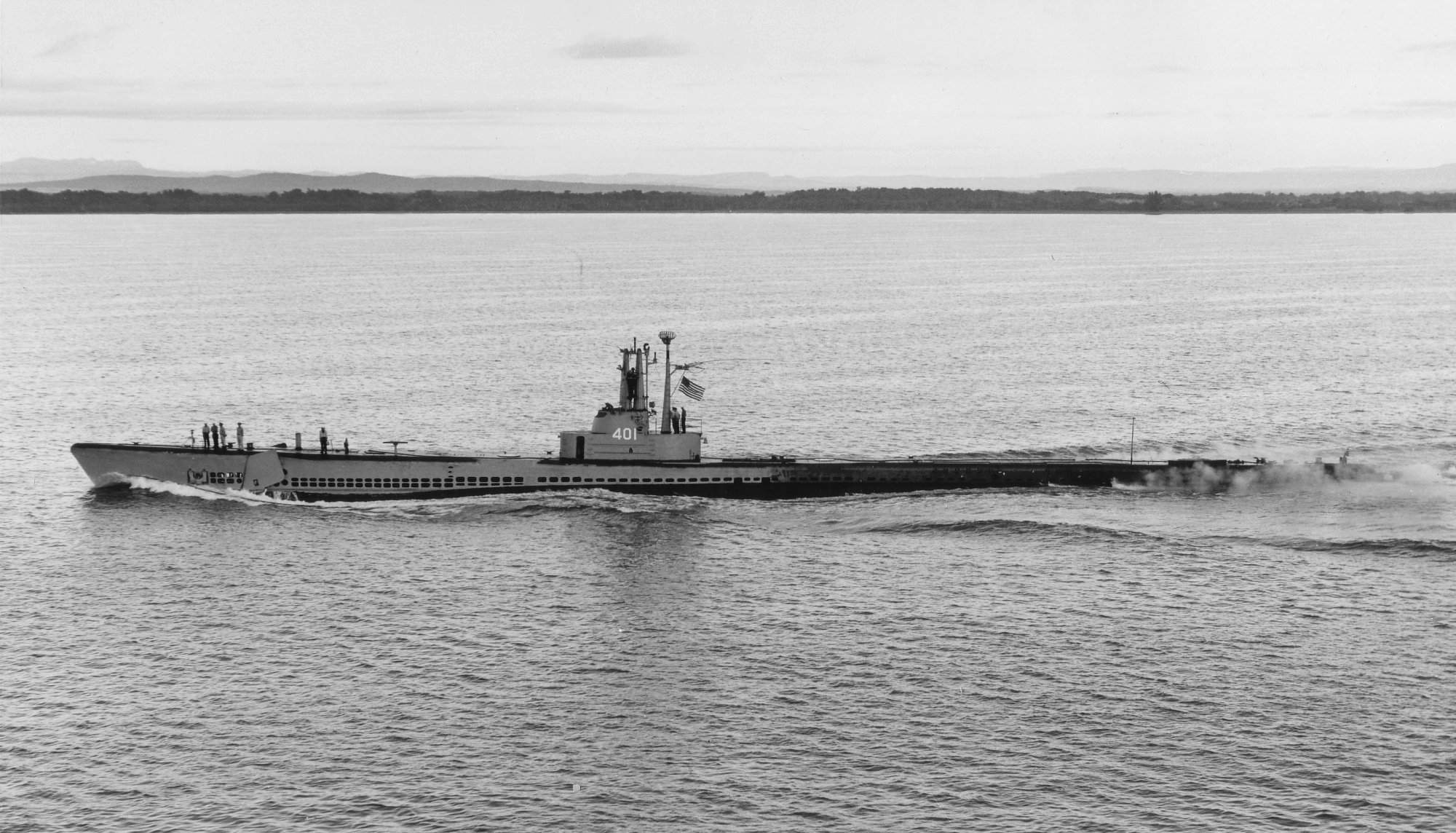

History

United States
- Builder: Portsmouth Naval Shipyard, Kittery, Maine
- Laid down: 1 November 1943
- Launched: 28 March 1944
- Commissioned: 3 June 1944
- Decommissioned: 27 June 1956
- Stricken: 2 December 1968
- Fate: Sold for scrap, 18 May 1973

General characteristics
- Class & type: Balao-class diesel-electric submarine
- Displacement: 1,526 long tons (1,550 t) surfaced; 2,391 long tons (2,429 t) submerged
- Length: 311 ft 6 in (94.95 m)
- Beam: 27 ft 3 in (8.31 m)
- Draft: 16 ft 10 in (5.13 m) maximum
- Propulsion: 4 × Fairbanks-Morse Model 38D8-⅛ 10-cylinder opposed piston diesel engines driving electrical generators; 2 × 126-cell Sargo batteries; 4 × high-speed Elliott electric motors with reduction gears; two propellers; 5,400 shp (4.0 MW) surfaced; 2,740 shp (2.0 MW) submerged
- Speed: 20.25 knots (37.50 km/h) surfaced; 8.75 knots (16.21 km/h) submerged
- Range: 11,000 nautical miles (20,000 km) surfaced at 10 knots (19 km/h)
- Endurance: 48 hours at 2 knots (3.7 km/h) submerged; 75 days on patrol
- Test depth: 400 feet (120 m)
- Complement: 10 officers, 70–71 enlisted
- Armament: 10 × 21-inch (533 mm) torpedo tubes; 6 forward, 4 aft; 24 torpedoes; 1 × 5-inch (127 mm) / 25 caliber deck gun; Bofors 40 mm and Oerlikon 20 mm cannon

USS Sea Dog (SS-401/AGSS-401) was a Balao-class submarine in the United States Navy. She was the first ship to be named for the dogfish, a small shark of the North Atlantic, considered destructive by fishermen.

Sea Dog was laid down on 1 November 1943 at the Portsmouth Navy Yard in Kittery, Maine. She was launched on 28 March 1944 sponsored by Mrs. Claire Dowden Lowrance, wife of the prospective commanding officer, and commissioned on 3 June 1944 with Commander Vernon L. Lowrance in command.

Following a month's training off the New England coast, Sea Dog sailed for Pearl Harbor to join Submarine Squadron (SubRon) 28 and prepare for her first war patrol. Arriving in Hawaii on 22 August, she sailed west on 13 September, topped off at Midway Island on 17 September; and entered her patrol area in the Nansei Shoto on 28 September.

== First War Patrol ==
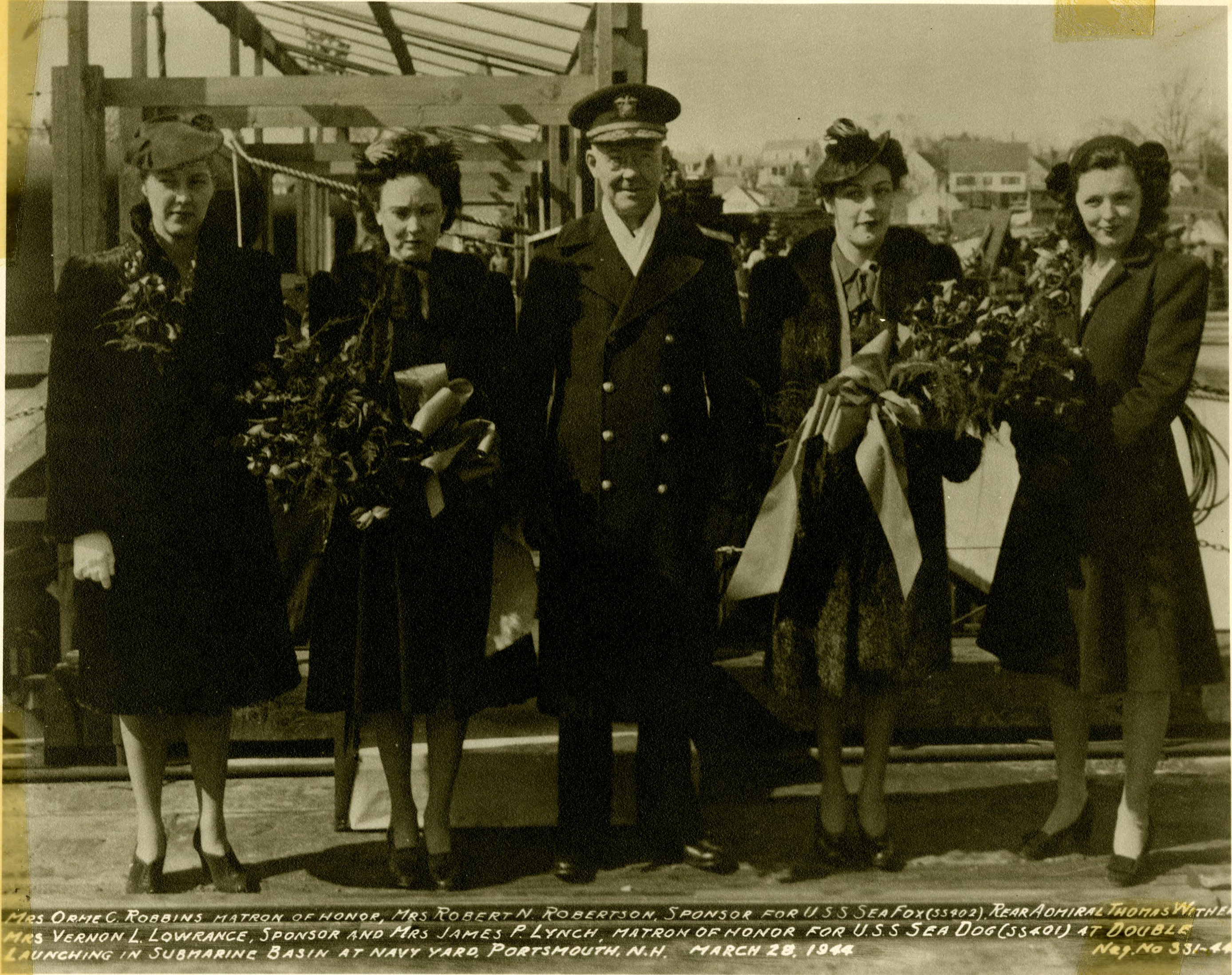
Mrs. Orme C. Robbins, matron of honor, Mrs. Robert N. Robertson, sponsor for Sea Fox. Rear Admiral Thomas Withers, Mrs. Vernon L. Lowrance, sponsor, and Mrs. James P. Lynch, matron of honor for USS Sea Dog at double launching in submarine basin at Navy Yard, Portsmouth, 28 March 1944.

With daylight traffic routed well inshore, she hunted unsuccessfully in the Kikaijima, Amami O Shima, and Okinoerabujima areas for the first few days, then searched the likely traffic lanes to Naha and Unten Ko. By 3 October, she had rounded Okinawa to patrol in the approaches to Nakagusuku Wan, and, by 6 October, she was again northwest of Okinawa in the Iheya Jima area.

Sea Dog remained west of Okinawa for another five days but found no targets worthy of a torpedo. On 10 October, however, she took an armed trawler under fire and left it burning.

On 11 October, she headed back into the Amami Gunto. A week later, she moved north into the Tokara Gunto and, on 22 October, while between the islands of Suwanosejima and Nakanoshima (Kagoshima), she sighted a convoy making eight to nine knots and zigging every five minutes.

Sea Dog moved ahead of the port column and, at 0726, fired as two cargo ships overlapped in a zig. A minute later, she lost depth control and dropped to 85 feet (26 m). Shortly after 0728, three loud explosions were heard. At 0732, the convoy's escorts began dropping depth charges. At 0745, breaking up noises were heard; and, at 0800, there was a dull, heavy explosion. Converted gun boat Tomitsu Maru and collier Muroto had been sunk. Depth charging continued for another two hours. In total, Japanese escorts and aircraft fired 109 depth charges at the Sea Dog, but LtCdr. Lowrance manages to evade the attack.

Sea Dog continued to patrol in the Tokara Gunto for another two days, then headed back to the Amami Gunto. On 28 October, she contacted and attacked, unsuccessfully, a formation of two battleships and a destroyer; and, on 29 October, she set an eastward course for Midway. On 30 October, she patrolled in the likely traffic lanes to the Bonin Islands, and, on 5 November, she reached Midway.

== Second War Patrol ==
Refitted by submarine tender Proteus (AS-19), Sea Dog got underway again on 29 November. On 1 December, she rendezvoused with submarines Guardfish (SS-217) and Sea Robin (SS-407) to form a coordinated attack group with the commanding officer of Sea Dog in charge of the wolfpack. On 8 December, the group stopped off at Saipan; and the next day headed west. On 14 December, the ships arrived on station in Balintang Channel to begin their patrol in the South China Sea.

The next 34 days were spent on station patrolling a trapezium-shaped area with Luzon, Hainan, Hong Kong and Formosa as the corners. On 3 January 1945, Sea Dog interrupted her hunting to repair her port reduction gear, without which she was limited to single shaft operations. On the night of 5 January, she and Sea Robin made contact with a small convoy and, despite heavy seas, commenced a surface approach. Shortly after 0100 on 6 January, Sea Robin attacked the lead ships and scored two hits. Sea Dog stalked the right rear ship, a converted escort. The target, however, foiled an attempt at a bow shot by reversing course. Further maneuvers for a stern tube attack were frustrated when the converted escort presented a zero angle on the bow and opened fire with her forward gun, estimated to be a three-inch. Sea Dog fired four "down-the-throat" and retired. No hits were scored.

On 18 January, the submarines closed Luzon Strait in hopes of sighting targets before leaving the area. Unsuccessful, they continued east. On 25 January, Sea Dog reached Guam, whence she continued on to Pearl Harbor.

Arriving on 5 February, Sea Dog's main engines were overhauled; the 40 millimeter gun was installed in a high position forward; and ST radar equipment was added. On 11 March, she got underway to return to Japanese waters.

== Third War Patrol ==
Assigned to patrol immediately south of the home islands, she spent 29 days in the area, with most of that time taken up in providing lifeguard services for aircraft strikes. From 22 to 24 March, she was on lifeguard duty to the southeast of the Nanpō Islands. On 25 March, she moved into that chain and, on 28 March she closed the Kyūshū coast off Cape Toi. The next day, lifeguard duty took her on a high speed run south to the Osumi Islands, where sea planes picked up the downed pilots as she arrived. A short while later, however, a third plane circled, then ditched eight miles off. Sea Dog picked up the pilot, submerged, and headed back to the Kyūshū coast.

At 1903, as she was making preparations to surface, she sighted an enemy I-boat which had just surfaced. Sea Dog took the offensive and fired on the submarine but not fast enough. The torpedoes missed, and the I-boat escaped.

Sea Dog remained off the Kyūshū coast for another day; then moved north to lifeguard duty south of Sagami Wan. Although assigned to cover both sides of the Izu Shoto, resulting in much of her time being spent on high speed runs south around Mikura-jima with no rescues being made at the end of the runs, potential target opportunities increased. On 2 April, she sighted and fired on a small minelayer. All torpedoes missed. On 16 April, she sank a medium-sized cargo ship, Toko Maru, between Hachijo Jima and Mikura-jima. A typhoon then interrupted both hunting and rescue operations; and, on 23 April, she headed for Guam.

== Fourth War Patrol ==
Refit took Sea Dog into May, when preparations were made for her last foray into Japanese home waters. Additional duties during the patrol included those of flagship for the nine-submarine Japan Sea Patrol Pack (TC 17.21). On 27 May, she departed Guam with the other two submarines of her immediate pack, Spadefish (SS-411) and Crevalle (SS-291). Later that day, the ships separated to proceed independently, planning to rendezvous on 4 June. On 28 May, one of Sea Dog's crew became seriously ill and was diagnosed as a possible pneumonia case. On 29 May, the submarine rendezvoused with Lamson (DD-367) and, after transferring the patient to that destroyer, continued on to the Sea of Japan.

On arrival, Sea Dog reconnoitered the approaches to western Honshū ports to locate minefields; then took up station off the east coast of Sado Island. At 2000 on 9 June, she sank her first target of the patrol, the small cargo ship, Sagawa Maru. Twenty-three minutes later, she made her second contact; and, at 2044, she fired three torpedoes at another merchant ship, the Shoyo Maru. One torpedo hit, starting a fire aft. Sea Dog pulled away, watched, then moved in for the coup de grace. Two more torpedoes were fired, one ran erratic; the second hit amidships. The target exploded; her bow broke off; and her stern assumed a 60-degree down angle.

Soon afterward, Sea Dog cleared the Niigata area and headed north to patrol off Sakata and Akita. On 10 June, she closed Oga Hanto, and that night she patrolled northwest of Kisakata and northeast of Tobishima, Minato Island. On 11 June, she returned to the vicinity of Oga Hanto. Shortly after 1300, she made contact with another coastal freighter, surfaced, and commenced running west and north to intercept. At 1519, she dived. At 1555, she fired one torpedo. Forty-three seconds later, the torpedo hit; and the target, cargo ship Kofuku Maru, broke in two, up-ending both the bow and the stern.

Sea Dog resumed her patrol to the southward. That night, she took up station to the north of Nyudozaki and, at 0635 on 12 June, sighted a small convoy as it rounded that headland and continued northward, through relatively shallow waters, toward Henashi Zaki. Sea Dog fired on the freighter farthest from the coast. Shinson Maru broke in two and sank in about two minutes. Her companions moved even closer to the coast. Sea Dog headed for deeper water and patrolled to the southwest.

On 13 June, Sea Dog was still off Oga Hanto. That evening, the starboard mine clearing cable, installed during the previous refit at Guam, parted and fouled the starboard screw. Sea Dog cleared the Japanese coast and stopped, lying-to while attempts were made to get divers down. Leaks in the face mask of the shallow water diving outfit, however, proved impossible to repair; and, soon after 0130 on 14 June, the submarine got underway. The noise and vibration from the starboard shaft was found to occur only for short periods at low speeds. At high speeds, its performance was satisfactory, and Sea Dog resumed her patrol, setting a southwest course for a surface patrol across the approaches to Akita, Sakata, and Niigata.

With daylight on 14 June, she dived, stopped her starboard propeller, and commenced hunting underwater. Less than an hour later, she sighted smoke and attempted to intercept. Her quarry, two cargo ships beat her into Sakata. That night, she moved northward again, and, at 0510 on 15 June, she sighted a passenger/cargo ship standing south past the northern end of Oga Hanto. At 0522, she fired a torpedo which hit just forward of amidships. Koan Maru sank in four minutes. Sea Dog cleared the area as small craft from the beach moved out to pick up survivors.

On 17 June, Sea Dog rotated areas with Spadefish and Crevalle and headed north to hunt along the Hokkaidō coast between Bakkai and Kamui Misaki. Two days later, she sighted three merchantmen moving northward along the coast and attacked, firing two torpedoes at the lead ship and three at the second. The third ship changed course. Sea Dog turned back to the previous targets. The first ship, cargo ship Kokai Maru, was going under, stern first. But, before she could fire again on the second ship, an enemy plane was sighted. Sea Dog dived. At 116 feet (35 m), she grounded; backed off, cleared and then headed north. The plane did not attack.

SS-401 remained in the area for several more days, then headed for Pearl Harbor. On 30 June, she arrived at Midway; and, on 5 July, she entered Pearl Harbor.

== Fifth War Patrol ==
On 13 August, she departed that port for her fifth war patrol. On 14 August, she received orders to cease hostilities; and, on 15 August, she reversed course for Pearl Harbor.

Sea Dog conducted training operations in the Hawaiian Islands during the remainder of August. On 6 September, she headed west with Redfish (SS-395), Scabbardfish (SS-397), and Sea Fox (SS-402); and, on 26 September, she arrived at Subic Bay in the Philippine Islands, to join the newly formed postwar squadron, SubRon 5.

== Post-War Duties ==
For the next three and one-half months, Sea Dog operated out of Subic Bay and, on 12 January 1946, set a course for the West Coast, arriving at San Francisco, California, on 2 February. Overhaul at Mare Island followed; and, in June, she returned to Pearl Harbor to prepare for her second postwar deployment to the Far East. During July, while en route to the Philippines, she conducted a mock war patrol. In August and early September, she provided antisubmarine training services to Seventh Fleet units in the Tsingtao area; and, at the end of the latter month, she returned to Pearl Harbor.

Through 1947, Sea Dog remained in the eastern Pacific, conducting training operations in the Hawaiian Islands and off the coasts of Washington, British Columbia, and California. In mid-January 1948, she again deployed to the western Pacific Ocean, where, after a visit to Australia, she again joined TG 71.2, the 7th Fleet's antisubmarine warfare training group at Tsingtao. On 2 March, she suffered minor damage in a collision with Furse (DD-882); and, after repairs, she headed back to Hawaii.

Two months later, Sea Dog cleared Pearl Harbor and headed north to the Bering Sea to collect hydrographic and oceanographic information. On her return to Pearl Harbor, 15 June, she resumed a schedule of local training exercises alternated with periods of antisubmarine warfare training services to Fleet Air Wing 4 off the Washington coast.

In January 1950, Sea Dog was again deployed to the western Pacific. On her return, she received orders to join the Atlantic Fleet. Departing Pearl Harbor in mid-June, she arrived at Norfolk in early July and commenced training services necessitated by the outbreak of the Korean War. In July 1952, Sea Dog was reassigned to SubRon 12 at Key West, Florida, whence she continued to provide training services.

On 7 November 1952, while conducting exercises with Airship Squadron 2 off Jacksonville, Florida, she intercepted a distress signal from a damaged U.S. Navy blimp, K-119, commanded by then-Lieutenant G. Robert Keiser, USN, and proceeded at flank speed to the last reported position to pick up Keiser and 2 other survivors, the co-pilot and navigator, for further transfer to the rescue and salvage ship USS Escape (ARS-6). The blimp itself, however, proved too waterlogged to be towed back to port and was taken under fire by Sea Dog. The gas tanks were penetrated, and the burning blimp sank.

Sea Dog remained based at Key West into the fall of 1955 when she was ordered to New London, Connecticut, to begin inactivation at Atlantic Reserve Fleet, New London. Arriving early in December, she proceeded to the Portsmouth Naval Shipyard in Maine for overhaul in January 1956; and, in May, she returned to New London, where she was decommissioned on 27 June. She remained in the New London Reserve Group until partially activated in February 1960 for service as a Naval Reserve training ship in the 1st Naval District. She served in that capacity until struck from the Naval Vessel Register on 2 December 1968. She was docked in Salem, Massachusetts as a floating museum until 1973 when she was sold for scrap.

Sea Dog earned two battle stars during World War II.

As of 2005, no other ship in the United States Navy has carried this name.
