= USS Umpqua (ATA-209) =

Tugboat of the United States Navy

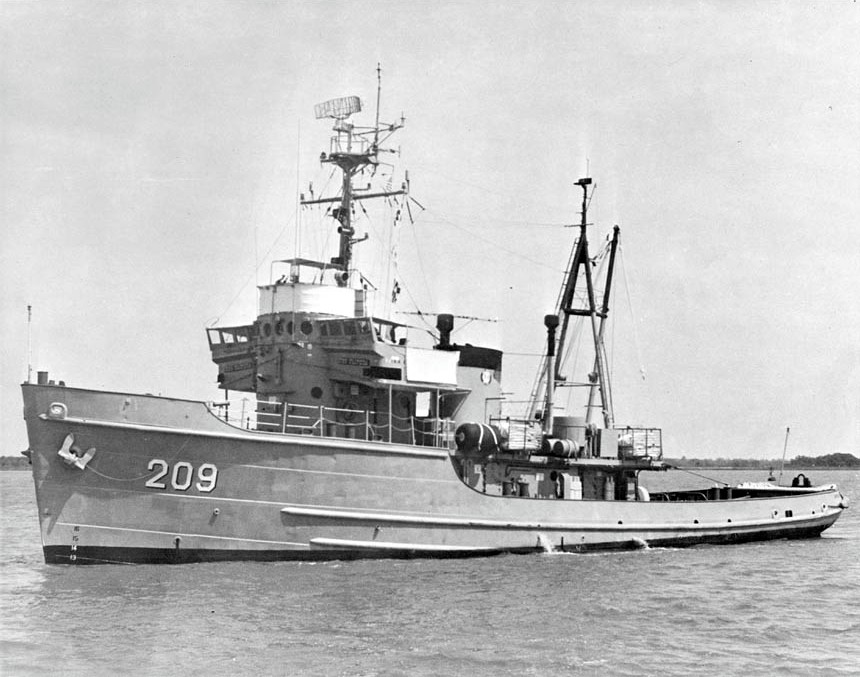
- Umpqua underway in the late 1960s

History

United States
- Name: USS Umpqua (ATA-209)
- Builder: Gulfport Boiler & Welding Works, Port Arthur, TX
- Laid down: 16 December 1944
- Launched: 2 February 1945
- Commissioned: USS ATA-209, 2 April 1945
- Renamed: USS Umpqua (ATA-209), 16 July 1948
- Decommissioned: 1 July 1971
- Stricken: 1 July 1971
- Fate: transferred to Colombia, 1 July 1971.

History

Colombia
- Name: ARC Bahia Honda (RM-74)
- Acquired: 1 July 1971
- Fate: Run aground, 1975; later scrapped

General characteristics
- Class & type: Sotoyomo-class auxiliary fleet tug
- Displacement: 534 t. (Long tons); 835 t. Full load
- Length: 143 ft (44 m)
- Beam: 33 ft (10 m)
- Draft: 13 ft (4.0 m)
- Propulsion: diesel-electric engines, single screw
- Speed: 13 knots (24 km/h; 15 mph)
- Complement: 45
- Armament: 1 × single 3"/50 caliber gun; 2 × twin 40 mm AA guns

USS Umpqua (ATA-209), originally designated ATR-136, was laid down as ATA-209 on 15 December 1944 at Port Arthur, Texas, by Gulfport Boiler & Welding Works; launched on 2 February 1945; and commissioned on 2 April 1945. She was the third United States Navy ship named for the Umpqua River, which was named for the Umpqua, a tribe of American Indians.

Following shakedown in the Gulf of Mexico, ATA-209 reported on the last day of April to Service Force, Atlantic. On 19 May, the auxiliary ocean tug departed New Orleans towing YF-756. She steamed via the Panama Canal and San Diego to Hawaii, arriving at Pearl Harbor early in July.

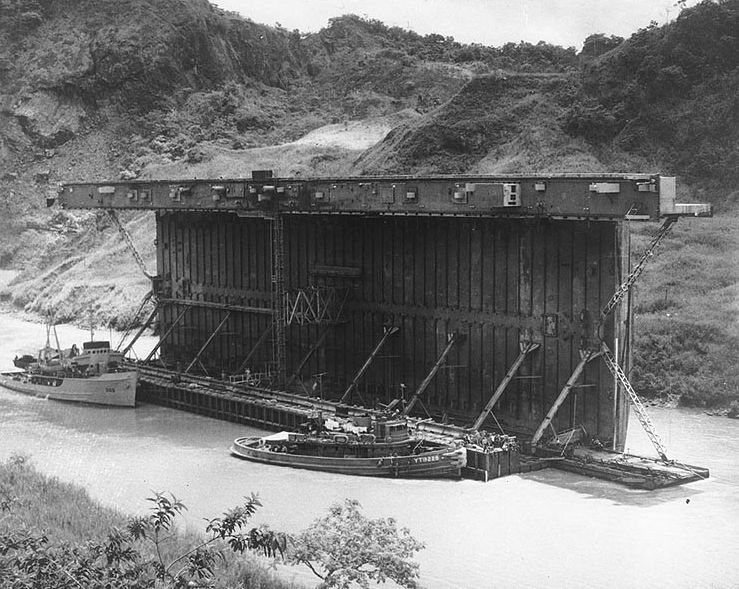
Umpqua (left) and Alarka (center) guide the center section of YFD-6 through Culebra Cut in the Panama Canal, circa May–June 1945. Navy SeaBees turned Auxiliary floating drydock AFDM-3-YFD-6's center section on its side and installed many pontoons atop the wing wall to allow the drydock to float on its side during the canal transit.

She operated on towing assignments between the Hawaiian Islands and the Marshall Islands until October when she set her course via San Francisco and the Panama Canal for Charleston. Arriving on 27 November, she reported to the Commandant, 6th Naval District, for duty; and, in April 1946, she was permanently assigned to that command. On 16 July 1948, she was named Umpqua.

Her primary job was that of towing ships, barges, and gunnery targets. She also participated in rescue and recovery operations. Her routine duties were performed mostly along the Atlantic and Gulf coasts and in the Caribbean, and they occasionally took the tug as far north as Nova Scotia. In the 1950s, she took part in calibration of radio navigation systems; and, in the 1960s, she assisted in oceanographic operations towing MONOB I, aka USS Monob One (YAG-61), the Bureau of Ships' mobile sound lab, to study sites in the Caribbean. In 1965, she varied her duties with the retrieval of a Titan III rocket booster in support of NASA tests. On two occasions, she towed old Liberty ship hulls loaded with unserviceable ammunition to a disposal area in the Atlantic where the ammunition was detonated, and the hulls were sunk.

In July 1967, Umpqua was transferred to the Service Force, Atlantic Fleet, and was assigned to Service Squadron 8. Umpqua continued her towing duties, assisting disabled and damaged naval vessels. Occasionally, she participated in torpedo recovery and mine-planting in conjunction with exercises of various Atlantic Fleet units. In May and June 1970, she towed USS Darby (DE-218) and USS Tweedy (DE-532) to sea for use as targets for destruction.

In 1971, as her career with the United States Navy drew to a close, Umpqua took part in Operation Springboard one last time and made one of her longest tows when she pulled ammunition ship USS Great Sitkin (AE-17) 120 miles to Puerto Rico after the ship had gone dead in the water at sea. In June 1971, Umpqua began training a Colombian Navy crew in preparation for the transfer of the tug. On 1 July, she was decommissioned; her name was struck from the Navy list; and she was turned over to the government of Colombia under the Military Assistance Program.

== ARC Bahia Honda (RM-74) ==
Sold to Colombia on 1 July 1971, the ship served in the Armada Nacional Colombiana as ARC Bahia Honda (RM-74). She ran aground in 1975 and was subsequently scrapped.
