= Japanese submarine chaser Hakuyo Maru =

History

Empire of Japan
- Name: Hakuyo Maru
- Builder: Endo Zoesensyo K.K., Osaka
- Sponsored by: Tanggu Transportation Co., Ltd
- Completed: 1940
- Acquired: Requisitioned by the Imperial Japanese Navy, 15 May 1944
- Stricken: 30 September 1945
- Home port: Tianjin
- Identification: 31597
- Fate: Scuttled, 11 January 1945
- Notes: Call sign: JECK

General characteristics
- Tonnage: 181 grt (513 m^{3}) standard
- Length: 30.7 m (100 ft 9 in) o/a
- Beam: 6.8 m (22 ft 4 in)
- Draught: 3.3 m (10 ft 10 in)
- Installed power: 390 hp (291 kW)
- Propulsion: steam

Hakuyo Maru (Japanese: 白鷹丸) was an auxiliary submarine chaser of the Imperial Japanese Navy during World War II.

== History ==
She was completed in 1940 at the Osaka shipyard of Endo Zoesensyo K.K. (株式會社遠藤造船所) at the behest of Tanggu Transportation Co., Ltd (株式會社塘沽運輸公司).

On 15 May 1944, she was requisitioned by the Imperial Japanese Navy and assigned to the Third Fleet under Captain Meiji Matsuoka (松岡梅治). She was registered in Tianjin. (There is some uncertainty to her origin because she also appears on a list of captured ships in 1944).

On 14 December 1944, her outfitting as a subchaser was completed. She was assigned to provide escort duty for the Imperial Japanese Army. On 9 January 1945, 175,000 soldiers of the US Sixth Army under the command of General Walter Krueger landed at Lingayen Gulf commencing the Battle of Luzon during the Philippines campaign. On 11 January 1945, Hakuyo Maru and auxiliary minesweeper Banshu Maru No. 56 were intentionally scuttled at the south entrance to Manila Bay to help prevent U.S. seaward access to Manila. She was struck from the Navy List on 30 September 1945.
