= USS Dace (SS-247) =

Submarine of the United States

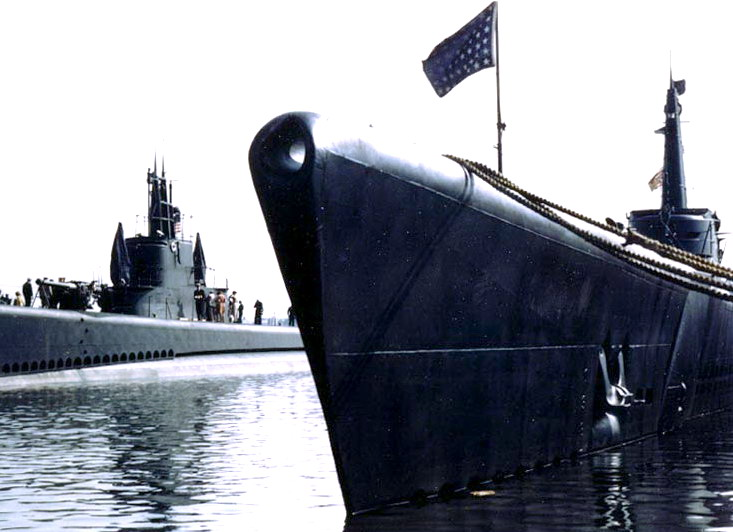
- USS Dace (SS-247), on the left

History

United States
- Name: USS Dace (SS-247)
- Builder: General Dynamics Electric Boat, Groton, Connecticut
- Laid down: 22 July 1942
- Launched: 25 April 1943
- Sponsored by: Mrs O. P. Robinson
- Commissioned: 23 July 1943
- Decommissioned: 12 February 1947
- Badge: Uss dace insignia.svg
- Recommissioned: 8 August 1951
- Decommissioned: 15 January 1954
- Recommissioned: 22 October 1954
- Decommissioned: 31 January 1955
- Stricken: 15 October 1972
- Fate: Converted to GUPPY IB and transferred to Italy, 31 January 1955

Italy
- Name: Leonardo da Vinci (S 510)
- Acquired: 31 January 1955
- Out of service: 1973
- Fate: Sold for scrap, 1 April 1975

General characteristics
- Class & type: Gato-class diesel-electric submarine
- Displacement: 1,525 long tons (1,549 t) surfaced; 2,424 long tons (2,463 t) submerged
- Length: 311 ft 9 in (95.02 m)
- Beam: 27 ft 3 in (8.31 m)
- Draft: 17 ft (5.2 m) maximum
- Propulsion: 4 × General Motors Model 16-248 V16 Diesel engines driving electric generators; 2 × 126-cell Sargo batteries; 4 × high-speed General Electric electric motors with reduction gears; two propellers; 5,400 shp (4.0 MW) surfaced; 2,740 shp (2.0 MW) submerged
- Speed: 21 kn (39 km/h) surfaced, 9 kn (17 km/h) submerged
- Range: 11,000 nmi (20,000 km) surfaced @ 10 kn (19 km/h)
- Endurance: 48 hours @ 2 kn (3.7 km/h) submerged, 75 days on patrol
- Test depth: 300 ft (91 m)
- Complement: 6 officers, 54 enlisted
- Armament: 10 × 21-inch (533 mm) torpedo tubes; 6 forward, 4 aft; 24 torpedoes; 1 × 3-inch (76 mm) / 50 caliber deck gun; Bofors 40 mm and Oerlikon 20 mm cannon

USS Dace (SS-247), a Gato-class submarine, was the first submarine of the United States Navy to be named for any of several small North American freshwater fishes of the carp family.

== Construction and commissioning ==
Dace′s keel was laid down by the Electric Boat Company of Groton, Connecticut, 22 July 1942. She was launched on 25 April 1943, sponsored by Mrs O. P. Robertson, and commissioned on 23 July 1943, Lieutenant Commander Joseph F. Enright in command.

== Service history ==
=== United States Navy ===
==== World War II ====
===== 1943 =====
Departing New London, Connecticut, on 7 September 1943, Dace arrived at Pearl Harbor on 3 October and 17 days later sailed on her first war patrol, bound for the southeast coast of Honshū and the approaches to Nagoya. On 7 November, she made her first contact with the enemy, damaging a freighter with torpedoes. Alert action by patrol craft prevented Dace from continuing her attack. She returned to Midway Island to refit from 11 December – 7 January 1944.

===== 1944 =====
On her second war patrol, Dace cruised the shipping lanes south of Truk. On the night of 26 January, she contacted a large tanker, guarded by two escorts. She fired a spread of torpedoes, heard five explosions, and broke off the contact to avoid the pursuit of the escort. The cause of the explosion is unknown, as Japanese records show no ship damaged in that area on that date. After refueling at Tulagi on 2–3 February, Dace continued her patrol close to Truk during carrier air raids there on 16–17 February. On 25 February, she arrived at Milne Bay, New Guinea, for refit.

Dace put to sea on her third war patrol on 18 March, and two days later, she embarked a group of commandos at Langemak Bay. For the next week, she scouted the coast around Hollandia (currently known as Jayapura), New Guinea, landing the commando parties and taking them back on board at night. She refueled at Manus Island on 27–28 March and sailed on for her assigned patrol area. This patrol was interrupted from 10 to 16 April, when Dace met at sea with Scamp and escorted her into Manus. On 13 May, Dace put into Brisbane, Australia, for refit.

Dace's fourth war patrol from 13 June to 12 August found her refueling at Manus on 20–21 June, and sailing on to patrol the Mindanao coast in Davao Gulf. Enemy contacts were made, but were too small to be worthwhile targets. On 9 July, Dace scored at least three hits on a large transport whose two escorts dropped a total of 43 depth charges, badly shaking the submarine, but causing little physical damage. A reconnaissance mission took her into Sarangani Bay on 16 July, and 10 days later, she pursued a smoke contact visible on the horizon for a full day, eight times being forced down to avoid detection by patrolling aircraft. That night, she re-established contact and just after midnight on 27 July, Dace launched an attack, firing 10 torpedoes into a convoy of three merchantmen, sinking the tanker Kyoei Maru No. 2 (1,157 tons) before being forced to dive when one of the escorts tried to ram and began a depth-charge attack. On 31 July, Dace sank a small freighter and the next day received another depth-charge volley after an attack on a well escorted freighter. With all torpedoes expended, Dace put in at Manus on 6 August and sailed on to Brisbane, arriving on 12 August.

Dace cleared Brisbane on 1 September on her fifth and most successful war patrol. She topped up her fuel tanks at Darwin, Australia, on 10 September, and sailed for the exacting task of sweeping mines in Palawan Passage and Balabac Strait. From 27 September to 3 October, she put in at Mios Woendi to repair her gyrocompass, returning to her patrol area on 10 October. Four days later, she attacked a convoy of seven ships, sinking two and heavily damaging a third.

She now joined Darter in an action that brought both submarines the Navy Unit Commendation. On 23 October, they contacted the Japanese Center Force approaching the Palawan Passage for the attack on the Leyte landings. Since the location of this Japanese force had been unknown for several days, the contact reported by Dace and Darter was significant. The two submarines closed the task force, and Darter attacked first, sinking Atago and damaging Takao. Dace followed with a torpedo attack that sank Maya, then went deep to avoid counterattacking destroyers. Continuing to track their target, hoping for a chance to finish off Takao, the two submarines worked through the Palawan Passage. Darter ran aground. With the area full of searching enemy ships, Dace took Darter's men off, then fired torpedoes at her to destroy her. She dove to avoid a patrolling Japanese aircraft, which had bombed Darter. Dace sailed on for Fremantle Harbour, Western Australia, arriving on 6 November.

Dace cleared Fremantle on 2 December on her sixth war patrol. She scouted along the Singapore-Hong Kong shipping lane, then sailed on to mine the channel between Palau Gambir and the mainland. Finishing that task on 16 December, Dace heard loud explosions from the mined area late in the afternoon. Three days later, while preparing to attack an eight-ship convoy, Dace was violently shaken by four depth charges or bombs. She went deep, hitting bottom, and while waiting there for the escorts to break off their attack, she was bumped, turned, scraped, and clanked along the bottom by the strong current. Somehow, the enemy did not detect her and the boat was able to surface later, repair minor damage, and sail on to patrol farther north. On 28 December, she sank Nosaki and damaged a freighter in the same convoy. She put in at Saipan for fuel on 17 January 1945, and reached Pearl Harbor on 28 January.

===== 1945 =====
After a West Coast overhaul, Dace sailed from Pearl Harbor on 25 May 1945 on her seventh war patrol. She fueled at Midway on 29 May, and entered her patrol area in the Kurile Islands on 7 June. At battle stations, she surfaced and fired on two Japanese ships, one Luger and one sea truck, both sunk through gun action on 8 June. The next day, two Japanese ships again were taken out, a freighter and a destroyer. She then sank two sailing ships by gunfire, then headed into the Sea of Okhotsk. On 10 June, she detected a large freighter and a small tanker sailing through the fog. Coming into attacking position, Dace saw the convoy also included three escorts, but continued to close on the freighter, firing her first spread at only 380 yd (350 m). She swung to fire at the tanker as the freighter, Hakuyo Maru (1,391 GRT), exploded and sank, then was confronted by an escort apparently planning to ram. Dace launched a torpedo "down the throat" of the escort, and plunged deep. A severe depth-charge attack followed, after which Dace fired again at the escort. She returned to Midway on 25 July and sailed on to Saipan on 13 August, preparing for her eighth war patrol. She was there when the war ended.

==== Post-war ====
With the end of hostilities, Dace was ordered back to Pearl Harbor, and on 5 October 1945, arrived at New London. She was placed in commission in reserve at Portsmouth Naval Shipyard on 15 January 1946, and was towed to New London, where she was placed out of commission in reserve on 12 February 1947.

Recommissioned on 8 August 1951, Dace operated from New London along the Eastern Seaboard and in the Caribbean Sea until placed in commission in reserve at New London on 31 December 1953. She was placed out of commission in reserve at Portsmouth Naval Shipyard on 15 January 1954 for extensive modernization, then was recommissioned on 22 October 1954. After training men of the Marina Militare Italiana, she was decommissioned at New London on 31 January 1955, and transferred the same day to Italy under the Military Assistance Program.

== Leonardo da Vinci (S 510) ==
The former Dace was commissioned in the Marina Militare Italiana (Italian Navy) as Leonardo da Vinci (S 510). Originally to be lent to Italy for five years, this arrangement was extended by five years in 1959 and extended for yet another five years, twice. Together with Enrico Tazzoli (ex-USS Barb), Leonardo da Vinci formed the backbone of Italian submarine strength in the late 1950s and 1960s. Dace was stricken from the Naval Vessel Register on 15 October 1972 and returned to the United States Navy; Leonardo da Vinci was deleted from the Italian Navy the following year.

=== Fate ===
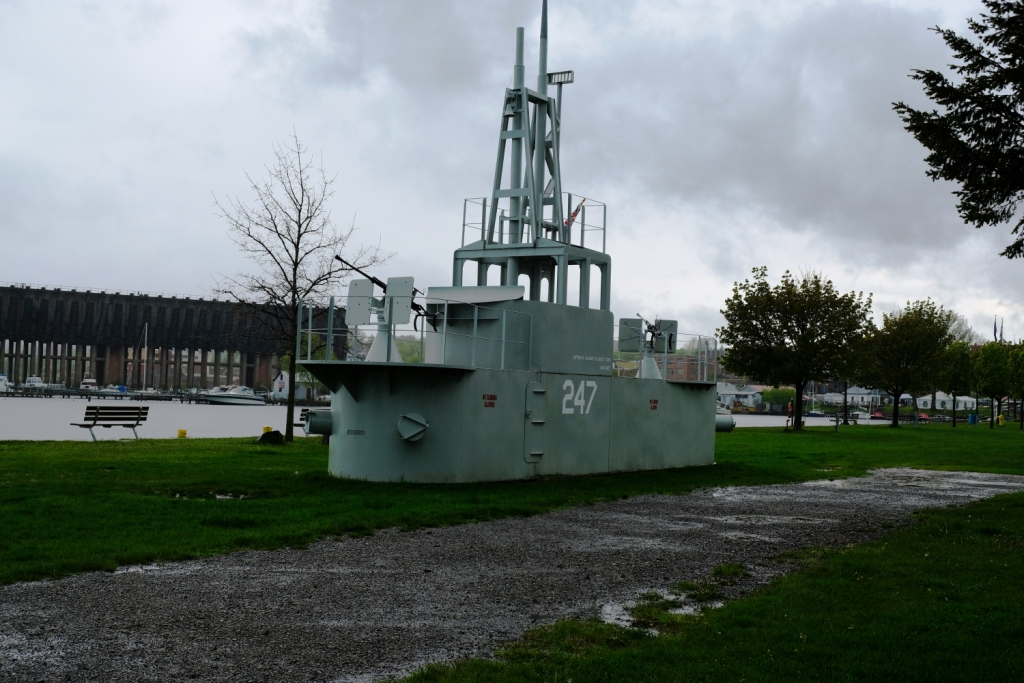
The only relic left of Dace, now located at Ellwood A Mattson Lower Harbor Park, Marquette, Michigan

Ex-Dace was sold for scrapping on 1 April 1975.

== Awards ==
In addition to the Navy Unit Commendation, Dace received seven battle stars during her seven war patrols, the last five of which were designated as "successful". She is credited with having sunk 28,689 tons of Japanese shipping.
