= Japanese submarine chaser CH-15 =

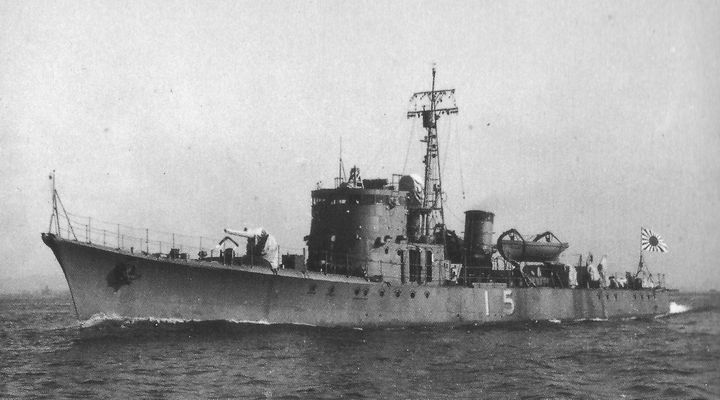
- CH-15 in 1941

History

Empire of Japan
- Name: CH-15
- Builder: Osaka Iron Works, Sakurajima
- Laid down: 26 August 1940
- Launched: 23 December 1940
- Completed: 31 March 1941
- Commissioned: 31 March 1941
- Decommissioned: 30 November 1945
- Fate: Sold for scrap, 23 April 1948

General characteristics
- Class & type: No.13-class submarine chaser
- Displacement: 438 long tons (445 t) standard
- Length: 51 m (167 ft 4 in) o/a
- Beam: 6.7 m (22 ft 0 in)
- Draught: 2.75 m (9 ft 0 in)
- Propulsion: 2 × Kampon Mk.23A Model 8 diesels, 2 shafts, 1,700 bhp (1,268 kW)
- Speed: 16 knots (30 km/h; 18 mph)
- Range: 2,000 nmi (3,700 km) at 14 kn (26 km/h; 16 mph)
- Complement: 68
- Sensors & processing systems: 1 × Type 93 active sonar; 1 × Type 93 hydrophone
- Armament: 1 × 76.2 mm (3 in) L/40 AA gun; 2 × Type 93 13.2 mm (0.52 in) AA guns; 36 × Type 95 depth charges; 2 × Type 94 depth charge projectors; 1 × depth charge thrower

CH-15 was a No.13-class submarine chaser of the Imperial Japanese Navy during World War II.

== History ==
CH-15 was laid down by Osaka Iron Works at its Sakurajima shipyard on 26 August 1940, launched on 23 December 1940, and completed and commissioned on 31 March 1941. On 1 November 1946, she was designated a special cargo ship in the Allied Repatriation Service but never assumed duty due to the need for repairs. CH-15 was struck from the Navy List on 30 November 1945 and sold for scrap on 23 April 1948.

== Additional references ==
- "Escort Vessels of the Imperial Japanese Navy special issue". Ships of the World (in Japanese). Vol. 45. Kaijinsha. February 1996.
- Model Art Extra No.340, Drawings of Imperial Japanese Naval Vessels Part-1 (in Japanese). Model Art Co. Ltd. October 1989.
- The Maru Special, Japanese Naval Vessels No.49, Japanese submarine chasers and patrol boats (in Japanese). Ushio Shobō. March 1981.
