= USS R-16 =

R-class submarine of the United States

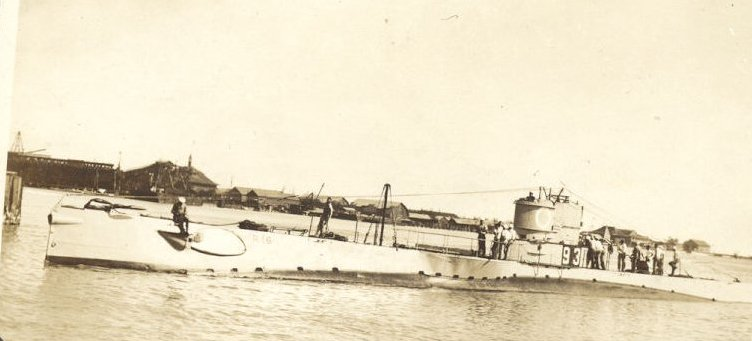
- USS R-16 returning to Pearl Harbor, Territory of Hawaii, sometime between 1919 and 1930, note the large white "O" painted on the submarine's fairwater for recognition

History

United States
- Name: R-16
- Ordered: 29 August 1916
- Builder: Union Iron Works, San Francisco, California
- Cost: $818,237.53 (hull and machinery)
- Laid down: 26 April 1917
- Launched: 15 December 1917
- Sponsored by: Mrs. Alice Wilson
- Commissioned: 5 August 1918
- Decommissioned: 12 May 1931
- Recommissioned: 1 July 1940
- Decommissioned: 16 July 1945
- Stricken: 25 July 1945
- Identification: Hull symbol: SS-93 (17 July 1920); Call sign: NASX
- Fate: Sold for scrapping, 22 January 1946

General characteristics
- Class & type: R-1-class submarine
- Displacement: 574 long tons (583 t) surfaced; 685 long tons (696 t) submerged
- Length: 186 feet 3 inches (56.77 m)
- Beam: 18 ft (5.5 m)
- Draft: 15 ft 6 in (4.72 m)
- Installed power: 880 brake horsepower (656 kW) diesel; 934 hp (696 kW) electric
- Propulsion: 2 × NELSECO 6-EB-14 diesel engines; 2 × Electro-Dynamic Company electric motors; 2 × 60-cell batteries; 2 × Propellers
- Speed: 12.5 knots (23.2 km/h; 14.4 mph) surfaced; 9.3 kn (17.2 km/h; 10.7 mph) submerged
- Range: 4,700 nautical miles (8,700 km; 5,400 mi) at 6.2 kn (11.5 km/h; 7.1 mph), 7,000 nmi (13,000 km; 8,100 mi) if fuel loaded into the main ballast tanks
- Test depth: 200 ft (61 m)
- Capacity: 18,880 US gallons (71,500 L; 15,720 imp gal) fuel
- Complement: 2 officers; 27 enlisted
- Armament: 4 × 21-inch (533 mm) torpedo tubes (8 torpedoes); 1 × 3-inch (76 mm)/50-caliber deck gun

USS R-16 (SS-93), also known as "Submarine No. 93", was an R-1-class coastal and harbor defense submarines of the United States Navy commissioned before the end of World War I.

== Design ==
The R-boats built by the Fore River Shipbuilding Company, R-1 through R-14, and the Union Iron Works, R-15 through R-20, are sometimes considered a separate class, R-1-class, from those built by the Lake Torpedo Boat Company, R-21 through R-27, R-21-class.

The submarines had a length of 186 feet 3 inches (56.8 m) overall, a beam of 18 ft (5.5 m), and a mean draft of 15 ft 6 in (4.7 m). They displaced 574 long tons (583 t) on the surface and 685 long tons (696 t) submerged. The R-1-class submarines had a crew of 2 officers and 27 enlisted men. They had a diving depth of 200 ft (61.0 m).

For surface running, the boats were powered by two 440-brake-horsepower (328 kW) NELSECO 6-EB-14 diesel engines, each driving one propeller shaft. When submerged each propeller was driven by a 467-horsepower (348 kW) Electro-Dynamic Company electric motor. They could reach 12.5 knots (23.2 km/h; 14.4 mph) on the surface and 9.3 kn (17.2 km/h; 10.7 mph) underwater. On the surface, the R-1-class had a range of 4,700 nautical miles (8,700 km; 5,400 mi) at 6.2 kn (11.5 km/h; 7.1 mph), or 7,000 nmi (13,000 km; 8,100 mi) if fuel was loaded into their main ballast tanks.

The boats were armed with four 21-inch (533 mm) torpedo tubes in the bow. They carried four reloads, for a total of eight torpedoes. The R-1-class submarines were also armed with a single 3 in (76 mm)/50 caliber deck gun.

== Construction ==
R-16's keel was laid down by the Union Iron Works, in San Francisco, California, on 26 April 1917. She was launched on 15 December 1917, sponsored by Mrs. Alice Wilson, and commissioned on 5 August 1918.

== Service history ==
=== 1919–1931 ===
Following commissioning, R-16 proceeded to Balboa, in the Panama Canal Zone, whence she conducted patrols until December 1918. Then ordered back to California, she remained on the West Coast into June 1919. On 17 June 1919, she got underway from San Francisco, and on 25 June 1919, arrived at Pearl Harbor, in the Territory of Hawaii.

When the US Navy adopted its hull classification system on 17 July 1920, she received the hull number SS-93.

R-16 operated with fleet units for the next 11 years.

R-16 departed Pearl Harbor, on 12 December 1930, and after transiting the Panama Canal, proceeded to the Philadelphia Navy Yard, where she decommissioned on 12 May 1931. She was Reserve Fleet for the next nine years.

=== 1940–1946 ===
R-16 recommissioned on 1 July 1940, and by the end of 1940, had again assumed patrol duties in waters off Panama. Ordered back to the East Coast in the fall of 1941, she arrived at Key West, Florida, on 9 December 1941, two days after the Japanese attack on Pearl Harbor which brought the United States into World War II. By 18 December 1941, she was at New London, Connecticut, from which she conducted patrols and assisted in anti-submarine warfare training into February 1942.

R-16 shifted to the Virgin Islands, in March 1942, she continued her dual mission in the Caribbean Sea, operating from Saint Thomas, and from Trinidad.

On 7 December 1942, the United States Army transport USAT Florida mistook R-16 for a German U-boat and opened gunfire on her in the Caribbean Sea, but R-16 submerged and avoided damage.

On 1 March 1943, R-16 returned to New London. There she conducted operations for the submarine school, the sound laboratory, and destroyer and destroyer escort training units. Between 1 August 1943 and 20 March 1944, she operated from Bermuda, then returned to New London, for her last year of naval service.

== Fate ==
R-16 departed New London, for Philadelphia, on 4 July 1945. Arriving on 5 July 1945, she was decommissioned on 16 July 1945, and struck from the Naval Vessel Register on 25 July 1945. She was sold and delivered to the North American Smelting Company, in Philadelphia, in March 1946.

== Bibliography ==
- "Table 21 - Ships on Navy List June 30, 1919". Congressional Serial Set. U.S. Government Printing Office: 770. 1921.
- Friedman, Norman (1995). U.S. Submarines Through 1945: An Illustrated Design History. Annapolis, Maryland: Naval Institute Press. ISBN 1-55750-263-3.
- Priolo, Gary. "R-16 (SS-93)". Navsource.net.
- Gardiner, Robert & Gray, Randal (1985). Conway's All the World's Fighting Ships 1906–1921. Annapolis, Maryland: Naval Institute Press. ISBN 0-85177-245-5.
- "R-16". Dictionary of American Naval Fighting Ships. Navy Department, Naval History and Heritage Command. This article incorporates text from this source, which is in the public domain.
- Hall, Anne Martin (1925). Ships of the United States navy and their sponsors, 1913-1923.
- Hinman, Charles R.; Campbell, Douglas E. (2019). The Submarine Has No Friends: Friendly Fire Incidents Involving U.S. Submarines During World War II. Syneca Research Group, Inc. ISBN 978-0-359-76906-3.
