= HMS Tancred (W 104) =

Favourite-class tugboat of the Royal Navy

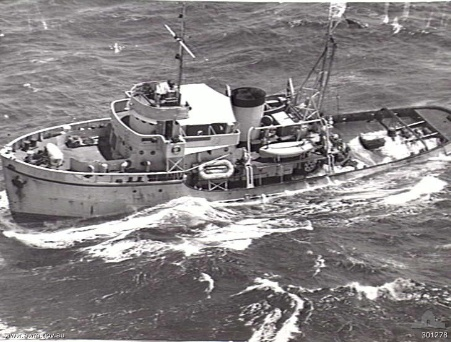
- Sister ship HMAS Reserve in 1951

History

United Kingdom
- Builder: Gulfport Boiler & Welding Works, Port Arthur, Texas
- Laid down: 3 September 1942
- Launched: 1 January 1943
- Fate: Transferred to Australia

Australia
- Owner: Commonwealth Marine Salvage Board (1944-19??); Department of Marine and Harbours, South Australia (19??-1983)
- Acquired: 2 September 1944
- Identification: IMO number: 5351947
- Fate: Broken up in 1983

General characteristics
- Displacement: 800 tons
- Length: 143 ft (44 m)
- Beam: 33 ft 1 in (10.08 m)
- Draught: 14 ft 7 in (4.45 m)
- Speed: 16 knots (30 km/h; 18 mph)

Tancred was a salvage rescue tugboat operated by the Royal Navy (RN) between 1943 and September 1944 before being transferred to Australia. She was broken up in 1983.

== Construction ==
She was laid down on 3 September 1942 by Gulfport Boiler & Welding Works, Port Arthur, Texas and launched on 1 January 1943

== Operational history ==
Commissioned as Tancred (W-104) under lend-lease on 18 February 1943 and served in the Atlantic Ocean. Transferred to Australia on 2 September 1944 she was operated by the Australian Commonwealth Marine Salvage Board until she returned to the custody of the United States Navy on 2 September 1945 and again retransferred back to Australia on the same day.

Tancred served until 2 August 1948, when she was again returned to the custody of the United States and was sold to Australia on 5 August 1948. She served with newly created Australian Salvage Board from 1949 and was later sold to the Department of Marine and Harbours, South Australia based at Port Adelaide.

== Fate ==
Tancred was broken up in 1983. Her wheelhouse is on display at the Port Adelaide Historical Society Museum, Peterhead.
