= Japanese cargo ship Hakuyo Maru (1942) =

History

Empire of Japan
- Name: Hakuyo Maru
- Builder: Ohara Shipbuilding & Steel Works, Osaka
- Launched: October 1942
- Sponsored by: Kyushu Yusen Co., Ltd., Fukuoka
- Completed: 1943
- Fate: Torpedoed and sunk, 10 June 1945

General characteristics
- Type: Cargo ship
- Tonnage: 1,391 GRT standard
- Length: 68.45 m (224 ft 7 in) o/a
- Beam: 10.67 m (35 ft 0 in)
- Draught: 6.25 m (20 ft 6 in)
- Installed power: 900 hp (671 kW)

Hakuyo Maru (Japanese: 白鷹丸) was a Japanese cargo ship of during World War II.

== History ==
She was launched October 1942 at the Osaka shipyard of Ohara Shipbuilding & Steel Works for the benefit of shipping company Kyushu Yusen Co., Ltd. (jp: 九州郵船), Fukuoka and completed in 1943.

On 10 June 1945, she was torpedoed and sunk by the submarine USS Dace in the Sea of Okhotsk, 120 miles (190 km) west of Simushir Island at 47°21′N 149°07′E.
