= Japanese cargo ship Hakuyo Maru (1944) =

Osaka shipyard of Namura Shipbuilding Co., Ltd

History

Empire of Japan
- Name: Hakuyo Maru
- Builder: Namura Shipbuilding Co., Ltd., Osaka
- Laid down: 1944
- Launched: 9 September 1944
- Sponsored by: Toyo Kisen Kaisha Co., Ltd, Tokyo
- Completed: 6 October 1944
- Identification: 53461
- Fate: Sunk, 12 June 1945
- Notes: Call sign: JGXW

General characteristics
- Type: Cargo ship
- Tonnage: 2,300 GRT standard
- Length: 85.00 m (278 ft 10 in) o/a
- Beam: 13.40 m (44 ft 0 in)
- Draught: 7.20 m (23 ft 7 in)
- Installed power: 900 hp (671 kW)
- Speed: 11 knots (20 km/h; 13 mph)

Hakuyo Maru (Japanese: 白鷹丸) was a Japanese cargo ship of during World War II.

== History ==
She was laid down in 1944 at the Osaka shipyard of Namura Shipbuilding Co., Ltd., for the benefit of Toyo Kisen Kaisha Co., Ltd., Tokyo. She was one of 92 Wartime Standard Type D cargo ships laid down in 1944–1945 and one of nine built by Namura Shipbuilding, seven of which were completed prior to the end of the war. Other Type D cargo ships built by Namura were Noto Maru (能登丸), Kaga Maru (加賀丸), Shinei Maru No.3 (第三神影丸), Echizen Maru (越前丸), Himi Maru (日見丸), Goshun Maru (五春丸), Nansei Maru (南征丸), and Nanyo Maru (南陽丸). She was launched on 9 September 1944 and completed on 6 October 1944. On 12 June 1945, she was lost in a maritime incident in dense fog in the Tsugaru Strait.
