= Commonwealth Marine Salvage Board =

Australian government board

The Commonwealth Marine Salvage Board, also known as the Australian Salvage Board, was an Australian government authority over maritime salvage during the Second World War.

The board was established on 14 March 1942, based in Sydney and during the boards existence salvaged 83 out of the 86 vessels where salvage was attempted. The Board was abolished on 1 January 1946 with the Australian Shipping Board being established.
