= RV (disambiguation) =

An RV is a recreational vehicle, a motorhome.

RV or Rv may also refer to:

== Arts, entertainment, and media ==
- RV (film), a 2006 comedy film starring Robin Williams
- RV (rapper), a British rapper from London
- Radio Vaticana (Vatican Radio), the official broadcasting service of the Vatican
- Re-Volt, a radio controlled car race game
- Red Velvet, a South Korean girl group
- Roma Victor, an online role-playing game based on the Roman Empire in the latter half of the 2nd century
- Ryom-Verzeichnis, a partial catalog of the music of Antonio Vivaldi, created by Peter Ryom
- "RV", a song by Faith No More from their 1992 album Angel Dust

== Organisations ==
- R. V. College of Engineering, located in Bangalore, India
- Red Electoral Alliance (Rød Valgallianse or Raud Valallianse), a former political party in Norway
- Danish Social Liberal Party (Radikale Venstre), a political party in Denmark

== Places ==
- Revenue Village, a type of small administrative region in India
- Rift Valley Province, in Kenya
- Rožňava, Slovakia (car plate registration identifier RV)

== Science, technology, and mathematics ==
- Random variable, in probability and statistics
- Radial velocity, the velocity of an object in the direction of the line of sight
- RealVideo, a video format developed by RealNetworks
- Residual volume, the volume of air remaining in the respiratory system after maximal expiration; see lung volumes
- Rotational velocity, an angular speed
- Variable resistor, an abbreviation used in electronic circuit schematics
- Rotavirus, the most common cause of diarrhoeal disease among infants and young children
- RISC-V, an open standard instruction set architecture

== Transport ==
=== Vehicles ===
- Re-entry vehicle, a space vehicle intended to enter an atmosphere
- Research vessel, a ship primarily constructed to carry out scientific research at sea

=== Other uses in transport ===
- Air Canada Rouge, a wholly owned subsidiary of Air Canada, by IATA airline code
- Norwegian national road, used for labeling routes in Norway
- Rahway Valley Railroad, a railroad in the United States
- Van's Aircraft, an American manufacturer of kit aircraft

== Other uses ==
- Registered voters, in political polls
- Relative value (economics), a measure of corporate financial health relative to other companies
- Remote viewing, a paranormal ability
- Revised Version, a Bible edition
- Rigveda, first sacred canonical text of Hinduism

== See also ==
- R5 (disambiguation)
- Rendezvous (disambiguation), the anglicisation of the French word rendez-vous, meaning "appointment", is sometimes abbreviated as rv
