= Dudley W. Morton =

United States Navy submarine commander (1907–1943)

Dudley Walker Morton
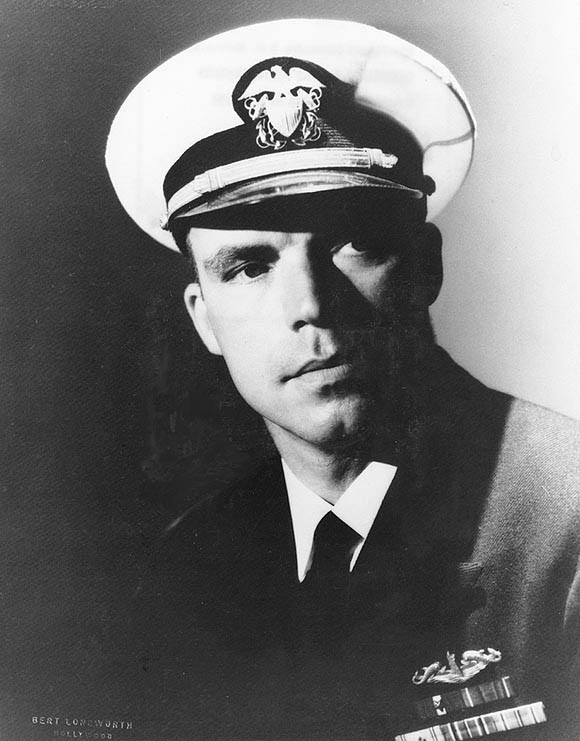
- Commander Dudley "Mush" Morton
- Born: July 17, 1907; Owensboro, Kentucky, U.S.
- Died: October 11, 1943 (aged 36); La Pérouse Strait
- Military career
- Allegiance: United States
- Branch: United States Navy
- Service years: 1927–1943
- Rank: Commander
- Nickname: Mush
- Commands: USS Wahoo (SS-238); USS Dolphin (SS-169); USS R-5 (SS-82)
- Conflicts: World War II
- Awards: Navy Cross (4); Distinguished Service Cross; Purple Heart

Dudley Walker Morton (July 17, 1907 – October 11, 1943), nicknamed "Mushmouth" or "Mush", was a submarine commander of the United States Navy during World War II. He was commander of the USS Wahoo (SS-238) during its third through seventh patrols. Wahoo was one of the most-celebrated submarines of World War II, as it sank at least 19 Japanese ships, more than any other submarine of the time. Morton and Wahoo disappeared in 1943 during a transit of La Pérouse Strait. He was legally declared deceased three years later.

== Early life ==
Morton was born in Owensboro, Kentucky, on July 17, 1907. He graduated from the United States Naval Academy in 1930. There he received the nickname "Mushmouth", after a character in the cartoon strip Moon Mullins whose large square jaw and prominent mouth resembled Morton's. The nickname was shortened to "Mush", by which he was known for much of his life. One of his classmates was Lance Edward Massey.

== Naval career ==
Prior to the outbreak of World War II, Morton served on the USS Saratoga (CV-3), USS Chicago (CA-29), USS Canopus (AS-9), USS Fairfax (DD-93), and the submarines USS S-37 (SS-142) and USS R-5 (SS-82), which he commanded from August 19, 1940, to April 23, 1942. Morton was promoted to lieutenant commander on October 15, 1942, and was in nominal command of USS Dolphin (SS-169) while it underwent extended repairs at Pearl Harbor. He was relieved to make a war patrol in USS Wahoo (SS-238) between November 8 and December 26 as prospective commanding officer, a supernumerary position to prepare him for command of a fleet boat. Morton took command of Wahoo on December 31 in Brisbane, Australia. Between January 26, 1943, and October 11, he carried out four offensive patrols, during which Wahoo was responsible for sinking 19 cargo and transport ships for a combined total of 55,000 tons.

=== Buyo Maru incident ===
During Wahoo's third war patrol, Morton was responsible for an incident which resulted in shipwrecked soldiers in about twenty lifeboats of sunken Japanese transport Buyo Maru being fired on while in the water. The transport was torpedoed by Wahoo on 26 January 1943. Morton was responsible for ordering the machine gunning of the shipwrecked survivors in the water. Morton and his executive officer, Richard O'Kane, had misidentified the survivors as solely Japanese. In fact, they were mainly Indian POWs of 2nd Battalion, 16th Punjab Regiment, plus escorting forces from the Japanese 26th Field Ordnance Depot.

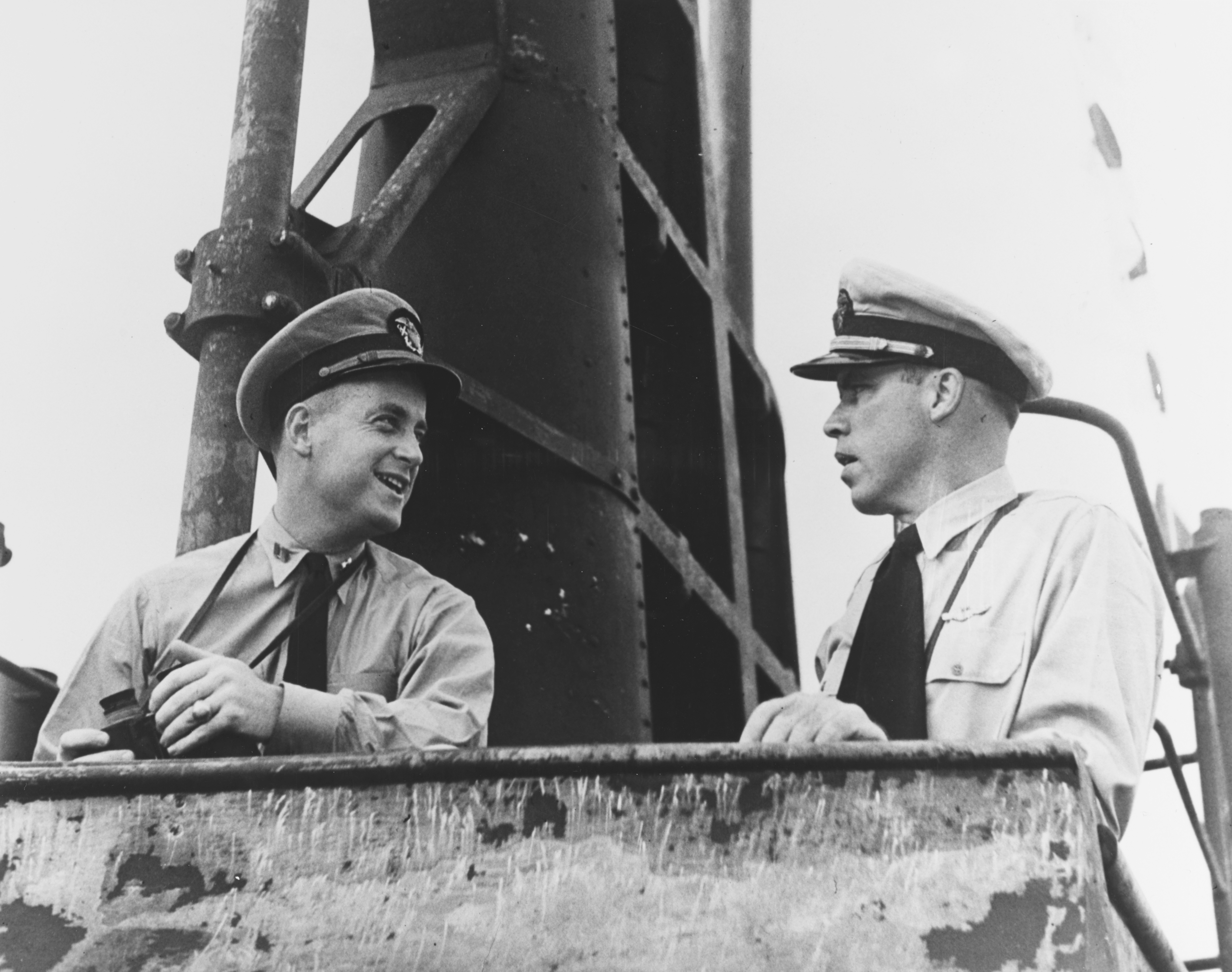
Morton (right) speaks with his executive officer, Richard O'Kane on the bridge of the Wahoo ca. February 7, 1943

O'Kane's account describes Morton explaining that he should prevent enemy troops from getting ashore to fight again - as each one of them could cost an American life. However, the Hague Convention of 1907 bans the ill-treatment of shipwreck survivors. O'Kane further explained that the fire from Wahoo was intended to force the troops to abandon their boats and no troops were deliberately targeted. Vice Admiral Charles A. Lockwood, the Commander of the Submarine Force for the U.S. Pacific Fleet (COMSUBPAC) asserted that the survivors were army troops and turned machinegun and rifle fire on Wahoo while she maneuvered on the surface. He further stated that such resistance was common in submarine warfare. In 1975, historian Clay Blair claimed Morton opened fire first and the shipwrecked returned fire with handguns.

=== Disappearance ===
After three arduous war patrols, Morton was given the highly dangerous assignment of penetrating the Sea of Japan for the second time, in October 1943. Morton was reported missing in action that December, when his submarine was presumed lost. After the war, it was determined from Japanese records that, on October 11, in the time frame in which the Wahoo was expected to exit through La Pérouse Strait, an antisubmarine aircraft found a surfaced submarine and attacked, dropping three depth charges.

Declared deceased on January 7, 1946, Morton's decorations included the Navy Cross with three gold stars in lieu of a second, third, and fourth awards, and the Army Distinguished Service Cross. O'Kane believed the Buyo Maru POW shootings prevented Morton from being awarded the Medal of Honor. The destroyer USS Morton (DD-948) was named in his honor.

== Summary of war patrols ==
With six war patrols, Morton ranked third among the Navy's top skippers, credited with 19 ships and 54,683 tons sunk, per JANAC (alternatively recorded as 17 ships/100,400 tons, per Blair)

Summary of CDR Dudley W. Morton's USS R-5 (SS-82) and USS Wahoo (SS-238) War Patrols
	Departing From	Date	Days	Wartime Credit Ships/Tonnage	JANAC Credit Ships/Tonnage	Patrol Area
R-5-1	Atlantic	1942	?	zero/zero	zero/zero	Atlantic
Wahoo-3	Brisbane, Australia	January 1943	23	5/31,900	3/11,348	Pearl Harbor
Wahoo-4	Pearl Harbor, TH	February 1943	42	8/36,700	9/19,530	East China Sea
Wahoo-5	Pearl Harbor, TH	April 1943	26	3/24,700	3/10,376	Empire
Wahoo-6	Pearl Harbor, TH	August 1943	27	zero/zero	zero/zero	Empire
Wahoo-7	Pearl Harbor, TH	September 1943	lost	1/7,100	4/13,429	Empire

== In popular culture ==
In 1960, Vice Admiral Charles A. Lockwood, Jr., ComSubPac during World War II, was asked to write the foreword for former Wahoo crewmember Forest Sterling's book, Wake of the Wahoo. He wrote about Morton: "When a natural leader and born daredevil such as Mush Morton is given command of a submarine, the result can only be a fighting ship of the highest order, with officers and men who would follow their skipper to the Gates of Hell... And they did." Added Lockwood: "Morton lined up an impressive number of 'firsts' during the short ten months that he commanded Wahoo: first to penetrate an enemy harbor and sink a ship therein; first to use successfully a down the throat shot; and first to wipe out an entire convoy single-handed."

In Herman Wouk's novel War and Remembrance, and the mini-series based on it, the Buyo Maru incident is prominently fictionalized as a scene for a major character's development.

== Awards and decorations ==

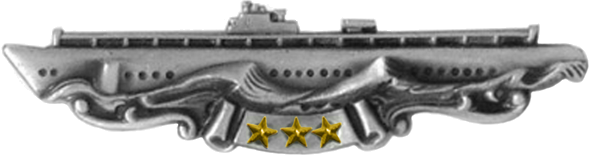

Submarine Warfare insignia
Navy Cross w/ three 5/16" Gold Stars		Distinguished Service Cross
Purple Heart	Navy Presidential Unit Citation	American Defense Service Medal w/ Fleet Clasp (3/16" Bronze Star)
American Campaign Medal	Asiatic-Pacific Campaign Medal w/ one 3/16" Silver Star	World War II Victory Medal
Submarine Combat Patrol insignia
