= Down the throat =

American World War II submarine term

In United States World War II military terminology, a submarine's torpedo aimed at a directly approaching vessel was said to be aimed down the throat. This 0-degree bow angle (AOB) was usually used against destroyers or other craft attacking the submarine.

A "down the throat" shot would be any shot in which the target craft was heading straight toward the submarine. These were extremely difficult torpedo attacks, and usually only skilled or desperate boat skippers attempted them. Further complications with the "down the throat" shot were the gyroscope issues that plagued US torpedoes, and the rapidly decreasing range of the target that could prevent arming of the torpedo.

It was first used by an American submarine, unsuccessfully, by Pompano (SS-181) under the command of Lieutenant Commander Lew Parks during the boat's first war patrol. Its first successful American use was by Dudley W. Morton, while in command of the USS Wahoo (SS-238), according to the foreword written by Vice Admiral Charles A. Lockwood Jr. in "Wake of the Wahoo", by Forrest Sterling.

During its last patrol, Harder (SS-257) sank an attacking Japanese destroyer with such a shot. Harder's captain, Commander Samuel David Dealey, was awarded a posthumous Medal of Honor for the patrol. Another Medal of Honor was awarded to the captain of Parche (SS-384), Lawson P. Ramage for a similar shot on a patrol that returned.

Another submarine, which did not return from a patrol but was known to have used a "down-the-throat" shot was Gudgeon (SS-211).
