= RV2 =

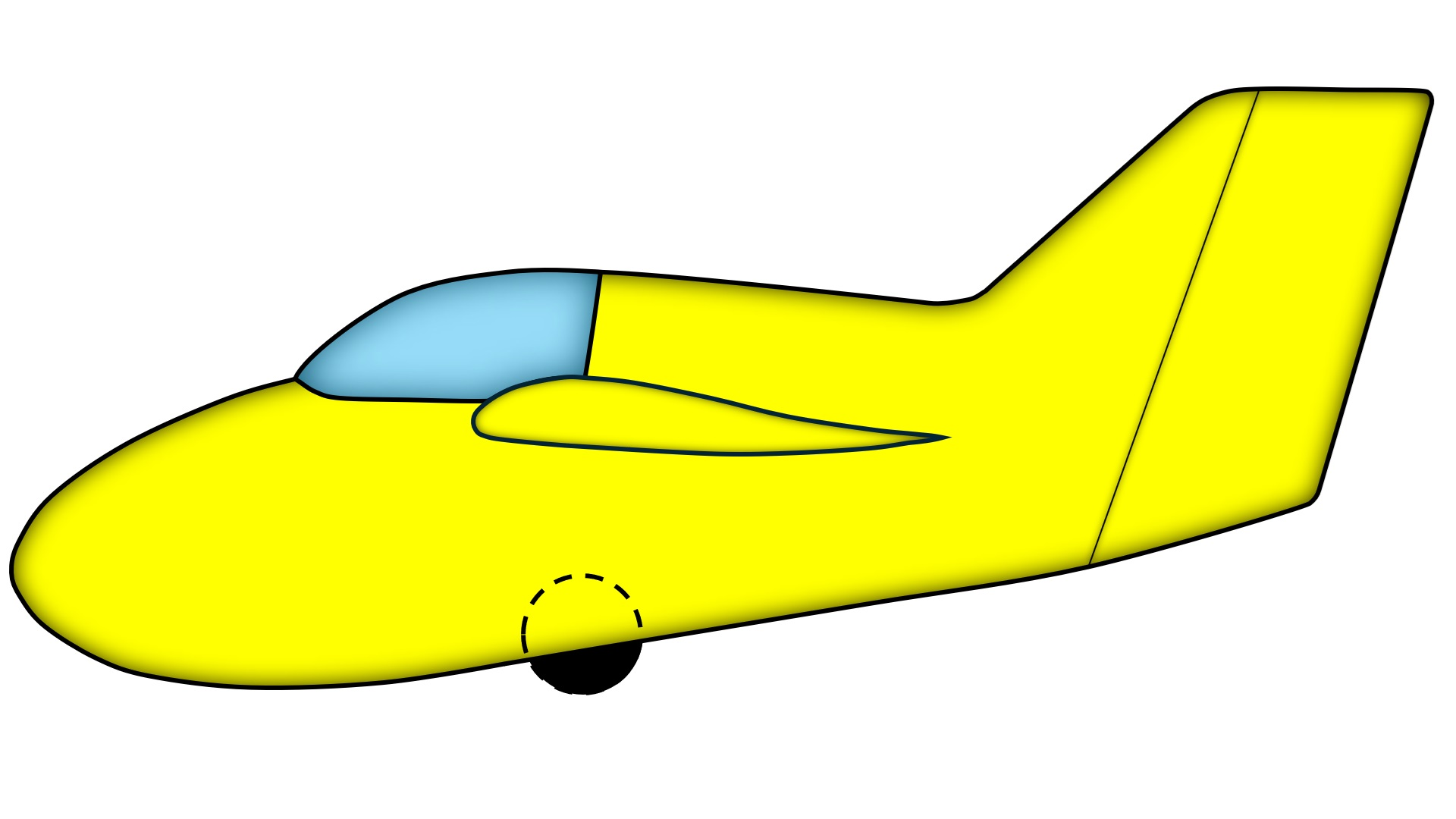
VanGrunsven RV-2 glider

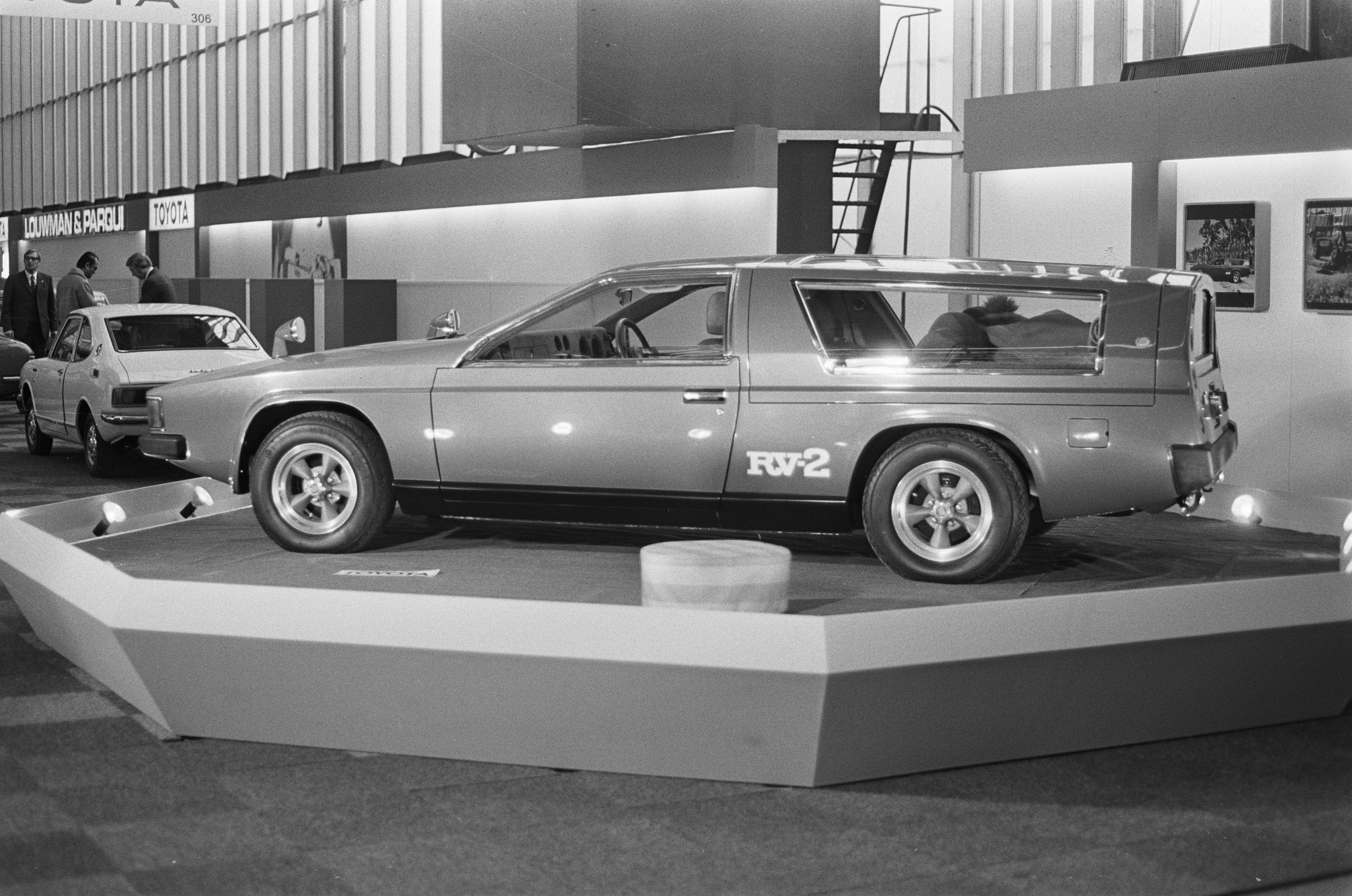
Toyota RV-2 concept car

RV2 may refer to:

- Mandala 2, the second mandala of the Rigveda
- Toyota RV-2, a concept car
- VanGrunsven RV-2, an unfinished glider prototype
- Red Victor 2, a heavily modified Vauxhall Victor
- RV2, an announced overhaul of the Roma Victor client
- RV2- Ryan Villopoto, number 2 in motocross & super cross
