= USS Wahoo (SS-238) =

Submarine of the United States

Coordinates: 45.8065°N 142.0605°E

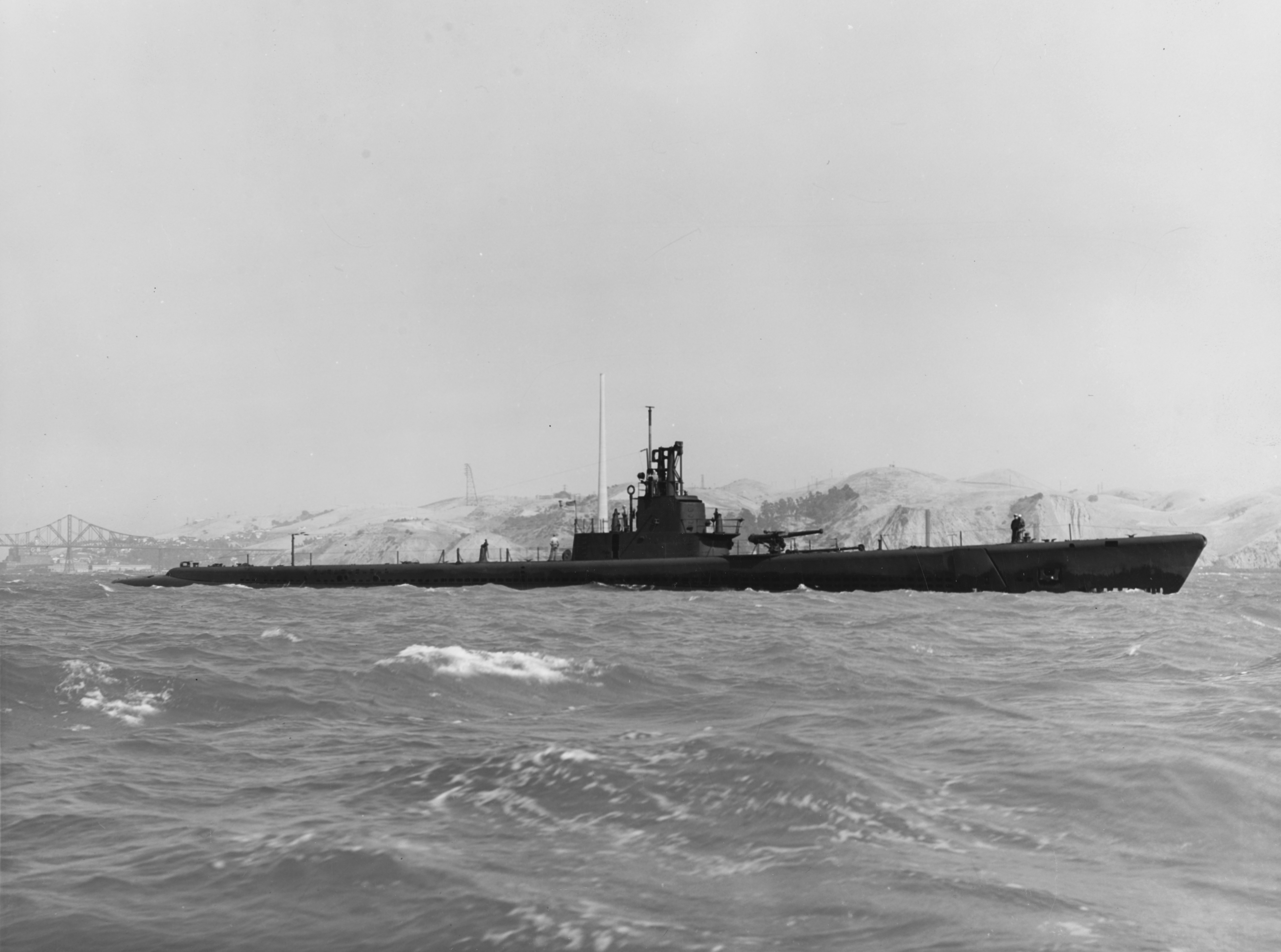
- USS Wahoo off Mare Island Naval Shipyard (July 1943)

History

United States
- Name: Wahoo
- Builder: Mare Island Naval Shipyard
- Laid down: 28 June 1941
- Launched: 14 February 1942
- Sponsored by: Mrs. William C. Barker, Jr.
- Commissioned: 15 May 1942
- Stricken: 6 December 1943
- Fate: Sunk by Japanese ships and aircraft in La Pérouse Strait, 11 October 1943

General characteristics
- Class & type: Gato-class diesel-electric submarine
- Displacement: 1,525 long tons (1,549 t) surfaced; 2,424 long tons (2,463 t) submerged
- Length: 311 ft 9 in (95.02 m)
- Beam: 27 ft 3 in (8.31 m)
- Draft: 17 ft (5.2 m) maximum
- Propulsion: 4 × Fairbanks-Morse Model 38D8-1/8 10-cylinder opposed piston diesel engines driving electrical generators; 2 × 126-cell Sargo batteries; 4 × high-speed General Electric electric motors with reduction gears; two propellers; 5,400 shp (4.0 MW) surfaced; 2,740 shp (2.0 MW) submerged
- Speed: 21 kn (24 mph; 39 km/h) surfaced; 9 kn (10 mph; 17 km/h) submerged
- Range: 11,000 nmi (13,000 mi; 20,000 km) surfaced at 10 kn (12 mph; 19 km/h)
- Endurance: 48 hours at 2 kn (2 mph; 4 km/h) submerged; 75 days on patrol
- Test depth: 300 ft (90 m)
- Complement: 6 officers, 54 enlisted
- Armament: 10 × 21 in (533 mm) torpedo tubes; (six forward, four aft; 24 Mark 14 torpedoes; 1 × 3 in (76 mm) / 50 caliber deck gun; Bofors 40 mm and Oerlikon 20 mm cannon

USS Wahoo (SS-238) was a Gato-class submarine, the first United States Navy ship to be named for the wahoo. Construction started before the U.S. entered World War II, and she was commissioned after entry. Wahoo was assigned to the Pacific theatre. She gained fame as an aggressive and highly successful submarine after Lieutenant Commander Dudley Walker "Mush" Morton became her skipper. She was sunk by Japanese aircraft in October 1943 while returning home from a patrol in the Sea of Japan.

== Construction ==
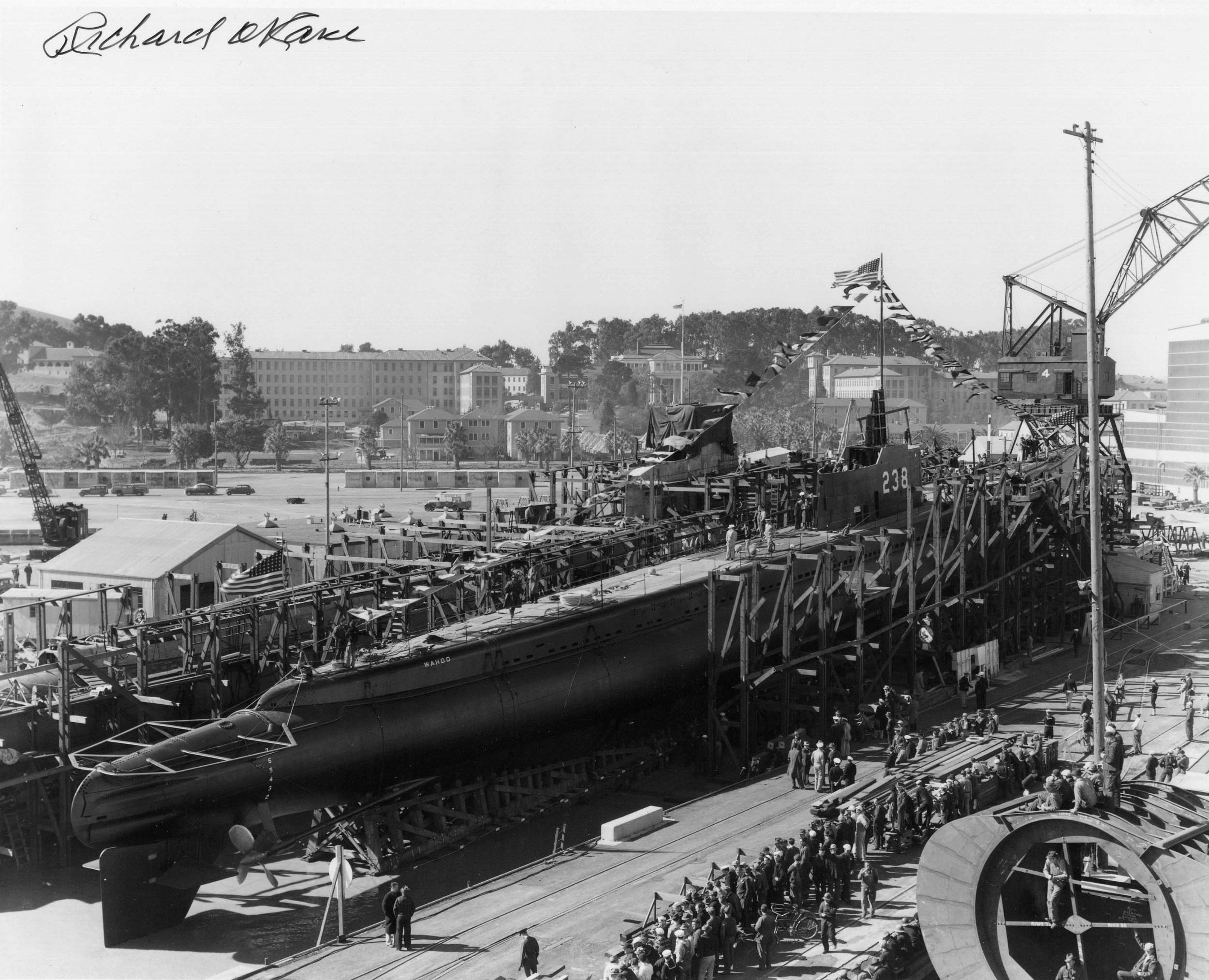
Wahoo prior to launching. Notice signature of Richard O'Kane, who was her executive officer at the time

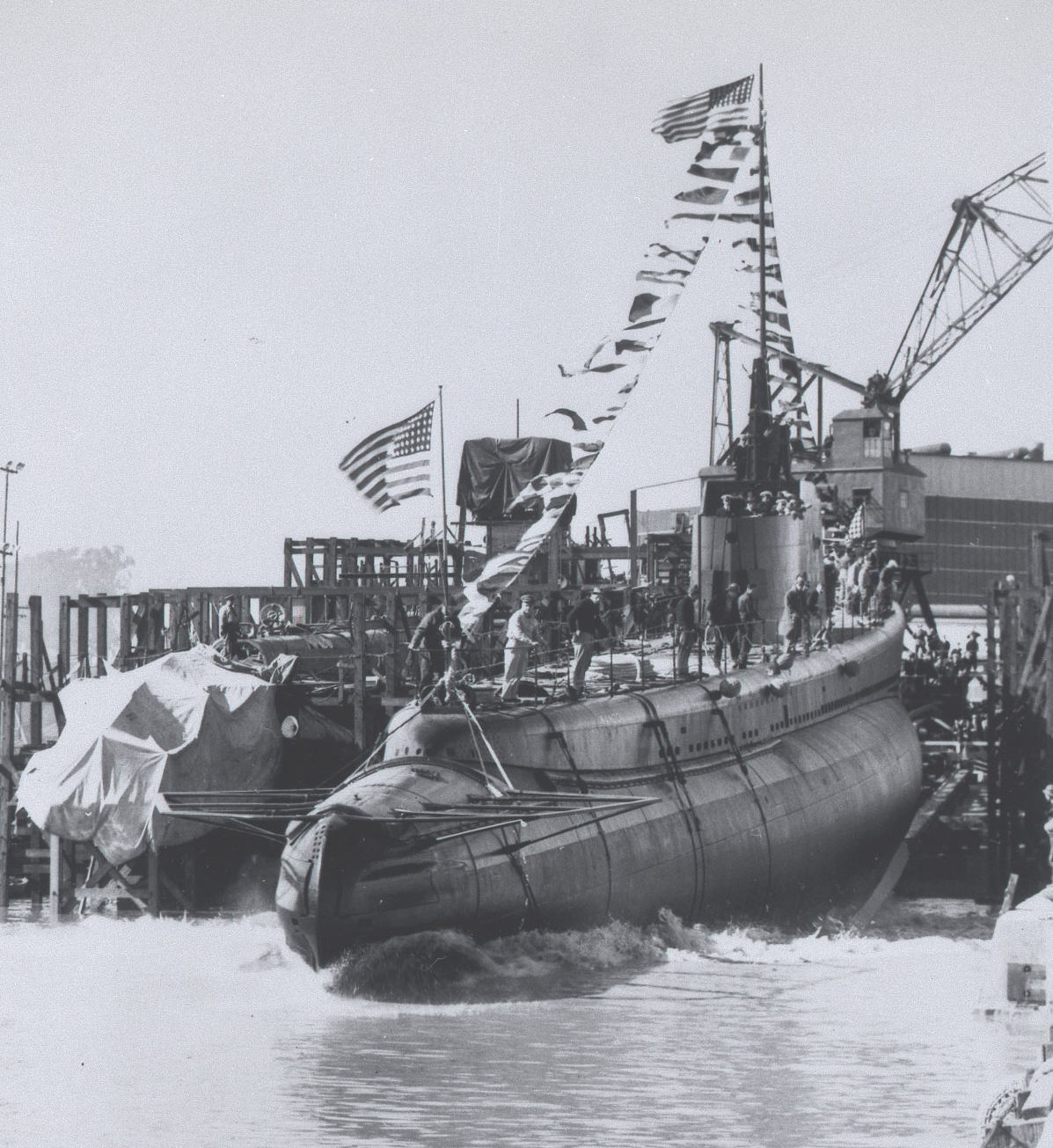
Launching

Wahoo's keel was laid down 28 June 1941 at the Mare Island Navy Yard, Vallejo, California. She was launched on 14 February 1942 (sponsored by Mrs. William C. Barker Jr.), and commissioned on 15 May 1942 with Lieutenant Commander (LCDR) Marvin G. "Pinky" Kennedy (class of 1929) in command. Lieutenant Richard O'Kane joined the precommissioning crew and served as her executive officer on five war patrols under Kennedy and Morton (O'Kane later received a Medal of Honor for his service in USS Tang).

Following fitting out and initial training along the California coast (which took her as far south as San Diego), Wahoo departed Mare Island on 12 August for Hawaii. She arrived at Pearl Harbor on 18 August and underwent exercise training until 21 August.

== First patrol, August – October 1942 ==
On 23 August 1942, Wahoo got underway for her first war patrol, seeking Japanese shipping in waters west of Truk, particularly in the area between the Hall Islands and the Namonuito Atoll. On 6 September, her third day in the area, Wahoo fired three Mark 14 torpedoes at her first target, a lone freighter; all missed, and the ship turned toward Wahoo, apparently with the intent to ram. The submarine dodged, fearful of counterattack from the air.

She continued to patrol the Truk area until 20 September, when she left the southwest part of the patrol area to explore south of the Namonuito Atoll. Under a bright moon and clear sky, the submarine sighted a freighter and her escort. Wahoo fired three torpedoes; all missed. A fourth hit the target, which was thought to take a port list and settled by the stern. Four minutes later, a series of three underwater explosions wracked the freighter. Wahoo was chased by the escort, but escaped by radically changing course in a rain squall. Though credited at the time with a freighter of 6,400 long tons (6,503 t), postwar analysis of Japanese shipping records by JANAC showed no sinking at this time or place.

Wahoo continued her patrol and sighted several airplanes, a patrol boat, and a tender, but was unable to close on any possible targets. On 1 October 1942, the submarine extended her patrol to Ulul Island, where she sighted several fishing boats. Within the next few days, Wahoo missed two of her best targets of the war. The first was Chiyoda (listed as a seaplane tender, she was in fact a mother ship to midget submarines), sailing without escort; Wahoo proved unable to reach a firing position. On 5 October, she sighted an aircraft carrier, believed to be Ryūjō, escorted by two destroyers. (In fact, Ryūjō had been sunk six weeks earlier in the Solomon Islands). Due to an approach lacking aggressiveness and skill, the target sailed away untouched. Two days later, Wahoo departed the patrol area. On 16 October, she made rendezvous with her escort and proceeded to Pearl Harbor, where she ended her first patrol on 17 October 1942.

She commenced refit the following day alongside submarine tender Sperry. Wahoo then shifted to Submarine Base Pearl Harbor for overhaul. There, a 4 in (100 mm) gun and two 20 mm guns were installed. Overhaul was completed on 2 November, and after three days' training, Wahoo was again ready for sea.

== Second patrol, November – December 1942 ==
On 8 November 1942, Wahoo got underway for her second war patrol, with LCDR Dudley Walker "Mush" Morton also aboard for his prospective commanding officer patrol. She arrived at her assigned area in the Solomon Islands, keeping Bougainville and Buka Island in sight. On 30 November, the submarine spotted smoke at a distance of 8,000 yd (7,300 m); it was a lightly loaded freighter or transport with an escorting destroyer on the port bow. Wahoo's approach was unsuccessful, and she proceeded east of Cape Hanpan.

Having patrolled the Buka-Kilinailau Channel for 17 days, on 7 December, Kennedy decided to patrol the direct route between Truk and the Shortland Islands for a few days. This proved fruitless, and Wahoo returned to her former hunting grounds, the Buka-Kilinailau Channel. On 10 December, while making her return trip, Wahoo ran across a convoy of three heavily loaded cargo ships escorted by a destroyer. She chose the destroyer as the first target, but proved unable to attain a firing position. Instead, she fired a spread of four torpedoes at the largest tanker, from a range of 700 yd (640 m). Although three hit, Kamoi Maru (5,300 long tons (5,385 t)) needed two hours to sink. The destroyer got too close and Wahoo started down before another attack could be launched. The destroyer dropped around 40 depth charges; none was close. Rather than use the new SJ radar to mount a second attack, which might well sink the freighter (then stopped to pick up survivors), and possibly even the destroyer, Wahoo let them go on a northeasterly course and moved into a new area.

Four days later, a hospital ship was sighted headed for the Shortland Islands. Shortly after, Wahoo claimed to have sunk a submarine that Kennedy (mistakenly) identified as Japanese submarine I-15. On 15 December, Wahoo left the area and looked into Kieta Harbor, Buka Island, and passed Moreton Light on 26 December for entrance into Brisbane, Australia, where she commenced refit the following day. On 31 December 1942, LCDR Kennedy was relieved as commanding officer; Morton replaced him.

== Third patrol, January – February 1943 ==
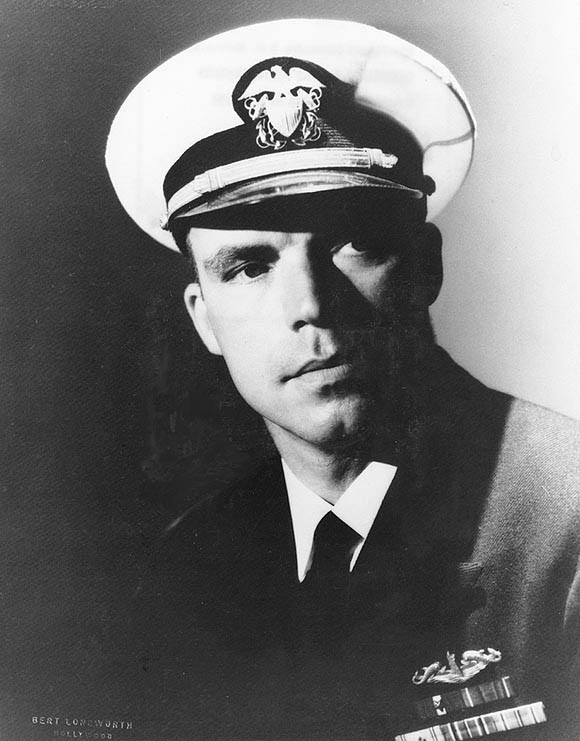
Cdr. Dudley W. Morton

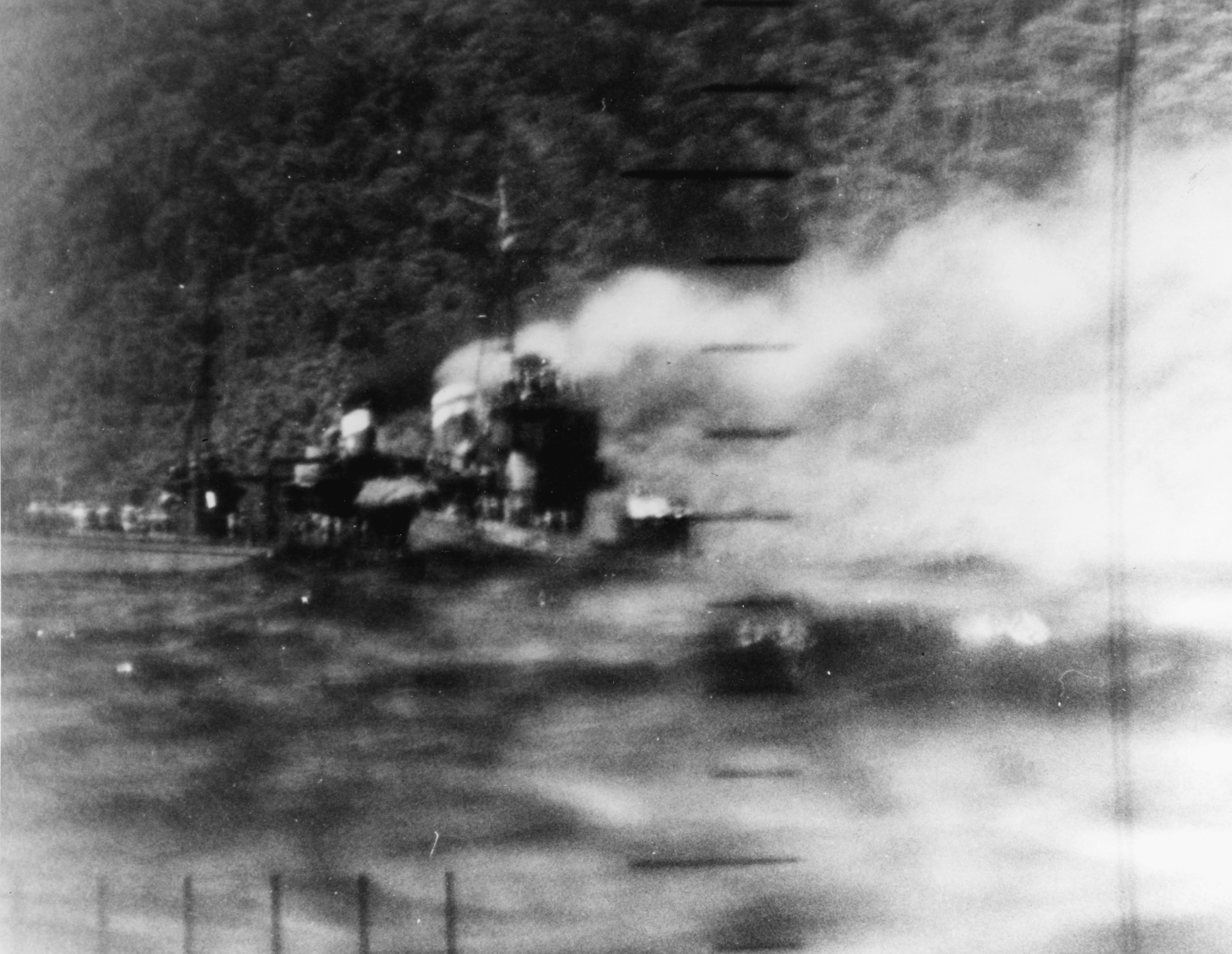
Harusame torpedoed by Wahoo

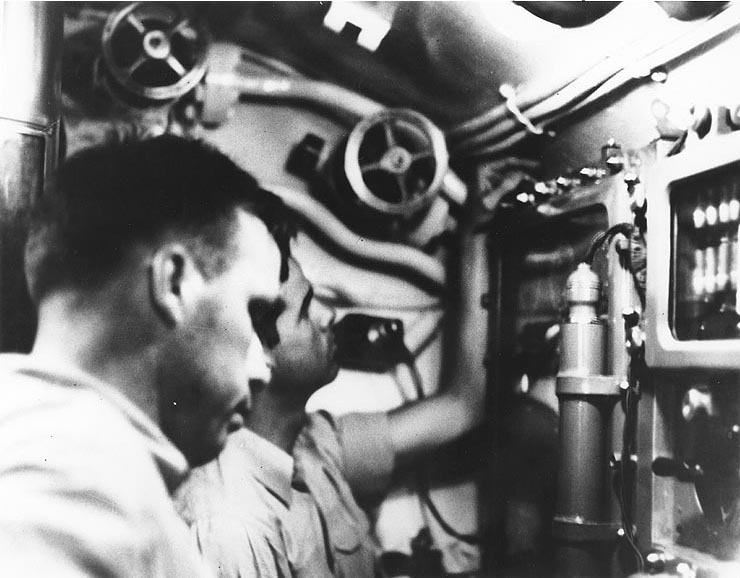
Morton (front) and LT Roger Paine in the conning tower of Wahoo during an attack on a Japanese convoy off New Guinea, 26 January 1943

Prior to his first patrol as Wahoo's commanding officer, Morton gave a brief but legendary address to the crew. He declared the Wahoo to be expendable, and that any crew member who wanted to remain in Brisbane had half an hour to notify the yeoman for a transfer. No negative word would be said about anyone who stayed behind. None of the crew accepted the offer to stay behind.

Wahoo was ready for sea again on 16 January 1943. She performed sonar tests in Moreton Bay with the destroyer Patterson before beginning her third war patrol. Three days later, the submarine passed into Vitiaz Strait en route to her patrol area. Wahoo's orders were to reconnoiter Wewak, a Japanese supply base on the north coast of New Guinea between Kairiru Island and Mushu Island. One large problem existed, though; Wahoo had no charts of the harbor. Motor Machinist's Mate Dalton "Bird Dog" Keeter turned out to have bought a cheap school atlas while in Australia. It had a map of New Guinea with a small indentation labeled "Wewak". With that as a reference, a blowup of the Navy chart was made.

On 24 January 1943, Wahoo dove 2 nmi (2.3 mi; 3.7 km) north of Kairiru Island and proceeded around the western end to penetrate Victoria Bay. She sighted the Japanese destroyer Harusame with RO-class submarines nested alongside. The destroyer was getting underway, so Wahoo fired a spread of three torpedoes at the moving target from 1,200 yd (1,100 m); all missed aft. Another torpedo was fired, which the destroyer avoided by turning away, continuing through 270° of a circle and headed straight for Wahoo, whose position was marked by the wakes of the steam torpedoes. At a range of 800 yd (730 m) she fired her last bow torpedo. This hit amidships, breaking the destroyer's back. "Apparently, her skipper had lost his nerve when he saw our last torpedo heading toward him and put the rudder over to try to miss it, and by swinging himself broadside to it he signed the destroyer's death warrant." Wahoo had no difficulty escaping from the area. Despite heavy damage, Harusame was beached and repaired.

The next day, Wahoo changed course for Palau. On 26 January, the submarine sighted the smoke of two ships. Wahoo obtained a position, launched two torpedoes at the leading ship, and 17 seconds later, two at the second ship. The first two torpedoes hit the Fukuei Maru. The third passed ahead of the second freighter, the fourth hit. Upon observing the damage, Wahoo discovered two more ships, a huge transport, Buyo Maru, and a tanker. Fukuei Maru was listing badly to starboard and sinking by the stern; the second ship was headed directly for Wahoo at a slow speed. Ignoring this, Wahoo fired a three-torpedo spread at the transport; the second and third hit and stopped her.

Turning her attention to the second target, which was still headed for her, Wahoo fired two bow tubes "down the throat" to stop her. The second torpedo hit, but the target kept coming and forced the submarine to turn hard to port at full speed to avoid being rammed. So many explosions followed that determining what was happening became difficult. Returning to periscope depth, Wahoo observed Fukuei Maru had sunk; the second target was still moving, evidently with steering trouble; and Buyo Maru was stopped but still afloat.

Wahoo headed for the transport and fired a bow tube; the torpedo passed directly under the middle of the ship, but failed to explode. The sub then fired another torpedo, which headed right for the stack and blew the target apart midships. The submarine then headed for the crippled freighter, which had formed up with a tanker, and both ships were moving away. Wahoo decided to let these two ships get over the horizon, while she surfaced to charge her batteries and attack the shipwrecked Japanese now sitting in about 20 lifeboats. Controversy still attaches to this action in that troops in the water may have been deliberately targeted by Wahoo. Vice Admiral Charles A. Lockwood, then COMSUBPAC, asserts that the survivors were army troops and turned machinegun and rifle fire on Wahoo while she maneuvered on the surface, and that such resistance was common in submarine warfare. Richard O'Kane stated that the fire from Wahoo was intended to force the troops to abandon their boats, and no troops were deliberately targeted. Clay Blair states that Morton opened fire first and the shipwrecked returned fire with handguns.

The report for Patrol Three described the events as follows:

At 1115 ...Decided to let these two ship[s] get over the horizon while we surfaced to charge batteries and destroy the estimate[d] twenty troop boats now in the water. These boats were of many types, scows, motor launches, cabin cruisers and other nondescript varieties. At 1315 made battle surface and manned all guns. Fired 4 in [100 mm] gun at largest scow loaded with troops. Although all troops in this boat apparently jumped in the water our fire was returned by small caliber machine guns. We then opened fire with everything we had...

Whatever the case, Wahoo had misidentified the survivors as Japanese. In fact, they were mainly Indian POWs of 2nd Battalion, 16th Punjab Regiment, plus escorting forces from the Japanese 26th Field Ordnance Depot. Of 1,126 men aboard Buyo Maru, 195 Indians and 87 Japanese died in all, including those killed in the initial sinking. The low number suggests O'Kane's defense, that Morton fired only on the boats, may be correct. It proved a rare occurrence in any event.

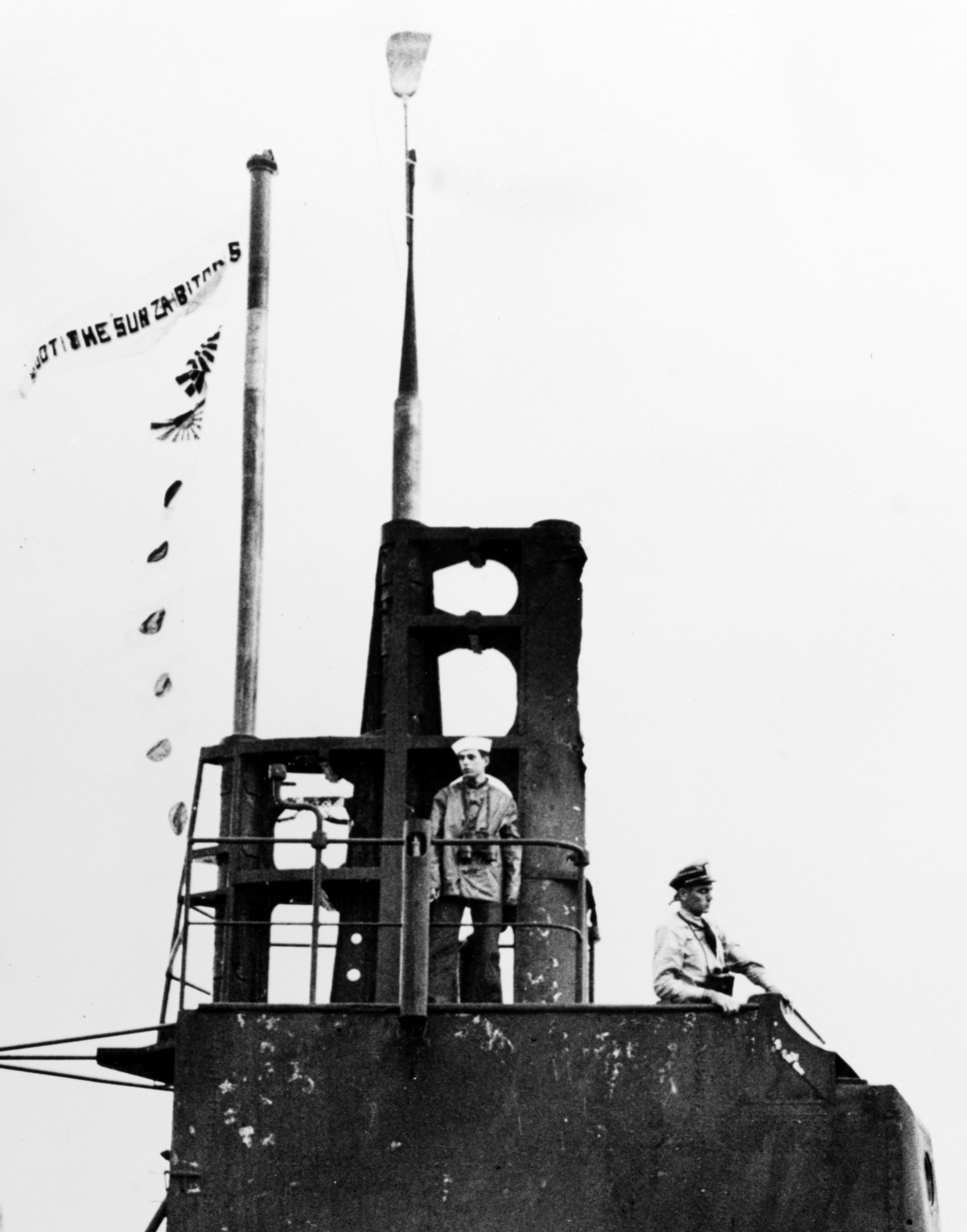
A broom on the periscope on return to Pearl Harbor, 1943: The broom indicates the oceans were "swept clean". The pennant reads, "Shoot the sunza bitches".

After some time, Wahoo moved away to intercept the two fleeing ships. She decided to attack the tanker first, since she was as yet undamaged. With only four torpedoes left, the submarine fired two at the tanker, the second hitting her just abaft of midships, breaking her back; she went down almost instantly. Wahoo then turned her attention to the freighter and fired her last two torpedoes without a spread. They both hit. Fifteen minutes later, the freighter sank, having absorbed four hits from three separate attacks. Wahoo then set a course for Fais Island. Postwar, JANAC credited Wahoo with only three sinkings: the transport, Buyo Maru (5,300 tons), Fukuei Maru (2,000 long tons (2,032 t)), and an unknown maru (4,000 long tons (4,064 t)).

On 27 January 1943, Wahoo made contact with a convoy of eight ships, including two freighters and a tanker. Morton proposed a novel attack. The tanker was unarmed and appeared to be having trouble maintaining convoy speed. Morton decided to surface astern of this ship, which would panic the convoy and cause it to scatter. After the convoy broke up, Wahoo would use her deck gun to sink the tanker.

Morton's plan worked, up to a point. She surfaced and the convoy scattered, but before Morton could have the deck gun manned, a Japanese destroyer escort charged out of a rain squall onto the scene, forcing Wahoo to run for it. The submarine had no option but to retreat, since she had previously expended all torpedoes. After coming into firing range and opening fire on Wahoo, forcing her under, the persistent destroyer escort dropped six depth charges, none close. On this occasion, Morton transmitted the famous message: "Another running gun battle today. Destroyer gunning, Wahoo running".

The next day, Wahoo sighted Fais Island, and her plan to shell a phosphorite refinery was scrapped due to the untimely appearance of an interisland steamer.

The submarine left station and arrived at Pearl Harbor on 7 February, only 23 days after leaving Brisbane (most patrols were in the 60‑ to 75‑day range). Prior to entering the naval base, Wahoo donned topside embellishments to celebrate her victory. A straw broom was lashed to her periscope shears to indicate a clean sweep. From the signal halyard fluttered eight tiny Japanese flags, one for each Japanese ship believed to have been sunk by Wahoo to that point in the war.

Wahoo commenced refit by a tender relief crew and the ship's crew. On 15 February, refit was completed, and the submarine was declared ready for sea on 17 February. She then conducted two days of training and was drydocked at the Submarine Base, Pearl Harbor, on 21 February.

== Fourth patrol, February – April 1943 ==
On 23 February 1943, Wahoo got underway for Midway Island, where she arrived four days later, topped off her fuel tanks, and headed for her patrol area. For Wahoo's fourth patrol, Morton was assigned to the extreme northern reaches of the Yellow Sea, in the vicinity of the Yalu River and Dairen, an area never before patrolled by U.S. submarines. One reason for this was the water was shallow, averaging 120 ft (37 m). While en route to her patrol area, she conducted training dives, fire-control drills, and battle-surface drills. She had the unique experience of making the entire passage to the East China Sea without sighting a single aircraft, thus making most of the trip surfaced. On 11 March, Wahoo arrived in her assigned area along the Nagasaki-Formosa and Shimonoseki-Formosa shipping routes.

On 19 March 1943, the shooting began with a freighter identified as Zogen Maru. A single torpedo hit broke the target in two; the aft end sank immediately, and the bow sank two minutes later, with no survivors. Four hours later, Wahoo sighted another freighter, Kowa Maru, and launched two torpedoes. The first hit under the target's foremast with a terrific blast, leaving a tremendous hole in her side, but the bow remained intact. The second torpedo hit amidships, but as a dud, it did not explode. Two more torpedoes were fired, but the freighter maneuvered to avoid them.

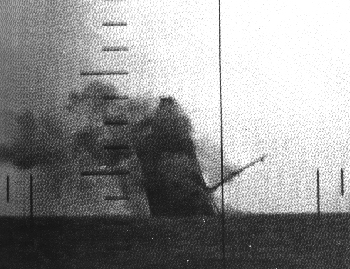
The Japanese freighter Nittsu Maru sank by the bow after being torpedoed by Wahoo.

Wahoo then patrolled off the Korean coast, just south of Chinnampo. On 21 March, she sighted a large freighter identified as Hozen Maru. She launched three torpedoes; the third hit the target amidships. She went down by the bow, sinking in four minutes, leaving about 33 survivors clinging to the debris.

Four hours later, Wahoo sighted the freighter Nittsu Maru. The submarine fired a spread of three torpedoes; two hit, one under the bridge and the other under the mainmast. The ship went down in three minutes. Wahoo surfaced and ran over one of the lifeboats, knocking the survivors into the frigid waters. A deck gun was used to kill the swimmers. Four survivors ignored all efforts to rescue them. After collecting a few souvenirs from the scattered wreckage, Wahoo commenced a surfaced patrol, heading for Shantung Promontory. On 22 March, the submarine headed for the Laotiehshan Promontory, close to Port Arthur.

The following day, as Wahoo patrolled Laotiehshan Channel (also known as "Sampan Alley"), she found herself surrounded by targets. Wahoo sighted a medium-sized ship, apparently a freighter, the collier Katyosan Maru, and launched one torpedo. This hit the target just under her bridge, immediately enveloping the target in a screen of coal dust. The maru settled fast and slowed down, vanishing in 13 minutes.

Wahoo set course for a point to the northeast of Round Island, in Korea Bay, 50 km southeast of Dairen. In the vicinity of the approaches to this port, the deepest water is about 300 ft (91 m), with an average depth of only 120 ft (37 m).

At 12:47 on 24 March, Wahoo sighted smoke and began to make her approach. At 19:49, she fired a spread of three torpedoes at a large tanker (identified as Takaosan Maru), which was fully loaded with fuel oil. The first two torpedoes exploded prematurely, and the third one missed. Wahoo fired a fourth torpedo, which also missed. The target commenced firing deck guns at the American warship. The submarine surfaced after 14 minutes of ducking shots, gained position ahead, and dove. She fired another three-torpedo spread. One hit the engine room and sank the ship in four minutes.

The next day, Wahoo sighted the freighter Satsuki Maru. She launched two torpedoes; when both exploded prematurely, Wahoo "battle surfaced" to use her deck guns. She closed the target, raked her with 20 mm shells and struck her with almost 90 rounds of four-inch shells. The target caught fire in several places and sank in about one hour.

Wahoo left the following morning to investigate a ship on the horizon. This target proved to be a small, diesel-driven freighter. The submarine commenced firing with her 20 mm and four-inch deck guns. The freighter tried to ram her, but Wahoo maneuvered clear, and then continued firing at the target, setting her ablaze from stem to stern, and leaving her dead in the water. The crew took turns looking through the periscope as the freighter sank.

Later that day, Wahoo sighted a 100-long-ton (100 t) trawler Bonshu Maru 95 and again attacked with her deck guns. When all three of her 20 mm guns jammed, the Wahoo went alongside the riddled trawler and the sailors of Wahoo hurled homemade Molotov cocktails (gifts from the U.S. Marines at Midway Atoll) onto the trawler. Wahoo departed, leaving the fishing boat wrecked, spouting flame and smoke. On 28 March, while on the surface astride the Shimonoseki-Formosa shipping route, Wahoo opened fire with two 20 mm guns on two motor sampans. The targets did not sink, but they were left in a wrecked condition.

On the following day, Wahoo sighted the freighter Yamabato Maru and fired two of her stern torpedo tubes. The first torpedo hit at the point of aim under the mainmast and completely disintegrated everything abaft her stack. The forward section sank in two minutes. The second torpedo was aimed at the foremast, but it missed because the first torpedo stopped the freighter in her tracks.

Wahoo surfaced, transited the Collnett Strait, and headed home, concluding a war patrol that topped the record to date in number of ships sunk. The American submarine command in Pearl Harbor reported that the "Japanese think a submarine wolf pack operating in Yellow Sea. All shipping tied up."

Meanwhile, the United States mounted its offensive against Attu, and Admiral Mineichi Koga returned his major units from Truk to Tokyo Bay via a sortie to Alaska. Forewarned by American codebreakers that the Japanese intended to counter the invasion of Attu by a major sortie of the IJN fleet, COMSUBPAC sent his top sub, Wahoo, to the Kuril Islands to intercept it.

On 6 April 1943, Wahoo arrived at Midway, and she commenced a refit on the following day. On 21–22 April, she conducted training underway and was declared ready for sea on 25 April.

== Fifth patrol, April – May 1943 ==
Wahoo began her fifth war patrol on 25 April, departing Midway under air escort for patrol areas via the Kuril Islands. The following day, she patrolled the surface and reconnoitered Matsuwa, taking photographs of the enemy installations, exploring southwest along the island chain and finding the islands barren and completely covered with snow and ice.

On 4 May, Wahoo proceeded to reconnoiter the northeast tip of Etorofu Island; she found nothing and changed course to the southeast. Morton positioned the boat to intercept the seaplane tender Kimikawa Maru. The submarine submerged and fired a spread of three torpedoes. The first hit between the stack and bridge; the other two missed. Kimikawa turned away and was making 11 kn (13 mph; 20 km/h), with a slight list. The ship is sometimes misidentified as Kamikawa Maru. Wahoo continued on an easterly course, surfaced, and continued her patrol of the Kurils southward.

Three days later, Wahoo sighted two ships hugging the shoreline on a northerly course, 12 nmi (14 mi; 22 km) off the Benten Saki coast, and dove. She launched two torpedoes at the leading ship, followed immediately by a spread of four at the escort. The first torpedo hit the leading ship, Tamon Maru #5, under the stack and broke her back; the second missed ahead. The escort successfully avoided all four torpedoes fired at her and then escaped. The Tamon Maru (5,260 long tons (5,344 t)) sank, and Wahoo proceeded down the coast.

The submarine submerged 1 nmi (1.2 mi; 1.9 km) off Kobe Zaki and sighted a convoy consisting of two escort vessels and a large naval auxiliary. Wahoo fired a spread of three torpedoes; two exploded prematurely, and the third failed to explode. This ship got away, and Wahoo was forced down by the escorts.

On the night of 9 May 1943, Wahoo proceeded up the coast with the intention of closing Kone Saki. Radar picked up two targets, soon identified as a large tanker and a freighter in column, evidently making the night run between ports without escort. The submarine fired a spread of three torpedoes at the tanker and immediately thereafter a three-torpedo spread at the freighter. Wahoo had two successful hits, and both ships went down - Takao Maru (3,200 long tons (3,251 t)) and Jinmu Maru (1,200 long tons (1,219 t)).

Wahoo cleared the area to the northeast to patrol the Tokyo-Paramushiro route; on 12 May, she sighted two freighters. She dove to gain position for a "two-ship" shot where they would come by in column. She launched four torpedoes from 1,200 yd (1,100 m), but got only one hit. Morton fired his last two torpedoes. Nothing was seen of the first. The second hit under the bridge with a dull thud, much louder than the duds heard only on sonar but lacking the "whacking" noise that accompanies a wholehearted explosion. The other freighter opened fire with its deck guns and charged Wahoo. Both ships got away. Wahoo cleared the area to the east and set course for Pearl Harbor.

Wahoo's fifth war patrol was again considered outstanding in aggressiveness and efficiency. In 10 action-packed days, Wahoo delivered 10 torpedo attacks on eight different targets. However, faulty torpedo performance cut positive results by as much as one-half.

In these last three patrols, Wahoo established a record, not only in damage inflicted on the enemy for three successive patrols, but also for accomplishing this feat in the shortest time on patrol - a total of 93,281 long tons (94,778 t) sunk and 30,880 long tons (31,376 t) damaged in only 25 patrol days.

Wahoo arrived at Pearl Harbor on 21 May 1943. The next day, Admiral Chester W. Nimitz, the CINCPAC, came on board and presented awards. Two days later, the submarine departed for the Mare Island Navy Yard, where she arrived 29 May to commence overhaul. From 11–20 July, the submarine underwent intensive postrepair trials and training. On 20 July, squadron commander Captain John B. Griggs, Jr., came aboard and presented more awards. On the following day, Wahoo departed for Pearl Harbor, furnishing services for surface and air forces while en route. She arrived at Hawaii on 27 July 1943 and departed on 2 August for her patrol area. Four days later, Wahoo arrived at Midway Island, but she left on the same day.

== Sixth patrol, August 1943 ==
On 13 August, Wahoo entered the Sea of Okhotsk, having completed the passage through the Etorofu Strait. She arrived in the Sea of Japan the following day and sighted three medium freighters headed south. The submarine launched one torpedo at the trailing ship; it missed. The next day (15 August), while still on the trail of those three freighters, Wahoo sighted a large freighter on a northerly course. Deciding to attack the larger, single target, the submarine broke off the pursuit of the three freighters, surfaced, and commenced tracking the new target, diving to make a submerged approach. Wahoo launched one torpedo; it hit at the point of aim, but was a dud. She fired two more torpedoes; both missed. Wahoo then swung around to bring her stern torpedo tubes to bear and headed directly for the target. The submarine fired another torpedo, which missed and must have broached and exploded before the end of the run. Wahoo soon sighted an Otori-class torpedo boat and commenced evasive action, letting the large freighter escape. She decided to move over on the Hokkaidō-Korea shipping route and spend the night and the following day transiting to that area.

On 16 August, Wahoo sighted a freighter headed south, but made another contact in a better position for attack. Shifting targets, she launched one torpedo at a medium-sized freighter, but it missed. The next day, the scene was repeated with the same results. No pursuit was undertaken, in hopes of a loaded target heading south. However, Wahoo sighted a freighter heading north in ballast and commenced a submerged approach. Morton launched one torpedo that missed. Just as the torpedo left its tube, a southbound freighter passed close aboard this target, but the torpedo missed. Wahoo then surfaced and chased the southbound freighter. While pursuing this ship, the submarine sighted another target well ahead and away from the coast, so she again shifted targets. While tracking this new target, she passed two small, northbound ships – one looked like a tug and the other resembled a tanker. Wahoo made a submerged approach and launched a torpedo at the medium-sized freighter. It was a miss. She fired again; still a miss, but this torpedo, probably broaching, exploded. The submarine surfaced and headed further out to sea.

Within four days, 12 Japanese vessels were sighted; nine were hunted down and attacked to no avail. Ten torpedoes broached, made erratic runs, or were duds. In light of the poor torpedo performance, ComSubPac ordered Wahoo to return to base.

On 19 August, the submarine sighted a ship and commenced tracking, but she withheld her fire when her crew recognized the flag as Soviet (an ally of the United States at the time). Wahoo made for La Perouse Strait. The next day, she sighted a sampan and fired warning shots across the bow. When the sampan failed to stop, the submarine opened up on it with her 20 mm and four-inch guns. The sampan was soon a wreck. Six Japanese fishermen surrendered and were taken on board as prisoners of war. Eight hours later, Wahoo opened fire on two more sampans, enveloping them in flames. Members of the crews jumped overboard, but showed no desire to be rescued. Wahoo completed the passage of Etorofu Strait, and then arrived at Midway on 25 August. She immediately got underway for Pearl Harbor, and she arrived there on 29 August.

== Seventh patrol and loss, September–October 1943 ==
Morton, smarting from that last luckless patrol, asked to return to the Sea of Japan, and permission was granted. He elected to take a full load of newly arrived Mark 18 electric torpedoes rather than take the risk that further production runs of the Mark 14 steam torpedoes might still be defective. Wahoo got underway from Pearl Harbor, topped off fuel and supplies at Midway on 13 September, and headed for La Perouse Strait. The plan was to enter the Sea of Japan first, on or about 20 September, with Sawfish following by a few days. At sunset on 21 October, Wahoo was supposed to leave her assigned area, south of the 43rd parallel, and head for home. She was instructed to report by radio after she passed through the Kurils. Nothing further was ever heard from Wahoo.

On 25 September 1943, the Taiko Maru was torpedoed in the Sea of Japan; mistakenly credited to the USS Pompano (SS-181), she was apparently sunk by Wahoo.

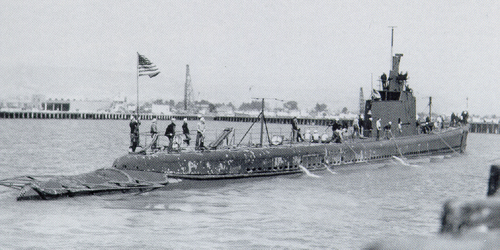
Wahoo

On 5 October, the Japanese news agency Domei announced to the world that a steamer, the 8,000 long tons (8,128 t) Konron Maru, was sunk by an American submarine off the west coast of Honshū near Tsushima Strait, with the loss of 544 lives. The victims included two Japanese congressmen of the House of Representatives, Choichi Kato and Keishiro Sukekawa. Postwar reckoning by JANAC showed Wahoo sank three other ships for 5,300 tons, making a patrol total of four ships of about 13,000 long tons. The sinking of Konron Maru enraged the Japanese navy, and the Maizuru Naval District ordered a search-and-destroy operation for US submarines.

Japanese records also reported that on 11 October, the date Wahoo was due to exit through La Pérouse Strait in the morning, Wahoo was bombarded from Cape Sōya. An antisubmarine aircraft (likely an Aichi E13A floatplane) sighted a wake and an apparent oil slick from a submerged submarine. The Japanese initiated a combined air and sea attack with numerous bombs and depth charges throughout the day. Sawfish had been depth-charged by a patrol boat while transiting the strait two days before, and the enemy's antisubmarine forces were on the alert; their attacks fatally holed Wahoo, and she sank with all hands. She was declared overdue on 2 December 1943 and stricken from the Naval Vessel Register on 6 December 1943.

After the loss of Wahoo, no US submarines ventured into the Sea of Japan until June 1945, when special mine-detecting equipment became available.

Wahoo earned six battle stars for World War II service.

== The search for and discovery of Wahoo ==
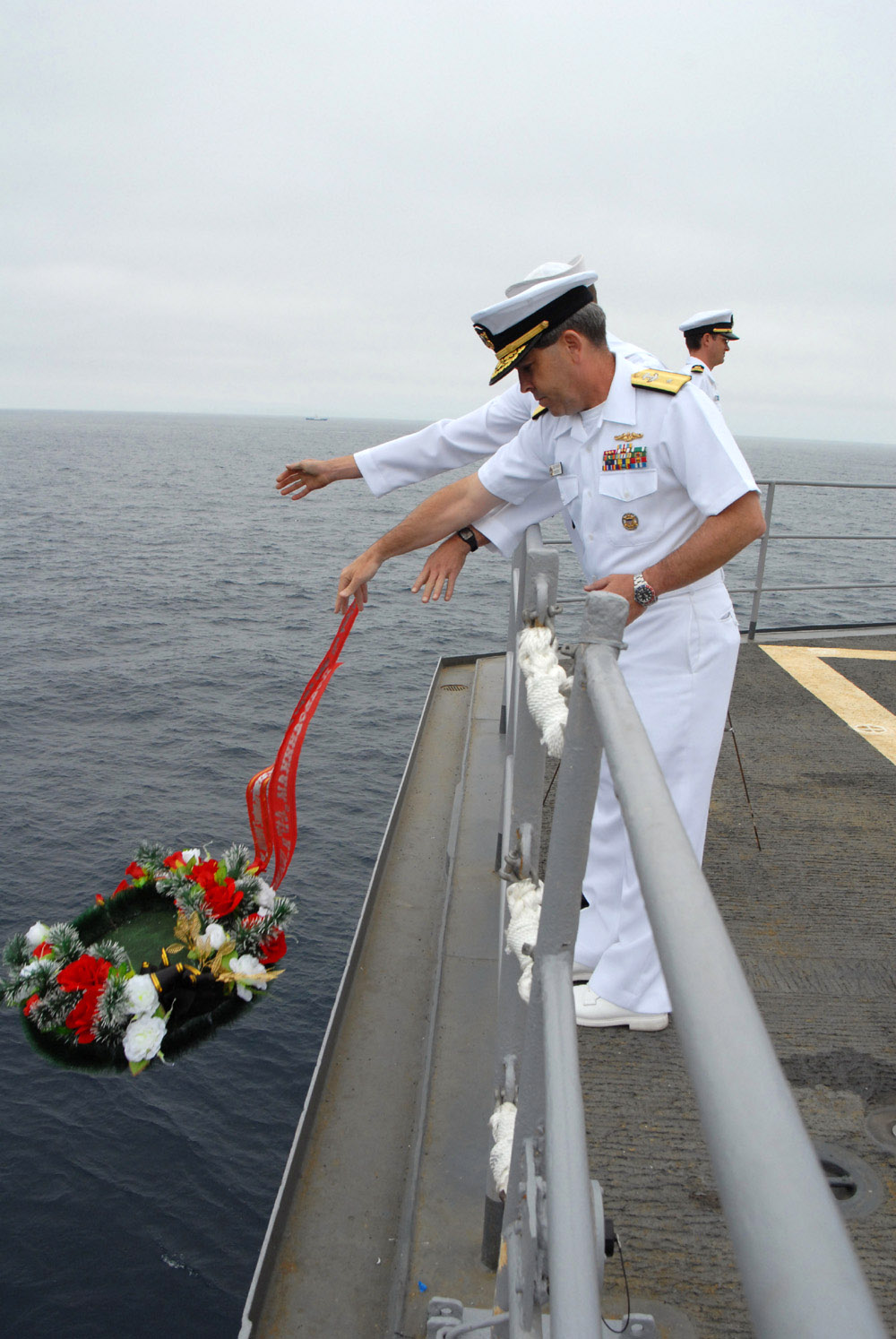
U.S. Navy wreath-laying ceremony for USS Wahoo

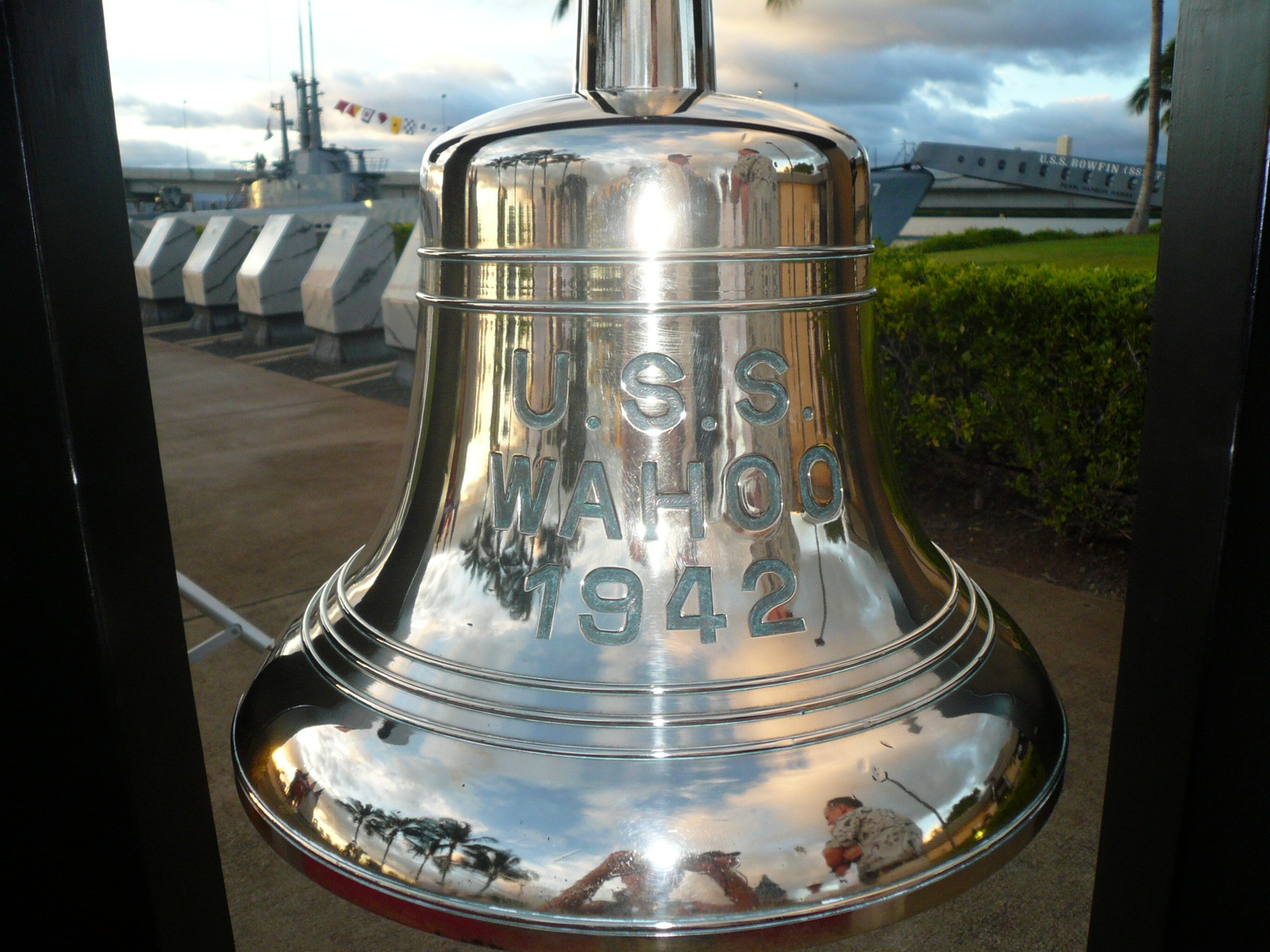
USS Wahoo Ship's bell during 2007 ceremony

Wahoo had long been believed to be resting in the Soya (La Pérouse) Strait between Hokkaidō, Japan, and Sakhalin, Russia. Beginning in 1995, the Wahoo Project Group (an international team of Americans, Australians, Japanese, and Russians, and led by a relative of Commander Morton's) searched for her based on the available evidence. Japanese Vice Admiral Kazuo Ueda, working with the Wahoo Project Group, examined the historical record and correctly predicted the location of Wahoo in 2006.

In 2005, electronic surveys in the region yielded what turned out to be a USS Gato-class submarine in the strait; in July 2006, the Russian team "Iskra" investigated the site, which contributed further evidence of location of Wahoo.

On 31 October 2006, the U.S. Navy confirmed that the images provided by the "Iskra" team are of Wahoo, the wreckage lying intact in about 213 ft (65 m) of water in the La Pérouse (Soya) Strait. The submarine was sunk by a direct hit from an aerial bomb near the conning tower.

On 8 July 2007, the U.S. Navy conducted a wreath-laying ceremony at sea for the crew of Wahoo. The ceremony was held on the confirmed site of the sinking of the submarine as a joint exercise with the Navy of the Russian Federation.

On 11 October 2007, the U.S. Navy held an official remembrance ceremony for the crew of Wahoo, conducted at the USS Bowfin Submarine Museum and Park at Pearl Harbor, and followed by a presentation of the history of Wahoo search and discovery by the Wahoo Project Group.

In May 2024, the Russian Geographical Society demonstrated a video of the wreckage of the submarine and installed a commemorative underwater plaque, as well as a wreath with the inscription "Russians remember".

== Awards ==
- Navy Presidential Unit Citation
- Asiatic–Pacific Campaign Medal with six battle stars
- World War II Victory Medal

== See also ==
- List of military figures by nickname

== Sources ==
- Bauer, K. Jack; Roberts, Stephen S. (1991), Register of Ships of the U.S. Navy, 1775–1990: Major Combatants, Westport, Connecticut: Greenwood Press, ISBN 978-0-313-26202-9
- Blair, Clay (2001), Silent Victory, Naval Institute Press, ISBN 978-1-55750-217-9
- Bridgland, Tony (2002), Waves of Hate, Naval Institute Press, ISBN 978-1-55750-439-5
- Commander, U.S. Pacific Fleet Public Affairs (31 October 2006), Navy Says Wreck Found Off Japan is Legendary Sub USS Wahoo, Department of the Navy (Dead Link)
- DeRose, James F. (2000), Unrestricted Warfare, John Wiley & Sons
- Friedman, Norman (1995), U.S. Submarines Through 1945: An Illustrated Design History, Annapolis, Maryland: United States Naval Institute, ISBN 978-1-55750-263-6
- Grider, George (1973) [1958], War Fish (paperback ed.), Ballantine Books, ISBN 978-0-345-03217-1
- Holwitt, Joel I. (2005), Execute Against Japan, Ohio State University PhD dissertation.
- Lockwood, Charles A. (1984) [1951], Sink 'em All (paperback ed.), Bantaam Books, ISBN 978-0-553-23919-5
- Morton, Dudley (1943), USS Wahoo (SS-238), 1942–1943 – Third War Patrol, January–February 1943, Department of the Navy – Naval Historical Center, archived from the original on 15 August 2002
- O'Kane, Richard H. (1987), Wahoo: The Patrols of America's Most Famous WWII Submarine, Presidio Press, ISBN 978-0-89141-301-1. Rear Admiral USN (ret.) O'Kane was Wahoo's executive officer on her first five war patrols.
