= Opasnost Rocks =

Opasnost Rocks Камень Опасности
- Island
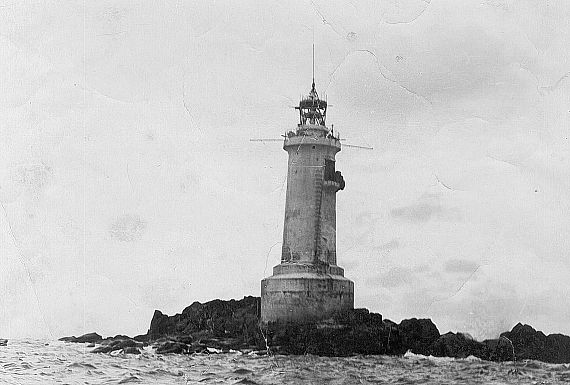
- Lighthouse on Kamen Opasnosti.

- Location within Sakhalin Oblast
- Coordinates: 45.7875°N 142.217°E
- Country: Russian Federation
- Federal subject: Far Eastern Federal District
- Oblast: Sakhalin Oblast

The Opasnost Rocks (Russian: Камень Опасности, lit. 'Rock of Danger', Japanese: Nijō Rock (二丈岩, Nijō-iwa)) is an islet group of rocks, in La Pérouse Strait and the Sea of Okhotsk.

== Geography ==
The Opasnost Rocks are located around 14 kilometres (8.7 mi) southeast of Cape Crillon, the southernmost point of Sakhalin island.

It is a small group of bare rocks, devoid of vegetation. Its length is 150 metres (490 ft), its width is 50 metres (160 ft), and its highest point is approx. 8 metres (26 ft).

== History ==
The rocks were a great hindrance to marine traffic in La Pérouse Strait, aggravated by frequent dense fogs in the summertime. To avoid possible collision, ships had to set some of their crew members on guard to locate the rocks by listening to the roar of sea lions living on it. A lighthouse was finally constructed on the rocks in 1913, during the Japanese administration of the area. Today, the lighthouse is powered by a radioisotope thermoelectric generator.

In the 1930s, the rocks were an obstacle along one of the routes taken by NKVD ships carrying enslaved political prisoners to the port of Magadan for transfer to the Gulag mines in Kolyma.

== See also ==
- Islands of the Sea of Okhotsk
- Islands of the Russian Far East
