= 5R =

5R may refer to:

- Yaesu VX-5R, an ultra-compact amateur radio transceiver
- IRS Aero IATA designator
- Karthago Airlines IATA designator
- Madagascar aircraft registration code
- A standard consumer print size for photographs. See Standard photographic print sizes.
- 5R, the production code for the 1980 Doctor Who serial Full Circle
- 5R Fulton Rapid, a San Francisco bus line

== See also ==
- R5 (disambiguation)
