= R5 =

R5 may refer to:

== Roads or railroads ==
- Autopista Radial R-5, a Spanish radial motorway
- R5 (RER Vaud), an S-Bahn line in the canton of Vaud
- R5 expressway (Slovakia)
- R5 road (Zimbabwe), a road connecting Harare with Mutare
- Radial Road 5 or R-5, an arterial road of Manila, Philippines
- Line R5, a commuter rail service on the Llobregat–Anoia Line, in Barcelona, Catalonia, Spain
- R5 Doylestown, a rail line in Philadelphia, USA
- R5 Paoli-Thorndale, a rail line in Philadelphia, USA

== Ships ==
- HMS Invincible (R05), a 1980 British Royal Navy light aircraft carrier
- HMS Urania (R05), a World War II British Royal Navy U-class destroyer
- USS R-5 (SS-82), a 1918 R-class coastal and harbor defense submarine of the United States Navy

== Cars ==
- Jaguar R5, a Jaguar Racing car for the 2004 Formula One season
- Renault 5, a French automobile
- R5 (rallying) a class within Group R regulations for rallying

== Aircraft ==
- Kinner R-5, a popular engine for light general and sport aircraft
- Polikarpov R-5, a reconnaissance biplane widespread in the Soviet Union before World War II
- Sikorsky R-5, an early USAF designation of Sikorsky S-51 helicopter, changed to H-5
- Thomas-Morse R-5, a 1920s American racing aircraft

== Buildings ==
- Regjeringskvartalet, a building in the Norwegian Government quarter (Norw. Regjeringskvartalet)

== Weapons ==
- R5 assault rifle, a variant of the South African R4 assault rifle compact carbine
- R-5 Pobeda, a theatre ballistic missile developed by the Soviet Union during the Cold War

== Medicine and chemistry ==
- R5 virus, a form of HIV tropism
- ATC code R05 Cough and cold preparations, a subgroup of the Anatomical Therapeutic Chemical Classification System
- Cough ICD-10
- R5: Heating may cause an explosion, a risk phrase in chemistry
- receptor 5, the fifth in line of a series of cellular receptors, generally at the end of an acronym

== Other uses ==
- R5 (band), an American pop-rock band
- R5 (bootleg), a copy of a movie made with a telecine machine from an analog source
- Region 5, the DVD region code for most of Africa, Asia, and the former Soviet Union
- BBC Radio 5 Live, a British radio station
- Jordan Aviation, IATA airline designator
- Malta Air Charter, former IATA airline designator
- R5 series of preferred numbers
- Radeon R5, graphics processing units in the Radeon 200 series
- a type of droid from Star Wars, such as R5-D4
- R5 Hastings St, an express bus service in Metro Vancouver, British Columbia, Canada
- Canon EOS R5, a Canon full-frame mirrorless interchangeable-lens camera
- Valkyrie (robot), a humanoid robot developed by NASA in 2013, also called R5

== See also ==
- 5R (disambiguation)
- MS R Five, original name of the cruise ship MS Nautica
