= La Pérouse Strait =

Strait between Hokkaido, Japan and Sakhalin, Russia

Coordinates: 45°43′20″N 142°01′36″E

- 宗谷海峡 Sōya Kaikyō (Japanese); Пролив Лаперуза Proliv Laperuza (Russian)
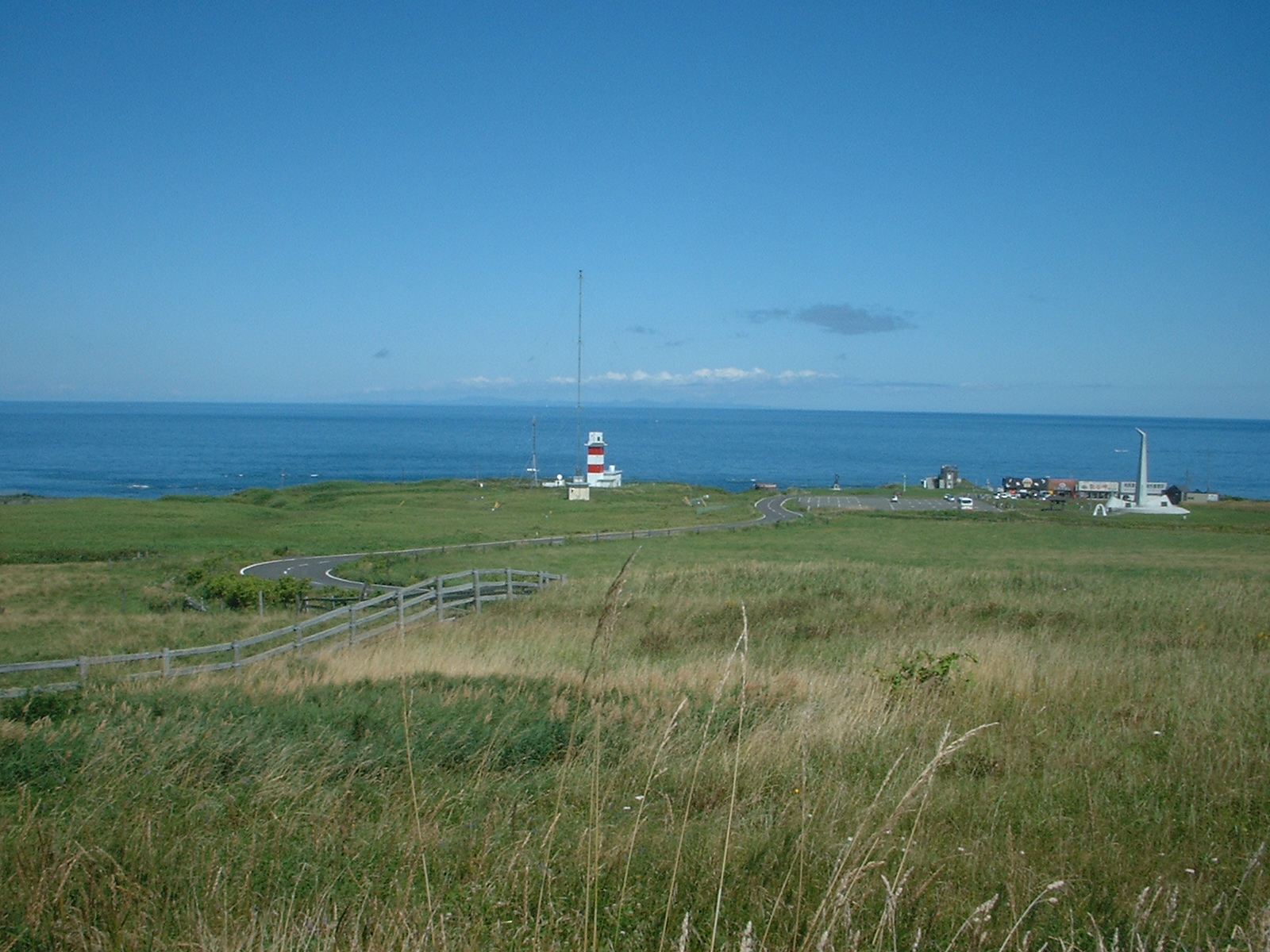
- La Pérouse Strait, from Cape Sōya, Hokkaido. Sakhalin is visible in the distance.

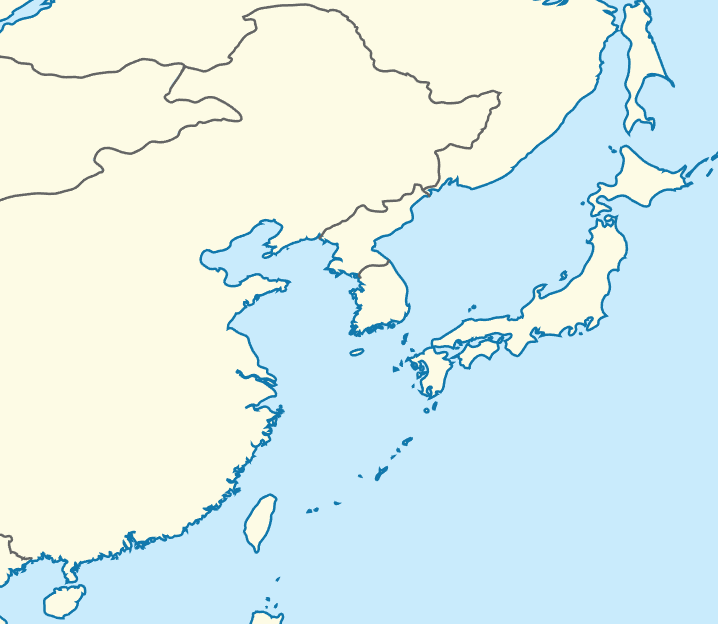
- Location within Eastern Asia
- Location: Sea of Japan – Sea of Okhotsk
- Type: Strait
- Part of: Pacific Ocean

La Pérouse Strait (Russian: пролив Лаперуза), or Sōya Strait (Japanese: 宗谷海峡, Hepburn: Sōya Kaikyō), is a strait dividing the southern part of the Russian island of Sakhalin from the northern part of the Japanese island of Hokkaidō, and connecting the Sea of Japan on the west with the Sea of Okhotsk on the east.

The strait is 42 km (26 mi) wide and 40 to 140 m (131 to 459 ft) deep. The narrowest part of the strait is in the west between Cape Crillion in Sakhalin and Cape Sōya in Hokkaidō, which is also the shallowest at only 60 metres (197 ft) deep. A small rocky island, appropriately named Kamen Opasnosti (Russian for "Rock of Danger") is located in the Russian waters in the northeastern part of the strait, 8 miles (13 km) southeast of Cape Crillion. Another small island, Bentenjima, lies near the Japanese shore of the strait.

The strait is named after Jean-François de Galaup, comte de Lapérouse, a French naval officer who explored it in 1787 as part of a round-the-world voyage.

Japan's territorial waters extend to three nautical miles into La Pérouse Strait instead of the usual twelve, reportedly to allow nuclear-armed United States Navy warships and submarines to transit the strait without violating Japan's prohibition against nuclear weapons in its territory.

== History ==
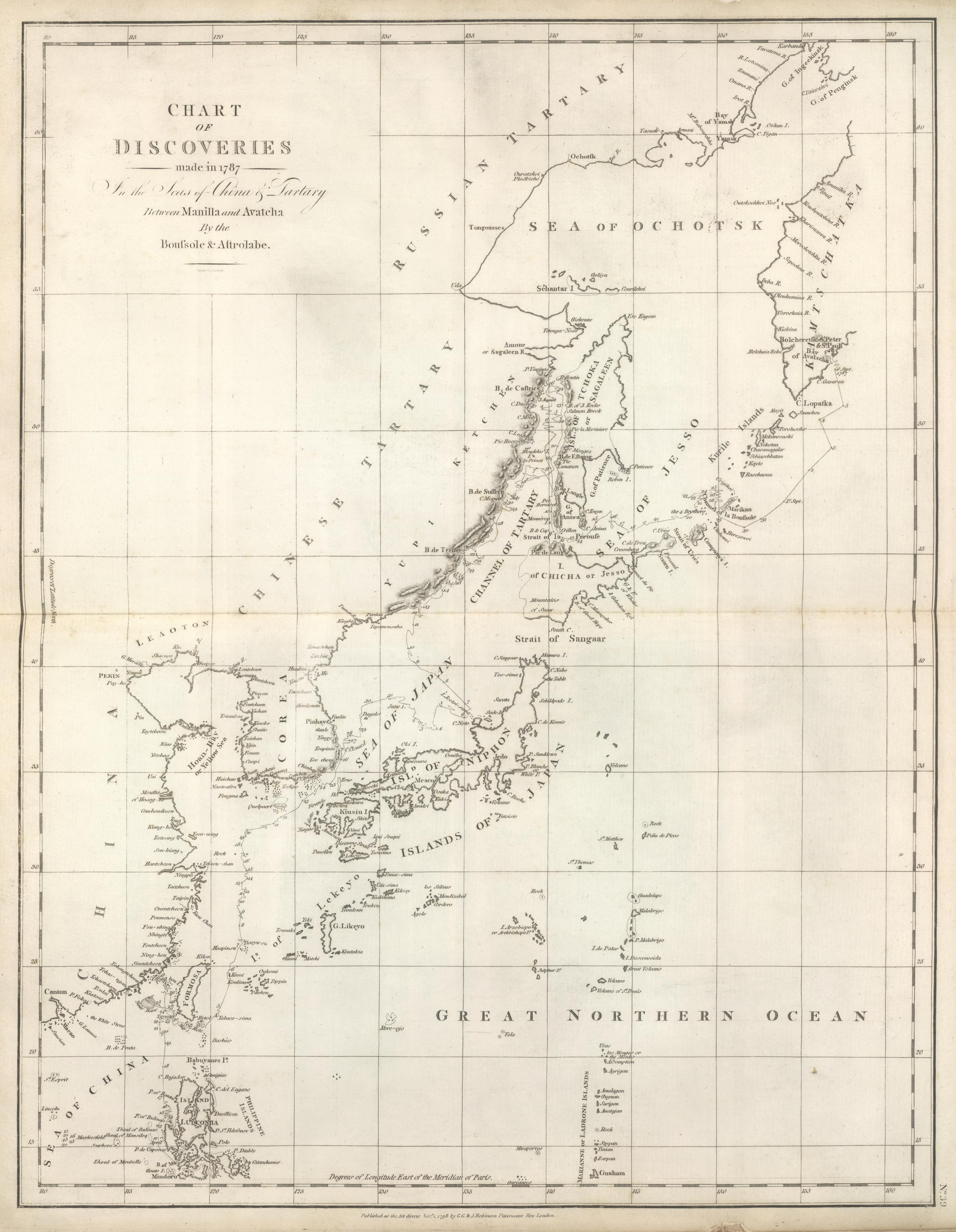
La Pérouse Strait charted by Lapérouse himself

Between 1848 and 1892, American whaleships passed through the strait in the spring and summer as they made their way from the right whale grounds in the Sea of Japan to the Sea of Okhotsk to hunt right and bowhead whales. The ship David Paddack (352 tons), Captain Swain, of Nantucket, was bound home with a full cargo when it wrecked in the strait in 1848.

The submarine USS Wahoo, skippered by Dudley W. "Mush" Morton, was sunk in the strait on her seventh war patrol in October 1943. The submarine's hull was found and identified as Wahoo on Oct. 31, 2006.

== Proposed rail crossing ==
The Sakhalin–Hokkaido Tunnel has been proposed to connect Japan and Russia under the Strait, further connecting to the Trans-Siberian Railroad. A bridge has also been proposed. As of 2018, neither have been completed.
