= Japanese transport ship Buyo Maru =

Japanese transport and hellship during World War II

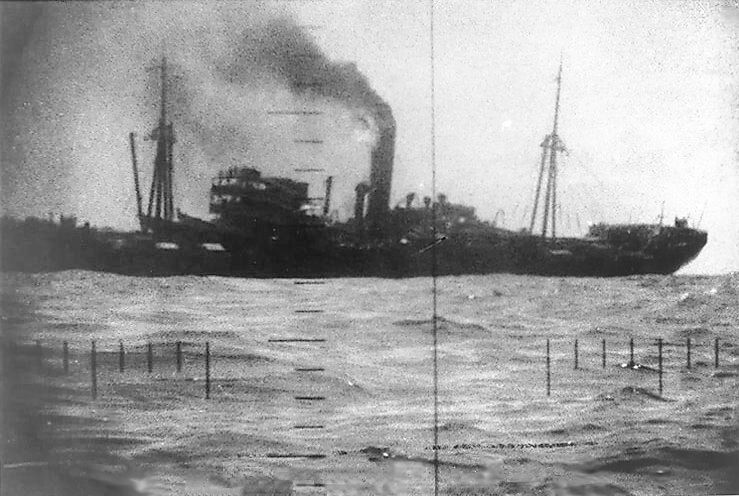
- Buyo Maru sinking

History

Empire of Japan
- Name: Buyo Maru (武洋丸)
- Owner: Kokusai Kisan Kaisha (1919-1932) Tamai Shosen K.K. (1932-1941)
- Builder: Asano Shipbuilding Company, Tsurumi
- Yard number: 10
- Laid down: 12 July 1918
- Launched: 5 February 1919
- Completed: 19 March 1919
- Identification: 24999
- Notes: Call sign: JPXD

Imperial Japanese Army
- Acquired: requisitioned by Imperial Japanese Army, 16 November 1941
- Fate: Torpedoed and sunk, 26 January 1943

General characteristics
- Class & type: Type B standard cargo ship
- Tonnage: 5,446 GRT; 3,405 NRT; 8,794 DWT
- Length: 121.92 m (400.0 ft)
- Beam: 16.15 m (53.0 ft)
- Draught: 9.75 m (32.0 ft)
- Propulsion: 2,800 ihp (2,100 kW)
- Speed: 12 knots (22 km/h; 14 mph)

Buyo Maru (Japanese:武洋丸) was a transport and hellship of the Imperial Japanese Army during World War II.

== History ==
The ship was laid down as hull number 364 on 12 July 1918 at the Tsurumi shipyard of Asano Shipbuilding Company for the benefit of the Kokusai Kisan Kaisha (玉井商船株式會社). She was the fourth ship of the Yoshida Maru No. 1 class of 25 standard cargo ships (referred to as Type B at the time) built by Asano Shipyard (one was built at the Uraga Dock Company) between 1918 and 1919. She was launched on 5 February 1919, completed on 19 March 1919, and given the name Buyo Maru (武洋丸) with the identification number 24999. On 12 July 1932, she was sold to Tamai Shosen K.K. of Kobe and registered in Hashidate.

On 16 November 1941, she was requisitioned by the Imperial Japanese Army.

== Fate ==
On 2 January 1943, she departed Singapore en route to Ambon as part of a convoy including fellow Imperial Japanese Army transports Pacific Maru and the Fukurei Maru No. 2. Buyo Maru was carrying 1,126 soldiers and 269 Indian prisoners of war (POWs) from the 16th Punjab Regiment. On 26 January 1943, the convoy was spotted by the US submarine Wahoo and Buyo Maru was torpedoed and sunk at 02°00′N 139°33′E. 195 Indian POWs and 87 Japanese died.

Following the sinking, the crew of USS Wahoo fired upon the survivors in the lifeboats. Vice Admiral Charles A. Lockwood later asserted that the survivors were Japanese soldiers who had turned machine-gun and rifle fire on the Wahoo after it surfaced, and that such resistance was common in submarine warfare. According to the submarine's executive officer, the fire was intended to force the Japanese soldiers to abandon the lifeboats and that none of them were deliberately targeted. Historian Clay Blair, however, has stated that the submarine's crew fired first and the shipwrecked survivors returned fire with handguns. The survivors were later determined to have included Allied POWs of the British Indian Army's 2nd Battalion, 16th Punjab Regiment, who were guarded by Japanese Army Forces from the 26th Field Ordnance Depot. Of 1,126 men originally aboard Buyo Maru, 195 Indians and 87 Japanese died, some killed during the torpedoing of the ship and some killed by the shootings afterwards.
