= USS Pompano (SS-181) =

Porpoise-class submarine of the US Navy

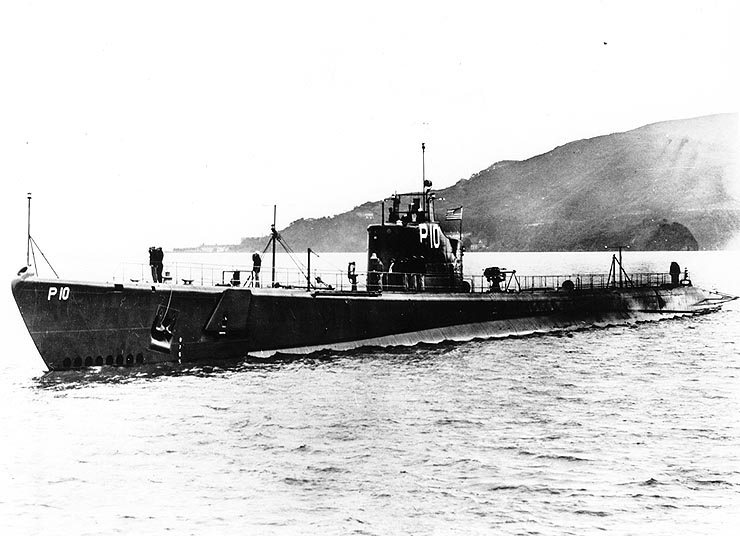
- USS Pompano (SS-181) in San Francisco Bay, California, 1938

History

United States
- Name: Pompano
- Builder: Mare Island Naval Shipyard
- Laid down: 14 January 1936
- Launched: 11 March 1937
- Commissioned: 12 June 1937
- Fate: Possibly struck a mine north of Honshū in September 1943

General characteristics
- Class & type: Porpoise-class submarine
- Displacement: 1,350 long tons (1,370 t) standard, surfaced, 1,997 long tons (2,029 t) submerged
- Length: 298 ft 0 in (90.83 m) (waterline), 300 ft 6 in (91.59 m) (overall)
- Beam: 25 ft 7/8 in (7.6 m)
- Draft: 13 ft 9 in (4.19 m)
- Propulsion: As Built: 4 × Hooven-Owens-Rentschler (H.O.R.) 8-cylinder double-acting diesel engines, 1,300 hp (970 kW) each, driving electrical generators, 2 × General Motors 6-241 four-cycle auxiliary diesels; Re-engined: 4 × Fairbanks-Morse Model 38D8 1/8 opposed piston diesels, 1,365 hp (1,018 kW) each; one Fairbanks-Morse Model 7-38A5 1/4 opposed piston auxiliary diesel, 2 × 120-cell Gould AMTX33HB batteries, 4 × high-speed Allis-Chalmers electric motors, 10,910 hp (8,140 kW) each, with 4.19:1 reduction gears, two shafts
- Speed: 19.25 kn (35.65 km/h) surfaced, 8.75 kn (16.21 km/h) submerged
- Range: 11,000 nmi (20,000 km) @ 10 kn (19 km/h), (bunkerage 92,801 US gal (351,290 L)
- Endurance: 10 hours @ 5 kn (9.3 km/h), 36 hours @ minimum speed submerged
- Test depth: 250 ft (76 m)
- Complement: As Built: 5 officers, 45 enlisted, 1945: 8 officers, 65 enlisted
- Armament: 6 × 21 in (530 mm) torpedo tubes (four forward, two aft; 16 torpedoes), 1 × 4 in (102 mm)/50 cal deck gun, 4 × 0.3 cal (7.62 mm) machineguns (2x2)

USS Pompano (SS-181), a United States Porpoise-class submarine, (Note: Alden considers Pompano as one of the Perch class, one of three related classes: the Porpoise, Shark and Perch classes. Wikipedia's article considers them the P1-, P-3 & P-5 sub-types of a single Porpoise class) was the second ship of the United States Navy to be named for the pompano.

== Construction and commissioning ==
Pompano's keel was laid down on 14 January 1936 by the Mare Island Navy Yard in California. She was launched on 11 March 1937, sponsored by Mrs. Isaac I. Yates, wife of Captain Isaac I. Yates, manager of Mare Island Navy Yard. Pompano was commissioned on 12 June 1937.

== Engine problems ==
Six boats were built in this group, with three different diesel engine designs from different makers. Pompano was fitted with H.O.R. (Hooven-Owens-Rentschler) 8-cylinder double-acting engines that were a license-built version of the MAN auxiliary engines of the cruiser Leipzig. Owing to the limited space available within the submarines, either opposed-piston or, in this case, double-acting engines were favoured for being more compact. Pompano's engines were a complete failure and were wrecked during trials before even leaving the Mare Island Navy Yard. Pompano was laid up for eight months until 1938 while the engines were replaced. Even then the engines were regarded as unsatisfactory and were replaced by Fairbanks-Morse opposed piston engines in 1942.

Pompano's engines were a unique prototype of the H.O.R. engine, having 8 cylinders. An inherent problem with double-acting cylinders, owing to the piston rod reducing the piston area on one side, is an imbalance in the force on each side of the piston. The H.O.R. engines were plagued by vibration and other problems as a result. While Pompano was still being built, the Salmon-class submarines were ordered. Three of these were built by Electric Boat, with a 9-cylinder development of the same H.O.R. engine. The 9-cylinder arrangement was an attempt to re-balance the engine, so reducing the overall effect of vibration across the engine. Although not as great a failure as Pompano's engines, this version was still troublesome and the boats were later re-engined with the same General Motors 16-248 two-stroke V16 Diesel engines as their sister boats. Other Electric Boat constructed submarines of the Sargo and Seadragon classes were also built with these 9-cylinder H.O.R. engines, but later re-engined.

== Service history ==
In the years preceding World War II, Pompano operated out of Mare Island off the West Coast of the United States, training her crew and patrolling in a constant state of readiness.

Although the submarine was awarded a battle star for the attack on Pearl Harbor, she had not yet arrived from Mare Island. Reaching port shortly after the attack, she sailed from Pearl Harbor on 18 December 1941 for her first war patrol, devoted mainly to reconnoitering the eastern Marshall Islands for an aircraft carrier strike in January. Aircraft from Enterprise bombed her in error on 20 December, but she escaped damage.

Pompano arrived off Wake Island on 1 January 1942 to gather intelligence, approaching close enough to see Japanese machine gun posts. On 8 January, "bedevilled by breakdowns in her temperamental H.O.R. engines" she inspected Bikar and subsequently viewed several other islands of the group.

She sighted several large ships protected by patrol craft in the harbor at Wotje. On 12 January, one of these stood out: Yawata, with four escorts. Pompano fired four Mark 14 torpedoes for two hits, and the target apparently broke up, disappearing from view. (Note: While Parks & ComSubPac believed she was sunk, JANAC doesn't credit it.) Five days later, when one of the patrol boats steamed out of the harbor, Pompano worked her way between him and the channel. Both torpedoes exploded prematurely (a constant problem for the Mark 6 exploder), foiling her first attack. Then, with the enemy charging directly for her, the submarine waited until her target was 1,000 yards (910 m) away before firing two more torpedoes "down the throat", the first attack of its kind by a United States submarine. The torpedoes missed, and the destroyer delivered an ineffective depth charging.

After thoroughly reconnoitering Maloelap, Pompano departed on 24 January, arriving at Pearl Harbor on 31 January. On the same day, aided by her reports, the fast carriers of the Pacific Fleet struck the Marshall Islands.

On her next patrol, to Japanese home waters, Pompano left Pearl Harbor on 20 April 1942 (with a load of older Mark 10 torpedoes, due to production shortages at Newport Torpedo Station), refueled at Midway Island, and entered her area 7 May patrolling the sea lanes west of Okinawa and in the East China Sea. Shipping was scarce, but on 24 May, she caught a large sampan and sent it down with gunfire. On the next day, after chasing for seven hours and fighting a motor fire in the process, she torpedoed Tokyo Maru, which exploded and sank.

As Pompano shifted her patrol area to the main route between Japan and the East Indies, a large transport escorted by one destroyer caught her eye on 30 May. Running to a position ahead of the convoy, she waited until her victim was only 750 yd (690 m) away, scoring solid hits (with two more Mark 10 torpedoes) which sank Atsuta Maru two and a half hours later.

With her fuel getting low and a strong possibility of not being able to refuel at Midway Island on the way back because of the Japanese attempt to invade the island, Pompano began to work eastward. On the morning of 3 June, she found a small inter-island steamer, setting the vessel afire with gunfire.

On 5 June, while on the shipping route between Japan and the Mariana Islands, the submarine caught a trawler and sank it with gunfire. Two days later, word arrived the Japanese fleet, decisively defeated in the Battle of Midway, was fleeing toward Japan. Pompano took up a position to intercept them, but made no contact. On 13 June 1942, she put into Midway for refueling, and on 18 June arrived in Pearl Harbor. She was credited with sinking five ships for a total of 16,500 tons; postwar, only two for 8,900 tons were confirmed.

After a refit - and a change of command, to Willis M. Thomas - she sailed from Pearl Harbor again on 19 July, bound for Japan, on her third war patrol. By 3 August, she was in her area, and began patrolling within four miles (7.5 km) of the coast. A few minutes past midnight on the morning of 7 August, she launched four torpedoes at a large freighter, but all missed.

Two days later, a destroyer sighted Pompano, and opened fire. As Pompano ducked under, shells could be heard hitting the water. Soon a heavy barrage of depth charges exploded close aboard. Rising water in the engine room necessitated starting the pumps, which brought another heavy barrage. After running aground twice while attempting to escape, wiping off the sonar heads and with her battery almost exhausted, she surfaced, determined to fight on, only 1,000 yd (910 m) from shore, evaded the ashcan and hastily cleared the area.

Undaunted, at noon on 12 August 1942, she dove and set up on a freighter, which was coming into position when Pompano sighted an enemy destroyer coming down between the sub and her target. Firing two torpedoes, Pompano's men heard two very loud explosions, and saw a huge column of spray and water through the periscope, blotting out the destroyer's bow at 700 yd (640 m). Both sets of screws stopped immediately. As Pompano closed the freighter, it settled below, evidently a victim of the second torpedo. (Note: Blair, makes no mention of it.)

Another attack on 21 August failed when a convoy escort kept Pompano down while three freighters passed. On the morning of 23 August, she launched another torpedo attack on a large passenger freighter, only to have all three torpedoes miss. The target replied with his deck gun. Surfacing after nightfall, the sub sighted a destroyer 7,000 yd (6,400 m) away but could not attack when the destroyer sighted her in turn, and launched depth charges close aboard.

The last attack of the patrol came while en route Midway when, on the 500-mile (800 km) circle from Tokyo, Pompano sighted Naval Auxiliary 163 lying to. Since the vessel was of shallow draft, and since there were no other enemy forces visible, the submarine surfaced and engaged with deck guns, sinking the enemy an hour later. Pompano sighted an unidentified periscope the next morning, but it disappeared before she could attack. The ship arrived Midway on 8 September and Pearl Harbor four days later. (Note: She would be credited with two ships sunk for 9,600 tons by JANAC.)

An overhaul at Mare Island Navy Yard, including the installation of new main engines, kept the ship in the yard until 18 December 1942. Sailing back to Pearl Harbor, she departed on her fourth war patrol on 16 January 1943. The Marshalls were her first objective, and at dawn on 25 January, she was off Kwajalein. After reconnoitering the area, she moved on to Truk to begin patrolling.

Catching a tanker with only one escort on 30 January, she damaged it with torpedoes. Another tanker came in view on 4 February, but only one of the stern torpedoes hit; damaged, it managed to make port. Moving back to the Marshalls, Pompano sighted another tanker on the morning of 18 February. Two hits slowed the Japanese down, but depth charging held Pompano down until her target had escaped. After reconnoitering Rongerik, Rongelap, and Bikini Atoll, she returned home, mooring at Midway on 28 February. She would get credit for no sinkings this time out.

She left Midway again on 19 March, bound for Tokyo. During the entire patrol, with 26 days on station, she sighted only four torpedo targets, one of them a submariner's dream, an aircraft carrier, identified as Shokaku. Pompano fired six torpedoes at long range 4,000 yd (3,700 m), and was credited with damage for 28,900 tons (denied postwar). (Note: By JANAC. It is likely the Mark XIVs prematured, as they did when Tunny attacked Taiyo in April.) She made only one other attack, spent two-thirds of the patrol fighting rough weather, and returned to Midway on 5 May, then to Pearl Harbor five days later.

On 6 June, the submarine was underway again from Pearl Harbor for the city of Nagoya, Japan. Stopping briefly at Midway to top up supplies, she entered her area on 19 June, patrolling across traffic lanes from Japan to the south. She celebrated the Fourth of July by putting two more torpedoes into a grounded ship, damaged by an earlier attack by Harder. Next day, she encountered a convoy, firing four torpedoes with no hits. On 7 July, she came upon two destroyers and, showing surprising aggressiveness, launched three torpedoes at each, missing every time. Two days after that, an ill-advised long shot at a three-ship convoy also missed, while on 10 July, a tanker escaped thanks to two erratic Mark 14s. (Note: By now, the Sub Force was saying, "two more".) Her last two torpedoes were extreme-range misses against a freighter. A good-sized sampan was sunk with gunfire on 17 July. Pompano ended the unsuccessful patrol at Midway on 28 July.

Pompano left Midway on 20 August, bound for Hokkaidō and Honshū. She was never heard from again, and when she failed to return, was presumed lost. The Japanese knew she was in her area, however, for two ships fell to her torpedoes during September: Akama Maru on 3 September, and Taiko Maru on 25 September. The enemy made no anti-submarine attacks during this period in Pompano's area, so newly-laid mines in the vicinity, not known to U.S. Navy intelligence until after she sailed, probably sank her. Pompano was stricken from the Naval Vessel Register on 12 January 1944.

The official version is that she was lost while patrolling off the coasts of Hokkaido and Honshu, probably to Japanese mines. The date usually given (27 September) is an approximate one. However Japanese records show that a submarine was sunk on 17 September by air attack off the Aomori Prefecture near Shiriya Zaki. Though it is not certain the boat was actually sunk here, it must be taken into consideration since it could only have been directed against Pompano since this was within her patrol area and there were no other submarines operating in that area. The Japanese said a seaplane based on Ominato attacked a surfaced sub which returned fire (this is critical since it leaves little doubt about what the plane attacked) then dived. The Japanese minelayer Ashizaki dropped depth charges the following day on a spot where oil was surfacing, bringing up more oil.

Notable events involving Pompano include:
| Date | Patrol | Commanding Officer | |
|---|---|---|---|
| 18 Dec 1941 | First | Lt.Cdr. Lewis Smith Parks | Left Pearl Harbor for her first war patrol, and was ordered to reconnoitre the eastern Marshall Islands. |
| 31 Jan 1942 | First | Lt.Cdr. Lewis Smith Parks | Ended her first war patrol when she returned to Pearl Harbor |
| 20 Apr 1942 | Second | Lt.Cdr. Lewis Smith Parks | Left Pearl Harbor for her second war patrol. She was ordered to patrol in the East China Sea. |
| 24 May 1942 | Second | Lt.Cdr. Lewis Smith Parks | Sank the Japanese fishing vessel Kotoku Maru with gunfire in position east of Formosa in position 25?16'N, 122?41'E. |
| 25 May 1942 | Second | Lt.Cdr. Lewis Smith Parks | Torpedoed and sank the Japanese tanker Tokyo Maru (902 GRT) some 70 nautical miles west of Naha, Okinawa in position 27?03'N, 127?03'E. |
| 30 May 1942 | Second | Lt.Cdr. Lewis Smith Parks | Torpedoed and sank the Japanese troop transport Atsuta Maru (7,983 GRT) east of Okinawa in position 26?07'N, 129?06'E. (see map) |
| 18 Jun 1942 | Second | Lt.Cdr. Lewis Smith Parks | Ended her second war patrol at Pearl Harbor. |
| 19 Jul 1942 | Third | Lt.Cdr. Willis Manning Thomas | Left Pearl Harbor for her third war patrol, and was ordered to patrol in Japanese home waters. |
| 4 Sep 1942 | Third | Lt.Cdr. Willis Manning Thomas | Sank the Japanese guard boat Nanshin Maru No. 27 (83 tons) with gunfire northeast of Honshu, Japan in position 35°22′N 151°40′E. Pompano also takes one survivor prisoner. |
| 12 Sep 1942 | Third | Lt.Cdr. Willis Manning Thomas | Ended her third war patrol at Pearl Harbor. She left for an overhaul at the Mare Island Navy Yard shortly afterwards. |
| 16 Jan 1943 | Fourth | Lt.Cdr. Willis Manning Thomas | With her overhaul completed, left Pearl Harbor for her 4th war patrol. She was ordered to patrol off the Marshall Islands. |
| 28 Feb 1943 | Fourth | Lt.Cdr. Willis Manning Thomas | Ended her fourth war patrol at Midway. |
| 19 Mar 1943 | Fifth | Lt.Cdr. Willis Manning Thomas | Leaves Midway for her 5th war patrol. She was ordered to patrol in Japanese home waters. |
| 10 May 1943 | Fifth | Lt.Cdr. Willis Manning Thomas | Ended her 5th war patrol at Pearl Harbor. |
| 6 Jun 1943 | Sixth | Lt.Cdr. Willis Manning Thomas | Left Pearl Harbor for her 6th war patrol, once again she was ordered to patrol in Japanese home waters. |
| 4 Jul 1943 | Sixth | Lt.Cdr. Willis Manning Thomas | Torpedoed and destroys the Japanese seaplane carrier Sagara Maru (7,189 GRT) on the coast of southern Honshu in position 34°38′N 137°53′E. The Sagara Maru was beached after an earlier attack by USS Harder on 22 June 1943. |
| 10 Jul 1943 | Sixth | Lt.Cdr. Willis Manning Thomas | Torpedoed and damaged the Japanese oiler Kyokuyo Maru (17,549 GRT, built 1938) off southern Honshu in position 33°34′N 136°07′E |
| 20 Jul 1943 | Sixth | Lt.Cdr. Willis Manning Thomas | Torpedoed and damaged the Japanese transport ship Uyo Maru (6,376 GRT) east of Miki Zaki, Honshu, Japan in position 33°55′N 136°26′E. |
| 28 Jul 1943 | Sixth | Lt.Cdr. Willis Manning Thomas | Ended her 6th war patrol at Midway. |
| 20 Aug 1943 | Seventh | Lt.Cdr. Willis Manning Thomas | Left Midway for her 7th war patrol. She was ordered to patrol in Japanese home waters off Hokkaido and Honshu. |
| 1 Sep 1943 | Seventh | Lt.Cdr. Willis Manning Thomas | Sank the Japanese merchant Nankai Maru (451 GRT) off Miyako, Japan. |
| 3 Sep 1943 | Seventh | Lt.Cdr. Willis Manning Thomas | sank the Japanese merchant Akama Maru (5,600 GRT) south-east of Hokkaido in position 41°00′N 144°34′E. |
| 9 Sep 1943 | Seventh | Lt.Cdr. Willis Manning Thomas | Torpedoed and damaged the Japanese transport ship Nanking Maru (3005 GRT) east of Honshu in position 40°12′N 141°55′E. |

Although the fate of the Pompano has been unknown for years, new evidence from Japan suggests it may have been hit by depth charges from members of the Japanese Navy following an oil slick on top of the water — which they took as an indication there was a submarine below. A possibility is that she was sunk on 17 September 1943, by a bomb and depth-charge attack in the Shiriyasaki Sea, off Aomori Prefecture, at northeast Honshu Island, by a Japanese seaplane and surface vessels. The seaplane spotted and attacked a surfaced submarine, which returned gunfire. Oil rose to the surface after the attack. Consecutive depth-charge attacks were then made by five surface vessels on the submerged submarine, which was stopped and possibly sunk. A Tabular Record of Movement for one of the Japanese surface vessels indicates the submarine was possibly the Pompano. (Ibid.; Also see: Holmes, Wilfred J., Double-Edged Secrets: U. S. Naval Intelligence Operations in the Pacific during World War II, p. 156; Hackett, Bob and Sander Kingsepp and Peter Cundall, "IJN Minelayer ISHIZAKI: Tabular Record of Movement," published online at http://www.combinedfleet.com/Ishizaki_t.htm (accessed on 11 October 2011); Miller, Vernon J., "U. S. Submarine Losses," issue 44, p. 46.)

== Awards ==
- Asiatic-Pacific Campaign Medal with seven battle stars for World War II service
