= Roma Victor =

2006 video game

- Developer(s): RedBedlam www.redbedlam.com
- Publisher(s): RedBedlam
- Designer(s): Kerry Fraser-Robinson
- Platform(s): Windows
- Release: July 2006
- Genre(s): Historical MMORPG
- Mode(s): Multiplayer

Roma Victor is an MMORPG based on the Roman Empire in Great Britain in the latter half of the 2nd century. Roma Victor was developed by RedBedlam Ltd. of Brighton and Hove, England. The in-game world was a 30x30km representation of a section along Hadrian's Wall, including several small villages and Roman forts.

Roma Victor was released by RedBedlam on July 14, 2006, with pre-order customers being let in 2 weeks earlier. In January 2010, it was announced that the purchase of new accounts would be blocked as of May 5, and that the game would remain online for another year after that, at RedBedlam's expense. However, the game was shut down almost 6 months early without warning.

== Setting ==
Exploring the wilderness in Caledonia.

Roma Victor was set in the province of Britannia just before the decline of the Roman Empire, beginning in the year 180AD. Commodus, having succeeded his father Marcus Aurelius as Emperor, was exerting a tyrannical influence across the empire.

From November 2006, the playable area encompassed the southeastern portion of Caledonia which was termed in-game as a playfield. As discussed by RedBedlam, there were further plans to expand this playable area and to create other playfields in different regions of the ancient world, if the server population had increased enough to warrant such extensions. These may have included playfields such as Germania, Hispania, Italy and Gaul, or other areas of Britannia. The additional playfields were never added, nor were some parts of southeastern Caledonia advertised as being in Roma Victor at commercial launch, such as the Roman town of Luguvalium.

In the final state of the game, the Romans began life as a slave in the ancient regional town of Corstopitum over which modern Corbridge lies. Barbarians began in the village of Erring, directly north of Corstopitum.

== Gameplay ==
=== Playable area and factions ===
A town meeting in Corstopitum.

There were two factions in Roma Victor, the Romans and the barbarians. Each faction had its own unique advantages and disadvantages.

The playfield was divided in boards, areas with the size of one square kilometer in a 1:1 scale to the real world. Some of these boards were pre-built, but most were composed of uninhabitable wilderness. The pre-built boards represented the historical locations of Roman colonies and forts, although creative license was also used to create fictitious places. Wilderness boards could be made buildable if a guild hall was built on that board.

When a player character first began the game, they were in attending status which meant they could not attack or be attacked by other players. They could be deattended instantly by a player who was the local magistrate, or by completing a tutorial. The deattending command used by the local lord or magistrate was intended to be a tool to prevent griefers from abusing the protections of attending status. However, due to the extremely repetitive, redundant, and monotonous tutorial, player lords and magistrates were burdened with the duty of deattending thousands of players who preferred not to complete the tutorial.

=== Guilds ===
Guilds were player associations, or "clans" and formed the basis of much of the social structure in Roma Victor. Guilds in Roma Victor were exclusively made up of players—the numbers could be augmented by NPC members, which could be hired and assigned to various roles and tasks, such as protecting the guild's members, carrying out assignments, or simply acting as a merchant on behalf of the guild.

Roman guild types included Auxiliary, Legion, Patron House and Patrician House. Barbarian guilds included Tribe and Warband, and there were also religious cult guilds which could contain both Roman and barbarian characters.

Every player also had their own household. Household was the collective term applied to all the buildings and NPCs owned, employed, and/or run by an individual player. There could be many buildings and NPCs within a household and using the built-in household management interface a player could set entry fees or rent fees on their property, assign NPCs to act as merchants or guards, summon NPCs as an escort, hire and dismiss staff, etc. NPCs were known to cause lag throughout the entire history of Roma Victor, to include significant adverse effects on game performance in the starter towns.

=== Skills and abilities ===
A player event in Erring, the barbarian starter town.

There were no character levels in Roma Victor. However, there was a 'skill' tree which replaced this function. Character development in Roma Victor was designed to simulate real life. That is, if a player wished to improve a character's woodcutting skill, this could only be accomplished by cutting trees down. From those trees, the player could then extract sticks and turn them into handles to train the character's preparing skill. Those handles could then be used by a smith to make simple tools.

Most craftable items could be made and used by anyone, butthere were certain items, like the lorica segmentata armour, that could only be made and worn by legionaries. Several items, like the hideshirt, could only be made and worn by barbarians. There were no level or skill restrictions, but the resulting item quality suffered greatly when a character was not a master in the required skills to produce the item. A player wishing to make high-quality items had to train by practicing menial tasks requiring the involved skill. A large number of items were never made craftable, including several weapon types and a majority of armor types.

Skill areas in Roma Victor included carpentry, smithing, construction, combat, farming, animal handling and more. In the Roman faction, a slave character earned citizenship after gaining a certain number of skill masteries and reputations.

Many branches of the skill tree were never implemented.

=== Crafting ===
Roma Victor featured a crafting system, in which it was possible to find resources and components that could be put together using the related skills.

Every item in the Roma Victor universe had a current quality level and a maximum quality level. The current quality level decreased as the item was used; the maximum quality level decreased as the item was repaired (bringing the current quality back up to the maximum quality level). If one forgot to repair the item it would eventually break and be lost. A warning of breakage was issued randomly when quality reached a low level.

=== Construction ===
Some player-built structures in Roma Victor.

Construction was largely the same as crafting, only with the greater need of materials and skills. When building anything from simple devices through to complex buildings like workshops, it was important to have a ready supply of skilled labour and a good supply chain to finish the job. NPC labourers could be hired to speed up the entire process, however it was possible for individual players to also provide a helping hand. Labourers could also "bulk-add" handcart-loads full of easy-to-add items, such as firewood, or even bricks to lengthy projects.

Roma Victor featured an open-ended 'sandbox'-style environment in which players could rent structures to live in, build their own, or let them out to other players. Any structure could be set as public or private.

The construction was basically divided between devices and structures. Devices were necessary in order to craft items, such as tools and weapons. Furnaces, workbenches, and kilns were examples of devices implemented during the last stages of the game. Structures were basically buildings that could serve as housing, storage areas, and advanced crafting workshops. Buildable player-made structures aside from guild halls included roundhouses, animal pens, arenas, workshops, and horreas. However, most advanced structures were never craftable by players. Tents could also be made as portable structures that could be transported in a character's inventory before deployment.

=== Combat ===
Combat skills were structured in a similar manner to crafting skills, in that an untrained character was very unlikely to win in a fair fight against a highly trained character, regardless of player skill and reflexes. A character automatically dodged and parried incoming strikes based on randomized calculations on the server, although blocking with a shield had both an automatic calculation and would happen if the opponent accidentally clicked on the player's shield. It was also possible to disarm an opponent's weapon during a fight.

Roma Victor featured real-time combat, which was largely decided by character skills similar to the character 'levels' found in most MMOs. However, unlike some other games, there were several tricks that were harder to pull off than just pushing a button. Timing and tactics also played a big role in your character's survival.

Roma Victor had hitboxes for each bodypart on a player, so that clicking the attack button while aiming the mouse on a particular part of an opponent's body would attempt to hit exactly that part of the body. After the character's automatic chance to evade the attack based on skill numbers, the attack damage would be applied to the hit points in that bodypart if the calculations failed. In this way, a player could repeatedly click at the weak or unarmoured parts on an opponent.

=== Death and the afterlife ===
Elysium in Roma Victor.

When the hitpoints of a particular bodypart reach zero, the player would become incapacitated. When incapacitated (i.e. knocked out) in combat, the player's character would not necessarily die straight away. He would be unconscious on the ground for a variable time, unless someone administered basic aid or a killing blow. If someone administered first aid, the character would be back on his feet and ready to fight in a few seconds, albeit severely wounded. If a deathblow was administered, then the player was taken away from the combat to Elysium, a small area for dead players. In Elysium, the player had to walk toward an NPC that would return the character to a designated spawn-in spot on the main gameworld. If a player was deathblown and had high skills, they may suffer decay. Player kills dealt more skill loss than other forms of death.

The Roma Victor website claimed that after death the player character would have to navigate their way through "fantastic landscapes, puzzles, physical challenges, demons and duels," varying in difficulty depending on the character's badges and reputations (life decisions), but this was never implemented.

Being deathblown was not the only way to die in Roma Victor. Other means of dying included drowning in a river if the character ran out of vigour whilst still swimming, bleeding to death after receiving a fatal wound without proper medical treatment, and suicide. If a player wished to commit suicide in the game, they could do so at any time. One attribute (muscle, vision, agility, dexterity, intuition, or stamina) would be completely zeroed.

=== Roman provincial law ===
Certain areas were well-policed by NPC representatives of Roman law, such as legionaries, who would attempt to uphold the law and prevent violence. In Roman settlements, it was impossible to break the laws, while in others a player could break the law but the NPC guards would, regardless of location, know of the act and respond later. Offending players would receive a "badge" upon their characters marking them as a criminal. The badge would be removed upon death or after a set amount of time.

Barbarians north of Hadrian's Wall were beyond the reach of the law altogether, so the barbarian lands were effectively a full PvP environment. There were no negative consequences for attacking other barbarians; aside from a reputation amongst fellow players.

== Subscription ==
There were no monthly subscription fees in Roma Victor. The game used a variant of the micropayment economic model, which consisted of buying in-game currency (known as sesterces) with real money through the VERM system. It was not possible to exchange virtual currency earned in-game into real world money.

== Development ==
Roma Victor was sporadically 'in development' since its release in 2006. While there had been many patches and some new content added, features such as player-built roads and fortifications, territorial conquest, and mounts were not implemented. Even at the time that the game was shut down, more than 4 years after release, a large number of features advertised as being available at commercial launch were still not in the game, and along with other features later advertised as part of future updates, were never developed and implemented. There were also a number of known critical bugs in game that were not fixed.

The speed of development and regular lack of customer support or communication was attributed by the creators to a relatively low budget and small development team. However, RedBedlam staff often worked on Roma Victor on a voluntary or part-time basis, a fact that was hidden from the community until several years after commercial launch.

=== RV2 ===
RV2, an overhaul of the Roma Victor client featuring improved graphics and gameplay, was announced in August 2009 to be implemented sometime in 2010. The developers stated that existing customers would be transferred over to the new version without a fee, as would existing buildings, characters and their belongings.

In January 2010, it was announced that the current Roma Victor would be shutting down in May 2011. It was stated that RV2 is still in development and may be released as soon as 2011. However, RedBedlam shut down the game in January 2011, almost 6 months early, without any prior announcement.

As of April 2021, RedBedlam had not released RV2 nor mentioned any development of such a project on its website.

== See also ==
- Wurm Online, a similar game
