= USS R-5 =

R-class submarine of the United States

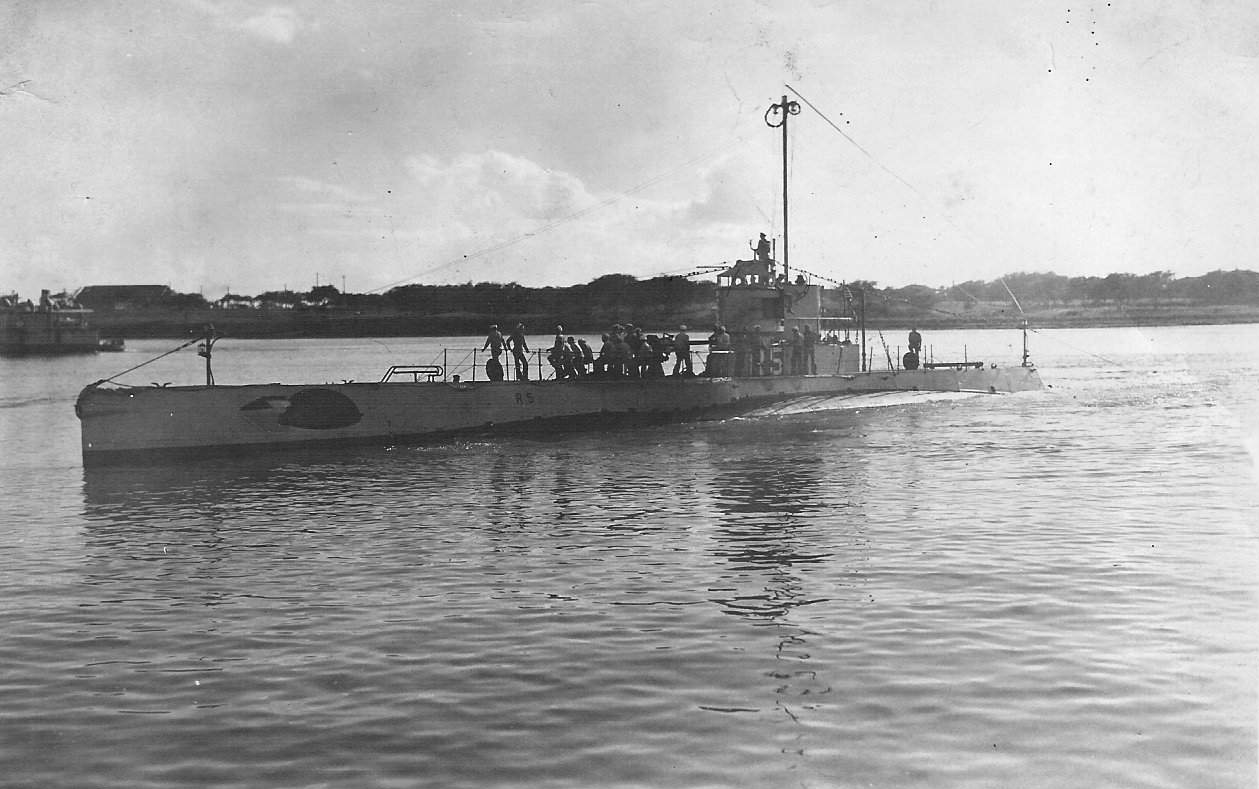
- USS R-5 (SS-82) entering harbor in the Territory of Hawaii, c. 1923–1930

History

United States
- Name: R-5
- Ordered: 29 August 1916
- Builder: Fore River Shipbuilding Company, Quincy, Massachusetts
- Cost: $712,685.48 (hull and machinery)
- Laid down: 16 October 1917
- Launched: 24 November 1918
- Sponsored by: Miss Margaretta Wood
- Commissioned: 15 April 1919
- Decommissioned: 14 September 1945
- Stricken: 11 October 1945
- Identification: Hull symbol: SS-82 (17 July 1920); Call sign: NILJ
- Fate: Sold for scrap, 22 August 1946

General characteristics
- Class & type: R-1-class submarine
- Displacement: 574 long tons (583 t) surfaced; 685 long tons (696 t) submerged
- Length: 186 feet 3 inches (56.77 m)
- Beam: 18 ft (5.5 m)
- Draft: 15 ft 6 in (4.72 m)
- Installed power: 880 brake horsepower (656 kW) diesel; 934 hp (696 kW) electric
- Propulsion: 2 × NELSECO 6-EB-14 diesel engines; 2 × Electro-Dynamic Company electric motors; 2 × 60-cell batteries; 2 × Propellers
- Speed: 12.5 knots (23.2 km/h; 14.4 mph) surfaced; 9.3 kn (17.2 km/h; 10.7 mph) submerged
- Range: 4,700 nautical miles (8,700 km; 5,400 mi) at 6.2 kn (11.5 km/h; 7.1 mph), 7,000 nmi (13,000 km; 8,100 mi) if fuel loaded into the main ballast tanks
- Test depth: 200 ft (61 m)
- Capacity: 18,880 US gallons (71,500 L; 15,720 imp gal) fuel
- Complement: 2 officers; 27 enlisted
- Armament: 4 × 21-inch (533 mm) torpedo tubes (8 torpedoes); 1 × 3-inch (76 mm)/50-caliber deck gun

USS R-5 (SS-81), also known as "Submarine No. 81", was an R-1-class coastal and harbor defense submarines of the United States Navy commissioned after the end of World War I.

Due to space constraints, the boats built at the Fore River Shipbuilding Company yard, were laid down much later than the boats built at the Union Iron Works and the Lake Torpedo Boat Company yards. Because of this, none were commissioned before the end of WWI.

== Design ==
The R-boats built by the Fore River Shipbuilding Company, R-1 through R-14, and the Union Iron Works, R-15 through R-20, are sometimes considered a separate class, R-1-class, from those built by the Lake Torpedo Boat Company, R-21 through R-27, R-21-class.

The submarines had a length of 186 feet 3 inches (56.8 m) overall, a beam of 18 ft (5.5 m), and a mean draft of 15 ft 6 in (4.7 m). They displaced 574 long tons (583 t) on the surface and 685 long tons (696 t) submerged. The R-1-class submarines had a crew of 2 officers and 27 enlisted men. They had a diving depth of 200 ft (61.0 m).

For surface running, the boats were powered by two 440-brake-horsepower (328 kW) NELSECO 6-EB-14 diesel engines, each driving one propeller shaft. When submerged each propeller was driven by a 467-horsepower (348 kW) Electro-Dynamic Company electric motor. They could reach 12.5 knots (23.2 km/h; 14.4 mph) on the surface and 9.3 kn (17.2 km/h; 10.7 mph) underwater. On the surface, the R-1-class had a range of 4,700 nautical miles (8,700 km; 5,400 mi) at 6.2 kn (11.5 km/h; 7.1 mph), or 7,000 nmi (13,000 km; 8,100 mi) if fuel was loaded into their main ballast tanks.

The boats were armed with four 21-inch (533 mm) torpedo tubes in the bow. They carried four reloads, for a total of eight torpedoes. The R-1-class submarines were also armed with a single 3 in (76 mm)/50 caliber deck gun.

== Construction ==
R-5's keel was laid down on 16 October 1917, by the Fore River Shipbuilding Company, Quincy, Massachusetts. She was launched on 24 November 1918, sponsored by Miss Margaretta Wood, and commissioned on 15 April 1919.

== Service history ==
=== 1919–1932 ===
After completion at the Boston Navy Yard, R-5 got underway on 28 April 1919, for New London, Connecticut, where she was assigned to Submarine Division 9, of the Atlantic Fleet. She headed south on 4 December, for Norfolk, Virginia, and winter exercises with her division in the Gulf of Mexico, from 21 January to 14 April 1920. R-5 later returned to Newport, Rhode Island, on 18 May, for four months of summer training in New England waters.

When the US Navy adopted its hull classification system on 17 July 1920, she received the hull number SS-81.

She sailed 13 September 1920, for Norfolk, and an overhaul that was completed in April 1921. In company with the submarine tender Camden (AS-6), R-5 was ordered to the Pacific Ocean, on 11 April 1921, transited the Panama Canal, on 28 May, and arrived on 30 June, at her new base, San Pedro, California.

In January 1923, she was used in the filming of the Twentieth Century-Fox motion picture The Eleventh Hour, and engaged in war games with the battle fleet in the Gulf of Fonseca, from 5 February to 6 April 1923.

She was transferred on 16 July, along with Division 9, to Pearl Harbor, where she was based for the next eight years engaged in training and operations with fleet units. R-5 made an endurance run to Midway Island, in July and August 1924. In December, during division exercises off Pearl Harbor, she rammed her sister boat R-16, in the after battery room, causing extensive damage to both ships.

R-5 was transferred back to the Atlantic, on 12 December 1930, with Divisions 9 and 14. She transited the Panama Canal, on 28 January 1931, and arrived at New London, on 9 February. She was assigned to Division 4, on 1 April, and acted as training ship for the Submarine School, until sailing on 28 April 1932, for the Philadelphia Navy Yard, where she decommissioned on 30 June 1932.

=== 1940–1946 ===
After recommissioning on 19 August 1940, R-5 reported to Division 42, at New London, on 30 October. She sailed on 10 December, for the submarine base at Coco Solo, in the Panama Canal Zone, where she was assigned patrol duty in the Bay of Panama, until returning to New London, on 31 October 1941. She underwent overhaul, and in December, relieved R-1 on patrol along the Bermuda-New England shipping lanes. Through the U-boat offensives of 1942, she maintained those patrols, operating out of New London and Bermuda, and alternating them with anti-submarine training operations for destroyers and destroyer escorts. Twice, during the first part of the year, she made contact with U-boats, and once, on 10 February, fired torpedoes, but none found its mark.

== Fate ==
From 1943 into 1945, R-5 continued to rotate between New London and Bermuda. After the end of World War II, she was ordered to Portsmouth, New Hampshire, for inactivation. Arriving on 6 September 1945, she decommissioned on 14 September, and was struck from the Naval Vessel Register on 11 October 1945. On 22 August 1946, R-5 was sold for scrap to John J. Duane of Quincy, Massachusetts.

== Bibliography ==
- "Table 21 - Ships on Navy List June 30, 1919". Congressional Serial Set. U.S. Government Printing Office: 770. 1921.
- Friedman, Norman (1995). U.S. Submarines Through 1945: An Illustrated Design History. Annapolis, Maryland: Naval Institute Press. ISBN 1-55750-263-3.
- Priolo, Gary. "R-5 (SS-82)". Navsource.net.
- Gardiner, Robert & Gray, Randal (1985). Conway's All the World's Fighting Ships 1906–1921. Annapolis, Maryland: Naval Institute Press. ISBN 0-85177-245-5.
- "R-5". Dictionary of American Naval Fighting Ships. Navy Department, Naval History and Heritage Command. This article incorporates text from this source, which is in the public domain.
- Hall, Anne Martin (1925). Ships of the United States navy and their sponsors, 1913-1923.
