= List of ship launches in 1916 =

The list of ship launches in 1916 includes a chronological list of ships launched in 1916. In cases where no official launching ceremony was held, the date built or completed may be used instead.

Date	Ship	Class / type	Builder	Location	Country	Notes
1 January	Artisan		Bethlehem Sparrows Point	Sparrows Point, Maryland	United States	For American-Hawaiian Steamship Company.
8 January	Repulse	Renown-class battlecruiser	John Brown & Company	Clydebank	United Kingdom	For Royal Navy.
15 January	Bristol	Collier	New York Shipbuilding	Camden, New Jersey	United States	For Coastwise Transportation Co.
15 January	P25	Patrol boat	Harland & Wolff	Govan	United Kingdom	For .Royal Navy
31 January	Karlsruhe	Königsberg-class cruiser		KielKaiserliche Werft	Germany	For Imperial German Navy.
1 February	Emden	Königsberg-class cruiser	AG Weser	Bremen	Germany	For Imperial German Navy.
2 February	J4	J-class submarine	Pembroke Dockyard	Pembroke Dock	United Kingdom	For Royal Navy.
5 February	Courageous	Courageous-class battlecruiser	Armstrong Whitworth	Newcastle upon Tyne	United Kingdom	For Royal Navy.
5 February	Los Angeles	Tanker	Union Iron Works	San Francisco, California	United States	For Union Oil of California.
29 February	Arborean	Cargo ship	Bethlehem Sparrows Point	Sparrows Point, Maryland	United States	For American-Hawaiian Steamship Company.
1 March	Sucrosa	Molasses carrier	Fore River Shipyard	Quincy, Massachusetts	United States	For Cuba Distilling Co.
4 March	Renown	Renown-class battlecruiser	Fairfield Shipbuilding and Engineering Company	Govan	United Kingdom	For Royal Navy.
4 March	Sampson	Sampson-class destroyer	Fore River Shipyard	Quincy, Massachusetts	United States	For United States Navy.
4 March	City of Camden	Steamboat	Harlan & Hollingsworth	Wilmington, Delaware	United States	For Wilmington Steamboat Co.
15 March	Standard Arrow	Tanker	New York Shipbuilding	Camden, New Jersey	United States	For Standard Transportation Co.
16 March	L-10	L-class submarine	Fore River Shipyard	Quincy, Massachusetts	United States	For United States Navy.
20 March	Margaret	Cargo ship	Bethlehem Sparrows Point	Sparrows Point, Maryland	United States	For A. H. Bull & Co.
22 March	Mantola	Passenger ship	Barclay Curle	Scotstoun	United Kingdom	For British-India Steam Navigation Company.
23 March	Rowan	Sampson-class destroyer	Fore River Shipyard	Quincy, Massachusetts	United States	For United States Navy.
28 March	Deutschland	Merchant submarine	Flensburger Schiffbau-Gesellschaft	Flensburg	Germany	For Deutsche Ozean-Reederei.
31 March	Foca	Foca-class submarine	FIAT-San Giorgio	La Spezia	Italy	For Portuguese Navy.
2 April	F1	F-class submarine	FIAT-San Giorgio	La Spezia	Italy	For Italian Regia Marina (Royal Navy)
10 April	Munplace	Cargo ship	Bethlehem Sparrows Point	Sparrows Point, Maryland	United States	For Munson Steamship Company.
14 April	Nürnberg	Königsberg-class cruiser	Howaldtswerke	Kiel	Germany	For Imperial German Navy.
15 April	Cubadist	Molasses carrier	Fore River Shipyard	Quincy, Massachusetts	United States	For Cuba Distilling Co.
18 April	Geo. E. Paddleford	Tanker	Harlan & Hollingsworth	Wilmington, Delaware	United States	For Pan-American Petroleum.
19 April	Marconi	Cargo ship	Harland & Wolff	Belfast	United Kingdom	For Lamport and Holt.
20 April	Aréthuse	Amphitrite-class submarine	Arsenal de Toulon	Toulon	France	For French Navy
20 April	Glorious	Courageous-class battlecruiser	Harland and Wolff	Govan	United Kingdom	For Royal Navy.
20 April	Patriot	Thornycroft M-class destroyer	John I. Thornycroft & Company	Woolston	United Kingdom	For Royal Navy.
20 April	Starlite	Schooner, tanker	Toledo Shipbuilding Company	Toledo, Ohio	United States	For Standard Oil of New Jersey.
29 April	Acme	Tanker	Union Iron Works	San Francisco, California	United States	For Standard Transportation Co of Delaware.
29 April	Moonlite	Auxiliary schooner, tanker	Toledo Shipbuilding Company	Toledo, Ohio	United States	For Standard Oil of New Jersey.
29 April	Munsomo	Cargo ship	Bethlehem Sparrows Point	Sparrows Point, Maryland	United States	For Munson Steamship Company.
1 May	L-5	United States L-class submarine	Lake Torpedo Boat	Bridgeport, Connecticut	United States	For United States Navy.
2 May	Glenamoy	Cargo ship	Harland & Wolff	Belfast	United Kingdom	For Glen Line.
16 May	L-11	United States L-class submarine	Fore River Shipyard	Quincy, Massachusetts	United States	For United States Navy.
17 May	Hudworth	Cargo ship	Blyth Shipbuilding & Dry Docks Co. Ltd	Blyth	United Kingdom	For Trechmann Steamship Co. Ltd.
18 May	HMS Terror	Monitor	Harland & Wolff	Govan	United Kingdom	For Royal Navy.
18 May	Wilkes	Sampson-class destroyer	William Cramp & Sons	Philadelphia, Pennsylvania	United States	For United States Navy.
1 June	Edward Luckenbach	Cargo ship	Fore River Shipyard	Quincy, Massachusetts	United States	For Luckenbach Steamship Company. (or 14 September)
3 June	D. G. Scofield	Tanker	Union Iron Works	San Francisco, California	United States	For Standard Oil of California.
4 June	F2	F-class submarine	FIAT-San Giorgio	La Spezia	Italy	For Italian Regia Marina (Royal Navy)
5 June	Patrician	Thornycroft M-class destroyer	John I. Thornycroft & Company	Woolston	United Kingdom	For Royal Navy.
15 June	G9	G-class submarine	Naval Construction Yard	Barrow-in-Furness	United Kingdom	For Royal Navy.
17 June	Aubretia	Aubretia-class sloop	Blyth Shipbuilding & Dry Docks Co. Ltd	Blyth	United Kingdom	For Royal Navy.
17 June	Sloyne	Steamship	I. J. Abdela & Mitchell Ltd.	Queensferry	United Kingdom	For Alexandra Towing Co. Ltd.
18 June	Davanger	Cargo ship	Union Iron Works	San Francisco, California	United States	For Wilhelm Tarkeldson.
19 June	HMS Erebus	Monitor	Harland & Wolff	Govan	United Kingdom	For Royal Navy.
20 June	Frøya	Minelayer	Karljohansvern	Horten	Norway	For Royal Norwegian Navy.
1 July	Bramell Point	Tanker	Baltimore Dry Docks & Shipbuilding Company	Baltimore, Maryland	United States	For Vacuum Oil.
1 July	Pearl Shell	Tanker	Harlan & Hollingsworth	Wilmington, Delaware	United States	For Shell Co. of California.
3 July	Newbury	Racecourse-class minesweeper	A & J Inglis	Glasgow	United Kingdom	For Royal Navy.
5 July	Unnamed	Carfloat	New York Shipbuilding	Camden, New Jersey	United States	For New York Central Railroad.
6 July	F3	F-class submarine	FIAT-San Giorgio	La Spezia	Italy	For Italian Regia Marina (Royal Navy)
16 July	Aurania	Ocean liner	Swan Hunter & Wigham Richardson	Wallsend	United Kingdom	For Cunard Line.
22 July	Isaac Peral	Submarine			Spain	For Spanish Navy.
28 July	Kanguro	Submarine rescue ship	Werf Conrad	Haarlem	Netherlands	For Spanish Navy.
29 July	Twilite	Schooner, tanker	Toledo Shipbuilding Company	Toledo, Ohio	United States	For Standard Oil of New Jersey.
3 August	Cornelia	Cargo ship	Bethlehem Sparrows Point	Sparrows Point, Maryland	United States	For Bull Insular Co.
6 August	Paulsboro	Tanker	Union Iron Works	San Francisco, California	United States	For Vacuum Oil.
12 August	F5	F-class submarine	FIAT-San Giorgio	La Spezia	Italy	For Italian Regia Marina (Royal Navy)
15 August	Davis	Sampson-class destroyer	Bath Iron Works	Bath, Maine	United States	For United States Navy.
15 August	Furious	Courageous-class battlecruiser	Armstrong Whitworth	Newcastle upon Tyne	United Kingdom	For Royal Navy.
17 August	Unnamed	Carfloat	New York Shipbuilding	Camden, New Jersey	United States	For New York Central Railroad.
19 August	Golfinho	Foca-class submarine	FIAT-San Giorgio	La Spezia	Italy	For Portuguese Navy.
19 August	Hidra	Foca-class submarine	FIAT-San Giorgio	La Spezia	Italy	For Portuguese Navy.
20 August	Astral	Tanker	Union Iron Works	San Francisco, California	United States	For Standard Transportation Co of Delaware. (or 29 August)
31 August	L-6	L-class submarine	Craig Shipbuilding	Long Beach, California	United States	For United States Navy.
August (unknown date)	Malmanger	Tanker	Chester Shipbuilding Company	Chester, Pennsylvania	United States	For Westfal Larsen.
12 September	Brecknockshire	Cargo ship	Harland & Wolff	Belfast	United Kingdom	For Royal Mail Line.
12 September	Ramillies	Revenge-class battleship	William Beardmore and Company	Glasgow	United Kingdom	For Royal Navy.
12 September	Paris	Ocean liner	Chantiers et Ateliers de Saint‑Nazaire–Penhoët	Saint-Nazaire	France	For Compagnie Générale Transatlantique;
14 September	Munrio	Cargo ship	Bethlehem Sparrows Point	Sparrows Point, Maryland	United States	For Munson Steamship Company.
16 September	Pennant	Tanker	Baltimore Dry Docks & Shipbuilding Company	Baltimore, Maryland	United States	For Pierce Oil Corporation.
17 September	F11	F-class submarine	FIAT-San Giorgio	La Spezia	Italy	For Italian Regia Marina (Royal Navy)
21 September	Niels Nielsen	Cargo ship	Skinner & Eddy	Seattle, Washington	United States	For B. Stolt Nielsen .
23 September	Cauto	Cargo liner	Seattle Construction and Dry Dock Company	Seattle, Washington	United States	For New York & Cuba Mail Steamship Co.
24 September	F9	F-class submarine	FIAT-San Giorgio	La Spezia	Italy	For Italian Regia Marina (Royal Navy)
28 September	DX 7	Landing craft	Blyth Shipbuilding & Dry Docks Co. Ltd	Blyth	United Kingdom	For Royal Navy.
28 September	DX 8	Landing craft	Blyth Shipbuilding & Dry Docks Co. Ltd	Blyth	United Kingdom	For Royal Navy.
28 September	DX 9	Landing craft	Blyth Shipbuilding & Dry Docks Co. Ltd	Blyth	United Kingdom	For Royal Navy.
28 September	DX 10	Landing craft	Blyth Shipbuilding & Dry Docks Co. Ltd	Blyth	United Kingdom	For Royal Navy.
28 September	L-7	L-class submarine	Craig Shipbuilding	Long Beach, California	United States	For United States Navy.
29 September	Helen	Cargo ship	Bethlehem Sparrows Point	Sparrows Point, Maryland	United States	For Bull Insular Co.
5 October	Cöln	Cöln-class cruiser	Blohm & Voss	Hamburg	Germany	For Imperial German Navy.
7 October	Salmon	Destroyer	Harland & Wolff	Belfast	United Kingdom	For Royal Navy.
11 October	Georgeanna Weems	Cargo ship	Harlan & Hollingsworth	Wilmington, Delaware	United States	ForBaltimore & Carolina Steamship Co .
14 October	Rosalind	R-class destroyer	John I. Thornycroft & Company	Woolston	United Kingdom	For Royal Navy.>
14 October	Capto	Cargp ship	Moore Dry Dock Company	Oakland, California	United States	For B. Stolt Nielsen.
19 October	F10	F-class submarine	FIAT-San Giorgio	La Spezia	Italy	For Italian Regia Marina (Royal Navy)
20 October	Dawnlite	Schooner, tanker	Toledo Shipbuilding Company	Toledo, Ohio	United States	For Standard Oil of New Jersey.
21 October	Pola	Barque	Blohm & Voss	Hamburg	Germany	For F. Laeisz.
21 October	Panuco	Cargo liner	Seattle Construction and Dry Dock Company	Seattle, Washington	United States	For New York & Cuba Mail Steamship Co.
21 October	Hanna Nielsen	Cargo ship	Skinner & Eddy	Seattle, Washington	United States	For B. Stolt Nielsen.
24 October	H. C. Folger	Tanker	Union Iron Works	San Francisco, California	United States	For Atlantic Oils Refining Co.
28 October	Holden Evans	Tanker	Baltimore Dry Docks & Shipbuilding Company	Baltimore, Maryland	United States	ForBulk Oil Transportation Co .
26 October	Sheaf Don	Cargo ship	Blyth Shipbuilding & Dry Docks Co. Ltd	Blyth	United Kingdom	For Sheaf Steam Shipping Co. Ltd.
28 October	Sunlite	Schooner, Tanker	Toledo Shipbuilding Company	Toledo, Ohio	United States	For Standard Oil of New Jersey.
30 October	Royal Arrow	Tanker	New York Shipbuilding	Camden, New Jersey	United States	For Standard Transportation Co.
8 November	Millais	Cargo ship	Harland & Wolff	Belfast	United Kingdom	For Lamport & Holt.
9 November	Unnamed	Carfloat	New York Shipbuilding	Camden, New Jersey	United States	For New York Central Railroad.
11 November	K13	K-class submarine	Fairfield Shipbuilding and Engineering Company	Govan	United Kingdom	For Royal Navy.
11 November	Talabot	Cargo ship	Union Iron Works	San Francisco, California	United States	For N. S. Bjoeness.
11 November	Daylite	Schooner, Tanker	Toledo Shipbuilding Company	Toledo, Ohio	United States	For Standard Oil of New Jersey.
12 November	Ise	Ise-class battleship	Kawasaki Heavy Industries	Kobe	Japan	For Imperial Japanese Navy.
13 November	F8	F-class submarine	FIAT-San Giorgio	La Spezia	Italy	For Italian Regia Marina (Royal Navy)
15 November	Sylph	Destroyer	Harland & Wolff	Govan	United Kingdom	For Royal Navy.
19 November	F4	F-class submarine	Orlando	Livorno	Italy	For Italian Regia Marina (Royal Navy)
21 November	Sachsen	Bayern-class battleship	Friedrich Krupp Germaniawerft	Kiel	Germany	For Imperial German Navy.
25 November	Golaa	Tanker	Chester Shipbuilding Company	Chester, Pennsylvania	United States	For Frithi Stegwarth.
25 November	Radiant	R-class destroyer	John I. Thornycroft & Company	Woolston	United Kingdom	For Royal Navy.
26 November	J. W. VanDyke	Tanker	Union Iron Works	San Francisco, California	United States	For Atlantic Oils Refining Co.
27 November	N-4	N-class submarine	Lake Torpedo Boat	Bridgeport, Connecticut	United States	For United States Navy.
30 November	F12	F-class submarine	FIAT-San Giorgio	La Spezia	Italy	For Italian Regia Marina (Royal Navy)
5 December	Allen	Sampson-class destroyer	Bath Iron Works	Bath, Maine	United States	For United States Navy.
5 December	Unnamed	Carfloat	New York Shipbuilding	Camden, New Jersey	United States	For New York Central Railroad.
9 December	Shaw	Sampson-class destroyer	Mare Island Navy Yard	Vallejo, California	United States	For United States Navy.
20 December	Unnamed	Tanker	Baltimore Dry Docks & Shipbuilding Company	Baltimore, Maryland	United States	For Bulk Oil Transportation Co.
23 December	F7	F-class submarine	FIAT-San Giorgio	La Spezia	Italy	For Italian Regia Marina (Royal Navy)
23 December	Julia Luckenbach		Fore River Shipyard	Quincy, Massachusetts	United States	For Luckenbach Steamship Co.
23 December	Maui	Passenger ship	Union Iron Works	San Francisco, California	United States	For Matson Navigation Company .
30 December	N-1	N-class submarine	Seattle Construction and Drydock Company	Seattle, Washington	United States	For United States Navy.
Unknown date	AC. 1053	Barge	Blyth Shipbuilding & Dry Docks Co. Ltd	Blyth	United Kingdom	For Inland Water Transport Directorate.
Unknown date	Addie	Tug	Abdela & Mitchell Ltd.	Brimscombe	United Kingdom	For private owner.
Unknown date	E 380	Barge	Frederick Braby & Co. Ltd.	Deptford	United Kingdom	For Inland Water Transport Directorate.
Unknown date	E 384	Barge	Frederick Braby & Co. Ltd.	Deptford	United Kingdom	For Inland Water Transport Directorate.
Unknown date	E 385	Barge	Frederick Braby & Co. Ltd.	Deptford	United Kingdom	For Inland Water Transport Directorate.
Unknown date	E 386	Barge	Frederick Braby & Co. Ltd.	Deptford	United Kingdom	For Inland Water Transport Directorate.
Unknown date	E 388	Barge	Frederick Braby & Co. Ltd.	Deptford	United Kingdom	For Inland Water Transport Directorate.
Unknown date	E 389	Barge	Frederick Braby & Co. Ltd.	Deptford	United Kingdom	For Inland Water Transport Directorate.
Unknown date	E 390	Barge	Frederick Braby & Co. Ltd.	Deptford	United Kingdom	For Inland Water Transport Directorate.
Unknown date	E 391	Barge	Frederick Braby & Co. Ltd.	Deptford	United Kingdom	For Inland Water Transport Directorate.
Unknown date	E 392	Barge	Frederick Braby & Co. Ltd.	Deptford	United Kingdom	For Inland Water Transport Directorate.
Unknown date	Giove	Tanker	Cantiere Navale Riuniti.	Palermo	Italy	For Marina Militare.
Unknown date	Leersum	Cargo ship	Vuik & Son	Capelle aan den IJssel	Netherlands	For private owner.
Unknown date	Mytilus	Tanker	Swan, Hunter & Wigham Richardson Ltd.	Newcastle upon Tyne	United Kingdom	For Anglo-Saxon Petroleum Co. Ltd.
Unknown date	Ruth	Sternwheeler	Alabama Drydock and Shipbuilding Company	Mobile, Alabama	United States	For private owner.
Unknown date	Tommy Atkins	Tug	Frederick Braby & Co. Ltd.	Deptford	United Kingdom	For T. H. Pearce.
Unknown date	Usedom	Tanker	Howaldtswerke.	Kiel	Germany	For private owner.
Unknown date	W.E. 8	Water barge	Frederick Braby & Co. Ltd.	Deptford	United Kingdom	For Inland Water Transport Directorate.
