= USS N-6 =

N-class submarine of the United States

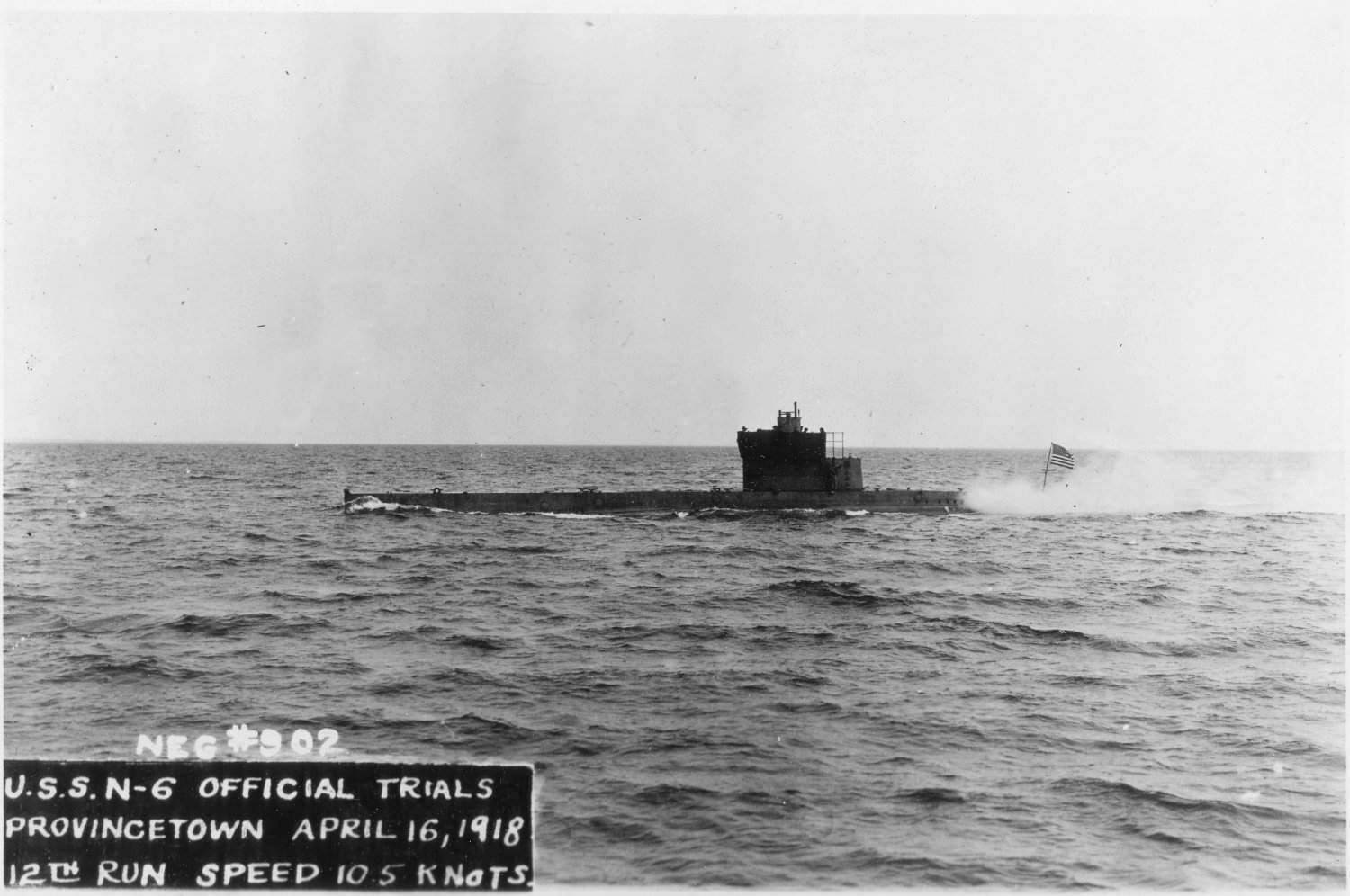
- USS N-6 off Provincetown, Massachusetts, on 16 April 1918, on the 12th run of her sea trials, during which she made 10.5 kn (19.4 km/h; 12.1 mph).

History

United States
- Name: N-6
- Builder: Lake Torpedo Boat Company, Bridgeport, Connecticut
- Cost: $466,841.14 (hull and machinery)
- Laid down: 15 April 1915
- Launched: 21 April 1917
- Sponsored by: Mrs. Irene Kissick
- Commissioned: 9 July 1918
- Decommissioned: 16 February 1922
- Identification: Hull symbol: SS-58 (17 July 1920); Call sign: NZJ
- Fate: Sold for scrap, 31 July 1922

General characteristics
- Class & type: N-class submarine
- Displacement: 331 long tons (336 t) surfaced; 385 long tons (391 t) submerged
- Length: 155 ft 3 in (47.32 m)
- Beam: 14 feet 6 inches (4.42 m)
- Draft: 12 ft 4 in (3.76 m)
- Installed power: 600 bhp (450 kW) diesel; 300 hp (220 kW) electric
- Propulsion: 2 × Busch-Sulzer diesel engines; 2 × Diehl electric motors; 2 × 60-cell batteries; 2 × Propellers
- Speed: 13 kn surfaced; 11 kn submerged
- Test depth: 200 ft
- Complement: 3 officers; 26 enlisted
- Armament: 4 × 18-inch bow torpedo tubes, 8 torpedoes

USS N-6 (SS-58), also known as "Submarine No. 58", was an N-class coastal submarine of the United States Navy commissioned during WWI. She spent the war patrolling off the coast of New England, and was decommissioned after less than four years in service.

== Design ==
The N-class boats designed by Electric Boat, N-1 throughN-3, also referred to as the N-1-class, were built to slightly different specifications from the other N-class submarines, which were designed by Lake Torpedo Boat, referred to as the N-4-class. The Lake submarines had a length of 155 ft (47.2 m) overall, a beam of 14 ft 6 in (4.4 m), and a mean draft of 12 feet 4 inches (3.8 m). They displaced 331 long tons (336 t) on the surface and 385 long tons (391 t) submerged. The Lake submarines had a crew of 3 officers and 26 enlisted men. They had a diving depth of 200 ft (61.0 m).

For surface running, the Lake submarines were powered by two 300-brake-horsepower (224 kW) Busch-Sulzer diesel engines, each driving one propeller shaft. When submerged each propeller was driven by a 150-horsepower (112 kW) Diehl electric motor. They could reach 13 knots (24 km/h; 15 mph) on the surface and 11 kn (20 km/h; 13 mph) underwater.

The boats were armed with four 18-inch (450 mm) torpedo tubes in the bow. They carried four reloads, for a total of eight torpedoes.

== Construction ==
N-6's keel was laid down on 15 April 1915, by the Lake Torpedo Boat Company, in Bridgeport, Connecticut. N-5 was launched on 21 April 1917, sponsored by Mrs. John A. Kissick, and commissioned on 9 July 1918.

== Service history ==
After fitting out at the New London Submarine Base, she commenced patrolling off the New England coast, to protect coastal shipping from German U-boats. She alternated operating out of New London and New York, until she put into the former port, on 13 October 1918, for upkeep.

With the exception of a training cruise up the New England coast, from 14 to 19 July 1919, and a voyage to the New York Navy Yard, from 29 September to 9 October, N-6 remained at New London, until sailing in early May 1920, for Annapolis, Maryland, arriving on 27 May. There, she was used to indoctrinate midshipmen, of the United States Naval Academy, in submarine warfare.

She left Annapolis, on June 3 1920, and arrived back in New London, where, on June 7, she was put in reserve. Remaining in reserve until 15 September, she sailed to Philadelphia, Pennsylvania, for an extensive overhaul, returning to New London on 25 March 1921.

She operated out of New London, making several training cruises, until October, when her engines were transferred to a new L-class submarine.

== Fate ==
Departing New London, on 2 February 1922, under tow of the fleet tug Lykens, she sailed to Philadelphia, where she was decommissioned on 16 February, and was sold for scrap to Joseph G. Hitner, of Philadelphia, on 31 July.

== Bibliography ==
- "Table 21 - Ships on Navy List June 30, 1919". Congressional Serial Set. U.S. Government Printing Office: 768. 1921.
- Priolo, Gary. "N-6 (SS-58)". Navsource.net.
- Friedman, Norman (1995). U.S. Submarines Through 1945: An Illustrated Design History. Annapolis, Maryland: Naval Institute Press. ISBN 1-55750-263-3.
- Gardiner, Robert & Gray, Randal (1985). Conway's All the World's Fighting Ships 1906–1921. Annapolis, Maryland: Naval Institute Press. ISBN 0-85177-245-5.
- Cressman, Robert J. (21 July 2025). "N-6 (Submarine No. 58)". Dictionary of American Naval Fighting Ships. Navy Department, Naval History and Heritage Command. This article incorporates text from this source, which is in the public domain.
