= USS Privateer =

Patrol vessel of the United States Navy

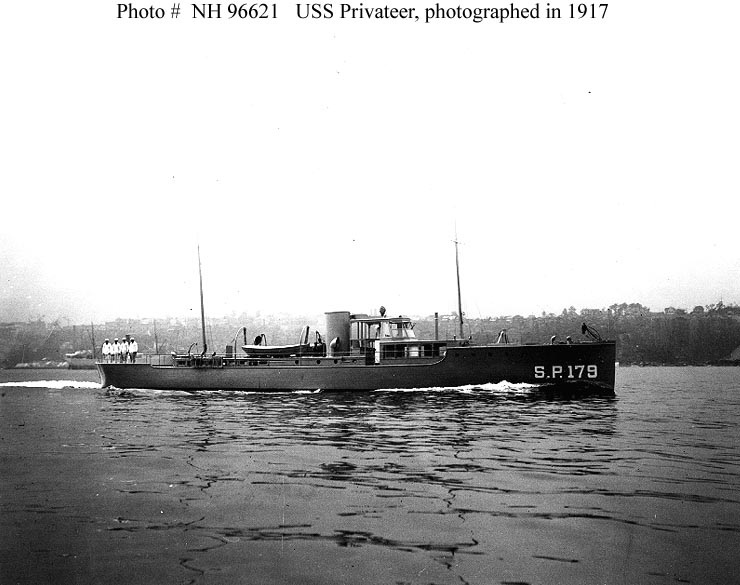
- USS Privateer in 1917.

History

United States
- Name: USS Privateer
- Namesake: A privateer, a private warship authorized by a country's government by letters of marque to attack foreign shipping (previous name retained)
- Builder: Gas Engine and Power Company and Charles L. Seabury and Company, Morris Heights, the Bronx, New York
- Completed: 1917
- Acquired: 25 May 1917
- Commissioned: 15 August 1917
- Decommissioned: 5 February 1930
- Reclassified: From section patrol craft (SP-179) to district patrol craft (YP-179) in 1920
- Stricken: 7 March 1930
- Fate: Transferred to United States Shipping Board 30 June 1930
- Notes: Built as civilian motorboat Privateer

General characteristics
- Type: Patrol vessel
- Length: 108 ft (33 m)
- Beam: 13 ft (4.0 m)
- Draft: 4 ft 6 in (1.37 m)
- Speed: 22 knots
- Armament: 2 × 6-pounder gun; 2 × machine guns

USS Privateer (SP-179), later YP-179, was an armed motorboat that served in the United States Navy as a patrol vessel from 1917 to 1930.

Privateer was built for R. A. C. Smith as a civilian motorboat of the same name in 1917 by the Gas Engine and Power Company and Charles L. Seabury and Company at Morris Heights in the Bronx, New York. The U.S. Navy acquired her under charter from Smith for World War I service as a patrol vessel, and accordingly she was delivered to the Navy on 25 May 1917. She was commissioned as USS Privateer (SP-179) on 15 August 1917.

Privateer was assigned immediately to the 3rd Naval District, headquartered in the New York City area, where she served on section patrol for most of World War I.

On 15 June 1918, Privateer escorted the new submarines USS N–4 (SS-56) and USS N–7 (SS-59) from Bridgeport, Connecticut, to the New York Navy Yard at Brooklyn, New York.

In early 1919, Privateer was attached to Naval Air Station Rockaway at Rockaway in Queens, New York, for postwar duty. On 28 July 1919 she was assigned to Squadron 19, 3rd District Naval Force, where she remained until January 1930, one of only a small number of World War I section patrol craft retained for lengthy postwar service.

In 1920, Privateer was reclassified as a district patrol craft and redesignated YP–179.

Privateer was decommissioned at Norfolk, Virginia, on 5 February 1930. She was stricken from the Naval Vessel Register on 7 March 1930 and transferred to the United States Shipping Board on 30 June 1930.
