= USS S-2 =

S-class submarine of the United States

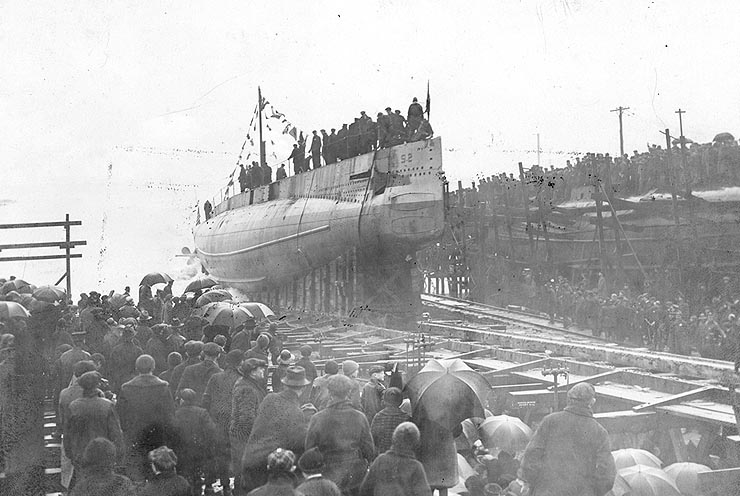
- USS S-2 sliding down the building ways at the Lake Torpedo Boat Company shipyard, Bridgeport, Connecticut, during her launching on 15 February 1919

History

United States
- Name: S-2
- Builder: Lake Torpedo Boat Company, Bridgeport, Connecticut
- Cost: $1,522,663.70 (hull and machinery)
- Laid down: 30 July 1917
- Launched: 15 February 1919
- Sponsored by: Mrs. Chrystie Brill
- Commissioned: 25 May 1920
- Decommissioned: 25 November 1929
- Stricken: 26 February 1931
- Identification: Hull symbol: SS-106 (17 July 1920); Call sign: NIMJ
- Fate: Sold for scrapping, 14 September 1931

General characteristics
- Class & type: S-2-class submarine
- Displacement: 800 long tons (813 t) surfaced; 977 long tons (993 t) submerged
- Length: 207 feet (63 m)
- Beam: 19 ft 7 in (5.97 m)
- Draft: 16 ft 2 in (4.93 m)
- Installed power: 1,800 brake horsepower (1,342 kW) diesel; 1,200 hp (895 kW) electric
- Propulsion: 2 × Busch-Sulzer diesel engines; 2 × Diehl Manufacture Company electric motors; 1 × 120-cell batteries; 2 × Propellers
- Speed: 15 knots (28 km/h; 17 mph) surfaced; 11 kn (20 km/h; 13 mph) submerged
- Test depth: 200 ft (61 m)
- Capacity: 26,458 US gallons (100,150 L; 22,031 imp gal) fuel
- Complement: 4 officers; 34 enlisted
- Armament: 4 × 21-inch (533 mm) torpedo tubes (12 torpedoes); 1 × 4-inch (102 mm)/50-caliber (refit)

USS S-2 (SS-106) was the prototype of the Lake Torpedo Boat Company's "Lake"-type S-class submarine of the United States Navy.

== Design ==
In the summer of 1916, The US Navy's Bureau of Construction and Repair (BuC&R) and Bureau of Steam Engineering, developed specifications for an 800 long tons (810 t) submarine that would be capable of crossing the Atlantic and fight while there. In Fiscal Year 1917 appropriations, they awarded contracts for the first three of these new boats, to be called the S-class. All were to have the same general specifications and tactical capabilities but were to be built by different manufacturers to different design types. The intent was to study the three FY-17 boats in order to eventually consolidate the best features of each into one type. However, all were intended for series production from the start, with the consolidation to come later in follow-on appropriations.

S-2 was a double hull design with ventrally mounted control surfaces by the Lake Torpedo Boat Company, while this is referred to as the S-2-class or "Lake"-type, this design was not repeated. S-1 was built to an axially oriented single hull design by the Electric Boat Company, the boats that would follow this design were referred to as the S-1-class, or "Holland"-type, boats. S-3 another double hull design, by BuC&R, and built at the government owned Portsmouth Navy Yard, the boats built to this design were referred to as the S-3-class, "Navy Yard"-type, or even "Government"-type.

== Construction ==
S-2's keel was laid down on 30 July 1917, by the Lake Torpedo Boat Company, in Bridgeport, Connecticut. She was launched on 15 February 1919, sponsored by Mrs. Crystie Brill, and commissioned on 25 May 1920.

== Service history ==
When the US Navy adopted its hull classification system on 17 July 1920, she received the hull number SS-106.

After trials and outfitting, S-2 rendezvoused off Portsmouth, New Hampshire, on 22 July 1921, with members of Submarine Divisions 18 and 12 (SubDivs 18 and 12), for what was, at that time, the longest cruise on record for American submarines. They sailed via the Panama Canal, to Pearl Harbor, and then on to Cavite, Luzon, in the Philippines. Submarines which had previously served in the Asiatic Fleet, the Plunger-class, had been carried over tied to the decks of colliers.

The two divisions operated from the Cavite Naval Station, during the three years following their arrival on 1 December 1921. They frequently visited Chinese ports, at Shanghai, Yantai, Qinhuangdao, Qingdao, Amoy, and Wusong, during this period. On 29 October 1924, Far East duty was terminated for the divisions, and they departed for the West Coast. S-2, however, remained behind. On 5 November, her status was reduced to, in commission, in reserve. Retaining a partial crew for maintenance and readiness, she remained in reserve until 5 May 1928, when she again was commissioned in full.

S-2 spent the rest of May, June, and July, in China, then resumed operations in the Philippines, which she continued until ordered to return to the Philadelphia Navy Yard, for inactivation.

== Fate ==
She departed Manila, on 27 April 1929, and sailed via Guam, Pearl Harbor, California, and the Panama Canal, to Philadelphia. Arriving on 5 August, S-2 was decommissioned there on 25 November 1929. After being stripped, she was struck from the Naval Vessel Register in 1931, and sold on 14 September, of that year.

== Bibliography ==
- "Table 21 - Ships on Navy List June 30, 1919". Congressional Serial Set. U.S. Government Printing Office: 770. 1921.
- Friedman, Norman (1995). U.S. Submarines Through 1945: An Illustrated Design History. Annapolis, Maryland: Naval Institute Press. ISBN 1-55750-263-3.
- Priolo, Gary. "S-2 (SS-106)". Navsource.net.
- Hall, Anne Martin (1925). Ships of the United States navy and their sponsors, 1913-1923.
- "S-2". Dictionary of American Naval Fighting Ships. Navy Department, Naval History and Heritage Command. 1 September 2015. This article incorporates text from this source, which is in the public domain.
- Johnston, David L. (October 2025). "A Visual Guide to the S-class Submarines, Part 1" (PDF) (5th ed.).
