= USS Lykens =

Tugboat of the United States Navy

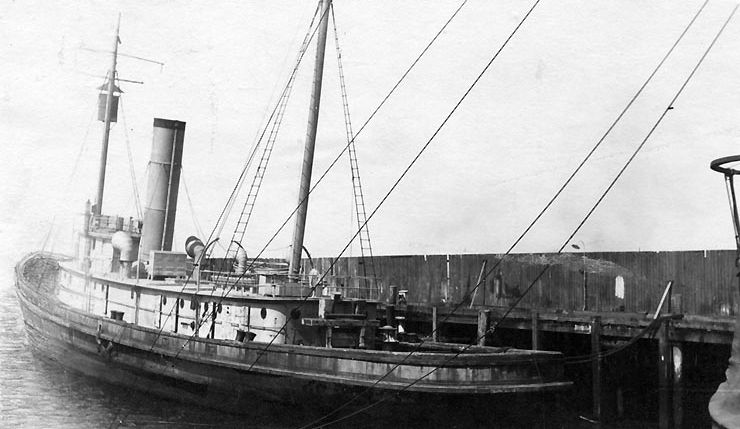
- Lykens in port, c. 1917

History

United States
- Name: USS Lykens (SP-876)
- Builder: Neafie and Levy Ship and Engine Building Company, Philadelphia
- Launched: 1899
- Acquired: 18 September 1917
- Commissioned: 10 November 1917
- Decommissioned: 9 December 1922
- Fate: Sold, 3 February 1934; ultimate fate unknown

General characteristics
- Tonnage: 425 t.
- Length: 170 ft (52 m)
- Beam: 29 ft (8.8 m)
- Draft: 15 ft (4.6 m)
- Propulsion: steam
- Armament: 1 × 3"/50 caliber gun mount; 2 × .30 caliber machine guns

USS Lykens (SP-876/AT-56) was a steam tugboat purchased from the Reading Company by the United States Navy in 1917. Because she was privately built, she was not of a ship class. She was the only U.S. Navy ship of this name.

The ship served on the East Coast, in Bermuda, and in the Azores during World War I. After the war, she operated from New York and Norfolk, Virginia until decommissioning in 1922. She was considered one of the most powerful tugs in the Navy during her career. Lykens was sold in 1934.

== History ==
Lykens was built in 1899 by Neafie and Levy Ship and Engine Building Company of Philadelphia for the Reading Company.

On 17 September 1903, Lykens rescued the captain of tug Spartan which had sunk the previous night in a gale off Lewes, Delaware.

A storm on 10 January 1911 caused coal barges Treverton, Corbin, and Pine Forest, under tow by Lykens, to break free of the tow near the Cape Cod Light. The 12 men crewing Treverton and Corbin were drowned when their barges broke up within an hour. The five men aboard Pine Forest were all drowned when their lifeboat was swamped in the rough surf. Lykens and local lifesavers watching from the shore were helpless to provide any assistance because of the severity of the storm. Despite the accident, Lykens remained a frequent visitor to ports in New England.

On 4 February 1917, Lykens was inspected by the 4th Naval District of the U.S. Navy. After the U.S. had entered World War I, Lykens was purchased by the Navy on 18 September 1917. She was commissioned USS Lykens (SP-876) on 10 November 1917 at Philadelphia.

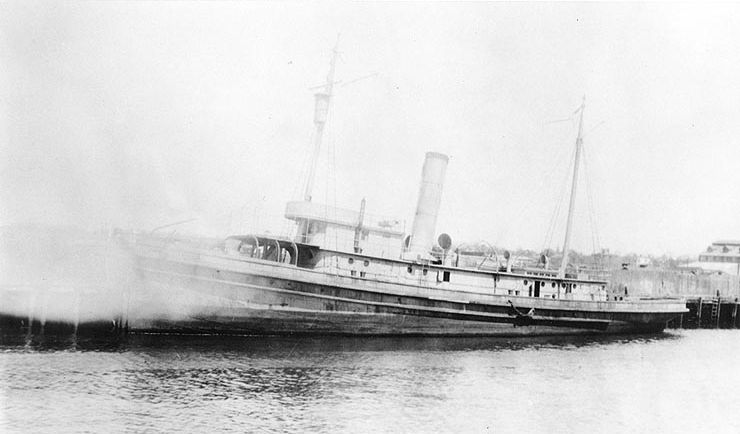
Lykens around the time she was taken over by the U.S. Navy, c. 1917

Lykens performed towing duties along the east coast, to Bermuda, and the Azores throughout World War I. On 24 February 1918, Lykens, along with Wadena, Mariner and Yacona set sail from Newport, Rhode Island, rendezvousing with eleven 110-foot (34 m) submarine chasers en route. Though Mariner foundered and sank along the journey, all the other ships arrived at Bermuda on 1 March. On 15 April, Lykens set sail from Bermuda in the company of Wadena, seven submarine chasers, and United States Army tug Knickerbocker, arriving at Ponta Delgada in the Azores on 27 April.

After the war she was assigned to district towing and auxiliary operations, out of the 3d (New York) and 5th (Norfolk) Naval Districts. Lykens continued these duties until she decommissioned at New York 23 March 1920.

She recommissioned as AT‑56 17 June 1920 and served as a fleet tug in the 3d Naval District out of New York.

On 30 April 1921 Lykens and Coast Guard Cutter Acushnet were dispatched to assist submarine O-10 that had grounded off Montauk Point in Block Island Sound. Lykens and Acushnet were delayed by heavy fog and did not reach the stranded sub before the tide lifted it from its perch.

In late 1921 the engines from the Navy’s four Lake Torpedo Boat-built N-class submarines were removed to be installed in more modern L-class submarines. In early 1922, Lykens was ordered to tow three of the engineless subs from New London, Connecticut, to Philadelphia for decommissioning and scrapping. She towed N-7 in late January, N-6 in February, and N-5 in April.

Lykens was decommissioned on 9 December 1922 and kept in reserve until 3 February 1934, when she was sold to Northern Metal Co. of Philadelphia. Her ultimate fate is unknown.
