= USS N-5 =

N-class submarine of the United States

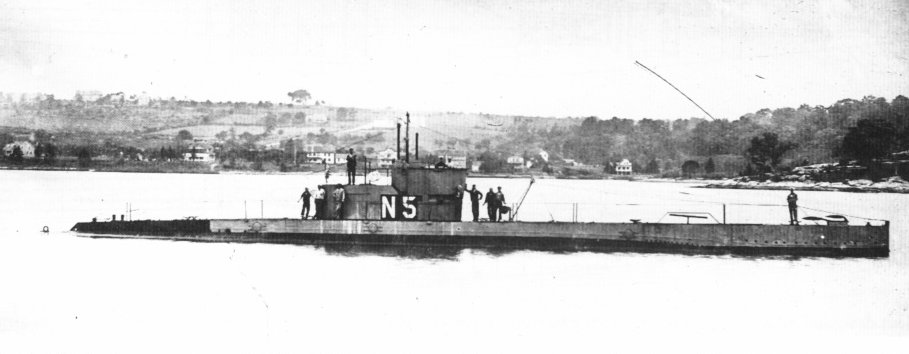
- USS N-5 at the end of World War I

History

United States
- Name: N-5
- Builder: Lake Torpedo Boat Company, Bridgeport, Connecticut
- Cost: $463,030.81 (hull and machinery)
- Laid down: 10 April 1915
- Launched: 22 March 1917
- Sponsored by: Mrs. Ida Bevans
- Commissioned: 13 June 1918
- Decommissioned: 19 April 1922
- Identification: Hull symbol: SS-57 (17 July 1920); Call sign: NZI
- Fate: Sold for scrap, 25 September 1922

General characteristics
- Class & type: N-class submarine
- Displacement: 331 long tons (336 t) surfaced; 385 long tons (391 t) submerged
- Length: 155 ft 3 in (47.32 m)
- Beam: 14 feet 6 inches (4.42 m)
- Draft: 12 ft 4 in (3.76 m)
- Installed power: 600 bhp (450 kW) diesel; 300 hp (220 kW) electric
- Propulsion: 2 × Busch-Sulzer diesel engines; 2 × Diehl electric motors; 2 × 60-cell batteries; 2 × Propellers
- Speed: 13 kn surfaced; 11 kn submerged
- Test depth: 200 ft
- Complement: 3 officers; 26 enlisted
- Armament: 4 × 18-inch bow torpedo tubes, 8 torpedoes

USS N-5 (SS-57), also known as "Submarine No. 57", was an N-class coastal submarine of the United States Navy commissioned during WWI. She spent the war patrolling off the coast of New England, and was decommissioned after less than four years in service.

== Design ==
The N-class boats designed by Electric Boat, N-1 throughN-3, also referred to as the N-1-class, were built to slightly different specifications from the other N-class submarines, which were designed by Lake Torpedo Boat, referred to as the N-4-class. The Lake submarines had a length of 155 ft (47.2 m) overall, a beam of 14 ft 6 in (4.4 m), and a mean draft of 12 feet 4 inches (3.8 m). They displaced 331 long tons (336 t) on the surface and 385 long tons (391 t) submerged. The Lake submarines had a crew of 3 officers and 26 enlisted men. They had a diving depth of 200 ft (61.0 m).

For surface running, the Lake submarines were powered by two 300-brake-horsepower (224 kW) Busch-Sulzer diesel engines, each driving one propeller shaft. When submerged each propeller was driven by a 150-horsepower (112 kW) Diehl electric motor. They could reach 13 knots (24 km/h; 15 mph) on the surface and 11 kn (20 km/h; 13 mph) underwater.

The boats were armed with four 18-inch (450 mm) torpedo tubes in the bow. They carried four reloads, for a total of eight torpedoes.

== Construction ==
N-5's keel was laid down on 10 April 1915, by the Lake Torpedo Boat Company, in Bridgeport, Connecticut. N-5 was launched on 22 March 1917, sponsored by Mrs. Ida Bevans, and commissioned at the New York Navy Yard, on 13 June 1918.

== Service history ==
Sailing from New York, on 20 June 1918, to New London Submarine Base, for fitting out and thence proceeding to Newport, Rhode Island, to load torpedoes. N-5 began patrols off New England and in Long Island Sound, on watch against attacks on coastal shipping by German U-boats.

In August and September, she deployed under tow by a decoy ship, the schooner Charles Whittemore. On 7 September 1918, after parting tow from her escort in a heavy sea, she was mistaken by an armed transport for a U-boat and was fired upon. All 15 shells fell short and N-5 was able to proceed on to New London. She continued her patrols until 24 October, when she put into the New York Navy Yard, for repairs, and remained there following the Armistice with Germany until sailing to Philadelphia, Pennsylvania, on 21 February 1919.

Overhauled, the submarine departed Philadelphia, on 27 March 1919, arriving at New London, on 10 April. Remaining in ordinary at the Submarine Base, until 10 March 1920, the submarine then operated off the East Coast, in training, until placed in reserve at New London, on 7 June 1920.

On 1 October, N-5 sailed to the Philadelphia Navy Yard for extensive overhaul, lasting until 7 April 1921, when she returned to New London, once again being placed in ordinary.

== Fate ==
There she remained for the next year, while her main engines were removed for transfer to a newer L-class submarine. Then, towed by the fleet tug Lykens, she moved to the Philadelphia Navy Yard, arriving on 14 April 1922. N-5 decommissioned on 19 April 1922, and was sold to Joseph G. Hitner of Philadelphia for scrap on 25 September 1922.

== Bibliography ==
- "Table 21 - Ships on Navy List June 30, 1919". Congressional Serial Set. U.S. Government Printing Office: 768. 1921.
- Priolo, Gary. "N-5 (SS-57)". Navsource.net.
- Friedman, Norman (1995). U.S. Submarines Through 1945: An Illustrated Design History. Annapolis, Maryland: Naval Institute Press. ISBN 1-55750-263-3.
- Gardiner, Robert & Gray, Randal (1985). Conway's All the World's Fighting Ships 1906–1921. Annapolis, Maryland: Naval Institute Press. ISBN 0-85177-245-5.
- Cressman, Robert J. (18 July 2025). "N-5 (Submarine No. 57)". Dictionary of American Naval Fighting Ships. Navy Department, Naval History and Heritage Command. This article incorporates text from this source, which is in the public domain.
- "Charles Whittemore". Dictionary of American Naval Fighting Ships. Navy Department, Naval History and Heritage Command. This article incorporates text from this source, which is in the public domain.
