= USS S-15 =

S-class submarine of the United States

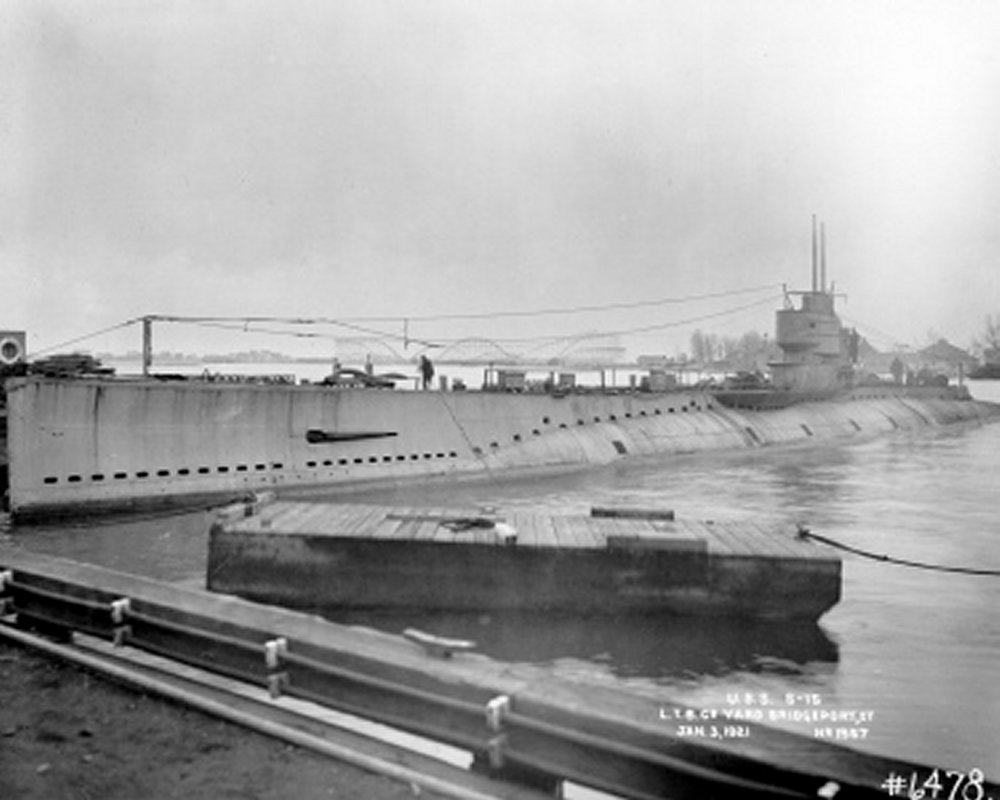
- USS S-15 (SS-120), dockside at Bridgeport, Connecticut, 3 January, 12 days before her commissioning, on 15 January 1921

History

United States
- Name: S-15
- Builder: Lake Torpedo Boat Company, Bridgeport, Connecticut
- Cost: $1,020,854.53 (hull and machinery)
- Laid down: 13 December 1917
- Launched: 8 March 1920
- Sponsored by: Mrs. Margaret Lake
- Commissioned: 15 January 1921
- Decommissioned: 26 April 1935
- Recommissioned: 3 January 1941
- Decommissioned: 11 June 1946
- Stricken: 3 July 1946
- Identification: Hull symbol: SS-120; Call sign: NINB
- Fate: Sold for scrapping, 4 December 1946

General characteristics
- Class & type: S-3-class submarine
- Displacement: 875 long tons (889 t) surfaced; 1,088 long tons (1,105 t) submerged
- Length: 231 feet (70 m)
- Beam: 21 ft 10 in (6.65 m)
- Draft: 13 ft 1 in (3.99 m)
- Installed power: 1,400 brake horsepower (1,044 kW) diesel; 1,200 hp (895 kW) electric
- Propulsion: 2 × Busch-Sulzer 6M150 diesel engines; 2 × Westinghouse Electric Corporation electric motors; 2 × 60-cell batteries; 2 × Propellers
- Speed: 15 knots (28 km/h; 17 mph) surfaced; 11 kn (20 km/h; 13 mph) submerged
- Test depth: 200 ft (61 m)
- Capacity: 36,950 US gallons (139,900 L; 30,770 imp gal) fuel
- Complement: 4 officers; 34 enlisted
- Armament: 4 × Bow 21-inch (533 mm) torpedo tubes (12 torpedoes); 1 × Stern 21-in torpedo tube (2 torpedoes); 1 × 4-inch (102 mm)/50-caliber

USS S-15 (SS-120) was an S-3-class, also referred to as a "Government"-type, submarine of the United States Navy.

== Design ==
The "Government"-type had a length of 231 feet (70.4 m) overall, a beam of 21 ft 10 in (6.7 m), and a mean draft of 13 ft 1 in (4.0 m). They displaced 875 long tons (889 t) on the surface and 1,088 long tons (1,105 t) submerged. All S-class submarines had a crew of 4 officers and 34 enlisted men, when first commissioned. They had a diving depth of 200 ft (61.0 m).

For surface running, the "Government"-type built by Lake Torpedo Boat Company, were powered by two 700-brake-horsepower (522 kW) Busch-Sulzer 6M150 diesel engines, each driving one propeller shaft. When submerged each propeller was driven by a 600-horsepower (447 kW) Westinghouse Electric Corporation electric motor. They could reach 15 knots (28 km/h; 17 mph) on the surface and 11 kn (20 km/h; 13 mph) underwater.

The boats were armed with four 21-inch (533 mm) torpedo tubes in the bow. They carried 8 reloads, for a total of twelve torpedoes. The "Government"-type submarines were also armed with a single 4 in (100 mm)/50 caliber deck gun.

== Construction ==
S-15's keel was laid down on 13 December 1917, by the Lake Torpedo Boat Company, in Bridgeport, Connecticut. She was launched on 8 March 1920, sponsored by Mrs. Margaret Lake, wife of Simon Lake, and commissioned on 15 January 1921.

== Service history ==
=== 1921–1935 ===
Attached to SubDiv 18, S-15 departed New London, Connecticut, on 31 May 1921, and sailed via the Panama Canal, California, the Territory of Hawaii, and Guam, to the Philippines. She arrived at Cavite, Luzon, on 1 December 1921.

In 1922, she sailed from Cavite, on 11 October, visited Hong Kong, from 14 October to 28 October, and returned to Cavite, on 1 November. Sailing from Manila, on 15 May 1923, S-15 visited Shanghai, Yantai, and Qinhuangdao, before returning via Wusong and Amoy, to Cavite, on 11 September. In the summer of 1924, she again visited China, and returned to Olongapo, on 23 September.

Departing Cavite on 29 October 1924, she arrived at the Mare Island Naval Shipyard, California, on 30 December. Remaining at Mare Island, in 1925 and 1926, she operated along the West Coast, through 1927.

From February 1928, into 1935, S-15 served in the Panama Canal area, although she visited Baltimore, Maryland, from 15 May to 5 June 1933.

She departed Coco Solo on 11 January 1935, for the Philadelphia Naval Shipyard, where she decommissioned on 26 April 1935.

=== 1940–1946 ===
S-15 was recommissioned on 3 January 1941, at Philadelphia. Following voyages to Bermuda, she operated at Saint Thomas, US Virgin Islands, from 31 October to 9 December 1941; in the Panama Canal area, from January 1942 into December 1943; at Guantanamo Bay, through May 1944; in the Panama Canal area, from June through September 1944; at Trinidad, for the rest of the year; and at Guantanamo, from January into March 1945.

== Fate ==
S-15 departed Guantanamo, on 23 March 1945, and reported at New London, for inactivation. She was decommissioned on 11 June 1946, at Philadelphia, and was struck from the Naval Vessel Register. On 4 December 1946, she was sold for scrapping to the Potomac Shipwrecking Company, of Maryland.

== Awards ==
- American Defense Service Medal
- American Campaign Medal
- World War II Victory Medal

== Bibliography ==
- "Table 21 - Ships on Navy List June 30, 1919". Congressional Serial Set. U.S. Government Printing Office: 770. 1921.
- Friedman, Norman (1995). U.S. Submarines Through 1945: An Illustrated Design History. Annapolis, Maryland: Naval Institute Press. ISBN 1-55750-263-3.
- Priolo, Gary. "S-15 (SS-120)". Navsource.net.
- Hall, Anne Martin (1925). Ships of the United States navy and their sponsors, 1913-1923.
- "S-15". Dictionary of American Naval Fighting Ships. Navy Department, Naval History and Heritage Command. 1 September 2015. This article incorporates text from this source, which is in the public domain.
- Hedman, Ric; Johnston, David (22 October 2025). "S-14 through S-17". PigBoats.com.
