= USS N-7 =

N-class submarine of the United States

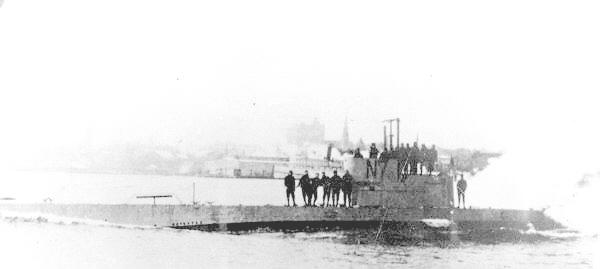
- USS N-7 underway in harbor, c. 1918-22

History

United States
- Name: N-7
- Builder: Lake Torpedo Boat Company, Bridgeport, Connecticut
- Cost: $463,896.47 (hull and machinery)
- Laid down: 20 April 1915
- Launched: 19 May 1917
- Sponsored by: Mrs. Anne Miller
- Commissioned: 15 June 1918
- Decommissioned: 7 February 1922
- Identification: Hull symbol: SS-59 (17 July 1920); Call sign: NZK
- Fate: Sold for scrap, 5 June 1922

General characteristics
- Class & type: N-class submarine
- Displacement: 331 long tons (336 t) surfaced; 385 long tons (391 t) submerged
- Length: 155 ft 3 in (47.32 m)
- Beam: 14 feet 6 inches (4.42 m)
- Draft: 12 ft 4 in (3.76 m)
- Installed power: 600 bhp (450 kW) diesel; 300 hp (220 kW) electric
- Propulsion: 2 × Busch-Sulzer diesel engines; 2 × Diehl electric motors; 2 × 60-cell batteries; 2 × Propellers
- Speed: 13 kn surfaced; 11 kn submerged
- Test depth: 200 ft
- Complement: 3 officers; 26 enlisted
- Armament: 4 × 18-inch bow torpedo tubes, 8 torpedoes

USS N-7 (SS-59), also known as "Submarine No. 59", was an N-class coastal submarine of the United States Navy commissioned during WWI. She spent the war patrolling off the coast of New England, and was decommissioned after less than four years in service.

== Design ==
The N-class boats designed by Electric Boat, N-1 throughN-3, also referred to as the N-1-class, were built to slightly different specifications from the other N-class submarines, which were designed by Lake Torpedo Boat, referred to as the N-4-class. The Lake submarines had a length of 155 ft (47.2 m) overall, a beam of 14 ft 6 in (4.4 m), and a mean draft of 12 feet 4 inches (3.8 m). They displaced 331 long tons (336 t) on the surface and 385 long tons (391 t) submerged. The Lake submarines had a crew of 3 officers and 26 enlisted men. They had a diving depth of 200 ft (61.0 m).

For surface running, the Lake submarines were powered by two 300-brake-horsepower (224 kW) Busch-Sulzer diesel engines, each driving one propeller shaft. When submerged each propeller was driven by a 150-horsepower (112 kW) Diehl electric motor. They could reach 13 knots (24 km/h; 15 mph) on the surface and 11 kn (20 km/h; 13 mph) underwater.

The boats were armed with four 18-inch (450 mm) torpedo tubes in the bow. They carried four reloads, for a total of eight torpedoes.

== Construction ==
N-7's keel was laid down on 20 April 1915, by the Lake Torpedo Boat Company, in Bridgeport, Connecticut. She was launched on 19 May 1917, sponsored by Mrs. Anne Miller, and commissioned on 15 June 1918.

== Service history ==
After fitting out at New London Submarine Base, in Groton, Connecticut, she patrolled the New England coast, to guard against attacks by German U-boats, until 17 September, when she put into New York, for upkeep.

Returning to New London, on 24 October, she remained there until 21 June 1919, when she sailed to the Philadelphia Navy Yard, in Philadelphia, Pennsylvania, for extensive overhaul. She returned to New London, on 31 March 1920, and remained there until placed in reserve on 7 June.

N-7 spent 1921, in reserve, at New London, except for short cruises to Boston, Massachusetts, and Newport, Rhode Island. Later that year, her engines were transferred to a more modern L-class submarine.

== Fate ==
On 26 January 1922, towed by the fleet tug Lykens, she departed for Philadelphia, where she decommissioned on 7 February. Her hulk was sold to Joseph G. Hitner, of Philadelphia, for scrap on 5 June 1922.

== Bibliography ==
- "Table 21 - Ships on Navy List June 30, 1919". Congressional Serial Set. U.S. Government Printing Office: 768. 1921.
- Priolo, Gary. "N-7 (SS-59)". Navsource.net.
- Friedman, Norman (1995). U.S. Submarines Through 1945: An Illustrated Design History. Annapolis, Maryland: Naval Institute Press. ISBN 1-55750-263-3.
- Gardiner, Robert & Gray, Randal (1985). Conway's All the World's Fighting Ships 1906–1921. Annapolis, Maryland: Naval Institute Press. ISBN 0-85177-245-5.
- Cressman, Robert J. (21 July 2025). "N-7 (Submarine No. 59)". Dictionary of American Naval Fighting Ships. Navy Department, Naval History and Heritage Command. This article incorporates text from this source, which is in the public domain.
