= USS N-2 =

N-class submarine of the United States

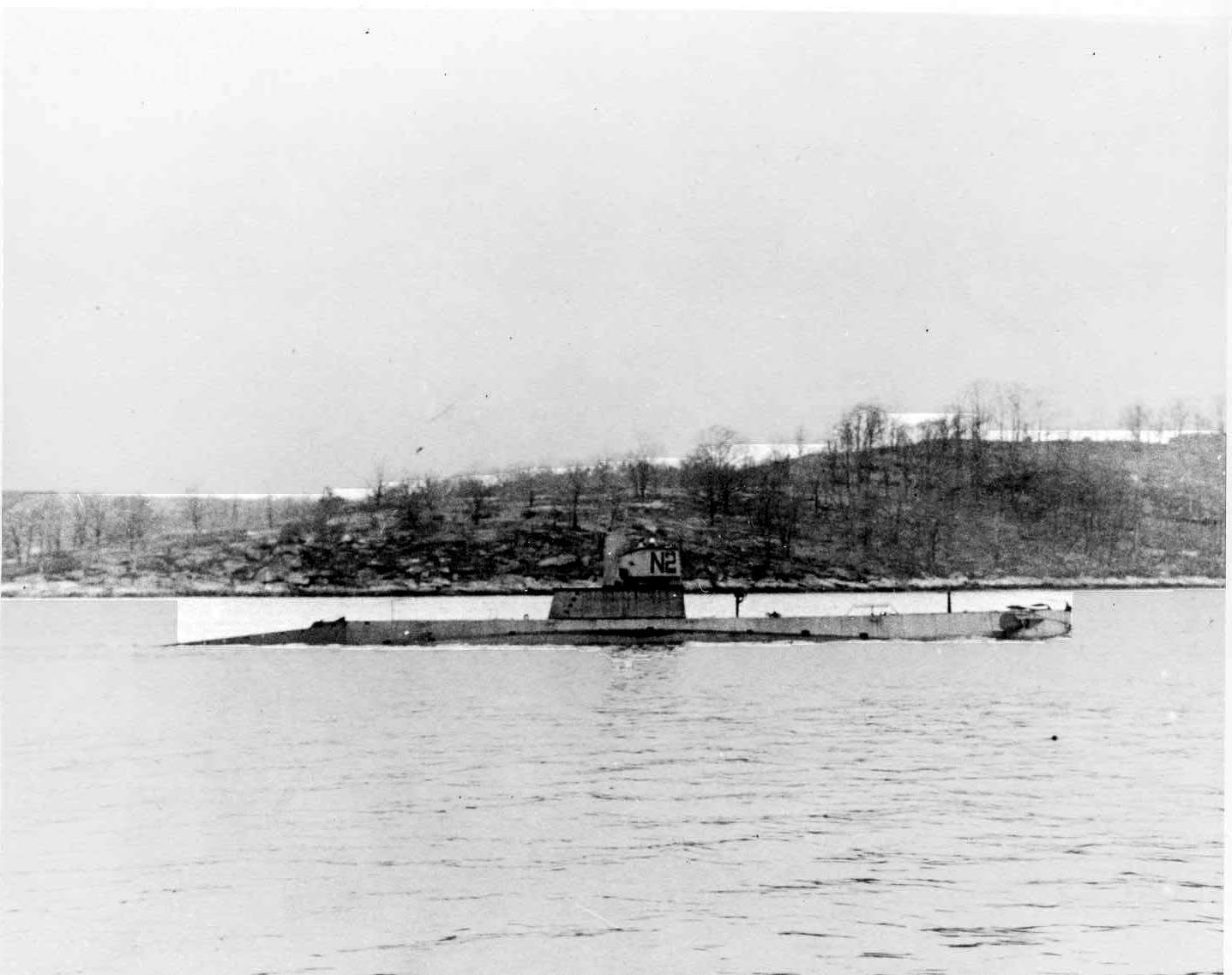
- USS N-2 in Puget Sound, Washington, while fitting out in 1917. She is proceeding to sea for sea trials.

History

United States
- Name: N-2
- Builder: Seattle Construction and Drydock Company, Seattle, Washington
- Cost: $469,207.33 (hull and machinery)
- Laid down: 29 July 1915
- Launched: 16 January 1917
- Sponsored by: Mrs. Evelyn Drake
- Commissioned: 26 September 1917
- Decommissioned: 30 April 1926
- Stricken: 18 December 1930
- Identification: Hull symbol: SS-54 (17 July 1920); Call sign: NZF
- Fate: Scrapped, 1931

General characteristics
- Class & type: N-class submarine
- Displacement: 347 long tons (353 t) surfaced; 414 long tons (421 t) submerged
- Length: 147 ft 3 in (44.88 m)
- Beam: 15 ft 9 in (4.80 m)
- Draft: 12 ft 6 in (3.81 m)
- Installed power: 480 bhp (360 kW) diesel; 560 hp (420 kW) electric
- Propulsion: 2 × NELSECO 240V8FS Diesel engines; 2 × Electro Dynamic electric motors; 2 × 60-cell batteries, 2 × Propellers
- Speed: 13 kn (24 km/h; 15 mph) surfaced; 11 kn (20 km/h; 13 mph) submerged
- Range: 3,500 nmi (6,500 km; 4,000 mi) at 11 kn surfaced
- Test depth: 200 ft (61 m)
- Capacity: 6,058 US gal (22,930 L; 5,044 imp gal) fuel
- Complement: 2 officers; 23 enlisted
- Armament: 4 × 18 inch (450 mm) bow torpedo tubes (8 torpedoes)

USS N-2 (SS-54), also known as "Submarine No. 54", was an N-class coastal submarine of the United States Navy commissioned during World War I. She spent the war patrolling off the coast of New England, and was decommissioned after less than ten years in service.

== Design ==
The N-class boats designed by Electric Boat, N-1 throughN-3, also referred to as the N-1-class, were built to slightly different specifications from the other N-class submarines, which were designed by Lake Torpedo Boat, referred to as the N-4-class. The Electric Boat submarines had a length of 147 ft 3 in (44.9 m) overall, a beam of 15 ft 9 in (4.8 m), and a mean draft of 12 feet 6 inches (3.8 m). They displaced 347 long tons (353 t) on the surface and 414 long tons (421 t) submerged. The Electric Boat submarines had a crew of 2 officers and 23 enlisted men. They had a diving depth of 200 ft (61.0 m).

For surface running, the Electric Boat submarines were powered by two 240-brake-horsepower (179 kW) NELSECO 240V8FS diesel engines, each driving one propeller shaft. When submerged each propeller was driven by a 280-horsepower (209 kW) Electro Dynamic electric motor. They could reach 13 knots (24 km/h; 15 mph) on the surface and 11 kn (20 km/h; 13 mph) underwater. On the surface, the boats had a range of 3,500 nautical miles (6,500 km; 4,000 mi) at 11 kn and 30 nautical miles (56 km; 35 mi) at 5 kn (9.3 km/h; 5.8 mph) submerged.

The boats were armed with four 18-inch (450 mm) torpedo tubes in the bow. They carried four reloads, for a total of eight torpedoes.

== Construction ==
N-2's keel was laid down on 29 July 1915, by the Seattle Construction and Drydock Company, in Seattle, Washington. She was launched on 16 January 1917, sponsored by Mrs. Whitford Drake, and commissioned on 26 September 1917.

== Service history ==
After fitting out and conducting sea trials in Puget Sound, N-2 departed the Puget Sound Navy Yard, 21 November 1917, and sailed for San Francisco, California, in company with her sister boats N-1 and N-3. Upon arriving at San Francisco, she was ordered to proceed to the East Coast, via the Panama Canal, for assignment to the Submarine Force, US Atlantic Fleet.

She arrived at New London, Connecticut, on 7 February 1918, and almost immediately began to patrol along the New England coast, guarding against enemy submarines. Operating in this area for the remainder of the war, N-2 helped keep the sea lanes open.

Following the end of World War I, N-2 continued her operations out of New London, serving as a training ship for the Submarine School. Beginning in late May 1921, the submarine also tested experimental Navy weapons, such as a radio-controlled torpedo, and evaluated its potential value in modern combat. Placed in reduced commission 22 April 1922, N-2 continued her training and experimental duties at New London. On 11 October, she aided the tanker Swiftstar, grounded on the southern end of Block Island.

== Fate ==
She remained in active service until decommissioned 30 April 1926, at Philadelphia Navy Yard. Struck from the Naval Vessel Register on 18 December 1930, N-2 was scrapped in early 1931.

== Bibliography ==
- "Table 21 - Ships on Navy List June 30, 1919". Congressional Serial Set. U.S. Government Printing Office: 768. 1921.
- Priolo, Gary. "N-2 (SS-54)". Navsource.net.
- Friedman, Norman (1995). U.S. Submarines Through 1945: An Illustrated Design History. Annapolis, Maryland: Naval Institute Press. ISBN 1-55750-263-3.
- Gardiner, Robert & Gray, Randal (1985). Conway's All the World's Fighting Ships 1906–1921. Annapolis, Maryland: Naval Institute Press. ISBN 0-85177-245-5.
- Cressman, Robert J. (21 July 2025). "N-2 (Submarine No. 54)". Dictionary of American Naval Fighting Ships. Navy Department, Naval History and Heritage Command. This article incorporates text from this source, which is in the public domain.
