= USS N-3 =

N-class submarine of the United States

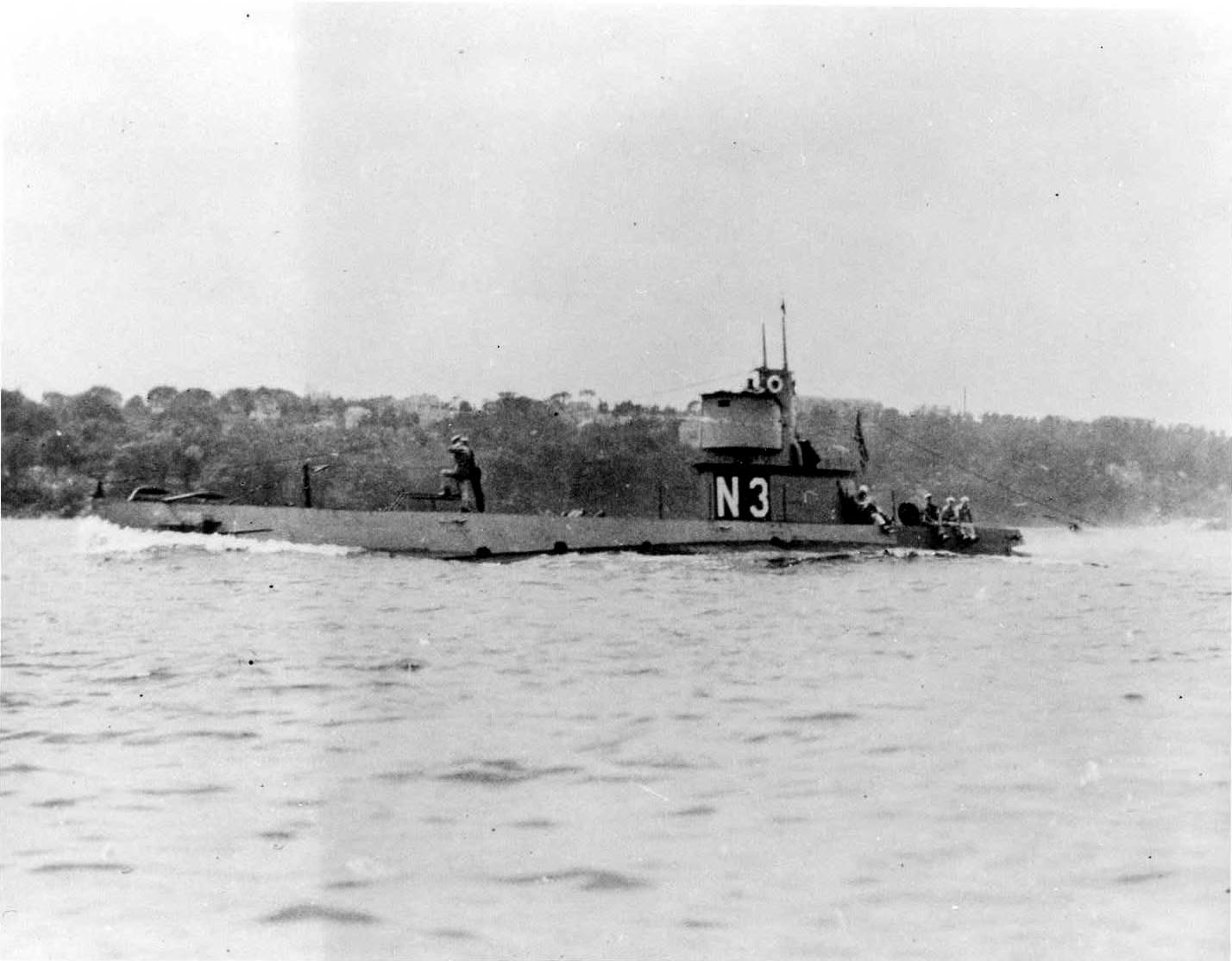
- USS N-3, possibly during her voyage up the St. Lawrence River, in 1921

History

United States
- Name: N-3
- Builder: Seattle Construction and Drydock Company, Seattle, Washington
- Cost: $470,560.10 (hull and machinery)
- Laid down: 31 July 1915
- Launched: 21 February 1917
- Sponsored by: Miss Bertha Coontz
- Commissioned: 26 September 1917
- Decommissioned: 30 April 1926
- Stricken: 18 December 1930
- Identification: Hull symbol: SS-55 (17 July 1920); Call sign: NZG
- Fate: Scrapped, 1931

General characteristics
- Class & type: N-class submarine
- Displacement: 347 long tons (353 t) surfaced; 414 long tons (421 t) submerged
- Length: 147 ft 3 in (44.88 m)
- Beam: 15 ft 9 in (4.80 m)
- Draft: 12 ft 6 in (3.81 m)
- Installed power: 480 bhp (360 kW) diesel; 560 hp (420 kW) electric
- Propulsion: 2 × NELSECO 240V8FS Diesel engines; 2 × Electro Dynamic electric motors; 2 × 60-cell batteries, 2 × Propellers
- Speed: 13 kn (24 km/h; 15 mph) surfaced; 11 kn (20 km/h; 13 mph) submerged
- Range: 3,500 nmi (6,500 km; 4,000 mi) at 11 kn surfaced
- Test depth: 200 ft (61 m)
- Capacity: 6,058 US gal (22,930 L; 5,044 imp gal) fuel
- Complement: 2 officers; 23 enlisted
- Armament: 4 × 18 inch (450 mm) bow torpedo tubes (8 torpedoes)

USS N-3 (SS-55), also known as "Submarine No. 55", was an N-class coastal submarine of the United States Navy commissioned during World War I. She spent the war patrolling off the coast of New England, and was decommissioned after less than ten years in service.

== Design ==
The N-class boats designed by Electric Boat, N-1 throughN-3, also referred to as the N-1-class, were built to slightly different specifications from the other N-class submarines, which were designed by Lake Torpedo Boat, referred to as the N-4-class. The Electric Boat submarines had a length of 147 ft 3 in (44.9 m) overall, a beam of 15 ft 9 in (4.8 m), and a mean draft of 12 feet 6 inches (3.8 m). They displaced 347 long tons (353 t) on the surface and 414 long tons (421 t) submerged. The Electric boat submarines had a crew of 2 officers and 23 enlisted men. They had a diving depth of 200 ft (61.0 m).

For surface running, the Electric Boat submarines were powered by two 240-brake-horsepower (179 kW) NELSECO 240V8FS diesel engines, each driving one propeller shaft. When submerged each propeller was driven by a 280-horsepower (209 kW) Electro Dynamic electric motor. They could reach 13 knots (24 km/h; 15 mph) on the surface and 11 kn (20 km/h; 13 mph) underwater. On the surface, the boats had a range of 3,500 nautical miles (6,500 km; 4,000 mi) at 11 kn and 30 nautical miles (56 km; 35 mi) at 5 kn (9.3 km/h; 5.8 mph) submerged.

The boats were armed with four 18-inch (450 mm) torpedo tubes in the bow. They carried four reloads, for a total of eight torpedoes.

== Construction ==
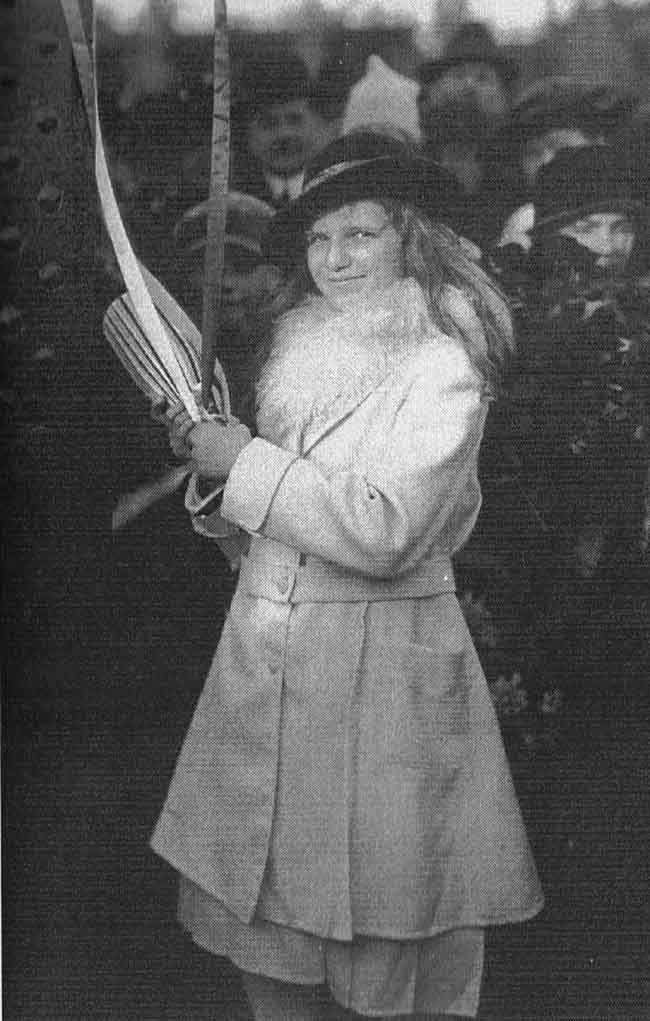
Bertha Coontz sponsoring N-3 the launching ceremony on 17 February 1917.

N-3's keel was laid down on 31 July 1915, by the Seattle Construction and Drydock Company, in Seattle, Washington. She was launched on 21 February 1917, sponsored by Miss Bertha Coontz, daughter of the Commandant of Puget Sound Navy Yard, Captain Robert Coontz, and commissioned on 26 September 1917.

== Service history ==
Following sea trials in Puget Sound, N-3 and her sister boats N-1 and N-2, departed the Puget Sound Navy Yard, on 21 November 1917. The three submarines arrived at the Naval Submarine Base New London, at Groton, Connecticut, on 7 February 1918. From there, with World War I in progress, N-3 patrolled along the New England coast and off Long Island.

In July 1918, N-3 was the target of a friendly fire incident in the predawn hours of 23 July, while on patrol in the Atlantic Ocean. N-3 was lying on the surface charging her batteries in calm, hazy weather, with bright moonlight, when at 02:55, she suddenly sighted, at a range of only 1,800 yards (1.0 mi; 1.6 km), one of the ships of a convoy of five troop transports. The convoy had departed New York City, on 21 July, carrying US troops to Europe. The British armed transport Minnekahda, carrying 3,800 US troops, soon also appeared, headed straight at N-3, and only about 200 yd (600 ft; 180 m) away. N-3 immediately made a preliminary recognition signal by firing a green flare, then sent a recognition signal by blinker light. Minnekahda did not respond, except to blow her steam whistle. N-3's crew heard someone aboard Minnekahda order "Fire". As N-3 continued to flash the recognition signal by blinker light, N-3's commanding officer hailed Minnekahda, calling out, "Don't fire, this is an American submarine". At that instant, one of Minnekahda's guns fired a 6-or-7.5-inch (152 or 191 mm) round, according to different sources, and the shell hit N-3 forward at the waterline, failing to explode but inflicting considerable damage and causing leaks. Minnekahda closed to a range of 50 yd (150 ft; 46 m), close enough for N-3's crew to see men aboard Minnekahda, and hear them receive an order to load. As N-3 continued to flash the recognition signal, several men on N3's deck yelled, "Don't fire", and "Don't shoot, this is the N-3". Finally, someone on Minnekahda asked where N-3's flag was. N-3's crew immediately brought a United States flag on deck and shined a light on it. Minnekahda promptly ceased fire. The US Navy destroyer Preble, serving as one of the convoy's escorts, approached at flank speed, as if to ram N-3, and N-3 made recognition signals and backed at full speed, avoiding a collision with Preble, by only a few feet. N-3 hailed Preble, which stopped and sent a boat to N-3 to assess her damage. N-3 had suffered no crew casualties, but Minnekahda's unexploded shell was found in N-3's forward superstructure, and N-3's torpedo compartment was partially flooded. After pumping 2,800 US gal (11,000 L; 2,300 imp gal) of diesel fuel overboard to lighten herself forward, N-3 proceeded to New York Navy Yard. in Brooklyn, on the surface under her own power.

Following permanent repairs, at the New York Navy Yard, N-3 returned to the Submarine School, at New London, for patrol and training duty through 1920. When the US Navy adopted its hull classification system on 17 July 1920, she received the hull number SS-55.

Departing New London on 1 June 1921, N-3 proceeded to Toledo, Ohio. One of the first submarines to navigate the St. Lawrence River, and the Great Lakes, she put in at three ports in Canada, Halifax, Nova Scotia; Montreal, Quebec; and Port Dalhousie, Ontario, before arriving at Toledo. on 25 June 1921. She remained there for 11 days, open to the public for inspection. Departing on 6 July 1921, she returned to Naval Submarine Base New London, arriving on 20 July 1921.

On 16 August 1923, N-3 was damaged in a collision with the Green Fleet Company's tanker Monree, off of New London. The Navy Department reported that the submarine's periscope was "carried away", and the submarine's conning tower was considerably damaged. No crew members were injured in the incident and the submarine was able to return to port on her own.

From New London, N-3 subsequently cruised along the east coast of North America, from Halifax to Philadelphia, Pennsylvania, conducting training cruises.

== Fate ==
Departing New London, she headed for the Philadelphia Navy Yard, on League Island, in Philadelphia, where she decommissioned on 30 April 1926. She was struck from the Naval Vessel Register on 18 December 1930, and was scrapped in mid-1931.

== Bibliography ==
- "Table 21 - Ships on Navy List June 30, 1919". Congressional Serial Set. U.S. Government Printing Office: 768. 1921.
- Priolo, Gary. "N-3 (SS-55)". Navsource.net.
- Friedman, Norman (1995). U.S. Submarines Through 1945: An Illustrated Design History. Annapolis, Maryland: Naval Institute Press. ISBN 1-55750-263-3.
- Gardiner, Robert & Gray, Randal (1985). Conway's All the World's Fighting Ships 1906–1921. Annapolis, Maryland: Naval Institute Press. ISBN 0-85177-245-5.
- Cressman, Robert J. (21 July 2025). "N-3 (Submarine No. 55)". Dictionary of American Naval Fighting Ships. Navy Department, Naval History and Heritage Command. This article incorporates text from this source, which is in the public domain.
- Doughty, Leonard Jr. Lieutenant Commander (October 1934). "Mistaken Attacks in the World War".
- "Submarine N-3 Damaged". New York Times. 17 August 1923. p. 2.
