= O16 =

O16 or O-16 may refer to:

- Curtiss O-16 Falcon, an observation aircraft of the United States Army Air Corps
- HNLMS O 16, a submarine of the Royal Netherlands Navy
- Oxygen-16, an isotope of oxygen
- USS O-16 (SS-77), a submarine of the United States Navy
