= USS S-3 =

S-class submarine of the United States

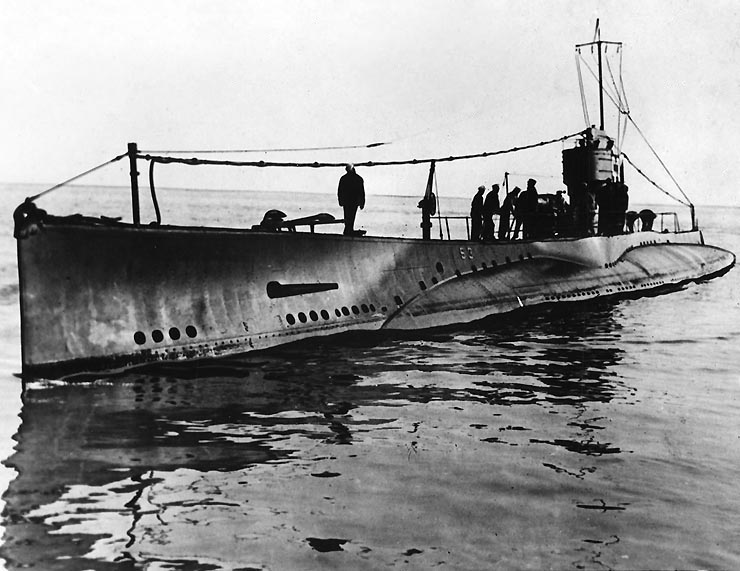
- USS S-3 (SS-107), photographed in 1927

History

United States
- Name: S-3
- Builder: Portsmouth Navy Yard, on Seavey Island, Kittery, Maine
- Cost: $1,659,115.76 (hull and machinery)
- Laid down: 16 August 1917
- Launched: 21 December 1918
- Sponsored by: Mrs. Katherine Hill
- Commissioned: 30 January 1919
- Decommissioned: 24 March 1931
- Stricken: 25 January 1937
- Identification: Hull symbol: SS-107 (17 July 1920); Call sign: NIMK
- Fate: Sold for scrapping

General characteristics
- Class & type: S-3-class submarine
- Displacement: 875 long tons (889 t) surfaced; 1,088 long tons (1,105 t) submerged
- Length: 231 feet (70 m)
- Beam: 21 ft 10 in (6.65 m)
- Draft: 13 ft 1 in (3.99 m)
- Installed power: 1,400 brake horsepower (1,044 kW) diesel; 1,200 hp (895 kW) electric
- Propulsion: 2 × NELSECO diesel engines; 2 × Westinghouse Electric Corporation electric motors; 1 × 120-cell batteries; 2 × Propellers
- Speed: 15 knots (28 km/h; 17 mph) surfaced; 11 kn (20 km/h; 13 mph) submerged
- Test depth: 200 ft (61 m)
- Capacity: 36,950 US gallons (139,900 L; 30,770 imp gal) fuel
- Complement: 4 officers; 34 enlisted
- Armament: 4 × 21-inch (533 mm) torpedo tubes (12 torpedoes); 1 × 4-inch (102 mm)/50-caliber (refit)

USS S-3 (SS-107), also known as "Submarine No. 107", was the prototype of the "Navy"-type S-class submarines of the United States Navy.

== Design ==
In the summer of 1916, The US Navy's Bureau of Construction and Repair (BuC&R) and Bureau of Steam Engineering, developed specifications for an 800 long tons (810 t) submarine that would be capable of crossing the Atlantic and fight while there. In Fiscal Year 1917 appropriations, they awarded contracts for the first three of these new boats, to be called the S-class. All were to have the same general specifications and tactical capabilities but were to be built by different manufacturers to different design types. The intent was to study the three FY-17 boats in order to eventually consolidate the best features of each into one type. However, all were intended for series production from the start, with the consolidation to come later in follow-on appropriations.

S-3 a double hull design, by BuC&R, and built at the government owned Portsmouth Navy Yard, the boats built to this design were referred to as the S-3-class, "Navy Yard"-type, or even "Government"-type. S-1 was built to an axially oriented single hull design by the Electric Boat Company, the boats that would follow this design were referred to as the S-1-class, or "Holland"-type, boats. S-2 was another double hull design with ventrally mounted control surfaces by the Lake Torpedo Boat Company, while this is referred to as the S-2-class or "Lake"-type, this design was not repeated.

== Construction ==
S-3's keel was laid down on 29 August 1917, by the Portsmouth Naval Shipyard, in Kittery, Maine. She was launched on 21 December 1918, sponsored by Mrs. Katherine Hill, wife of Medal of Honor recipient, William Lowell Hill, and commissioned on 30 January 1919.

== Service history ==
Following outfitting and trials, S-3 began her career with training operations along the New England coast. operating out of Portsmouth, New Hampshire, and New London, Connecticut.

When the US Navy adopted its hull classification system on 17 July 1920, she received the hull number SS-105.

In 1920, she twice visited Havana, Cuba: first in January, and again in December.

In July 1921, she was attached to Submarine Division 12 (SubDiv 12), which along with SubDiv 18, was to rendezvous off Portsmouth, for the longest voyage on record, at that time, for American submarines. The two divisions were assigned to the Asiatic Fleet, as Submarine Flotilla 3 (SubFlot 3), at the Cavite Naval Station, in the Philippine Islands. They sailed via the Panama Canal, to Pearl Harbor, where S-3 was detached and reassigned to operate on the West Coast, from Mare Island, California. The two divisions continued on and successfully completed the voyage, arriving at Cavite, on 1 December 1921.

S-3 departed Pearl Harbor, on 9 November 1921, and sailed to the West Coast, where she operated until mid-July 1923. On 17 July, she took departure from San Francisco Bay, to retransit the Panama Canal, en route to New London.

Reaching New London on 5 September 1923, she was attached to SubDiv 2, Atlantic Fleet, and assigned experimental duty at the Submarine School, at New London, assuming the duties of S-1, flagboat of SubDiv 2, which was conducting special experiments with aircraft. During the remainder of 1923, and the years following into 1927, she ranged the East Coast, conducting training operations and evaluating new techniques in submarine development.

In July 1927, S-3 and S-1 formed SubDiv 4, and began a schedule which included operational cruises to the Panama Canal Zone, in the spring months of 1928–1930. The remaining months of those years were spent in operations along the New England coast.

== Fate ==
Early in 1931, S-3 was ordered to the Philadelphia Navy Yard, for inactivation. She was decommissioned there on 24 March, and laid up. She was struck from the Naval Vessel Register on 25 January 1937, and subsequently scrapped.

== Bibliography ==
- "Table 21 - Ships on Navy List June 30, 1919". Congressional Serial Set. U.S. Government Printing Office: 770. 1921.
- Friedman, Norman (1995). U.S. Submarines Through 1945: An Illustrated Design History. Annapolis, Maryland: Naval Institute Press. ISBN 1-55750-263-3.
- Priolo, Gary. "S-3 (SS-107)". Navsource.net.
- Hall, Anne Martin (1925). Ships of the United States navy and their sponsors, 1913-1923.
- "S-3". Dictionary of American Naval Fighting Ships. Navy Department, Naval History and Heritage Command. 1 September 2015. This article incorporates text from this source, which is in the public domain.
- Johnston, David L. (October 2025). "A Visual Guide to the S-class Submarines, Part 1" (PDF) (5th ed.).
