= SS-77 =

SS-77, SS 77 or SS77 may refer to:

- USS O-16 (SS-77), a United States Navy submarine which saw service during World War I
- Vektor SS-77, a machine gun manufactured by the South African company Denel Land Systems
- Texas State Highway Spur 77, a road in the State of Texas, United States
