= USS S-49 =

Submarine of the United States sunk in 1942

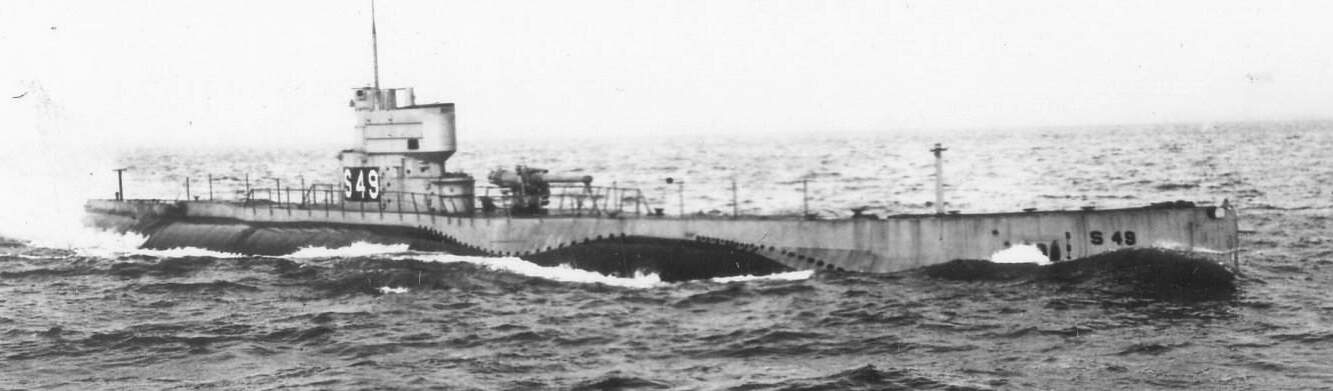

History

United States
- Name: USS S-49
- Builder: Lake Torpedo Boat Company, Bridgeport, Connecticut
- Laid down: 22 October 1920
- Launched: 23 April 1921
- Sponsored by: Mrs. Joseph E. Austin
- Commissioned: 6 June 1922
- Decommissioned: 2 August 1927
- Stricken: 21 March 1931
- Fate: Sold 25 May 1931; Sank 16 December 1942

General characteristics
- Class & type: S-class submarine
- Displacement: 993 long tons (1,009 t) surfaced; 1,230 long tons (1,250 t) submerged
- Length: 240 ft (73 m)
- Beam: 21 ft 10 in (6.65 m)
- Draft: 13 ft 6 in (4.11 m)
- Speed: 14.6 knots (16.8 mph; 27.0 km/h) surfaced; 11 knots (13 mph; 20 km/h) submerged
- Complement: 38 officers and men
- Armament: 1 × 4 in (102 mm)/50 deck gun; 5 × 21 inch (533 mm) torpedo tubes

USS S-49 (SS-160) was a fourth-group (S-48) S-class submarine of the United States Navy.

== Construction and commissioning ==
S-49's keel was laid down on 22 October 1920 by the Lake Torpedo Boat Company in Bridgeport, Connecticut. She was launched on 23 April 1921, sponsored by Mrs. Joseph E. Austin, and commissioned at Bridgeport on 6 June 1922 with Lieutenant Ingram C. Sowell in command.

== Service history ==
S-49 remained at Bridgeport through July 1922, but in August 1922 she moved down to the Submarine Base at New London, Connecticut, where she joined Submarine Division Zero, composed of units engaged in submarine research and development. Later reassigned to Submarine Division 4 and then to Submarine Division 2, she continued experimental work, including aerial visibility tests and torpedo development, and also participated in regularly scheduled exercises, primarily in the New London area, into 1926. At the end of January 1926, she proceeded to Portsmouth Navy Yard at Kittery, Maine, for a regular overhaul.

On 2 April 1926, S-49 returned to New London, but on 20 April 1926 her operating schedule was again interrupted. At about 07:50 that morning, S-49’s engines were started. Seven minutes later, just as a pilot cell cover was removed to test the specific gravity of the electrolyte, the forward battery exploded. The hydrogen gas explosion destroyed the battery cells in the forward half of the battery and forced up the battery deck. Ten men were injured, two others were gassed during rescue operations, and four of the twelve died of their injuries. The battery compartment was sealed and kept shut until mid-afternoon on 20 April, when the outboard battery vent was opened. During the night, the submarine took on a slight list to port and S-49′s crew used air pressure to keep ballast. At about 05:15 on 21 April, a second explosion occurred in the battery room when wash from vessels departing for torpedo practice rocked S-49. The compartment was resealed for another few hours, after which the work of clearing the wreckage was begun.

Following repairs, S-49 resumed operations off the New England coast, and in January 1927 moved south with the submarine USS S-50 for exercises and tests off Key West, Florida, the Dry Tortugas, and in Tampa Bay on the coast of Florida. On 12 March 1927 she returned to New London, from which she completed a run to Portsmouth, New Hampshire, and back before proceeding to Philadelphia, Pennsylvania, with S-50, for inactivation. Arriving on 31 March 1927, she was decommissioned on 2 Augus1927 t and berthed with other reserve ships at League Island in Philadelphia until struck from the Naval Vessel Register on 21 March 1931 in accordance with the London Naval Treaty. S-49 was sold to the Boston Iron and Metal Company of Baltimore, Maryland, on 25 May 1931.

== Sinking ==
The U.S. Navy apparently reacquired S-49 about 1941 at Baltimore "as equipment" for use in experimental work at the Naval Mine Warfare Proving Ground, Solomons, Maryland. During this work, she sank on 16 December 1942 in 102 feet (31 m) of water in the Patuxent River at 38°19′53.2″N 076°29′17.2″W on a bearing of 318.5 degrees true, distant 525 yards (480 m), from the southern tip of Point Patience, Maryland.
