= USS N-1 =

N-class submarine of the United States

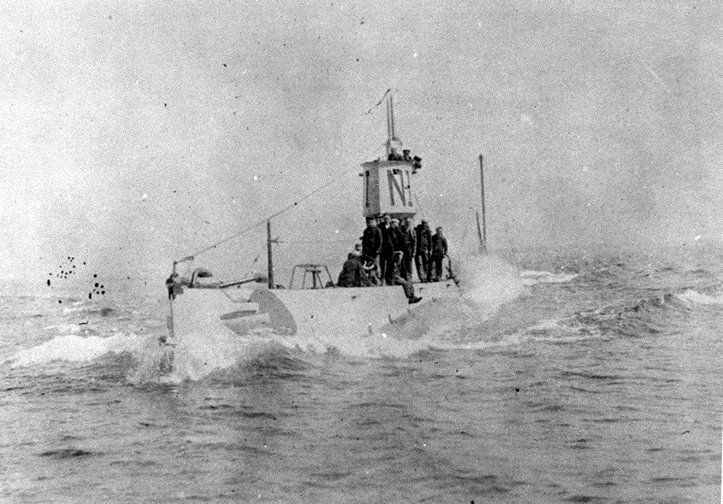
- Bow view of USS N-1, operating near the New London Submarine Base, Connecticut, in 1919

History

United States
- Name: N-1
- Builder: Seattle Construction and Drydock Company, Seattle, Washington
- Cost: $474,118.32 (hull and machinery)
- Laid down: 26 July 1915
- Launched: 30 December 1916
- Sponsored by: Mrs. Mabel Davis
- Commissioned: 26 September 1917
- Decommissioned: 30 April 1926
- Stricken: 18 December 1930
- Identification: Hull symbol: SS-53 (17 July 1920); Call sign: NZE
- Fate: Scrapped, early 1931

General characteristics
- Class & type: N-class submarine
- Displacement: 347 long tons (353 t) surfaced; 414 long tons (421 t) submerged
- Length: 147 ft 3 in (44.88 m)
- Beam: 15 ft 9 in (4.80 m)
- Draft: 12 ft 6 in (3.81 m)
- Installed power: 480 bhp (360 kW) diesel; 560 hp (420 kW) electric
- Propulsion: 2 × NELSECO 240V8FS Diesel engines; 2 × Electro Dynamic electric motors; 2 × 60-cell batteries, 2 × Propellers
- Speed: 13 kn (24 km/h; 15 mph) surfaced; 11 kn (20 km/h; 13 mph) submerged
- Range: 3,500 nmi (6,500 km; 4,000 mi) at 11 kn surfaced
- Test depth: 200 ft (61 m)
- Capacity: 6,058 US gal (22,930 L; 5,044 imp gal) fuel
- Complement: 2 officers; 23 enlisted
- Armament: 4 × 18 inch (450 mm) bow torpedo tubes (8 torpedoes)

USS N-1 (SS-53), also known as "Submarine No. 53", was the lead ship of her class of coastal submarines of the United States Navy commissioned during World War I. She spent the war patrolling off the coast of New England, and was decommissioned after less than ten years in service.

== Design ==
The N-class boats designed by Electric Boat, N-1 throughN-3, also referred to as the N-1-class, were built to slightly different specifications from the other N-class submarines, which were designed by Lake Torpedo Boat, referred to as the N-4-class. The Electric Boat submarines had a length of 147 ft 3 in (44.9 m) overall, a beam of 15 ft 9 in (4.8 m), and a mean draft of 12 feet 6 inches (3.8 m). They displaced 347 long tons (353 t) on the surface and 414 long tons (421 t) submerged. The Electric Boat submarines had a crew of 2 officers and 23 enlisted men. They had a diving depth of 200 ft (61.0 m).

For surface running, the Electric Boat submarines were powered by two 240-brake-horsepower (179 kW) NELSECO 240V8FS diesel engines, each driving one propeller shaft. When submerged each propeller was driven by a 280-horsepower (209 kW) Electro Dynamic electric motor. They could reach 13 knots (24 km/h; 15 mph) on the surface and 11 kn (20 km/h; 13 mph) underwater. On the surface, the boats had a range of 3,500 nautical miles (6,500 km; 4,000 mi) at 11 kn and 30 nautical miles (56 km; 35 mi) at 5 kn (9.3 km/h; 5.8 mph) submerged.

The boats were armed with four 18-inch (450 mm) torpedo tubes in the bow. They carried four reloads, for a total of eight torpedoes.

== Construction ==
N-1's keel was laid down on 26 July 1915, by the Seattle Construction and Drydock Company, in Seattle, Washington. She was launched on 30 December 1916, sponsored by Mrs. Mabel Davis, and commissioned on 26 September 1917.

== Service history ==
Designed as a coast defense submarine,N-1 was fitted out at the Puget Sound Navy Yard, in Bremerton, Washington, and then departed on 21 November 1917, for San Francisco, California, in company with her sisters, N-2 and N-3. Reassigned to the East Coast, she departed San Francisco, on 13 December, for Balboa, in the Panama Canal Zone, and thence proceeded via Cristobal, Jamaica, Key West, Florida, and Norfolk, Virginia, to New London, Connecticut, arriving on 7 February 1918.

Reporting for duty to Commander, First Naval District, the submarine began her first patrol on 23 June 1918, by hunting for a U-boat reported in the vicinity of Cape Cod. After an intensive search, N-1 continued her patrol off the New England coast. For the remainder of the war and until early 1922, N-1 continued her operations in the area from New London to Bar Harbor.

Placed in reduced commission on 1 May 1922, N-1 became a training submarine for the Submarine School, New London. She continued this duty until ordered to Philadelphia Navy Yard on 9 December 1925.

== Fate ==
Arriving at Philadelphia, Pennsylvania, on 18 December, she was decommissioned on 30 April 1926. Struck from the Naval Vessel Register on 18 December 1930, N-1 was scrapped in early 1931.

== Bibliography ==
- "Table 21 - Ships on Navy List June 30, 1919". Congressional Serial Set. U.S. Government Printing Office: 768. 1921.
- Mohl, Michael. "N-1 (SS-53)". Navsource.net.
- Friedman, Norman (1995). U.S. Submarines Through 1945: An Illustrated Design History. Annapolis, Maryland: Naval Institute Press. ISBN 1-55750-263-3.
- Gardiner, Robert & Gray, Randal (1985). Conway's All the World's Fighting Ships 1906–1921. Annapolis, Maryland: Naval Institute Press. ISBN 0-85177-245-5.
- Cressman, Robert J. (16 July 2025). "N-1 (Submarine No. 53)". Dictionary of American Naval Fighting Ships. Navy Department, Naval History and Heritage Command. This article incorporates text from this source, which is in the public domain.
