= USS N-4 =

N-class submarine of the United States

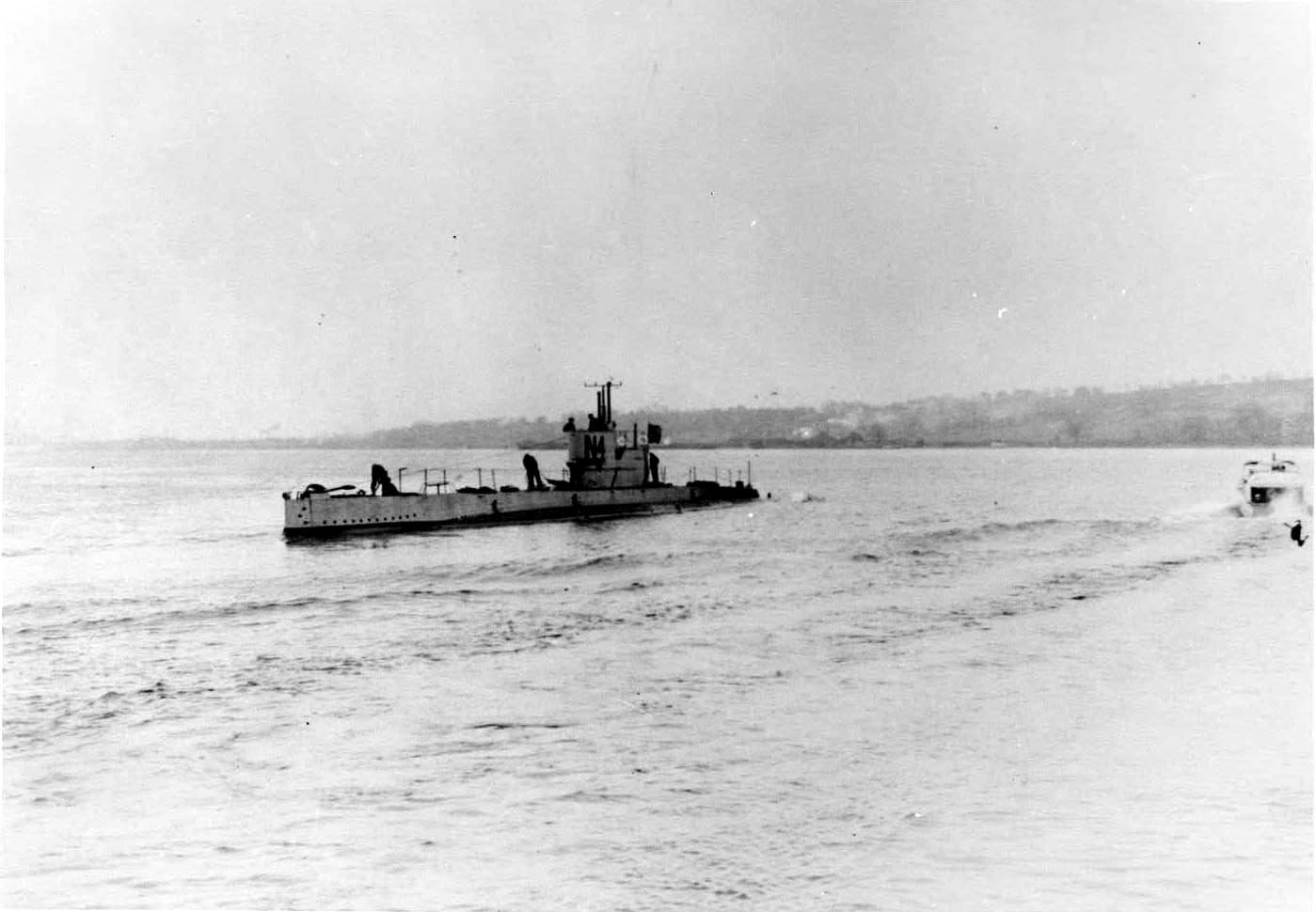
- USS N-4 off the New London Submarine Base, Groton, Connecticut, in 1919

History

United States
- Name: N-4
- Builder: Lake Torpedo Boat Company, Bridgeport, Connecticut
- Cost: $465,608.76 (hull and machinery)
- Laid down: 24 March 1915
- Launched: 27 November 1916
- Sponsored by: Miss Dorothy Hastings Elliott
- Commissioned: 15 June 1918
- Decommissioned: 22 April 1922
- Identification: Hull symbol: SS-56 (17 July 1920); Call sign: NZH
- Fate: Sold for scrap, 25 September 1922

General characteristics
- Class & type: N-class submarine
- Displacement: 331 long tons (336 t) surfaced; 385 long tons (391 t) submerged
- Length: 155 ft 3 in (47.32 m)
- Beam: 14 feet 6 inches (4.42 m)
- Draft: 12 ft 4 in (3.76 m)
- Installed power: 600 bhp (450 kW) diesel; 300 hp (220 kW) electric
- Propulsion: Diesel-electric; 2 × Busch-Sulzer diesel engines; 2 × Diehl electric motors; 2 × 60-cell batteries; 2 × Propellers
- Speed: 13 kn surfaced; 11 kn submerged
- Test depth: 200 ft
- Complement: 3 officers; 26 enlisted
- Armament: 4 × 18-inch bow torpedo tubes, 8 torpedoes

USS N-4 (SS-56), also known as "Submarine No. 56", was an N-class coastal submarine of the United States Navy commissioned during World War I. She spent the war patrolling off the coast of New England, and was decommissioned after less than four years in service.

== Design ==
The N-class boats designed by Electric Boat, N-1 throughN-3, also referred to as the N-1-class, were built to slightly different specifications from the other N-class submarines, which were designed by Lake Torpedo Boat, referred to as the N-4-class. The Lake submarines had a length of 155 ft (47.2 m) overall, a beam of 14 ft 6 in (4.4 m), and a mean draft of 12 feet 4 inches (3.8 m). They displaced 331 long tons (336 t) on the surface and 385 long tons (391 t) submerged. The Lake submarines had a crew of 3 officers and 26 enlisted men. They had a diving depth of 200 ft (61.0 m).

For surface running, the Lake submarines were powered by two 300-brake-horsepower (224 kW) Busch-Sulzer diesel engines, each driving one propeller shaft. When submerged each propeller was driven by a 150-horsepower (112 kW) Diehl electric motor. They could reach 13 knots (24 km/h; 15 mph) on the surface and 11 kn (20 km/h; 13 mph) underwater.

The boats were armed with four 18-inch (450 mm) torpedo tubes in the bow. They carried four reloads, for a total of eight torpedoes.

== Construction ==
N-4's keel was laid down on 24 March 1915, by the Lake Torpedo Boat Company, in Bridgeport, Connecticut. She was launched on 27 November 1916, sponsored by Miss Dorothy Hastings Elliott, and commissioned at the New York Navy Yard, on 15 June 1918.

== Service history ==
Departing New York, on 25 June 1918, N-4 proceeded to the New London Submarine Base for outfitting and then she proceeded to the Torpedo Station, at Newport, Rhode Island. Returning to New London, on 11 July, she once again departed on 28 July, to patrol along the New England coast and guard coastal shipping against German U-boats. Alternating out of New London and New York City, she continued this duty until 3 November.

The signing of the Armistice with Germany found N-4 tied up at New London, where, but for a training cruise to Salem, Massachusetts, and Portland, Maine, from 14 July to 30 September 1919, she remained until 1920.

During the first half of 1920, N-4 made short voyages to New York and Newport, before she was placed in reserve at New London, on 7 June 1920. Her identification number was changed from "Submarine No. 56" to SS-56 on 17 July 1920. Taken out of reserve in early September, N-4 sailed for Philadelphia, Pennsylvania, on 15 September, for extensive overhaul until 28 March 1921.

== Fate ==
Returning to New London in early April, she operated off the New England coast, out of Newport and New London, until she put into New London, on 6 December, to have her main engines removed and transferred to a newer L-class submarine. The fleet tug Sagamore then towed the hulk of N-4 to Philadelphia.

She arrived on 13 April 1922, and was decommissioned on 22 April. The submarine was sold for scrapping on 25 September 1922, to Joseph G. Hitner, of Philadelphia.

== Bibliography ==
- "Table 21 - Ships on Navy List June 30, 1919". Congressional Serial Set. U.S. Government Printing Office: 768. 1921.
- Priolo, Gary. "N-4 (SS-56)". Navsource.net.
- Friedman, Norman (1995). U.S. Submarines Through 1945: An Illustrated Design History. Annapolis, Maryland: Naval Institute Press. ISBN 1-55750-263-3.
- Gardiner, Robert & Gray, Randal (1985). Conway's All the World's Fighting Ships 1906–1921. Annapolis, Maryland: Naval Institute Press. ISBN 0-85177-245-5.
- Cressman, Robert J. (21 July 2025). "N-4 (Submarine No. 56)". Dictionary of American Naval Fighting Ships. Navy Department, Naval History and Heritage Command. This article incorporates text from this source, which is in the public domain.
