= USS L-5 =

L-class submarine of the United States

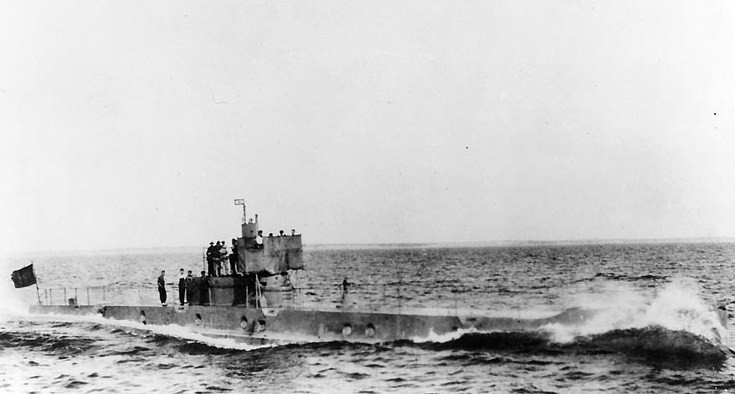
- USS L-5 underway, probably at Provincetown, Massachusetts, 15 August 1917

History

United States
- Name: L-5
- Builder: Lake Torpedo Boat Company, Bridgeport, Connecticut
- Cost: $590,038.59 (hull and machinery)
- Laid down: 14 May 1914
- Launched: 1 May 1916
- Sponsored by: Miss Rosalind Robinson
- Commissioned: 17 February 1918
- Decommissioned: 5 December 1922
- Stricken: 20 March 1925
- Identification: Hull symbol: SS-44 (17 July 1920); Call sign: NYR
- Fate: Sold for scrapping, 21 December 1925

General characteristics
- Type: L-class submarine
- Displacement: 456 long tons (463 t) surfaced; 524 long tons (532 t) submerged
- Length: 165 ft (50 m)
- Beam: 14 ft 9 in (4.50 m)
- Draft: 13 ft 3 in (4.04 m)
- Installed power: 1,200 bhp (890 kW) (diesel); 800 hp (600 kW) (electric)
- Propulsion: 2 × Busch-Sulzer diesel engines; 2 × Diehl Manufacture Co. electric motors
- Speed: 14 kn (26 km/h; 16 mph) surfaced; 10.5 kn (19.4 km/h; 12.1 mph) submerged
- Range: 3,300 nmi (6,100 km; 3,800 mi) at 11 kn (20 km/h; 13 mph) surfaced; 150 nmi (280 km; 170 mi) at 5 kn (9.3 km/h; 5.8 mph) submerged
- Test depth: 200 ft (61.0 m)
- Complement: 2 officers; 26 enlisted
- Armament: 4 × 18 inch (450 mm) bow torpedo tubes (8 torpedoes); 1 × 3 in (76 mm)/23 caliber deck gun

USS L-5 (SS-44), also known as "Submarine No. 44", was an L-class submarine of the United States Navy. She worked on submarine tactics off the East Coast, prior to sailing to the Azores, during WWI. After the war she transferred to the Pacific, where she worked with experimental torpedoes and underwater detection equipment.

== Design ==
The L-class boats designed by Lake Torpedo Boat (L-5 through L-8) were built to slightly different specifications from the other L boats, which were designed by Electric Boat, and are sometimes considered a separate L-5 class. The Lake boats had a length of 165 ft (50.3 m) overall, a beam of 14 ft 9 in (4.5 m), and a mean draft of 13 feet 3 inches (4.0 m). They displaced 456 long tons (463 t) on the surface and 527 long tons (535 t) submerged. The L-class submarines had a crew of two officers and 28 enlisted men. They had a diving depth of 200 ft (61.0 m).

For surface running, the boats were powered by two 600-brake-horsepower (447 kW) Busch-Sulzer diesel engines, each driving one propeller shaft. When submerged each propeller was driven by a 400-horsepower (298 kW) electric motor. They could reach 14 kn (26 km/h; 16 mph) on the surface and 10.5 kn (19.4 km/h; 12.1 mph) underwater. On the surface, the Lake boats had a range of 5,150 nmi (9,540 km; 5,930 mi), at 11 kn (20 km/h; 13 mph), and 150 nmi (280 km; 170 mi), at 5 kn (9.3 km/h; 5.8 mph), submerged.

The boats were armed with four 18-inch (450 mm) torpedo tubes in the bow. They carried four reloads, for a total of eight torpedoes. The L-class submarines were also armed with a single 3 in (76 mm)/23 caliber on a disappearing mount.

== Construction ==
L-5's keel was laid down on 14 May 1914, by the Lake Torpedo Boat Company, in Bridgeport, Connecticut. She was launched on 1 May 1916, sponsored by Miss Rosalind Robinson, and commissioned on 17 February 1918.

== Service history ==
After participating in exercises along the Atlantic coast, L-5 departed Charleston, South Carolina, on 15 October 1918, with Submarine Division 6, and reached the Azores, on 7 November. Following the Armistice with Germany on 11 November, L-5 headed west, arriving at Bermuda, on 1 December. She participated in exercises in the Caribbean Sea before steaming on to San Pedro, California, where she arrived 13 February 1919.

From 1919 to 1922, she remained on the West Coast, experimenting with new torpedoes and underseas detection equipment.

L-5 departed San Pedro, on 25 July 1922, and after visits in Mexico, Nicaragua, and the Panama Canal Zone, she arrived Hampton Roads, Virginia, on 28 September.

== Fate ==
L-5 remained there until she decommissioned on 5 December 1922. She was sold on 21 December 1925, to Passaic Salvage and Reclamation Company, in Newark, New Jersey, and subsequently scrapped.

== Bibliography ==
- "Table 21 - Ships on Navy List June 30, 1919". Congressional Serial Set. U.S. Government Printing Office: 767. 1921.
- Priolo, Gary. "L-5 (SS-44)". Navsource.net.
- Friedman, Norman (1995). U.S. Submarines Through 1945: An Illustrated Design History. Annapolis, Maryland: Naval Institute Press. ISBN 1-55750-263-3.
- Gardiner, Robert & Gray, Randal (1985). Conway's All the World's Fighting Ships 1906–1921. Annapolis, Maryland: Naval Institute Press. ISBN 0-85177-245-5.
- Cressman, Robert J. (26 May 2020). "L-5 (Submarine No. 44)". Dictionary of American Naval Fighting Ships. Navy Department, Naval History and Heritage Command. This article incorporates text from this source, which is in the public domain.
