= United States N-class submarine =

United States Navy submarine class

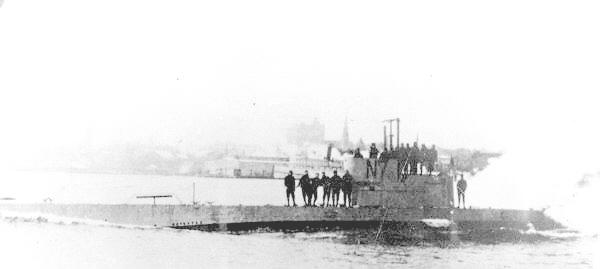
- Portside view of USS N-7, underway in harbor, c. 1918-1922

Class overview
- Name: N-1 class
- Builders: Electric Boat Company design: Seattle Construction and Drydock Company, Seattle, Washington (N-1 to N-3) (Electric Boat Company design); Lake Torpedo Boat Company design: Lake Torpedo Boat Company, Bridgeport, Connecticut (N-4 to N-7)
- Operators: United States Navy
- Preceded by: AA-1 class
- Succeeded by: O class
- Built: 1915–1917
- In commission: 1917–1926
- Planned: 7
- Completed: 7
- Scrapped: 7

General characteristics
- Class & type: N-1-class (N-1 to N-3)
- Type: Submarine
- Displacement: 347 long tons (353 t) surfaced; 414 long tons (421 t) submerged
- Length: 147 ft 3 in (44.88 m)
- Beam: 15 ft 9 in (4.80 m)
- Draft: 12 ft 6 in (3.81 m)
- Installed power: 480 bhp (360 kW) diesel; 560 hp (420 kW) electric
- Propulsion: 2 × NELSECO 240V8FS Diesel engines; 2 × Electro Dynamic electric motors; 2 × 60-cell batteries, 2 × Propellers
- Speed: 13 kn (24 km/h; 15 mph) surfaced; 11 kn (20 km/h; 13 mph) submerged
- Range: 3,500 nmi (6,500 km; 4,000 mi) at 11 kn surfaced
- Test depth: 200 ft (61 m)
- Complement: 2 officers; 23 enlisted
- Armament: 4 × 18 inch (450 mm) bow torpedo tubes (8 torpedoes)

General characteristics
- Class & type: N-4-class (N-4 to N-7)
- Type: Submarine
- Displacement: 331 long tons (336 t) surfaced; 385 long tons (391 t) submerged
- Length: 155 ft 3 in (47.32 m)
- Beam: 14 feet 6 inches (4.42 m)
- Draft: 12 ft 4 in (3.76 m)
- Installed power: 600 bhp (450 kW) diesel; 300 hp (220 kW) electric
- Propulsion: Diesel-electric; 2 × Busch-Sulzer Diesel engines; 2 × Diehl electric motors; 2 × 60-cell batteries; 2 × Propellers
- Speed: 13 kn surfaced; 11 kn submerged
- Test depth: 200 ft
- Complement: 3 officers; 26 enlisted
- Armament: 4 × 18-inch bow torpedo tubes, 8 torpedoes

The United States N-class submarines were a class of seven coastal defense submarines laid down for the United States Navy prior to the United States' entry into World War I. During the war they patrolled off of the New England coast.

== Design ==
The N-class boats were authorized under naval appropriations for Fiscal Year 1915. In order to be able to afford a fleet submarine in the same appropriations, eventually to become the AA-1 or T-class submarines, the US Navy (USN) reduced the amount of money allocated to coastal submarines significantly. This forced them to order a more austere and smaller design. The N-class would be over 100 long tons (100 t) smaller than the preceding L-class boats, and would be the smallest boats built for the USN until 1952.

The boats were constructed by two companies to different specifications; N-1, N-2, and N-3, were designed by the Electric Boat Company (EB), of Groton, Connecticut, and sub-contracted for construction to the Todd Dry Dock & Construction Company, in Seattle, Washington, and N-4, N-5, N-6, and N-7, were designed and built by the Lake Torpedo Boat Company, of Bridgeport, Connecticut. The N-boats built by Lake differ considerably from their EB brethren, but are of a similar size and have the same military characteristics, and therefore are considered the same class.

The Electric Boat submarines, referred to as the N-1-class, had a length of 147 ft 3 in (44.9 m) overall, a beam of 15 ft 9 in (4.8 m), and a mean draft of 12 ft 6 in (3.8 m). They displaced 347 long tons (353 t), on the surface, and 414 long tons (421 t), submerged. The N-1-class had a crew of 2 officers and 23 enlisted men. They had a diving depth of 200 ft (61.0 m).

The Lake submarines, referred to as the N-4-class, had a length of 155 ft (47.2 m) overall, a beam of 14 ft 6 in (4.4 m), and a mean draft of 12 ft 4 in (3.8 m). They displaced 331 long tons (336 t), on the surface, and 385 long tons (391 t), submerged. The N-4-class had a crew of 3 officers and 26 enlisted men. They also had a diving depth of 200 ft.

For surface running, the Electric Boat submarines were powered by two NELSECO 240V8FS 240-brake-horsepower (179 kW) diesel engines, each driving one propeller shaft. When submerged each propeller was driven by an Electro Dynamic 280-horsepower (209 kW) electric motor. The Lake boats had two Busch-Sulzer 6M50 300-brake-horsepower (224 kW) diesels, and two Diehl150-horsepower (112 kW) electric motors. Regardless of designer, the N-class submarines could reach 13 kn (24 km/h; 15 mph) on the surface, and 11 kn (20 km/h; 13 mph) underwater. On the surface, the boats had a range of 3,500 nautical miles (6,500 km; 4,000 mi) at 11 kn, and 30 nmi (56 km; 35 mi) at 5 kn (9.3 km/h; 5.8 mph) submerged.

The boats were armed with four 18-inch (450 mm) torpedo tubes in the bow. They carried four reloads, for a total of eight torpedoes. They were the last submarines to be designed without a deck gun until 1946. These boats retained the individual muzzle (outer) torpedo tube doors of the preceding L and M-classes.

This class was the first US Navy submarine class completed with metal bridge shields. These had been omitted from previous classes to increase underwater speed. The previous classes used piping-and-canvas temporary bridges for extended surface runs; these were found to be inadequate on North Atlantic patrols in World War I. All forward-deployed submarines were back-fitted with metal "chariot" bridge shields during the war. The coastal patrol nature of the small N-class submarines was emphasized by their lack of a deck gun.

== Service ==
Commissioned after the American entry into World War I, they were assigned to the 1st Naval District, primarily operating from Naval Submarine Base New London, with some boats operating out of New York City at times, all patrolling the New England coast.

Built during a time in which USN submarine strategy and tactics were rapidly changing, the N-class coastal patrol submarines proved to be too small to be really useful to a Navy that was finding itself on the world stage. The Lake boats in particular were disliked for poor habitability and reliability. They served only an average of 3.5 years while the EB design boats averaged 8.5 years of service.

By 1922, the EB boats were assigned to the Submarine School, New London, while the Lake boats were all scrapped in that year, their engines having been removed in 1921, to re-equip some of the L-class boats. The EB boats were decommissioned in 1926, and scrapped in 1931, to comply with the limits of the London Naval Treaty.

== Boats in class ==
The seven submarines of the N-class were:

Ship name	Hull class and no.	Builder	Laid Down	Launched	Commissioned	Decommissioned	Reclass. hull no.	Reclass. hull no. date	Fate
N-1	Submarine No. 53	Seattle Construction and Drydock Company , Seattle, Washington	26 July 1915	30 December 1916	26 September 1917	30 April 1926	SS-53	17 July 1920	Scrapped 1931
N-2	Submarine No. 54	Seattle Construction and Drydock Company , Seattle, Washington	29 July 1915	16 January 1917	26 September 1917	30 April 1926	SS-54	17 July 1920	Scrapped 1931
N-3	Submarine No. 55	Seattle Construction and Drydock Company , Seattle, Washington	31 July 1915	21 February 1917	26 September 1917	30 April 1926	SS-55	17 July 1920	Scrapped 1931
N-4	Submarine No. 56	Lake Torpedo Boat Company, Bridgeport, Connecticut	24 March 1915	27 November 1916	15 June 1918	22 April 1922	SS-56	17 July 1920	Sold for scrapping, 25 September 1922
N-5	Submarine No. 57	Lake Torpedo Boat Company, Bridgeport, Connecticut	10 April 1915	22 March 1917	13 June 1918	19 April 1922	SS-57	17 July 1920	Sold for scrapping, 25 September 1922
N-6	Submarine No. 58	Lake Torpedo Boat Company, Bridgeport, Connecticut	15 April 1915	21 April 1917	9 July 1918	16 February 1922	SS-58	17 July 1920	Sold for scrapping, 31 July 1922
N-7	Submarine No. 59	Lake Torpedo Boat Company, Bridgeport, Connecticut	20 April 1915	19 May 1917	15 June 1918	7 February 1922	SS-59	17 July 1920	Sold for scrapping, 5 June 1922

== Bibliography ==
- Friedman, Norman (1995). US Submarines through 1945: An Illustrated Design History. Annapolis, Maryland: Naval Institute Press. ISBN 1-55750-263-3.
- Hedman, Ric; Johnston, David (19 October 2025). "N-class Design and Construction Notes". Pigboats.com.
- Gardiner, Robert & Gray, Randal (1985). Conway's All the World's Fighting Ships 1906–1921. Annapolis, Maryland: Naval Institute Press. ISBN 0-85177-245-5.
