= USS O-16 =

O-class submarine of the United States

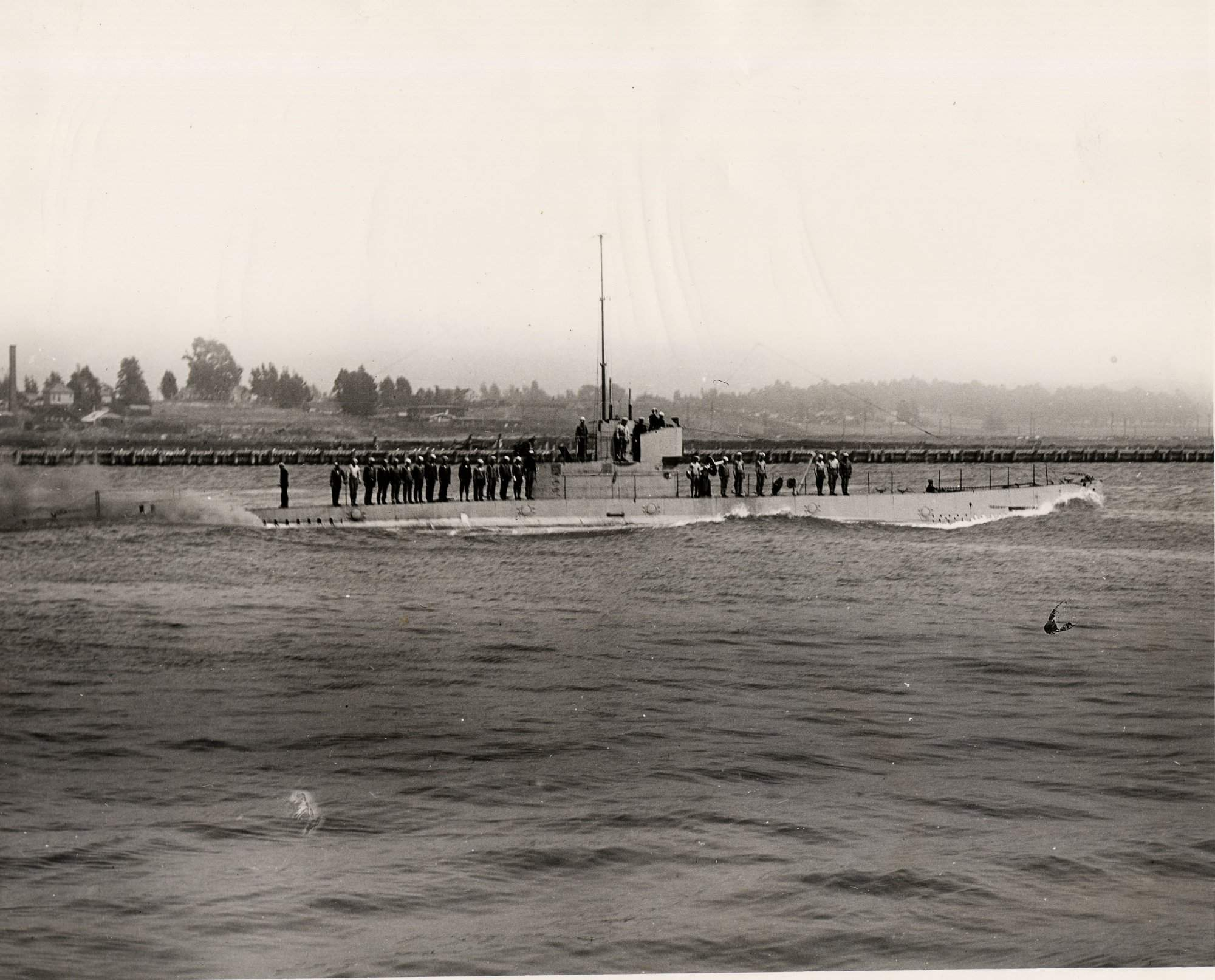
- USS O-16 off the Mare Island Navy Yard, Vallejo, California, on 3 September 1918

History

United States
- Name: O-16
- Ordered: 3 March 1916
- Builder: California Shipbuilding Company, at the Craig Shipbuilding Company, in Long Beach, California
- Cost: $611,083.50 (hull and machinery)
- Laid down: 7 October 1916
- Launched: 9 February 1918
- Sponsored by: Mrs. Juliet Mayfield
- Commissioned: 1 August 1918
- Decommissioned: 21 June 1924
- Stricken: 9 May 1930
- Identification: Hull symbol: SS-77 (17 July 1920); Call sign: NASM
- Fate: Sold for scrap, 30 July 1930

General characteristics
- Class & type: O-11-class submarine
- Displacement: 485 long tons (493 t) surfaced; 566 long tons (575 t) submerged
- Length: 175 ft (53 m)
- Beam: 16 ft 7 in (5.05 m)
- Draft: 13 ft 11 in (4.24 m)
- Installed power: 1,000 bhp (746 kW); 800 hp (597 kW)
- Propulsion: 2 × Busch-Sulzer diesel engines; 2 × Diehl Manufacture Company electric motors; 1 × 120-cell battery; 2 × shafts
- Speed: 14 kn surfaced; 11 kn (20 km/h; 13 mph) submerged
- Range: 5500 nmi at 11.5 kn surfaced; 250 nmi at 5 kn submerged
- Test depth: 200 ft
- Capacity: 18,588 US gal (70,360 L; 15,478 imp gal) fuel
- Complement: 2 officers; 27 enlisted
- Armament: 4 × 18 inch bow torpedo tubes (8 torpedoes); 1 × 3 in/23 caliber retractable deck gun

USS O-16 (SS-77), also known as "Submarine No. 77", was one of 16 O-class submarines of the United States Navy commissioned during World War I.

== Design ==
The later O-boats, O-11 through O-16, were designed by the Lake Torpedo Boat Company, to different specifications from the earlier boats designed by Electric Boat. They did not perform as well, and are sometimes considered a separate class. The submarines had a length of 175 ft (53.3 m) overall, a beam of 16 ft 7 in (5.1 m), and a mean draft of 13 ft 11 in (4.2 m). They displaced 485 long tons (493 t) on the surface and 566 long tons (575 t) submerged. The O-class submarines had a crew of 2 officers and 27 enlisted men. They had a diving depth of 200 ft (61.0 m).

For surface running, the boats were powered by two 500-brake-horsepower (373 kW) Busch-Sulzer diesel engines, each driving one propeller shaft. When submerged each propeller was driven by a 370-horsepower (276 kW) Diehl Manufacture Company electric motor. They could reach 14 knots (26 km/h; 16 mph) on the surface and 11 kn (20 km/h; 13 mph) underwater. On the surface, the O class had a range of 5,500 nautical miles (10,200 km; 6,300 mi) at 11.5 kn (21.3 km/h; 13.2 mph).

The boats were armed with four 18-inch (450 mm) torpedo tubes in the bow. They carried four reloads, for a total of eight torpedoes. The O-class submarines were also armed with a single 3 in (76 mm)/23 caliber retractable deck gun.

== Construction ==
O-16's keel was laid down on 7 October 1916, at the Craig Shipbuilding Company, in Long Beach, California, by the California Shipbuilding Company. She was launched on 9 February 1918, sponsored by Mrs. James J. Murphy, and completed at the Mare Island Navy Yard. O-16 was commissioned on 1 August 1918.

== Service history ==
Commissioning during the final months of World War I, O-16 had little wartime duty.

After the war, she reported to Cape May, New Jersey, where she went into dry dock on 20 September 1919. In October, the boat sailed to the Philadelphia Navy Yard, where a dangerous fire in her superstructure on 29 December, was brought under control before it did major damage.

When the US Navy adopted its hull classification system on 17 July 1920, she received the hull number SS-77.

In 1922, O-16 was stationed at Coco Solo, in the Panama Canal Zone, for diving tests and maneuvers. She cruised in formation with her sister boats O-12, O-14, O-15, and the submarine tender Bushnell, to Guantánamo Bay, Cuba, on 26 January, and continued maneuvers in and around the Virgin Islands. In April, she returned to Coco Solo, where electricians and engineers put her in prime condition.

== Fate ==
In November 1923, O-16 sailed to Philadelphia, where she decommissioned on 21 June 1924, after just five and a half years of service, and was turned over to the Commandant, Navy Yard, Philadelphia. Struck from the Naval Vessel Register on 9 May 1930, the boat was scrapped in accordance with the London Naval Treaty on 30 July 1930.

== Bibliography ==
- "Table 21 - Ships on Navy List June 30, 1919". Congressional Serial Set. U.S. Government Printing Office: 769. 1921.
- Gary, Priolo. "O-16 (SS-77)". Navsource.net.
- Friedman, Norman (1995). U.S. Submarines Through 1945: An Illustrated Design History. Annapolis, Maryland: Naval Institute Press. ISBN 1-55750-263-3.
- Gardiner, Robert & Gray, Randal (1985). Conway's All the World's Fighting Ships 1906–1921. Annapolis, Maryland: Naval Institute Press. ISBN 0-85177-245-5.
- "O-16". Dictionary of American Naval Fighting Ships. Navy Department, Naval History and Heritage Command. 17 August 2015. This article incorporates text from this source, which is in the public domain.
- Hall, Anne Martin (1925). Ships of the United States navy and their sponsors, 1913-1923.
- Colton, Tim (12 December 2021). "Craig Shipbuilding, Long Beach, CA".
