= Lake Torpedo Boat =

Coordinates: 41.167755°N 73.165817°W

Lake Torpedo Boat Company
- Industry: Submarines
- Founded: 1912
- Founder: Simon Lake
- Fate: Dissolved 1924
- Headquarters: Bridgeport, Connecticut
- Products: Submarines

The Lake Torpedo Boat Company of Bridgeport, Connecticut, was an early builder of submarines for the United States Navy in the early 20th century.

== History ==
Founded by Simon Lake in 1912, the company was located at the east end of Seaview Avenue in Bridgeport, Connecticut. Most of the submarines completed by Lake Torpedo Boat were completed from 1918 to 1922.

The firm competed with the Electric Boat Company until financial difficulties led to the company's demise in 1924. The Navy ceased awarding contracts to Lake shortly before that time, partly because USS S-2 (SS-106), the company's entry in the S-class submarine design competition, was not selected for further production. Only nine S-boats were built by Lake. Also, the yard was not physically able to build the large submarine cruisers then envisioned, such as USS Argonaut (SM-1). The Washington Naval Treaty's limits on submarines were also a major factor. At the time, the Navy wished to concentrate submarine construction at Navy Yards, particularly Portsmouth Navy Yard in Kittery, Maine.

The company completed 26 submarines for the US Navy, designed two US Navy submarines that were built in other yards, and built several other submarines for civilian use or that were not accepted by the Navy. Some of the submarines built by Lake for the Navy included several G-class, L-class, N-class, O-class, and R-class submarines. The company designed the Imperial Russian Navy's Osetr-class submarines, the first of which was Lake's Protector. The Kaiman-class submarines were also designed for Russia.

== Submarines built by the Lake Torpedo Boat Company ==
=== U.S. Navy submarines built in Bridgeport ===
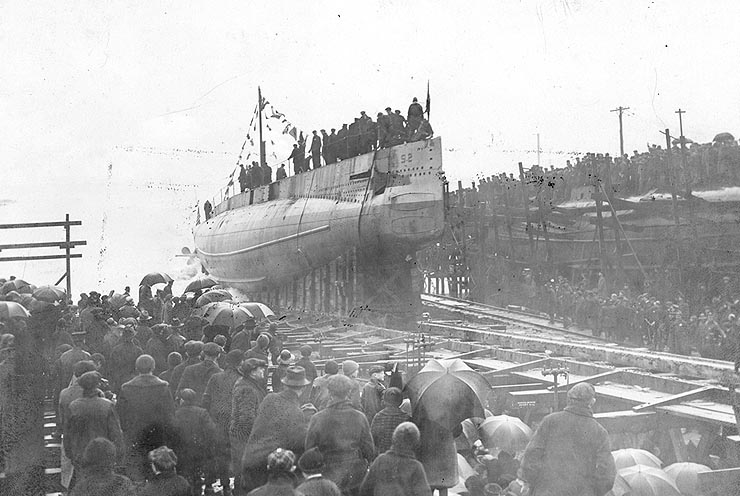
Launching of USS S-2, 15 February 1919

Years of service follow names.

- USS G-2 (SS-27) (1915–19) – Completed by New York Navy Yard. Sank after she was decommissioned.
- USS G-3 (SS-31) (1915–21) – Completed by New York Navy Yard.
- USS L-5 (SS-44) (1918–22)
- USS N-4 (SS-56) (1918–22)
- USS N-5 (SS-57) (1918–22)
- USS N-6 (SS-58) (1918–22)
- USS N-7 (SS-59) (1918–22)
- USS O-11 (SS-72) (1918–30)
- USS O-12 (SS-73) (1918–24) – Converted and renamed Nautilus for an expedition to the North Pole.
- USS O-13 (SS-74) (1918–24)
- USS R-21 (SS-98) (1919–24)
- USS R-22 (SS-99) (1919–25)
- USS R-23 (SS-100) (1919–25)
- USS R-24 (SS-101) (1919–25)
- USS R-25 (SS-102) (1919–24)
- USS R-26 (SS-103) (1919–25)
- USS R-27 (SS-104) (1919–25)
- USS S-2 (SS-106) (1920–29)
- USS S-14 (SS-119) (1921–45)
- USS S-15 (SS-120) (1921–46) – Last Lake submarine in service with the US Navy.
- USS S-16 (SS-121) (1920–44) – Sunk as a target in 1945.
- USS S-17 (SS-122) (1921–44) – Sunk as a target in 1945.
- USS S-48 (SS-159) (1922–45)
- USS S-49 (SS-160) (1922–27) – Used as a tourist attraction from 1931 to 1940.
- USS S-50 (SS-161) (1922–27)
- USS S-51 (SS-162) (1922–25) – Lost in collision with a merchant ship.

=== U.S. Navy submarines designed by Lake but built elsewhere ===
- USS G-1 (SS-19½) (1912–20) – Built by Newport News Shipbuilding.
- USS L-6 (SS-45) (1917–22) – Built by California Shipbuilding Company.
- USS L-7 (SS-46) (1917–22) – Built by California Shipbuilding Company.
- USS L-8 (SS-48) (1917–22) – Built by Portsmouth Naval Shipyard.
- USS O-14 (SS-75) (1918–24) – Built by California Shipbuilding Company.
- USS O-15 (SS-76) (1918–24) – Built by California Shipbuilding Company.
- USS O-16 (SS-77) (1918–24) – Built by California Shipbuilding Company.

=== Experimental submarines built by Simon Lake ===
Note – these submarines were not necessarily built at the Lake Torpedo Boat Company.

- Argonaut Junior (1894)
- Argonaut 1 (1897) – Built in Baltimore.
- Argonaut 2 (1900) – Reconstruction of Argonaut 1.
- Protector (1901) – Built in Bridgeport.
- Defender (1907)
- Explorer (1934) – built by the Forsberg Manufacturing Company in Bridgeport.
