= Philip Diehl (inventor) =

German-American mechanical engineer (1847–1913)

Philip H. Diehl
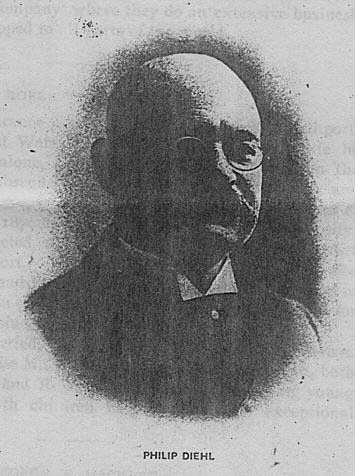
- Born: January 29, 1847; Dalsheim, German Confederation
- Died: April 7, 1913 (aged 66); Elizabeth, New Jersey, U.S.
- Occupations: Engineer, inventor
- Spouse: Emilie Loos (m. 1873)

Philip H. Diehl (January 29, 1847 – April 7, 1913) was a German-American mechanical engineer and inventor who held several U.S. patents, including electric incandescent lamps, electric motors for sewing machines and other uses, and ceiling fans. Diehl was a contemporary of Thomas Edison and his inventions caused Edison to reduce the price of his incandescent bulb.

He occasionally spelled his first name 'Phillip'.

In July 1868, he immigrated to New York City where he worked in several machine shops before finding work as an apprentice with the Singer Manufacturing Company. In 1870 or 1871 he was transferred to Chicago, Illinois, and worked at Remington Machine Company until 1875. He lost all of his possessions in the Great Chicago Fire of 1871. In 1873, Diehl married Emilie Loos in Chicago.

In 1875, Diehl moved to Elizabeth, New Jersey, and took charge of experimental work improving sewing machines at the Singer plant. His daughter, Clara Elvira, was born April 2, 1876.

== Inventions ==
While working at Singer in Elizabeth, Diehl experimented at work and at his home. This resulted in several inventions.

=== Electric light ===
Working in the basement of his home on Orchard Street in Elizabeth, New Jersey, Diehl invented a lamp that was different from Thomas Edison's incandescent electric lamp, which was patented in 1879. Diehl's lamp had no lead-in wires. In 1882 Diehl obtained the first patent on this induction incandescent lamp. The base of the lamp contained a wire coil that coupled with a primary coil in the lamp socket, causing current to flow through the lamp without the need for lead-in wires. Two additional patents were granted in 1883, followed by patents for electrical lighting systems in 1885 and 1886.

Following is a partial list of lamp or lighting related patents issued to Philip Diehl:

- U.S. No. 255,497, Incandescent Electric Lamp, March 28, 1882
- U.S. No. 272,125, Electric Incandescent Lamp, February 13, 1883
- U.S. No. 276,571, Incandescent Electric Lamp, May 1, 1883
- U.S. No. 314,567, Electric Arc Lamp, March 31, 1885
- U.S. No. 350,482, Electric Lighting System, October 12, 1886,

Diehl erected the city's first arc light in front of the Corey Building in Elizabeth, which still stands at 109 Broad Street.

Diehl's invention of the induction lamp was used by George Westinghouse to force royalty concessions from Thomas Edison. The Westinghouse Company bought Diehl's patent rights for $25,000. Although Diehl's lamp could not be made and sold at a price to compete with the Edison lamp, the Westinghouse Company used the Diehl bulb to force the holders of the Edison patent to charge a more reasonable rate for the use of the Edison patent rights.

=== Electric engines ===
Diehl's work at Singer to improve the sewing machine led to developments in electric motors, first to power sewing machines and later for other uses as well. In 1884 at the Franklin Institute in Philadelphia, Pennsylvania, he demonstrated a dynamo, modeled after his smaller motor, which generated a current for arc lamps, sewing machine motors and incandescent lamps, all covered by his patents. The judicial committee at the exhibition judged it to be one of the best dynamos exhibited.

=== Ceiling fan ===
The fan was invented in 1882 by Schuyler Skaats Wheeler. A few years later, Philip Diehl mounted a fan blade on a sewing machine motor and attached it to the ceiling, inventing the ceiling fan, which he applied for patent in August which was granted on November 12, 1889. Later, he added a light fixture to the ceiling fan. Later in 1904, Diehl and Co. added a split-ball joint, allowing it to be redirected; three years later, this developed into the first oscillating fan.

== Death ==
Philip Diehl died on April 7, 1913, in Elizabeth, New Jersey.

== Honors ==
In 1889 the American Institute of New York awarded Philip Diehl a bronze medal, which bears the inscription The Medal of Merit, awarded to Philip Diehl for Electric Fans and Dynamos, 1889.
