= Busch-Sulzer =

Busch-Sulzer Bros. Diesel Engine Company
- Industry: Diesel engines
- Founded: 1911, predecessors from 1898
- Founder: Adolphus Busch
- Fate: Dissolved late 1940s
- Key people: Adolphus Busch; Rudolph Diesel
- Products: Naval and commercial diesel engines

The Busch-Sulzer Bros. Diesel Engine Company was founded by Adolphus Busch of the Anheuser-Busch brewing company in 1911 as a joint venture with Sulzer Brothers of Switzerland. The company manufactured diesel engines until 1946.

In 1897, Adolphus Busch acquired rights to build diesel engines in the United States, with Rudolph Diesel as a consultant. The first companies resulting from this were the Diesel Motor Company (1898–1902) of New York City and the American Diesel Engine Company (1902–1911), which relocated to St. Louis, Missouri in 1908 and was succeeded by Busch-Sulzer. Although Busch acquired the rights to build Sulzer designs with the formation of Busch-Sulzer, the American joint venture preferred its own designs. The first submarines with Busch-Sulzer engines were the United States L-class submarines L-5 through L-8, designed by the Lake Torpedo Boat Company and launched 1916–17. Busch-Sulzer continued to produce engines for the US Navy and other customers through World War II, after which its assets were sold to the Nordberg Manufacturing Company of Milwaukee, Wisconsin.

Then-Lieutenant (and future Admiral) Chester W. Nimitz studied Diesel engines in Germany for the United States Navy in 1913. Busch-Sulzer tried to hire him, but he turned them down.
