= USS S-28 =

S-class submarine of the United States

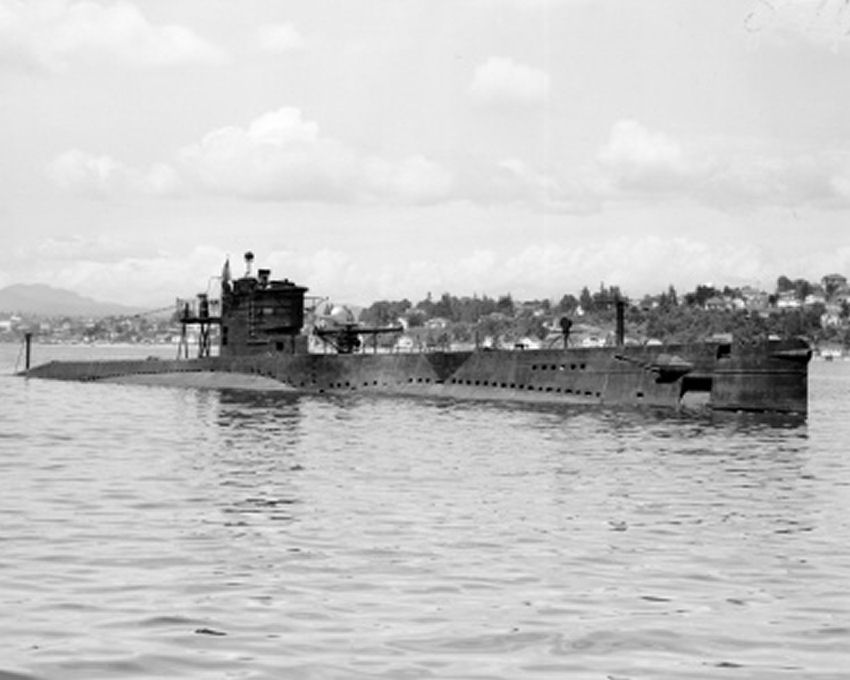
- USS S-28 (SS-133), at Puget Sound Navy Yard, Bremerton, Washington, on 24 June 1943, after a refit

History

United States
- Name: S-28
- Ordered: 4 March 1917
- Builder: Fore River Shipyard, Quincy, Massachusetts
- Cost: $677,622.76 (hull and machinery)
- Laid down: 16 April 1919
- Launched: 20 September 1922
- Sponsored by: Mrs. Katherine Monroe
- Commissioned: 13 December 1923
- Identification: Hull symbol: SS-133; Call sign: NINS
- Fate: Sank, 4 July 1944

General characteristics
- Class & type: S-18-class submarine
- Displacement: 930 long tons (945 t) surfaced; 1,094 long tons (1,112 t) submerged
- Length: 219 feet 3 inches (66.83 m)
- Beam: 20 ft 8 in (6.30 m)
- Draft: 17 ft 3 in (5.26 m)
- Installed power: 1,200 brake horsepower (895 kW) diesel; 2,375 hp (1,771 kW) electric
- Propulsion: 2 × NELSECO diesel engines; 2 × Ridgway Dynamo & Engine Company electric motors; 2 × 60-cell batteries; 2 × Propellers
- Speed: 14.5 knots (26.9 km/h; 16.7 mph) surfaced; 11 kn (20 km/h; 13 mph) submerged
- Range: 3,420 nmi (6,330 km; 3,940 mi) at 6.5 kn (12.0 km/h; 7.5 mph) surfaced; 8,950 nmi (16,580 km; 10,300 mi) at 9.5 kn (17.6 km/h; 10.9 mph) surfaced with fuel in main ballast tanks; 20 hours at 5 knots (9 km/h; 6 mph) submerged
- Test depth: 200 ft (61 m)
- Capacity: 41,921 US gallons (158,690 L; 34,907 imp gal) fuel oil
- Complement: 4 officers; 34 enlisted
- Armament: 4 × 21-inch (533 mm) torpedo tubes (12 torpedoes); 1 × 4-inch (102 mm)/50-caliber

Service record
- Operations: World War II
- Awards: 1 battle star

USS S-28 (SS-133) was an S-18-class submarine, also referred to as an S-1-class or "Holland"-type, of the United States Navy. She served in World War II, during which sank one Japanese ship. She was lost at sea, with all hands, in July 1944. Her wreck was discovered in 2017 at a depth of 8,500 ft (2,600 m) off the coast of Oahu.

== Design ==
The S-18-class had a length of 219 feet 3 inches (66.8 m) overall, a beam of 20 ft 8 in (6.3 m), and a mean draft of 17 ft 3 in (5.3 m). They displaced 930 long tons (940 t) on the surface and 1,094 long tons (1,112 t) submerged. All S-class submarines had a crew of 4 officers and 34 enlisted men, when first commissioned. They had a diving depth of 200 ft (61.0 m).

For surface running, the S-18-class were powered by two 600-brake-horsepower (447 kW) NELSECO diesel engines, each driving one propeller shaft. When submerged each propeller was driven by a 1,175-horsepower (876 kW) Ridgway Dynamo & Engine Company electric motor. They could reach 14.5 knots (26.9 km/h; 16.7 mph) on the surface and 11 kn (20 km/h; 13 mph) underwater.

The boats were armed with four 21-inch (533 mm) torpedo tubes in the bow. They carried eight reloads, for a total of twelve torpedoes. The S-18-class submarines were also armed with a single 4 in (100 mm)/50 caliber deck gun.

== Construction ==
S-28's keel was laid down on 16 April 1919, by the Bethlehem Shipbuilding Corporation's Fore River Shipyard, in Quincy, Massachusetts. She was launched on 20 September 1922, sponsored by Mrs. Katherine B. Monroe, and commissioned on 13 December 1923.

== Service history ==
=== 1924 ===
S-28 worked up in the waters off New England, in January and early February 1924. She stood out from New London, Connecticut, on 15 February, and proceeded down the Thames River in company with her sister ship S-23 en route to Naval Station, Guantánamo Bay, Cuba. While in the Caribbean, she called at St. Thomas, US Virgin Islands, Port of Spain, Trinidad, Culebra, Puerto Rico, and Coco Solo, Canal Zone. In addition to her numerous port visits, she fired her first three torpedoes during Battle Practice “A” held in Chiriqui Lagoon, on 15 April. She headed northward on 24 April.

Six days after she departed the Caribbean, S-28 moored alongside the submarine tender Savannah, outboard of S-24 and S-26, at 97th Street, New York City. On 10 May 1924, she got underway and stood down the Hudson River. She entered the Thames River, and moored on the north side of Pier C, New London, two days later. Assigned to Submarine Division (SubDiv) 11, she stood out to sea for short-range gunnery practice on 15–16 May, along with the rest of her division. While her crew scored five hits out of sixteen shots fired, her officers failed to score a single hit with their three shots. At the conclusion of gunnery practice, she returned to New London, and moored at Pier D.

S-28 remained in New England for the next several months. On 24 November 1924, she stood out of New London, in accordance with Commander, Cruiser Force Operation Order No. 21-24. Two days later on 26 November, she moored alongside the dock at the US Naval Academy, where she remained for the next five days. On 1 December, she continued her move southward, when she cast off from the Academy pier, en route to Naval Air Station, Pensacola, Florida, where she arrived a few days later.

=== Fleet Problem V ===
During the winter of 1924–1925, S-28 transited the Panama Canal, and participated in Fleet Problem V, from 23 February–12 March 1925. After the conclusion of the large-scale exercises, the submarine steamed to Pearl Harbor, Territory of Hawaii. While conducting local operations off Lahaina Roads, Maui, on 18 May, she stopped, and with 25 sailors on deck, began to trim down by the bow to examine her propellers. She suffered a loss of depth control and submerged to 90 ft (27 m). She quickly blew her main ballast tanks and surfaced three minutes later. There were no casualties.

=== 1925 ===
S-28 departed the Hawaiian Islands, en route to Portland, Oregon, on 1 June 1925. She anchored in Astoria, alongside S-24 and S-25. In addition to conducting multiple training exercises in the harbor and the Willamette River, on 14 June, she welcomed members of the public. She concluded her visit and stood out for San Francisco, California, on 21 June, and reached her destination on 23 June. Soon thereafter, she proceeded to Mare Island, and moored at the navy yard, alongside S-26. Shipfitters began the submarine's overhaul at approximately on 7 July, and she remained in yard hands for the next several months, eventually returning to San Diego, in early January 1926.

=== Fleet Problem VI ===
Assigned to the Submarine Detachment, "Blue Fleet", S-28 got underway for her participation in Fleet Problem VI, on 1 February 1926. En route to Balboa, CZ, four days later, the boat experienced a fire in the motor room bilge that forced her to come to a halt at 07:20, on 5 February. The blaze failed to cause any significant damage and the submarine resumed course at 07:42. She reached her assigned area and began the fleet problem at 06:00, on 11 February. Later the same evening, at 18:45, S-28 began maneuvering into position for a surface attack on an unknown number of the "Black Fleet" light cruisers, and simulated firing a four-torpedo spread at the warships ten minutes later. She would not detect the enemy fleet again until 13 February, the final day of the problem. At 05:25, on that day, she submerged and fired two practice torpedoes at some enemy cruisers. Less than three hours later, the submarine again sighted enemy cruisers off her port bow. Unable to dive because of a fully discharged battery, she changed course to 065°, at 08:10, and simulated firing four torpedoes.

Shortly after the simulated attack, S-28 proceeded ahead on course 105°T, at 08:23. At 10:03, she shut down both engines and proceeded on electric motors as she collected data on the pressure and drag introduced by a hole in her superstructure on the port side aft. She completed the data collection and steamed ahead on both engines at 10:14.

As she steamed to the east-northeast at 13:06, S-28 sighted a group of four "Black Fleet" cruisers and a destroyer off her port bow. As the latter vessel closed, the submarine dove at 13:24, and began maneuvering into a firing position. She came to course 045°, and fired four practice torpedoes at 13:33.

After the conclusion of the exercises at 22:00, on 13 February 1926, S-28 remained with the fleet and moored at Pier 18, in Balboa, on 15 February. While there, the submarine took on provisions, after which she resumed training. At 00:50, on 26 February, she landed a raiding party on Taboga Island, Panama, and the raiders rendezvoused with their boat in Taboga harbor, nearly eight hours later at 08:40. The apparently successful completion of the landing marked the end of S-28's training period with the fleet. After brief port visits to Balboa and Panama City, she exited the canal en route to San Diego, on 13 March.

=== 1926–1928 ===
On 10 May 1926, S-28 entered the marine railway, at the US Destroyer Base, San Diego. From 1200–1600, yard workers painted the underside of the boat's hull with one coat of anti-corrosive and one coat anti-fouling paint. She remained on the marine railway overnight to allow the paint to dry. She gradually reentered the water from 07:57–08:18, the next morning and cleared the marine railway under her own power a little over ten minutes later.

S-28 stood out of San Diego, on 11 June 1926, and set course for Mare Island. Guided by a harbor pilot and the district harbor tug Unadilla, she entered Berth B, at the Navy Yard, on 13 June. Two days later, she entered Dry Dock No. 2, for a brief, but extensive, overhaul. Over the next four days, yard workers removed and repaired her No. 3 periscope, replaced a section of hull plating located near her starboard side stern post, and replaced her 4 in (100 mm)/50 caliber gun. She exited dry dock, on 17 June.

After a brief port visit to San Francisco, the boat steamed northward in company with SubDiv 11, less S-25 and S-29, and made port visits in Astoria, Everett, Seattle, and Port Angeles. On 16 August, Commander SubDiv 11 broke his broad pennant on S-28. She stood out to sea in company with the Battle Fleet. The Secretary of the Navy, Curtis D. Wilbur, and Admiral Samuel S. Robison, Commander in Chief, U.S. Fleet, embarked in Savannah. Early on 21 August, she moored port side of Pier No. 29, in San Francisco. The submarine spent the remainder of the year conducting training and other local operations in the waters off California.

On 18 February 1927, S-28 got underway and proceeded from San Diego, to Mare Island Navy Yard, in accordance with ComSubDiv 11 Operations Order 2-27. Approximately three hours later, she entered Berth C-1, and began a lengthy maintenance and overhaul period. S-28 cast off from the Mare Island seawall, on 11 July 1927, a week shy of six months after her arrival. After a brief port visit to San Francisco, the submarine proceeded to Pearl Harbor, in company with the boats assigned to Submarine Divisions Eleven and Nineteen, the submarine tender Holland, and the ex-minesweeper, serving as a submarine tender, Ortolan, on 13 July. She remained in the Hawaiian Islands conducting training exercises until late August.

S-28 returned to San Diego, and moored alongside S-27, on 9 September 1927. She got underway again and steamed north up the coast of California, on 21 September. The submarine reached her destination and anchored in San Pedro, the next afternoon. The boat's port visit lasted less than a day. She got underway on 23 September, en route back to San Diego. During the remainder of the year, S-28 conducted additional training exercises off the coast of South Coronado Island, Mexico.

On 30 March 1928, S-28 got underway on course 318°T, in company with S-27. Several hours later, on 1 April, the boats submerged and conducted a training exercise until 05:35. Approximately 30 minutes later the submarines parted, and S-27 proceeded independently en route to Mare Island Navy Yard. A little over two weeks later, on 16 April, she entered Dry Dock No. 1, and began overhaul. With her overhaul complete she stood out for San Diego, in company with S-27, on 30 June. After a brief shakedown, S-28 moored at Broadway Pier, in San Diego, on 2 July. She remained in San Diego, conducting local operations, for the next three months.

On 1 October 1928, S-28 cast off from alongside Argonne, and stood out from San Diego Harbor, on a training cruise at 1055. Several hours later at 14:25, she began a series of battle practice drills. At 18:48, the submarine secured from her second torpedo battle practice of the day and anchored off South Coronado Island, in company with destroyers Reno and Stoddert, and S-27. She conducted three additional practice runs the next day. The submarine finally conducted a live fire torpedo practice at 09:48, on 3 October 1928. Unfortunately, the torpedo passed abeam of its intended target. After recovering the torpedo, S-28 returned to San Diego harbor, and moored port side to Argonne, at 1340.

S-28 stood out of San Diego, at 08:30, on 10 October 1928, en route to South Coronado Island. From 13:10–13:30, she conducted a torpedo firing exercise, scoring four hits. The submarine recovered all four “fish” at 14:26, and arrived at her destination approximately an hour and a half later. She conducted multiple sound tests over the next two days before returning to San Diego, and mooring port side to Holland, at 11:30, on 13 October. Two weeks later, on 29 October, S-28 got underway once again at 11:40, en route to the Mare Island Navy Yard, for repairs to her starboard main motor. She moored in the yard on 1 November. With the repairs completed, the submarine stood out of Mare Island, en route to San Diego, ten days later. She departed her homeport for exercises twice more that month and ended the year with tactical exercises in the Coronado Islands.

=== Fleet Problem IX ===
On 15 January 1929, Commander SubDiv 11 broke his broad pennant on board the submarine at 08:00. After refueling, she got underway and stood out of San Diego, en route to Magdalena Bay, Mexico, for Fleet Problem IX, which began just after midnight on 23 January 1929. Assigned to the "Black Fleet", Train Force, she was not assigned a specific task other than to arrive in the Gulf of Panama, six days later. She successfully completed this assignment, mooring in Berth "Roger" One, Panama Bay, just after 08:00, on 29 January. She stood out of the bay and proceeded to Balboa, the next morning, then remained in the Canal Zone for the next eight days.

Rather than immediately return to San Diego, after the conclusion of the problem, S-28 remained with the Battle Fleet as it continued to conduct training exercises in the waters off Panama. On 7 February 1929, she got underway at 03:56, leading SubDiv 11 in column, astern of SubDiv 19, out of Panama Bay. Several hours later at 09:20, she made visual contact with an "enemy" warship ten miles (16 km; 18,000 yd) distant. The submarine continued to shadow the vessel until she turned and steamed toward her at 10:30. She anchored in her patrol station, Bay of San Miguel, Panama, at 15:55, and commenced charging her batteries. Her batteries charged, she weighed anchor, set course 262°T, and began patrolling her assigned area at 02:05.

Several hours later at 09:37, S-28 detected a light cruiser, 15 mi (24 km; 26,000 yd) distant. Approximately a half hour later, she got underway on course 260°T, and began closing on the opposing vessel. She was unable to maneuver into an attack position and changed course to 350°T, for a rendezvous with the remainder of SubDiv 11, six miles (9.7 km; 11,000 yd) west of San Jose Light. The remainder of the submarine division joined her en route, S-24 at 13:55, S-29 at 15:05, S-25 and S-26 at 18:10. At 18:45, S-28 moored port side to Holland.

=== 1929–1941 ===
S-28 remained anchored in Balboa Harbor, until early on 11 February 1929. Commander, SubDiv 11 broke his broad pennant on board at 04:35, that morning, and the submarine got underway five minutes later. After she arrived on station in Panama Roads, at 09:40, the submarine submerged and conducted radiated susceptibility testing. Later that afternoon, she anchored near the Pearl Islands, at 13:58, and conducted submerged salvage experiments. After a night spent recharging her batteries, S-28 weighed anchor and proceeded to the waters off Pedro Gonzalez, Panama, in company with S-25, S-45, and the ex-minelayer, converted to a submarine rescue vessel, Ortolan, at 08:07, on 12 February. She laid to off the island at 08:45, and conducted salvage experiments for the next several hours.

The submarine remained anchored in the Pearl Islands, until she got underway on course 90°T, at 04:05, on 14 February 1929. At 06:55, she arrived on station for a fleet tactical exercise and began patrolling from 255°-45°T. Approximately an hour later, she set course 275°T, en route to intercept destroyers sighted by V-1 (later Barracuda). Just prior to 09:00, she sighted a cruiser and multiple destroyers off her port beam. She carefully maneuvered closer to her prey and submerged at 09:49. Shortly after the boat submerged, she abandoned her intended target in favor of bigger game. At 10:00, S-28 sighted the US Battle Fleet No. 1, in cruising formation, steaming at 12 kn (22 km/h; 14 mph) on course 10°T. She crept to within 2,000 yd (1,800 m; 6,000 ft) and fired four torpedoes at the battleships Wyoming, at 10:45, and Texas, four minutes later. Just after 11:00, she quickly submerged to avoid a collision with an unidentified destroyer, and then simulated firing another four-torpedo spread at California. She set course 135°T, and cleared the US battle line at 11:12. She moored in Balboa Harbor, alongside Holland, several hours later at 20:13.

S-28 remained in the waters off Balboa for the next thirteen days. On 26 February 1929, she got underway and set course for the Gulf of Nicoya, Costa Rica, where she arrived the next evening. The submarine successfully completed a simulated attack on Holland, and anchored in Puntarenas, Costa Rica. She subsequently made a port visit to La Union, El Salvador, before returning to her homeport at San Diego, eleven days later.

The boat remained in San Diego, conducting training exercises, until early May 1929. On 8 May, S-28 got underway from alongside Holland, at 08:15. Approximately four and a half hours later, she laid to transferred people to S-27, prior to setting course 135°T. She arrived on station off South Coronado Island, Mexico. The next morning, she got underway once again for exercises with the Battle Fleet. As she conducted a submerged patrol just past noon, a periscope sweep sighted a group of seven battleships escorted by three destroyers. She maneuvered to within 2,800 yd (2.6 km; 8,400 ft) before unleashing four practice torpedoes at an unknown number of New Mexico-class battleships. She remained undetected for the remainder of the afternoon. At the conclusion of tactical exercises with the Battle Fleet, S-28 set course for Mare Island. She moored at the yard outboard of S-27, on 13 May 1929, and remained in the yard undergoing maintenance for the next three months.

S-28 finally cast off from the Mare Island Navy Yard, on 13 August 1929, and returned to her homeport, in San Diego. She remained in port for just six days.

On 19 August 1929, S-28 stood out of the harbor, once again en route to the waters off South Coronado Island. She remained in the area conducting battle practice drills for the next three days, before returning to San Diego, and mooring alongside Argonne, on 23 August.

S-28 began the New Year conducting regular safety and attack drills in the waters off San Diego, from 5–23 January 1930. On 18 February, she entered the Marine Railway, at the Destroyer Base, San Diego, where she underwent a brief overhaul, during which several of her valves were replaced.

After another period of daily exercises, from 6–12 March 1930, S-28 stood out of San Diego, en route to Monterey, in company with SubDiv 11 and the submarine rescue vessel Ortolan, on 13 March. She anchored in Monterey Harbor, the next morning and remained there for the next four days. S-28 got underway on her second annual full power trial, at 10:24, on 17 March. As she steamed south, she sighted and passed the destroyer Hovey, and the minesweeper Tanager, towing ex-Farenholt, at 15:35. Early the next morning, she sighted and exchanged radio messages with the battleship Idaho, at 04:20. Several hours later, she anchored in San Pedro Harbor. While anchored, she successfully completed battery charge factor "SC", in the trial, at 23:45. S-28 resumed her voyage south at 01:31, and moored to Navy Pier, San Diego, at 10:00, on 19 March.

After she returned to her homeport, S-28 resumed a regular schedule of training dives and drills, from 27 March–14 April 1930. An anchor line fouled her port screw and stern plane during a mid-morning dive, on 15 April. She set course 340°, and stood toward the calmer waters of San Diego Harbor, which she entered at 12:45. Approximately a half hour later, she anchored off La Playa. At 13:20, S-28 trimmed down forward and flooded her No. 1 ballast tank and torpedo tubes, in an unsuccessful effort to clear the fouled screw. She got underway again at 14:18, and anchored alongside Holland at 15:15. A diver attached to the tender removed the obstruction and inspected her port screw from 16:00–18:20.

On 1 July 1930, S-28 returned to the Hawaiian Islands, in company with Holland, S-25, S-26, and S-29, from SubDiv 11, as well as the boats assigned to SubDiv 19, less S-42 and S-47. During the 11-day voyage, she participated in multiple gunnery training exercises and pointer drills. Finally, at 14:57 on 12 July, she anchored in Berth No. 57, Lahaina Roads.

On 13–14 July 1930, S-28 boresighted her deck gun and completed multiple short- and long-range practice attack runs. After the conclusion of these training exercises, she anchored alongside Holland, in Berth No. 36, and loaded six rounds of 4-inch/50 caliber ammunition. Just after 09:00 the next morning, Commander William R. Munroe, Commander, SubDiv 11, whose wife had christened the boat eight years before, boarded the submarine along with multiple unidentified umpires. At 09:20, S-28 got underway on course 310°T, en route to an experimental gunnery range. She conducted a short-range gunnery exercise from 09:50–09:54. The submarine repeated the same drill again on 17–18 July.

Three days after completing experimental gunnery exercises, on 21 July 1930, S-28 conducted her first submerged Long-Range Battle Practice (LRBP) rehearsal run from 06:30–06:43. Approximately four hours later, she conducted a second rehearsal run. Rather than conduct a third practice run, the submarine boresighted her gun during the early afternoon.

Just after 04:00 the next morning, S-28 got underway on course 172°T, for "day spotting practice". She submerged at 06:43, and completed both the spotting practice and her "official" LRBP rehearsal. From 12:50–13:52, she boresighted her gun at 5,000 yd (4,600 m; 15,000 ft). Late that evening, she anchored alongside Holland and loaded 16 rounds of 4-inch/50 caliber ammunition.

On 23 July 1930, S-28 stood out of Berth No. 37, at 05:07. She submerged on course 184°T, at 06:26. Ten minutes later, the submarine quickly surfaced and fired multiple rounds from her gun from 06:37–06:41. The boat submerged a minute later and fired four water "slugs" to complete the LRBP. After a full power run, she returned to Pearl Harbor, at 10:05, on 25 July. The boat remained moored for nearly three weeks.

In accordance with ComSubDiv Eleven dispatch 0113-1025, S-28 ended her brief period of inactivity and stood out to sea en route to San Diego, in company with S-25, S-26, S-27, and S-29, at 13:20, on 13 August 1930. Holland joined the group and took S-25 in tow three days later, at approximately 08:00. S-28 finally reached her homeport, and moored to the north side of Navy Pier, on 24 August, at 19:53.

S-28 resumed training shortly after returning to the continental United States. The submarine conducted daylong exercises on 29 August and 2 September 1930, and returned to the Coronado Islands, on 17–18 and 22–23 September.

Less than 24-hours after S-28 returned to port, she stood out en route to Mare Island, on 24 September 1930. She moored at the submarine pier at the Navy Yard, alongside Holland, V-1, V-3 (later Bonita), V-6 (later Nautilus), Henderson, the destroyer tender Altair, the refrigerated stores ship Arctic, and the cargo ship Sirius two days later. Shortly thereafter, the harbor tug Tillamook maneuvered the open lighter YC-312 into place alongside the boat's starboard side. The submarine's overhaul began when three shipfitters' helpers boarded on 27 September.

After nearly a month, S-28 got underway again at 13:05, on 24 October 1930. With the aid of unidentified harbor tugs, the submarine shifted position and stood in to Dry Dock No. 1, at 13:40, whereupon workmen immediately boarded the boat and resumed her overhaul. While the details of the work performed on the boat are largely unknown, according to her deck log, at 19:20, on 24 November, the submarine's main battery was replaced with a 120-cell, type UL-49 “Ironclad” battery manufactured by Electric Storage Battery Company, of Philadelphia.

Yard workers flooded the dry dock at 08:20, on 6 December 1930. S-28 re-entered the water approximately an hour later and moored in Berth R-1, at 12:35. She was still not yet ready to return to the fleet and remained moored in Mare Island for the remainder of the year.

Assisted by the motor tug YMT-4, S-28 got underway at 08:39, on 12 January 1931. Led by a harbor pilot, the boat steamed down the Mare Island Strait, through the San Pablo and San Francisco bays. At 14:55, she secured to the dock at Point Richmond, outboard of the Richfield Oil Company, Barge No. 1. The boat took on 7,182 US gal (27,190 L; 5,980 imp gal) of diesel fuel and remained moored overnight. The submarine got underway again the next morning and proceeded out to sea for two days of training. She returned to Mare Island, and moored in Berth E-1, on 15 January.

S-28 departed the West Coast for Hawaii, in mid-February 1931. She arrived at Pearl Harbor, on 23 February 1931. While based at Pearl, she conducted multiple local operations, interspersed with upkeep and maintenance at the navy yard, a routine that she unfailingly maintained over the next five years.

A week into the New Year, 7 January 1936, S-28 getting underway on course 138°T, at 06:36, and proceeding to her assigned patrol area. She arrived on station and commenced circling to maintain her position at 07:50, diving approximately ten minutes later, quickly maneuvering into an attack position, and firing four water "slugs" at her target, the tug Keosanqua, at 08:32. She surfaced at 08:33, set course 075°T, and steamed to a second patrol area, designated "Q-3", where she arrived at 08:44. She dove and began a second practice attack on the fleet tug, approximately a half hour later. While on course 150°T, S-28 collided with S-26, at 09:37. As collision alarms sounded on board, the boat descended to 75 ft (23 m) before regaining depth control and surfacing at 09:42, the submarine quickly determining that she had suffered broken masts and heavy damage to her bridge in the mishap. Damage assessment concluded, she set course 341°T, and proceeded to Pearl Harbor, at 10:07, mooring port side to Ten Ten Dock, at the Navy Yard, at 11:40.

S-28 conducted short daily training, an annual multi-day war patrol, and participated in fleet training exercises over the next two years. In mid-1939, she was transferred back to San Diego, with her home yard at Mare Island, where she was based until after the US entered World War II, in the aftermath of the Japanese attack on Pearl Harbor, on 7 December 1941.

=== World War II ===
==== First war patrol ====
S-28 did not conduct her first war patrol until the spring of 1942, when she stood out of the Destroyer Base, San Diego, in company with her S-18, S-23, and S-27, at 08:29, on 20 May 1942. A little over an hour later, the submarines joined with their escort, the armed yacht Andradite. As the boats sailed southwest of the Farallon Islands, two days later, the destroyer Talbot, relieved Andradite as escort for the remainder of the voyage to the Puget Sound Area, in accordance with Commander, Western Sea Frontier Forces Operation Order No. 2-42.

At 13:30, on 25 May 1942, S-28 entered the Strait of Juan de Fuca, Washington. Just over six hours later, S-27 detached from the group and proceeded toward Puget Sound independently, while 'S-18, S-23, and S-28, entered and moored in Port Angeles. The three boats refueled and took on additional provisions overnight. They rejoined Talbot, and proceeded toward Dutch Harbor, Territory of Alaska, in accordance with Commander North Western Sea Frontier Movement Order No. 51-42, the next afternoon.

Four days later, the submarines orders changed once again. At 09:00, on 29 May 1942, S-28 received a message from Commander, Submarine Division 41 (ComSubDiv 41), which ordered each boat to proceed to her designated patrol area. As their assigned patrol areas were along their current track, the submarines remained in company and under escort by Talbot, for another two days.

As she proceeded northward, S-28 encountered foul weather beginning on 31 May 1942. As the weather continued to worsen, a fire broke out in her portside main motor at 11:48 the next morning. She quickly extinguished the flames and suffered only burned insulation and wiring. The submarine completed repairs and proceeded ahead. Late that evening at 22:00, she released Talbot and steamed toward her patrol area alone.

S-28 entered her patrol area north of Latitude 54°N, on 2 June 1942. Ordered to attack any enemy forces approaching Cold Bay, S-28 chose to patrol the area between Pankof Breaker and Petrof Point. Unfortunately, she did not detect any enemy vessels in this area over the next nine days.

On 11 June 1942, the submarine departed her patrol area en route to Dutch Harbor, to refuel and take on additional provisions. As she left her patrol area, a burned-out radio motor generator high voltage armature prevented her from notifying Navy officials. At 14:28, she sighted an aircraft approaching from bearing 325°T. Unable to identify the aircraft, she lit a recognition flare and dove. Five minutes later a single bomb, or depth charge, exploded astern of the boat at position 53°57′25″N 164°30′00″W. The explosion only damaged the face of her 100 ft. diving station depth gauge and rained down numerous paint chips on the heads of her crew.

After the conclusion of the attack, S-28 immediately began repairing her broken depth gauge. Nearly an hour later, she discovered that both of her diving station depth gauges had inadvertently been disabled during the repair and she had suffered a loss of depth control. According to the depth gauge in her torpedo room, she had inadvertently sunk to 250 ft (76 m) and subjected herself to a sea pressure of 105 psi (720 kPa). The boat quickly returned to periscope depth, an internal inspection revealed no damage to her hull. She surfaced for the night at 22:36.

Early the next morning, the submarine sighted and challenged what she believed to be a 1,200 long tons (1,219 t) destroyer bearing 320°T, five miles (8.0 km; 8,800 yd) distant. The potential target successfully answered the challenge and identified herself as the seaplane tender, ex-destroyer, Hulbert. After identifying herself, the US warship successfully notified Navy officials of the submarine's imminent arrival in port. S-28 moored to the northwest side of the Dutch Harbor dock, on 12 June 1942. Over the next several hours, she refueled, took on provisions and obtained new orders from ComSubDiv 41.

At 23:18, on 12 June 1942, S-28 got underway from Dutch Harbor, en route to her designated patrol area near Kiska Island. Three days later she crossed the 180° meridian. She later submerged and began patrolling approximately 50 mi (80 km) off an unidentified enemy air base. The increasingly foul weather she encountered the next morning forced her to surface and attempt to determine her position every two hours. The weather finally broke and allowed the boat to obtain her position on 17 June. She discovered she had inadvertently steamed into the patrol area covered by S-35, north of Segula Island. She immediately cleared the area en route to her own designated hunting ground.

In heavy seas, at 04:46, on 18 June 1942, the submarine finally reached her patrol area near Kiska Island. Several hours later at 11:44, she sighted an Imperial Japanese Navy Matsu-class destroyer, bearing 265°T, approximately 2,500 yd (2,300 m; 7,500 ft) distant. Approximately five minutes later, the enemy warship turned toward S-28, forcing her to rig for depth charges and change course. As the enemy warship sailed overhead, the submarine backed away and maneuvered into firing position. At 11:57, she fired her number 1 and 2 torpedo tubes, at only 600–800 yd (550–730 m; 1,800–2,400 ft). A little over two minutes later, her sonar detected the sound of a "pistol shot". She did not detect an explosion or sounds consistent with a ship breaking apart. Rather than attempt another attack, she cleared the area at 12:00.

At 19:05, on 22 June 1942, ComSubDiv 41 ordered S-28 to search north of Tanaga, Kanaga, and Adak Islands, for S-27, which had reportedly run aground three days earlier. Once again, amid increasingly foul weather, the submarine searched along the northwest coast of Tanaga Island, from 12:38–16:24, on 24 June. As she approached Adak, at 20:30, Commander, Task Group 8.5 notified her that the stricken S-27 had been located.

On 26 June 1942, S-28 received orders from ComSubDiv 41 directing her to return to Dutch Harbor. She ended her first war patrol moored port side of the fuel dock, NAS Dutch Harbor, two days later.

==== Second war patrol ====
S-28 stood out of Dutch Harbor, for her second war patrol, on 15 July 1942. She entered her patrol area three days later, on 18 July. During her first two days on station, she conducted multiple unsuccessful reconnaissance patrols of Semisopochnoi Island, Little Sitkin Island, Little Sitkin Pass, and Khwostof Pass. On 20 July, she departed the area en route to Sirius Point, in compliance with orders issued by CTG 8.5.

The submarine arrived at her assigned station on bearing 308°T, 85 mi (137 km) off Sirius Point, Kiska Island, and began patrolling on 21 July 1942. At 15:24, the next afternoon, she received orders to close on Kiska, and intercept enemy vessels attempting to escape the US bombardment of the island scheduled to commence at 19:00, that evening. She found the area barren of enemy targets.

Early on 28 July 1942, CTG 8.5 ordered the submarine to intercept a two-ship convoy sailing at position 52°56′N 176°39′E. Just over four hours later at 05:07, she detected and began approaching a target on bearing 180°T. She lost contact with this vessel at 05:24, as well as another potential enemy target on bearing 190°T, at 05:50. Unable to regain contact with either target, she returned to her patrol area off Kiska, at 21:45, on 30 July.

S-28 sighted what she believed to be her first enemy contact of the patrol at 10:45, on 31 July 1942. As she steamed through the Bering Sea, she sighted a periscope bearing 335°T, 400 yd (370 m; 1,200 ft) distant. Although she judged that the target was likely a Japanese submarine, S-28 chose to dive and break contact. Approximately four hours later, at 14:38, she sighted a surfaced enemy submarine 6 miles (9.7 km; 11,000 yd) distant on bearing 270°. Rather than engage the enemy in a surface battle, S-28 dove and commenced a submerged approach to the target. A subsequent periscope sweep revealed no sign of the enemy boat.

Unable to regain contact with the enemy boat the next day, S-28 steamed out of the area and uneventfully patrolled the Khwostof and Little Sitkin passes, from 2-5 August 1942. After yet another uneventful patrol off Kiska, from 6-8 August, she steamed into "Area Ratam", in accordance with CTG 8.5 "Zip Rock", the next day. Over the next five days, 10–15 August, the submarine patrolled near Hat Island and Ogalala passes, and conducted an additional reconnaissance patrol of Semisopochnoi Island. She departed the area in accordance with CTG 8.5 "Juneau", at 21:00 on 15 August. Three days later, she ended her third war patrol and moored in Dutch Harbor at 0923.

Immediately after the boat reached port, the ship's company began refitting her. While recharging her batteries, on 23 August 1942, S-28 burned out her starboard main motor brush rigging. Replacement equipment arrived from Mare Island, on 14 September, and were installed the next day.

==== Third war patrol ====
In accordance with CTG 8.5 operation order 15-42, S-28 stood out of Dutch Harbor, and began her third war patrol on 16 September 1942. The heavy seas and foul weather she encountered her first day on patrol tore the boat's chart desk away from its moorings, "severely hamper[ing] bridge watch", and damaged her no. 2 periscope hoist gear, which had frozen in an extended position. Rather than attempt to continue the patrol, she chose to retire northward to make repairs. At 05:49, the next morning, she submerged to do so. She surfaced nearly five hours later and made repairs to her bridge from 1030-1126, after which, the submarine resumed her scheduled patrol.

As S-28 steamed on the surface on 2 October 1942, her Officer of the Deck sighted an enemy submarine at position 51°48′0″N 177°07′30″E. After a lengthy search of the area failed to locate the potential target, it was assumed that the sighting may likely have been an orca whale, the submarine abandoned the hunt at 10:50.

At 15:50, on 4 October 1942, S-28 began a submerged patrol of Vega Bay. Less than an hour later at 16:44, she heard screws close aboard on bearing 195°T, and sighted a 130–150 ft (40–46 m) long patrol vessel approximately 100–200 yd (91–183 m; 300–600 ft) distant. The submarine immediately dove to 90 ft (27 m) and made for deeper water. The patrol craft did not launch depth charges as it sailed overhead. In the boat's attempt to steam out of the area slowly, she took on too much water. At 16:57, the submarine came to rest 215 ft (66 m) below the surface. A quick inspection determined that the boat had escaped damage, and she rose off the bottom and proceeded out of the area.

S-28 departed her patrol area en route to Dutch Harbor, on 6 October 1942. Four days later, she sighted and approached an unidentified vessel. As she prepared to attack, the torpedo in tube number 1 inadvertently fired. The errant ordnance merely exploded at the end of its run four minutes later. After several additional attempts to communicate with the unidentified ship, S-28 cleared the area. She ended her third war patrol moored to the fuel dock, Dutch Harbor.

After the completion of her third war patrol, S-28 sailed for San Diego, where she arrived on 23 October 1942. While on the west coast, she served as a training vessel for the West Coast Sound School, from 26 October–13 November, and underwent a refit from 14 November–9 December.

==== Fourth war patrol ====
S-28 stood out for Dutch Harbor, on her fourth war patrol on 9 December 1942. She arrived in the Aleutian Islands ten days later. Rather than immediately taking to sea in search of enemy vessels, she underwent a five-day refit and crew rest period, from 21–26 December, and awaited further orders.

S-28 got underway on 27 December 1942. She encountered heavy seas and foul weather almost immediately after clearing the harbor. Unable to locate potential targets, she conducted multiple training exercises until entering her designated patrol area on 4 January 1943.

Rather than abating, the weather conditions only worsened throughout the boat's first day in her area. As she cruised on the surface at 20:15, a large wave flooded her bridge and threw her port lookout from the port after corner of the boat to the forward starboard corner. The lookout only suffered a broken nose, one badly bruised leg and minor lacerations.

Early on 6 January 1943, S-28 sighted and steamed toward a light on the horizon bearing 190°T. Hoping that the light indicated the presence of a sampan fishing boat, her deck gun crew went out on deck during a heavy snowstorm. With extremely limited visibility, she unsuccessfully searched for the target until 05:10.

S-28 detected a new target and went to battle stations at 20:52, the next evening. Despite the inability to identify her prey, at 21:33, she fired her number 1–3 tubes at a range of 1,200 yd (1,100 m; 3,600 ft). All three torpedoes missed. The boat resumed tracking and unsuccessfully attempted to close on the target over the next couple of hours.

A little over 24-hours later at 23:56, on 8 January 1943, S-28 detected and began approaching a 4,000–5,000 long tons (4,064–5,080 t) two mast freighter bearing 240°T. She maneuvered into a favorable attack position and fired three torpedoes at 00:51. As they had throughout her patrol, the heavy seas worked against the submarine once again, pushing all three off track. Rather than pursue the target, she surfaced and uneventfully patrolled from Horomushiro, Japan, to Attu, until she departed the area en route to Dutch Harbor, on 13 January. She arrived in port and concluded her fourth war patrol a week later, then underwent a refit at Puget Sound Navy Yard, from 22 January–4 February.

==== Fifth war patrol ====
Two days later, she stood out of Dutch Harbor, and began her fifth war patrol, escorted out to sea by the coastal minesweeper Phoebe. She entered her patrol area on 10 February, and proceeded to Holtz Bay, Attu. She reached the bay and sighted a 3,000 long tons (3,048 t) Japanese freighter, at 13:25, the next afternoon. Convinced the enemy vessel would soon get underway, S-28 remained on station nearby for the next several hours. She found herself approximately one mi (1.6 km) out of position when the freighter got underway at 16:44, on 12 February. Only able to close to within 4,000 yd (3,700 m; 12,000 ft), she gave up the pursuit at 05:00, the next morning. In accordance with her operational orders, for the remainder of her patrol S-28 conducted reconnaissance of Attu, on 14-16 and 19-25 February, the Semichi Islands, on 16 February, and Buldir Island, on 20 February. She departed the area on 24 February, and moored alongside the submarine dock, Iliuliuk Harbor, four days later.

==== Sixth war patrol ====
S-28 departed Dutch Harbor, and began her sixth war patrol escorted by the PC-461-class submarine chaser PC-601 on 13 July 1943. Four days later, she moored alongside the oiler Cuyama, refueled, took on provisions, and made minor repairs. The submarine and her escort departed and proceeded toward her assigned patrol area on 18 July. She entered her assigned area and began patrolling off Kamchatka, Soviet Union, three days later.

The sea took a heavy toll on the boat during this patrol. Upon surfacing for the evening on 22 July 1943, she discovered the decking forward of her gun missing, as well as her towing pendant loose. She was able to lash the pendant back in place and resume patrolling off Kamchatka. Early on 25 July 1943, the Navy assigned S-28 a new patrol area, which she entered the next morning. Her patrol area changed once again five days later. Early on 1 August, she began patrolling off Paramushir, Soviet Union. After she once again found little significant enemy naval activity in the area, on 6 August, she began patrolling the coastal shipping lanes near Nishibanjo Suido, Soviet Union.

S-28 attempted her first attack of the patrol as she sailed in the northern Kuril Islands, the morning of 7 August 1943. At 07:42, the submarine sighted, and began tracking, an enemy cargo ship steaming at 10 kn (19 km/h; 12 mph) approximately 5,000 yd (4,600 m; 15,000 ft) south-southwest from her position at 50°24′N 156°36′E. Just as the boat maneuvered into a firing position ten minutes later, the enemy vessel "zigged" to port. She set up for a second attack at 07:59, only to watch her prey turn to port once again. Rather than make a third attempt, she abandoned the chase and set off in search of a new target.

S-28 detected, and began tracking, a new target approximately six hours later. At 14:58, she sighted the masts of an enemy freighter, at bearing 350°T, only eight miles (13 km) distant. Just after 15:00, a periscope sweep revealed the presence of rapidly approaching rocks, forcing the boat to change course to avoid running aground. Before she could maneuver into position for a second attack, "fog that dropped like a curtain", enveloped the freighter.

Despite the loss of another target, S-28 continued to find the waters of the northern Kurile Islands, a rich target environment. Just after midnight, on 8 August 1943, the submarine's radar displayed a large "pip", indicating the presence of a large cargo vessel approximately 6,300 yd (5,800 m; 18,900 ft) distant. She continued to track the target, which only appeared as a "dark blur", for another 18 minutes, until momentarily blinded by a large phosphorescent wave at 01:03. A minute later, her prey turned and steamed away at high speed.

S-28 departed her patrol area, en route to Massacre Bay, Attu, just after midnight, on 14 August 1943. She arrived in the bay and moored portside of Cuyama, at 21:28, two days later. The next day the ship's company began a refit of their boat, assisted by Submarine Base, Attu. The refit was completed, and she was declared ready for sea, on 8 September 1943.

==== Seventh war patrol ====
S-28 stood out of Massacre Bay, on her seventh war patrol, on 8 September 1943. Later that evening, she began a three-hour training period, during which she practiced both surfaced and submerged attacks, as well as "indoctrinational" depth charging. Despite the successful training period, she encountered the first major obstacle of the patrol a little over 24-hours later.

As she proceeded toward her patrol area, the submarine activated her SJ radar system at 22:15, on 9 September 1943. She quickly identified, and set about repairing, the system's malfunctioning range stop. As she was only two days out of port, she requested permission to return to Massacre Bay. Navy officials quickly denied the request and instructed the submarine to attempt to affect repairs on her radar at sea.

Because of her malfunctioning radar, and the likelihood of enemy air patrols, beginning at 13:58, on 11 September 1943, S-28 submerged prior to each day's patrol. In the midst of a rainsquall, she entered her patrol area at two days later. Entry into her assigned hunting ground coincided with the successful completion of repairs on her radar system.

S-28 made her first contact with an enemy vessel at 15:38, on 19 September 1943, when she sighted and began tracking a 4,000 long tons (4,064 t) freighter steaming at position 49°0′N 151°43′E. As she closed to within 1,500 yd (1,400 m; 4,500 ft) at 15:56, the submarine fired four torpedoes. All missed. Before she could maneuver into position for a second attack, she received the first of five depth charges, launched from 1602-1610.

As she continued her patrol across the Sea of Okhotsk, she sighted and began tracking the 1,368 long tons (1,390 t) No.2 Katsura Maru at 19:18. She maneuvered to within 1,200 yd (1,100 m; 3,600 ft) of her prey before firing four torpedoes, two of which struck the enemy cargo ship at 19:44. The ship immediately listed 30° to starboard and sank bow first two minutes later.

Two circumstances on 10 October 1943, forced S-28 to cut short her patrol. A little over two and a half hours after a sailor reported a possible case of appendicitis, another sailor severely injured his thumb and two fingers when he caught his hand in the gears of an air compressor. The extent of the injuries forced the to amputate the mangled digits.

S-28 rendezvoused with her escort, the minesweeper Motive, on 12 October 1943. The two vessels proceeded to Pyramid Cove, Attu, where the submarine moored the next morning. Her stay in the cove proved brief. To avoid an expected Japanese air raid, the submarine got underway for Dutch Harbor, in company with PC-603, on 14 October. She moored in the harbor, and ended her seventh war patrol, on 18 October.

==== Training and loss ====
S-28 remained in Dutch Harbor, until sailing for Pearl Harbor, in mid-November 1943. After arriving in the islands and undergoing an overhaul, she served as a training boat for the next seven months.

S-28 had finished a normal upkeep period on 12 June, and continued on her assigned duty of training enlisted personnel and engaging in sonar exercises with ships under control of Commander Destroyers, Pacific (ComDesPac).

On 3 July, S-28, in accordance with orders from ComDesPac, got underway from the Submarine Base, Pearl Harbor, to conduct a week's normal operations. During the day on 3 July, S-28 acted as a target for antisubmarine warfare vessels until about 17:00, local time. At that time she made two practice torpedo approaches on USCGC Reliance. On 4 July, S-28 again carried out sonar exercises as on the previous day, and at 17:30 again undertook a practice approach on Reliance.

At 17:30, S-28 dived about four miles (6.4 km) distant from Reliance. At about 18:05, Reliance made sound contact with S-28 at a range of 1,700 yd (1,600 m; 5,100 ft). The range decreased to about 1,500 yards and then steadily increased, as the bearing drifted aft. Although sound contact was temporarily lost by Reliance at 3,000 yd (2,700 m; 9,000 ft), she picked up the submarine again at 3,300 yd (3,000 m; 9,900 ft). At 18:20, with a range of 4,700 yd (4,300 m; 14,100 ft), Reliance permanently lost sound on S-28. At no time during the approach or the ensuing sound search were distress signals from S-28 seen or heard, nor was any sound heard which indicated an explosion in S-28.

When, by 18:30, S-28 had not surfaced or sent any signals, Reliance retraced her course and tried to establish communication with her. Although previous tests had shown that no difficulty would be experienced in exchanging messages by sound gear at ranges up to 2,000 yd (1,800 m; 6,000 ft), Reliance was unable to contact S-28. The Coast Guard vessel called in other vessels from Pearl Harbor at 20:00, and a thorough search of the area was instituted, lasting until the afternoon of 6 July 1944. A slick, which was unmistakably made by diesel oil, was the only sign of S-28.

The Court of Inquiry, which investigated the sinking, determined that S-28 sank shortly after 18:20, on 4 July 1944, in 21°20′N 158°23′W, in 1,400 fathoms (8,400 ft; 2,600 m) of water. Because of the depth of the water, salvage operations were impossible.

The Court recorded its opinion that S-28 lost depth control "from either a material casualty or an operating error of personnel, or both, and that depth control was never regained. The exact cause of the loss of S-28 cannot be determined." The Court found further, that, "the material condition of S-28 was as good or better than that of other ships of her class performing similar duty," and that, "the officers and crew on board S-28 at the time of her loss were competent to operate the ship submerged in the performance of her assigned duties." It was stated that the loss of S-28 was not caused by negligence or inefficiency of any person or persons.

== Discovery ==
Over 70 years later, in the early fall of 2017, a research team led by explorer Tim Taylor, located the wreck they believed to be S-28. After an extensive investigation by the Underwater Archaeology Branch of the Naval History and Heritage Command (NHHC), Rear admiral Samuel J. Cox, USN (Ret.), NHHC Director, confirmed the discovery of the lost submarine on 2 July 2019.

The wreck lies in 2 major pieces near each other on the ocean floor. The main portion of the midship and stern lies on its starboard side with visible implosion damage while the detached bow lies upside down.

Wreck location: 21°20′0″N 158°23′0″W

== Awards ==
- American Defense Service Medal
- Asiatic-Pacific Campaign Medal with one battle star
- World War II Victory Medal

== Bibliography ==
- "Table 21 - Ships on Navy List June 30, 1919". Congressional Serial Set. U.S. Government Printing Office. 1921.
- Friedman, Norman (1995). U.S. Submarines Through 1945: An Illustrated Design History. Annapolis, Maryland: Naval Institute Press. ISBN 1-55750-263-3.
- Priolo, Gary. "S-28 (SS-133)". Navsource.net.
- Martin, Christoper J. (16 April 2020). "S-28". Dictionary of American Naval Fighting Ships. Navy Department, Naval History and Heritage Command. This article incorporates text from this source, which is in the public domain.
- Hall, Anne Martin (1925). Ships of the United States navy and their sponsors, 1913-1923.
- "S-28 (SS 133)". Dictionary of American Naval Fighting Ships. Navy Department, Naval History and Heritage Command. 31 January 2017. This article incorporates text from this source, which is in the public domain.
- "USS S-28 (SS-133)". Lost52project.com.
