= SS-50 =

SS-50, SS 50 or SS50 may refer to:

- SS-50 Bus, a component of an early computer configuration
- USS L-10 (SS-50), a United States Navy submarine which saw service during World War I

and also:

- USS S-50 (SS-161), a United States Navy submarine which saw service during World War I
- Super Soaker, the first model of this recreational water gun was named the SS50
