= USS S-6 =

S-class submarine of the United States

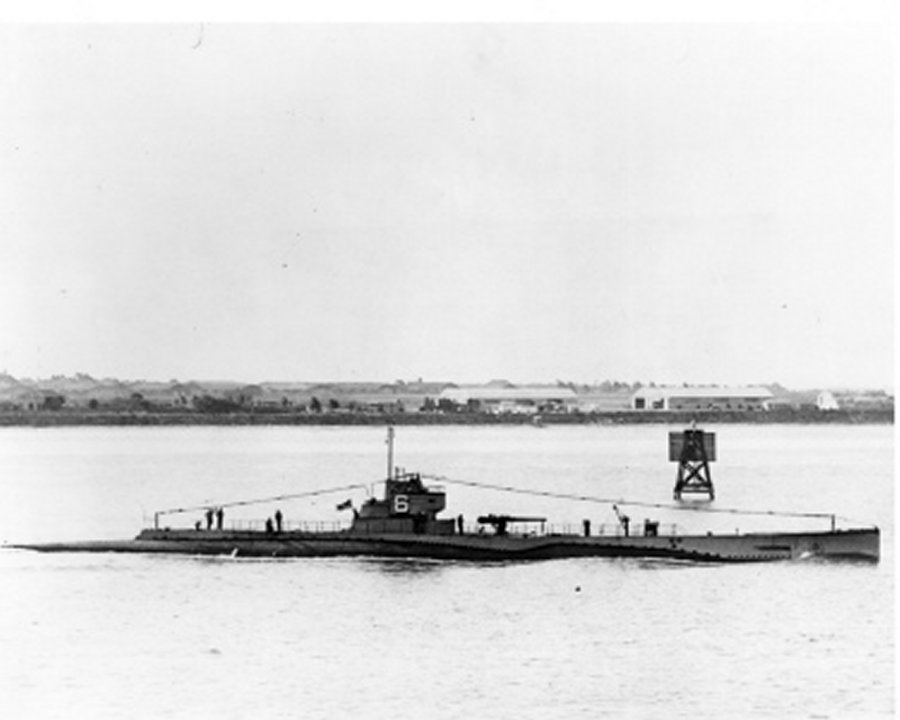
- USS S-6 (SS-111)

History

United States
- Name: S-6
- Builder: Portsmouth Navy Yard, on Seavey Island, Kittery, Maine
- Cost: $675,392.42 (hull and machinery)
- Laid down: 29 January 1918
- Launched: 23 December 1919
- Sponsored by: Miss Eleanor Westcott
- Commissioned: 17 May 1920
- Decommissioned: 10 April 1931
- Stricken: 25 January 1937
- Identification: Hull symbol: SS-111 (17 July 1920); Call sign: NIMN
- Fate: Sold for scrapping

General characteristics
- Class & type: S-3-class submarine
- Displacement: 875 long tons (889 t) surfaced; 1,088 long tons (1,105 t) submerged
- Length: 231 feet (70 m)
- Beam: 21 ft 10 in (6.65 m)
- Draft: 13 ft 1 in (3.99 m)
- Installed power: 1,400 brake horsepower (1,044 kW) diesel; 1,200 hp (895 kW) electric
- Propulsion: 2 × NELSECO diesel engines; 2 × Westinghouse Electric Corporation electric motors; 1 × 120-cell batteries; 2 × Propellers
- Speed: 15 knots (28 km/h; 17 mph) surfaced; 11 kn (20 km/h; 13 mph) submerged
- Test depth: 200 ft (61 m)
- Capacity: 36,950 US gallons (139,900 L; 30,770 imp gal) fuel
- Complement: 4 officers; 34 enlisted
- Armament: 4 × 21-inch (533 mm) torpedo tubes (12 torpedoes); 1 × 4-inch (102 mm)/50-caliber

USS S-6 (SS-111), also known as "Submarine No. 111", was an S-3-class, also referred to as a "Government"-type, submarine of the United States Navy.

== Design ==
The "Government"-type had a length of 231 feet (70.4 m) overall, a beam of 21 ft 10 in (6.7 m), and a mean draft of 13 ft 1 in (4.0 m). They displaced 875 long tons (889 t) on the surface and 1,088 long tons (1,105 t) submerged. All S-class submarines had a crew of 4 officers and 34 enlisted men, when first commissioned. They had a diving depth of 200 ft (61.0 m).

For surface running, the S-3-class were powered by two 700-brake-horsepower (522 kW) NELSECO diesel engines, each driving one propeller shaft. When submerged each propeller was driven by a 600-horsepower (447 kW) Westinghouse Electric Corporation electric motor. They could reach 15 knots (28 km/h; 17 mph) on the surface and 11 kn (20 km/h; 13 mph) underwater.

The boats were armed with four 21-inch (533 mm) torpedo tubes in the bow. They carried eight reloads, for a total of twelve torpedoes. The S-3-class submarines were also armed with a single 4 in (100 mm)/50 caliber deck gun.

== Construction ==
S-6's keel was laid down on 29 January 1918, by the Portsmouth Naval Shipyard, in Kittery, Maine. She was launched on 23 December 1919, sponsored by Miss Eleanor Westcott, and commissioned on 17 May 1920.

== Service history ==
When the US Navy adopted its hull classification system on 17 July 1920, she received the hull number SS-111.

Following trials and outfitting, S-6 departed New London, Connecticut, on 18 November 1920, and joined other S-boats of Submarine Divisions 12 and 18 (SubDivs 12 and 18), for what was to be, at that time, the longest cruise for American submarines on record. The trip, begun with a rendezvous off Portsmouth, New Hampshire, took them through the Panama Canal, to Pearl Harbor, and then to Cavite, Luzon, Philippine Islands. Submarines which had previously served in the Asiatic Fleet, the Plunger-class, had been carried over tied to the decks of colliers.

The two submarine divisions operated from Cavite, over the next three years, from 1 December 1921–29 October 1924. During that time, they frequently visited the Chinese ports at Shanghai, Yantai, Qinhuangdao, Qingdao, Amoy, and Wusong.

On 30 December, S-6 and SubDiv 12, arrived at the Mare Island Navy Yard, California. They operated along the West Coast until 15 February 1927; in the Panama Canal area in March–April; then returned to New London, on 3 May, to operate along the New England coast. On 17 December, S-4, another S-boat of SubDiv 12, foundered after colliding with the Coast Guard destroyer Paulding, off Provincetown, Massachusetts. S-6 then served as a training model to familiarize divers preparing to raise the sunken sub. S-4 was raised on 17 March 1928, and S-6 resumed normal operations with her division.

== Fate ==
She conducted winter maneuvers in the Panama Canal area in 1929–1930, but primarily operated out of New London, until decommissioned on 10 April 1931, at the Philadelphia Navy Yard. She was struck from the Naval Vessel Register on 25 January 1937.

== Bibliography ==
- "Table 21 - Ships on Navy List June 30, 1919". Congressional Serial Set. U.S. Government Printing Office: 770. 1921.
- Friedman, Norman (1995). U.S. Submarines Through 1945: An Illustrated Design History. Annapolis, Maryland: Naval Institute Press. ISBN 1-55750-263-3.
- Priolo, Gary. "S-6 (SS-111)". Navsource.net.
- Hall, Anne Martin (1925). Ships of the United States navy and their sponsors, 1913-1923.
- "S-6". Dictionary of American Naval Fighting Ships. Navy Department, Naval History and Heritage Command. 1 September 2015. This article incorporates text from this source, which is in the public domain.
