= USS S-45 =

Submarine of the United States

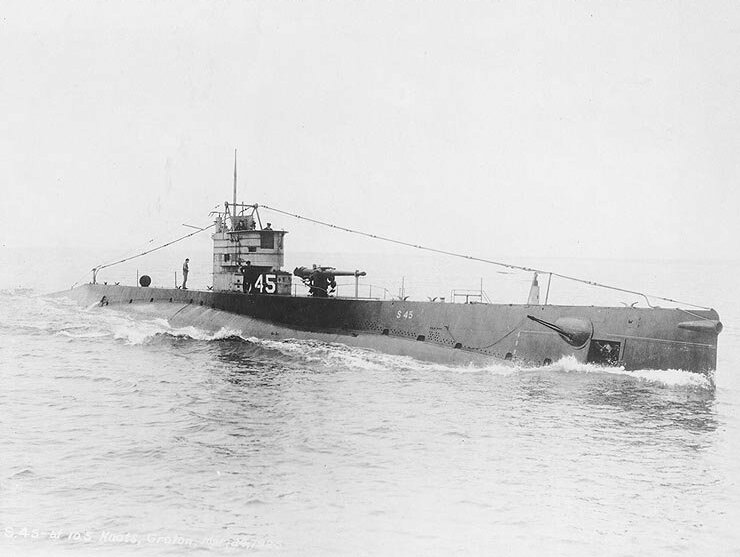
- USS S-45 making 10.5 knots on sea trials off Groton, Connecticut, on 24 March 1925.

History

United States
- Name: USS S-45
- Builder: Bethlehem Shipbuilding Corporation, Quincy, Massachusetts
- Laid down: 29 December 1920
- Launched: 26 June 1923
- Sponsored by: Mrs. Charles Hibbard
- Commissioned: 31 March 1925
- Decommissioned: 30 October 1945
- Stricken: 13 November 1945
- Fate: Sold for scrapping December 1946

General characteristics
- Class & type: S-class submarine
- Displacement: 850 long tons (864 t) surfaced; 1,126 long tons (1,144 t) submerged
- Length: 225 ft 3 in (68.66 m)
- Beam: 20 ft 8 in (6.30 m)
- Draft: 16 ft (4.9 m)
- Speed: 14.5 knots (16.7 mph; 26.9 km/h) surfaced; 11 knots (13 mph; 20 km/h) submerged
- Complement: 42 officers and men
- Armament: 1 × 4 in (102 mm)/50 deck gun; 4 × 21 inch (533 mm) torpedo tubes

Service record
- Operations: World War II

USS S-45 (SS-156) was a third-group (S-42) S-class submarine of the United States Navy.

== Construction and commissioning ==
S-45′s keel was laid down on 29 December 1920 by the Bethlehem Shipbuilding Corporation's Fore River Shipyard in Quincy, Massachusetts. She was launched on 26 June 1923, sponsored by Mrs. Charles Hibbard, and delivered and commissioned on 31 March 1925.

== Service history ==
Completing shakedown exercises off the southern New England coast, S-45 departed New London, Connecticut, on 9 June 1925. Nineteen days later, she joined Submarine Division (SubDiv) 19 at Coco Solo, Canal Zone, and commenced type exercises and joint United States Army-United States Navy maneuvers in the Panama Canal area. During the next two years, only Fleet Problems VI and VII took her out of her normal operating area. In May 1927, the S-boat moved northwest to Mare Island for overhaul, then began operations out of San Diego, California.

The following spring, S-45 participated in Fleet Problem VIII, a convoy and antisubmarine search and contact problem conducted en route between San Francisco, California, and Honolulu, Hawaii. During the winter of 1929, she returned to the Panama Canal Zone for Fleet Problem IX.

In December 1930, S-45 was transferred a third time; and, on 12 December, she arrived at her new home port, Pearl Harbor, whence she operated, with SubDiv 11, on a schedule of exercises and fleet problems similar to those followed previously for the next year and one half. In September 1932, she joined Rotating Reserve Division 14 and, for the next several years alternated active service with Division 11 and reserve status in Division 14.

In March 1936, the boats of SubDiv 11 were ordered back to Panama. They participated in Fleet Problem XVII en route and arrived at Coco Solo, their new home port, on 22 May. For the next four years, they maintained a schedule similar to previous tours in the Canal Zone.

With the new decade, 1940, and the expansion of hostilities in Europe and Asia, the schedule was varied. Exercises and patrols in the vital canal area were stepped up, and plans were made to overhaul and modernize the old S-boats. On 15 May 1941, S-45 got underway for Philadelphia, Pennsylvania. There, she received new equipment, exclusive of air-conditioning, and a complete overhaul. By August, she was off the New England coast for simulated war patrol exercises, and, in October, she moved south to Bermuda for patrol and antisubmarine warfare training duties.

=== World War II ===
==== First two defensive patrols ====
After the 7 December attack on Pearl Harbor, S-45 returned to Panama and assumed patrol duties in the approaches to the canal. By 1 February 1942, she had conducted two defensive patrols, during which her crew became even better acquainted with the defects in the torpedoes she carried and with the limited wartime capabilities of boats of her class.

Then, as the Japanese thrust toward Australia continued, the Panama S-boats prepared to assist in defensive efforts in the southwestern Pacific. In March, S-45 and her division, now SubDiv 53, headed west. In mid-April, they arrived at Brisbane, Queensland; and, on 12 May, S-45 departed Moreton Bay on her first offensive war patrol.

==== First war patrol ====
Assigned to the Bougainville-Buka-New Ireland area, she remained on patrol into mid-June, unable to score against Japanese shipping and unable to contact an agent on Cape Sena. On 19 June, she returned to Brisbane, where an overhaul brought the installation of temporary air conditioning and corrected some of the defects in the engines, the radio transmitter, and the bow planes which had hampered her during her recent patrol. On 26 August, she headed back to the Solomon Islands. By the end of the month, she was on station in the Shortland Island area. Numerous targets were sighted; but, due to frequent squalls and her own limitations, she was unable to press home an attack.

==== Second war patrol ====
On 5 September, she was ordered to the Trobriand Islands to intercept enemy shipping bound for Milne Bay, but her luck was no better there.

On 12 September, S-45 sighted, closed, and attempted to fire a bow shot at a cruiser. As the outer doors were opened, she became heavy forward, and depth control was lost. Periscope depth was soon regained but could not be held. The sound operators lost the target in S-45’s own noises; and, by the time control was regained, the target had passed firing bearing. The submarine swung to a new track to pursue. Depth control was again lost. Another battle for control of the boat was won but too late for S-45 to score.

==== Third war patrol ====
S-45 returned to Moreton Bay on 23 September. By 27 October, she was back in the Shortland Island area and, on 2 November, her presence near Fauro Island was detected by the enemy. Explosions were heard, but none was close. The next morning, prior to daylight, she was sighted by a destroyer as she was preparing for a surface shot.

The destroyer swung left to ram; S-45 swung right, submerged, and rigged for depth charging. Within minutes, the explosions, close aboard portside, were felt. Varying her depth and course, the S-boat reached 200 feet (61 m). Her evasive maneuvering was successful, and she retired south. The destroyer continued to circle on the surface near the initial contact point. By daylight, a second destroyer had joined the first; and, for the next three hours, the two surface ships were heard, alternately close, then fading out. After 09:30, no further pinging was heard. Little damage had been done, but pressure in the boat was high, a result of blowing and venting tanks. The high pressure, in turn, caused the depth gauge to register low.

By 4 November, poor weather had set in; and, on 6 November, the boat cleared the area, setting course for Suva and the Panama Canal. Arriving at the latter on 6 January 1943, she underwent voyage repairs, then received orders to Saint Thomas, United States Virgin Islands, for training duty. On arrival, she was ordered back to Coco Solo, whence she continued on to San Diego and a three-month tour with the West Coast Sound School. Overhaul followed, and on 19 November, she got underway for the Aleutian Islands.

==== Fourth war patrol ====
S-45 arrived at Dutch Harbor on 2 December 1943. Training and minor repairs occupied the remainder of the month; and, on 31 December, she departed the eastern Aleutians for Attu. There, she topped off and continued on to the Kuril Islands, encountering strong winds and heavy seas as she moved west. On 12 January 1944, she lost her antennae in a storm and, on 13 January, she arrived in her patrol area, the Ominato-Paramushiro convoy routes.

Hunting was again poor; and, on 28 January, she returned to Attu. Two days later, while charging batteries, she suffered an explosion in the after battery compartment. By 10 February, the debris had been removed and temporary repairs had been made. The next day, she moved east, arriving at Dutch Harbor on 14 February. From there, she returned to San Diego, completed repairs, then got underway, in June, to cross the Pacific. From mid-July to the end of the year, she conducted training exercises from Manus in the Admiralty Islands; then moved to Brisbane for repairs preparatory to returning to California.

==== Retirement ====
S-45 arrived back at San Diego in early April 1945 and resumed operations for the West Coast Sound School. In September, after the formal end of World War II, she moved up to San Francisco where she was decommissioned on 30 October 1945. Her name was struck from the Naval Vessel Register on 13 November 1945; and in December 1946, her hulk was sold for scrapping to the Salco Iron and Metal Company of San Francisco.

== Awards ==
- American Defense Service Medal
- American Campaign Medal
- Asiatic-Pacific Campaign Medal
- World War II Victory Medal
