= USS S-7 =

S-class submarine of the United States

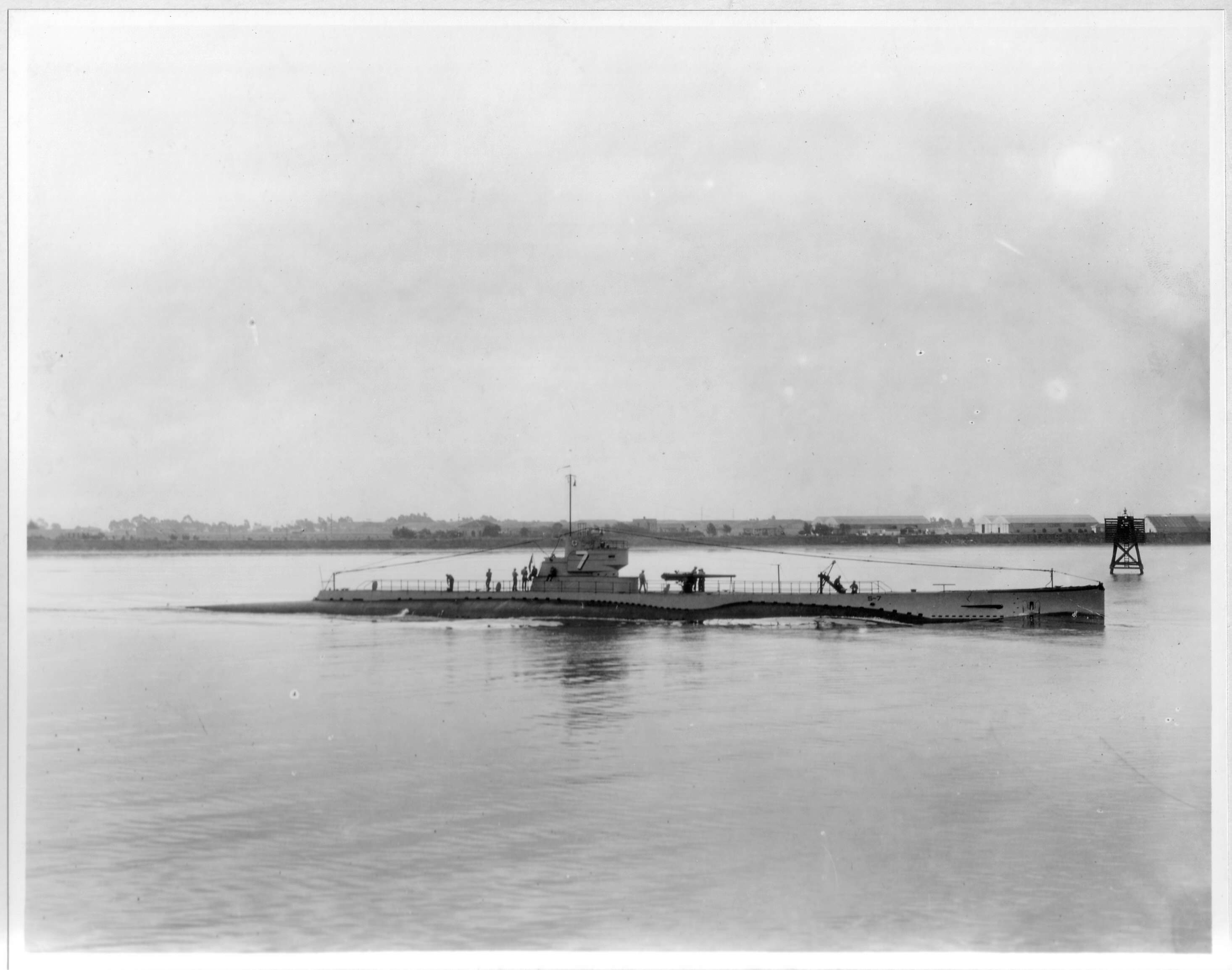
- USS S-7 (SS-112)

History

United States
- Name: S-7
- Builder: Portsmouth Navy Yard, on Seavey Island, Kittery, Maine
- Cost: $675,701.15 (hull and machinery)
- Laid down: 29 January 1918
- Launched: 5 February 1920
- Sponsored by: Mrs. Margaret Wyman
- Commissioned: 1 July 1920
- Decommissioned: 3 April 1931
- Stricken: 25 January 1937
- Identification: Hull symbol: SS-112 (17 July 1920); Call sign: NIMP
- Fate: Sold for scrapping

General characteristics
- Class & type: S-3-class submarine
- Displacement: 875 long tons (889 t) surfaced; 1,088 long tons (1,105 t) submerged
- Length: 231 feet (70 m)
- Beam: 21 ft 10 in (6.65 m)
- Draft: 13 ft 1 in (3.99 m)
- Installed power: 1,400 brake horsepower (1,044 kW) diesel; 1,200 hp (895 kW) electric
- Propulsion: 2 × NELSECO diesel engines; 2 × Westinghouse Electric Corporation electric motors; 1 × 120-cell batteries; 2 × Propellers
- Speed: 15 knots (28 km/h; 17 mph) surfaced; 11 kn (20 km/h; 13 mph) submerged
- Test depth: 200 ft (61 m)
- Capacity: 36,950 US gallons (139,900 L; 30,770 imp gal) fuel
- Complement: 4 officers; 34 enlisted
- Armament: 4 × 21-inch (533 mm) torpedo tubes (12 torpedoes); 1 × 4-inch (102 mm)/50-caliber

USS S-7 (SS-112), also known as "Submarine No. 112", was an S-3-class, also referred to as a "Government"-type, submarine of the United States Navy.

== Design ==
The "Government"-type had a length of 231 feet (70.4 m) overall, a beam of 21 ft 10 in (6.7 m), and a mean draft of 13 ft 1 in (4.0 m). They displaced 875 long tons (889 t) on the surface and 1,088 long tons (1,105 t) submerged. All S-class submarines had a crew of 4 officers and 34 enlisted men, when first commissioned. They had a diving depth of 200 ft (61.0 m).

For surface running, the S-3-class were powered by two 700-brake-horsepower (522 kW) NELSECO diesel engines, each driving one propeller shaft. When submerged each propeller was driven by a 600-horsepower (447 kW) Westinghouse Electric Corporation electric motor. They could reach 15 knots (28 km/h; 17 mph) on the surface and 11 kn (20 km/h; 13 mph) underwater.

The boats were armed with four 21-inch (533 mm) torpedo tubes in the bow. They carried eight reloads, for a total of twelve torpedoes. The S-3-class submarines were also armed with a single 4 in (100 mm)/50 caliber deck gun.

== Construction ==
S-7's keel was laid down on 29 January 1918, by the Portsmouth Naval Shipyard, in Kittery, Maine. She was launched on 5 February 1920, sponsored by Mrs. Margaret Wyman, and commissioned on 1 July 1920.

== Service history ==
When the US Navy adopted its hull classification system on 17 July 1920, she received the hull number SS-111.

S-7 sailed from New London, Connecticut, on 18 November 1920, to rendezvous with S-boats of Submarine Division 18 (SubDiv 18), and her own division, SubDiv 12, off Portsmouth, New Hampshire. They proceeded via the Panama Canal to Hawaii, arriving at Pearl Harbor, on 15 April 1921. Departing Pearl Harbor, on 3 November, they reached Cavite, Luzon, Philippine Islands, on 1 December. This was the longest cruise on record, at that time, for American submarines.

S-7 remained in the Philippines, over the next three years, except for annual spring visits to Shanghai, Yantai, Qinhuangdao, Amoy, Qingdao, and Wusong, Chinese. She finally departed Cavite, on 29 October 1924, for the Mare Island Navy Yard, California, arriving there on 30 December.

S-7 remained at Mare Island, through 1925, and operated along the West Coast in 1926, mainly at San Francisco, San Pedro Submarine Base-San Pedro, and San Diego, California. Sailing from San Francisco, on 17 February 1927, she operated in the Panama Canal area from March–April, arrived at New London on 3 May, and spent the rest of the year operating along the New England coast. S-7 served in the Panama Canal area from February–April 1928, from January–April 1929, and from January–March 1930, with the remainder of those years in the northeast.

== Fate ==
Departing New London on 22 October, S-7 was decommissioned at the Philadelphia Navy Yard, on 3 April 1931, and was struck from the Naval Vessel Register on 25 January 1937.

== Bibliography ==
- "Table 21 - Ships on Navy List June 30, 1919". Congressional Serial Set. U.S. Government Printing Office: 770. 1921.
- Friedman, Norman (1995). U.S. Submarines Through 1945: An Illustrated Design History. Annapolis, Maryland: Naval Institute Press. ISBN 1-55750-263-3.
- Priolo, Gary. "S-7 (SS-112)". Navsource.net.
- Hall, Anne Martin (1925). Ships of the United States navy and their sponsors, 1913-1923.
- "S-7". Dictionary of American Naval Fighting Ships. Navy Department, Naval History and Heritage Command. 1 September 2015. This article incorporates text from this source, which is in the public domain.
