= USS S-22 =

S-class submarine of the United States

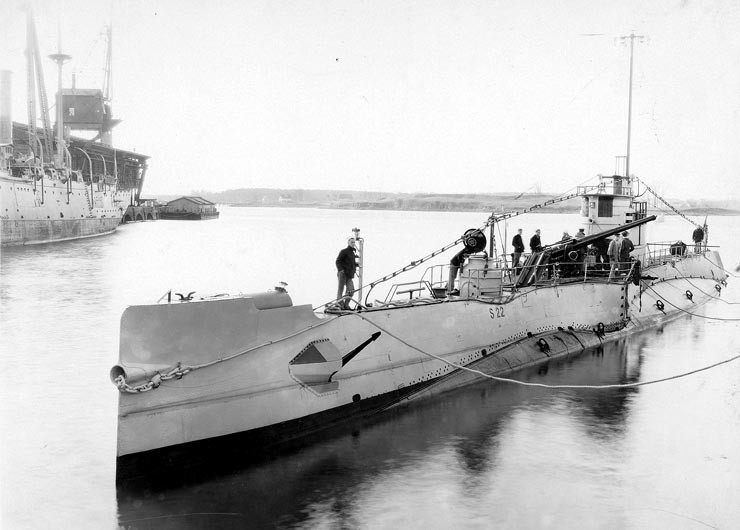
- USS S-22 at Portsmouth Navy Yard, 21 November 1929

History

United States
- Name: S-22
- Builder: Fore River Shipyard, Quincy, Massachusetts
- Cost: $677,622.75 (hull and machinery)
- Laid down: 6 January 1919
- Launched: 15 July 1920
- Sponsored by: Mrs. Nannie Bowman
- Commissioned: 23 June 1924
- Decommissioned: 19 June 1942
- Stricken: August 1945
- Identification: Hull symbol: SS-127; Call sign: NINL
- Fate: Transferred to United Kingdom, 19 September 1942

United Kingdom
- Name: P.554
- Acquired: 19 September 1942
- Fate: Returned to the US Navy, 11 July 1944; Sold for scrapping, 16 November 1945

General characteristics
- Class & type: S-18-class submarine
- Displacement: 930 long tons (945 t) surfaced; 1,094 long tons (1,112 t) submerged
- Length: 219 feet 3 inches (66.83 m)
- Beam: 20 ft 8 in (6.30 m)
- Draft: 17 ft 3 in (5.26 m)
- Installed power: 1,200 brake horsepower (895 kW) diesel; 2,375 hp (1,771 kW) electric
- Propulsion: 2 × NELSECO diesel engines; 2 × Ridgway Dynamo & Engine Company electric motors; 2 × 60-cell batteries; 2 × Propellers
- Speed: 14.5 knots (26.9 km/h; 16.7 mph) surfaced; 11 kn (20 km/h; 13 mph) submerged
- Range: 3,420 nmi (6,330 km; 3,940 mi) at 6.5 kn (12.0 km/h; 7.5 mph) surfaced; 8,950 nmi (16,580 km; 10,300 mi) at 9.5 kn (17.6 km/h; 10.9 mph) surfaced with fuel in main ballast tanks; 20 hours at 5 knots (9 km/h; 6 mph) submerged
- Test depth: 200 ft (61 m)
- Capacity: 41,921 US gallons (158,690 L; 34,907 imp gal) fuel oil
- Complement: 4 officers; 34 enlisted
- Armament: 4 × 21-inch (533 mm) torpedo tubes (12 torpedoes); 1 × 4-inch (102 mm)/50-caliber

USS S-22 (SS-127) was an S-18-class submarine, also referred to as an S-1-class or "Holland"-type, of the United States Navy, in commission from 1924 to 1942. Prior to World War II, she operated in the Atlantic Ocean, Caribbean Sea, and Pacific Ocean, and after the United States entered the war, she operated off Panama. She was transferred to the Royal Navy as P.554 from 1942 to 1944.

== Design ==
The S-18-class had a length of 219 feet 3 inches (66.8 m) overall, a beam of 20 ft 8 in (6.3 m), and a mean draft of 17 ft 3 in (5.3 m). They displaced 930 long tons (940 t) on the surface and 1,094 long tons (1,112 t) submerged. All S-class submarines had a crew of 4 officers and 34 enlisted men, when first commissioned. They had a diving depth of 200 ft (61.0 m).

For surface running, the S-18-class were powered by two 600-brake-horsepower (447 kW) NELSECO diesel engines, each driving one propeller shaft. When submerged each propeller was driven by a 1,175-horsepower (876 kW) Ridgway Dynamo & Engine Company electric motor. They could reach 14.5 knots (26.9 km/h; 16.7 mph) on the surface and 11 kn (20 km/h; 13 mph) underwater.

The boats were armed with four 21-inch (533 mm) torpedo tubes in the bow. They carried eight reloads, for a total of twelve torpedoes. The S-18-class submarines were also armed with a single 4 in (100 mm)/50 caliber deck gun.

== Construction ==
S-22's keel was laid down on 6 January 1919, by the Bethlehem Shipbuilding Corporation's Fore River Shipyard, in Quincy, Massachusetts. She was launched on 15 July 1920, sponsored by Mrs. Nannie Bowman, and commissioned on 23 June 1924.

== Service history ==
=== 1924–1942 ===
In addition to duty off the Northeastern Coast of the United States, from New London, Connecticut, from 1924 through 1930, S-22 visited the Territory of Hawaii from 27 April to 25 May 1925. She operated in the Panama Canal Zone area, from February through April 1926, and visited Kingston, Jamaica, from 20 to 28 March 1927. She served again in the Panama Canal area, in the late winter and early spring of 1928, 1929, and 1930.

Departing New London, on 5 January 1931, S-22 cruised via the Panama Canal, and California, to Hawaii, arriving at Pearl Harbor, on 25 April 1931. From then into 1938, S-22 operated in Hawaiian waters. Departing from Pearl Harbor, on 15 October 1938, S-22 returned to New London, on 11 December 1938, where she joined a test and evaluation division. Occasionally, she was employed in training United States Naval Academy midshipmen, at Annapolis, Maryland, and assisting the diving school at Piney Point, Maryland.

After duty at Key West, Florida, from December 1940 to May 1941, and overhaul during the latter half of 1941, S-22 served in the Panama Canal area, from January to March 1942. She returned to New London, on 17 April 1942.

=== Royal Navy 1942–1944 ===
S-22 was decommissioned on 19 June 1942, and transferred to the United Kingdom, for service in the Royal Navy, as HMS P.554. The Royal Navy returned her to the US Navy at the Philadelphia Navy Yard, on 11 July 1944.

=== 1944–1945 ===
S-22 subsequently served as a sonar target at New London and in tests at the U.S. Naval Experimental Facility at Minas Basin, Nova Scotia.

== Fate ==
S-22 was struck from the Naval Vessel Register in August 1945. Her hulk was sold for scrapping, on 16 November 1945, to the North American Smelting Company, in Philadelphia.

== Awards ==
- American Defense Service Medal with "A" device
- American Campaign Medal
- World War II Victory Medal

== Bibliography ==
- "Table 21 - Ships on Navy List June 30, 1919". Congressional Serial Set. U.S. Government Printing Office: 770. 1921.
- Friedman, Norman (1995). U.S. Submarines Through 1945: An Illustrated Design History. Annapolis, Maryland: Naval Institute Press. ISBN 1-55750-263-3.
- Mohl, Michael. "S-22 (SS-127)". Navsource.net.
- Hall, Anne Martin (1925). Ships of the United States navy and their sponsors, 1913-1923.
- "S-22". Dictionary of American Naval Fighting Ships. Navy Department, Naval History and Heritage Command. 1 September 2015. This article incorporates text from this source, which is in the public domain.
