= USS S-50 =

Submarine of the United States

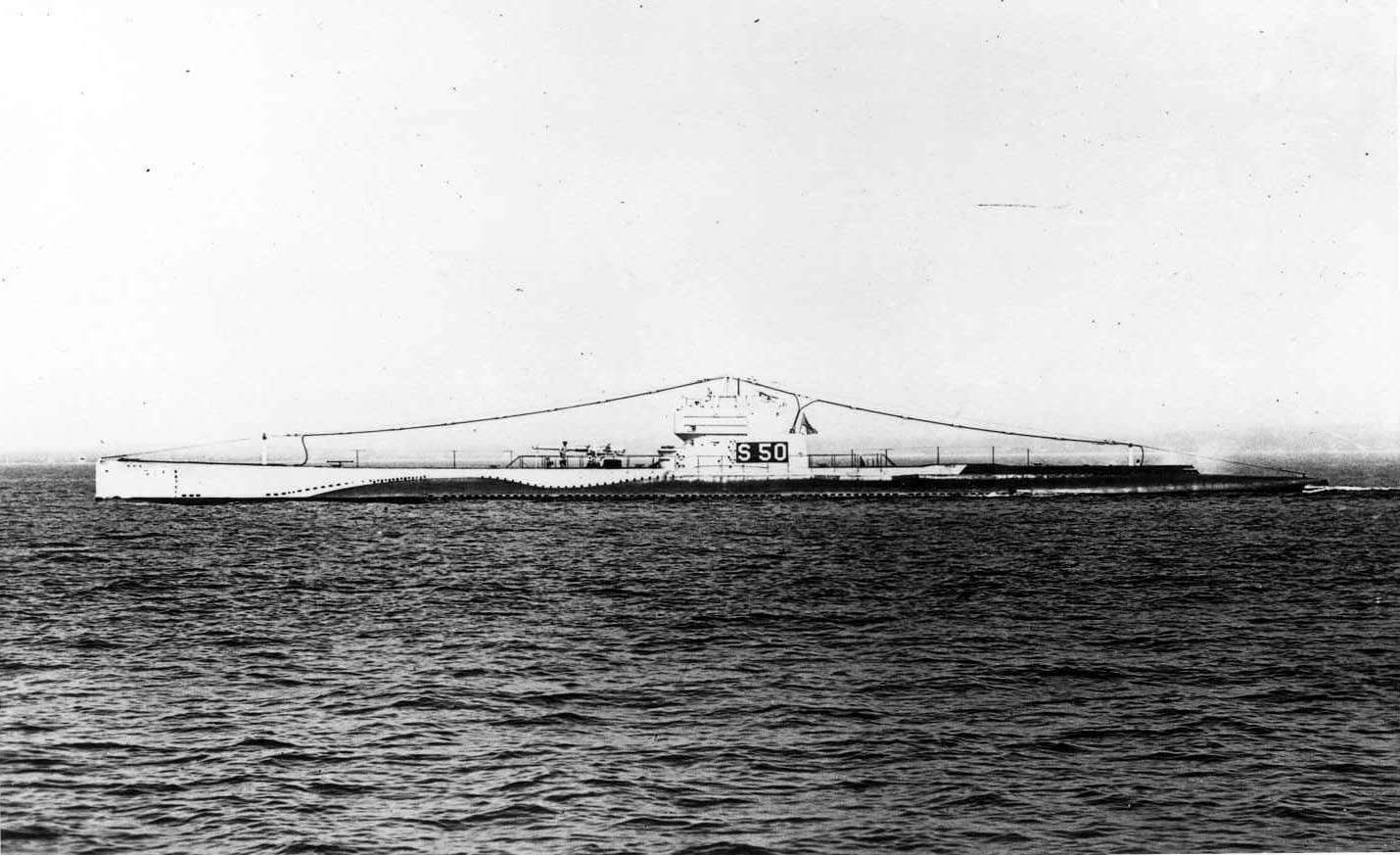
- USS S-50 (SS-161)

History

United States
- Name: USS S-50
- Builder: Lake Torpedo Boat Company, Bridgeport, Connecticut
- Laid down: 15 March 1920
- Launched: 18 June 1921
- Sponsored by: Mrs. William G. Esmond
- Commissioned: 20 May 1922
- Decommissioned: 20 August 1927
- Stricken: 31 March 1931
- Fate: Scrapped autumn 1931

General characteristics
- Class & type: S-class submarine
- Displacement: 993 long tons (1,009 t) surfaced; 1,230 long tons (1,250 t) submerged
- Length: 240 ft (73 m)
- Beam: 21 ft 10 in (6.65 m)
- Draft: 13 ft 6 in (4.11 m)
- Speed: 14.5 knots (16.7 mph; 26.9 km/h) surfaced; 11 knots (13 mph; 20 km/h) submerged
- Complement: 38 officers and men
- Armament: 1 × 4 in (102 mm)/50 deck gun; 5 × 21 inch (533 mm) torpedo tubes

USS S-50 (SS-161) was a fourth-group (S-48) S-class submarine of the United States Navy.

== Construction and commissioning ==
S-50′s keel was laid down on 15 March 1920 by the Lake Torpedo Boat Company in Bridgeport, Connecticut. She was launched on 18 June 1921, sponsored by Mrs. William G. Esmond, and commissioned on 20 May 1922.

== Service history ==
Initially assigned to experimental Submarine Division (SubDiv) Zero, then to SubDiv 4, S-50 was based at New London, Connecticut, and, until mid-June, conducted trials in the Block Island area. She then visited Poughkeepsie, New York, and New Haven, Connecticut, and, in July, moved south to Washington, DC. At the end of the month she returned to New London, whence she continued north for operations off Portsmouth, New Hampshire, and Portland, Maine. On 11 August, she returned to New London, then proceeded to Bridgeport, and remained in the builder's yard until mid-October.

Resuming active duty, she operated in the New London area into January 1923, then proceeded to New York City. Repairs and alterations at the navy yard there took her into August, when she resumed tests and exercises in the Block Island-New London area.

At the end of December, the S-boat proceeded to Staten Island, whence, on 4 January 1924, she headed south to participate in Fleet Problem III, a test of Caribbean Sea defenses and transit facilities of the Panama Canal. On completion of the problem, she put into Coco Solo. Toward the end of the month, she moved into the Virgin Islands for further operations and exercises.

At about 03:30 on 6 February, a fire started in the battery compartment. The room was sealed. At 06:57, the room was ventilated. Four minutes later, the battery exploded, and the room was sealed for another four hours. Temporary repairs were soon started, and later that month, she began the trip back to New England. Towed initially to Guantanamo Bay, she was taken to New London and then to Portsmouth, New Hampshire, for yard work. In September, S-50 departed Portsmouth, under her own power, arrived at New London on 23 February; and reported to Commander, SubDiv 2. Three weeks later, she shifted to New York, where, for the next ten months, she was used in experimental engineering work.

In mid-July 1925, S-50 returned to New London and for the next two years was primarily engaged in conducting experimental tests and performing exercises for the Submarine School. During that period, she regularly interrupted those duties for annual overhauls and individual, division, and fleet exercises; and, in July 1926, was called on to assist in salvage operations for sister ship USS S-51. Experimental work during the period took her to the Virginia Capes to participate in sound tests for the Naval Experiment Laboratory in November and December, 1926, and to southern Florida for engineering tests in January and February, 1927.

On her return from Florida in March 1927, S-50 was ordered inactivated. At the end of the month, she proceeded to Philadelphia, Pennsylvania, where she was decommissioned on 20 August 1927 and remained berthed as a unit of the inactive fleet there until the 1930s. Her name was struck from the Naval Vessel Register on 31 March 1931, and her hulk was scrapped the following fall.
