= USS S-27 =

S-class submarine of the United States

Coordinates: 51.3306°N 179.2034°E

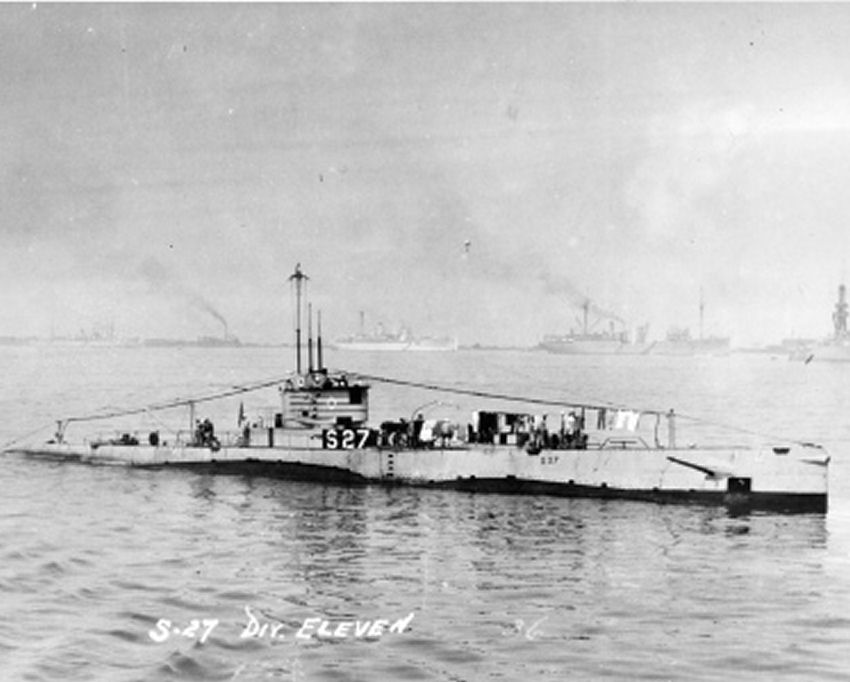
- USS S-27 (SS-127), c. 1936

History

United States
- Name: S-27
- Ordered: 4 March 1917
- Builder: Fore River Shipyard, Quincy, Massachusetts
- Cost: $677,622.74 (hull and machinery)
- Laid down: 11 April 1919
- Launched: 18 October 1922
- Sponsored by: Mrs. Helen Baldwin
- Commissioned: 22 January 1924
- Identification: Hull symbol: SS-132; Call sign: NINR
- Fate: Grounded, 19 June 1942, abandoned, 25 June 1942

General characteristics
- Class & type: S-18-class submarine
- Displacement: 930 long tons (945 t) surfaced; 1,094 long tons (1,112 t) submerged
- Length: 219 feet 3 inches (66.83 m)
- Beam: 20 ft 8 in (6.30 m)
- Draft: 17 ft 3 in (5.26 m)
- Installed power: 1,200 brake horsepower (895 kW) diesel; 2,375 hp (1,771 kW) electric
- Propulsion: 2 × NELSECO diesel engines; 2 × Ridgway Dynamo & Engine Company electric motors; 2 × 60-cell batteries; 2 × Propellers
- Speed: 14.5 knots (26.9 km/h; 16.7 mph) surfaced; 11 kn (20 km/h; 13 mph) submerged
- Range: 3,420 nmi (6,330 km; 3,940 mi) at 6.5 kn (12.0 km/h; 7.5 mph) surfaced; 8,950 nmi (16,580 km; 10,300 mi) at 9.5 kn (17.6 km/h; 10.9 mph) surfaced with fuel in main ballast tanks; 20 hours at 5 knots (9 km/h; 6 mph) submerged
- Test depth: 200 ft (61 m)
- Capacity: 41,921 US gallons (158,690 L; 34,907 imp gal) fuel oil
- Complement: 4 officers; 34 enlisted
- Armament: 4 × 21-inch (533 mm) torpedo tubes (12 torpedoes); 1 × 4-inch (102 mm)/50-caliber

USS S-27 (SS-132) was an S-18-class submarine, also referred to as an S-1-class or "Holland"-type, of the United States Navy. She was grounded and abandoned in mid- to late June 1942, with no loss of life.

== Design ==
The S-18-class had a length of 219 feet 3 inches (66.8 m) overall, a beam of 20 ft 8 in (6.3 m), and a mean draft of 17 ft 3 in (5.3 m). They displaced 930 long tons (940 t) on the surface and 1,094 long tons (1,112 t) submerged. All S-class submarines had a crew of four officers and 34 enlisted men, when first commissioned. They had a diving depth of 200 ft (61.0 m).

For surface running, the S-18-class were powered by two 600-brake-horsepower (447 kW) NELSECO diesel engines, each driving one propeller shaft. When submerged, each propeller was driven by a 1,175-horsepower (876 kW) Ridgway Dynamo & Engine Company electric motor. They could reach 14.5 knots (26.9 km/h; 16.7 mph) on the surface and 11 kn (20 km/h; 13 mph) underwater.

The boats were armed with four 21-inch (533 mm) torpedo tubes in the bow. They carried eight reloads, for a total of 12 torpedoes. The S-18-class submarines were also armed with a single 4 in (100 mm)/.50 caliber deck gun.

== Construction ==
S-27's construction was authorized in March 1917, her keel was laid down on 11 April 1919, by the Bethlehem Shipbuilding Corporation's Fore River Shipyard, in Quincy, Massachusetts. She was launched on 18 October 1922, sponsored by Mrs. Helen Baldwin, and commissioned at Groton, Connecticut, on 22 January 1924.

== Service history ==
=== 1924–1939 ===
Based at New London, Connecticut, through 1924, S-27 transferred to the Pacific, in 1925, and after exercises in the Hawaiian Islands, during the spring of 1925, arrived at her new homeport, San Diego, California, in June 1925. She was based in Southern California until 1931, and except for fleet maneuvers, operated primarily off that coast. Fleet maneuvers, exercises, and fleet problems took her to the west coast of Central America, to the Panama Canal Zone, into the Caribbean Sea, and to the Territory of Hawaii.

In 1931, S-27 was transferred to Hawaii, and on 23 February 1931, she arrived at Pearl Harbor, from where she operated until 16 June 1939, when she departed for San Diego. She arrived there on 27 June 1939, and resumed operations off the Southern California coast, conducting exercises and tests, primarily for the Underwater Sound Training School. In late November 1941, she proceeded to Mare Island Naval Shipyard, where she began an overhaul.

=== 1941–1942 ===
S-27 still was undergoing overhaul when the United States entered World War II with the Japanese attack on Pearl Harbor of 7 December 1941. After completion of her overhaul, she stood out of San Francisco Bay, on 23 January 1942, and headed south.

On 26 January 1942, she arrived at San Diego, and where she resumed operations for the Underwater Sound Training School, which she continued into the spring of 1942. Then ordered north to the Aleutian Islands, she departed San Diego, on 20 May 1942, proceeded to Port Angeles, Washington, and then continued on to the waters of the Territory of Alaska, where she commenced patrol operations.

On 12 June 1942, a little over a week after the beginning of the Aleutian Islands campaign, S-27 put into Dutch Harbor, on Amaknak Island, off Unalaska, in the Aleutian Islands, took on provisions, refueled, and then headed west with orders to patrol in the Kuluk Bay area, on the northeastern side of Adak Island, and reconnoiter Constantine Harbor, on the coast of Amchitka.

On the night of 16–17 June 1942, she received orders to move to Kiska. On 18 June 1942, she reconnoitered Constantine Harbor, found no signs of enemy activity in the evacuated village there, and moved on to round the southern end of Amchitka, from which she proceeded to Kiska. In midafternoon on 18 June 1942, she rounded East Cape.

==== Grounding and loss ====
When S-27 surfaced, on the evening of 18 June 1942, fog obscured her position. Lying to, to charge her batteries, on both engines, she was carried about 5 nmi (9.3 km; 5.8 mi) from her estimated position based on dead reckoning position. The fog prevented her crew from detecting that she was drifting. At midnight, she got underway slowly on one engine and continued to charge on the other. Soon after 00:43, on 19 June 1942, her crew sighted breakers about 25 yards (23 m; 75 ft) forward of her bow. "Back emergency" orders were given, but seconds later she grounded on rocks off St. Makarius Point.

Waves bumped S-27 violently against the rocks, rolling her 10 to 15° on each side. Her engines continued at "back emergency", but a submerged rock held her firmly. Her crew dumped fuel to lighten her and continued efforts to back off the rocks, but the lightened submarine only swung harder against the rocks. Her starboard screw struck a rock and was disabled. S-27's crew attempted to force her ahead to clear the stern, but she only moved about 20 ft (6.1 m) forward before the rocks again held her fast. Her crew sounded the immediate area, but found no passage. She transmitted the first of six distress signals at 01:15, but Dutch Harbor received only one of them, and it did not give her position.

By 03:30, the pounding of the sea had increased and plans were made to move the greater part of her crew off. A ferry system, using a rubber boat and lines rigged between the ship and the beach, was set up. Men, provisions, clothing, guns, and medical supplies were transferred safely. By 11:00, all but six of her crew, the commanding officer and five others, were ashore. The men still aboard destroyed S-27's equipment and burned her classified material. By 15:30, S-27's side plating was loose and her torpedo room was flooding and three of the remaining men went ashore. At 15:50, the last three men, the radioman, the executive officer, and commanding officer, left the submarine.

S-27's crew spent the night of 19–20 June 1942, in an unsheltered cove. On 20 June 1942, the crew set up camp at Constantine Harbor, using buildings and heating equipment there, which had survived a Japanese bombing. By 21 June 1942, the camp was fully organized, with established routines, including sentries and lookouts. Trips to and from the cove continued for three days. S-27 was reboarded on 21 and 22 June 1942, to take off more supplies, but thereafter, the presence of poisonous chlorine gas due, to the reaction of seawater with her battery cells, precluded further visits.

On 24 June 1942, a US Navy PBY Catalina flying boat on a routine flight spotted the activity at Constantine Harbor, landed, and took off 15 of the survivors. On 25 June 1942, three planes arrived to take off the remainder. The men destroyed all guns they had salvaged from S-27 before they departed, leaving behind nothing except S-27's abandoned wreck and canned provisions, blankets, and winter clothing.

== Awards ==
- American Defense Service Medal
- American Campaign Medal
- Asiatic-Pacific Campaign Medal
- World War II Victory Medal

== Bibliography ==
- "Table 21 - Ships on Navy List June 30, 1919". Congressional Serial Set. U.S. Government Printing Office. 1921.
- Friedman, Norman (1995). U.S. Submarines Through 1945: An Illustrated Design History. Annapolis, Maryland: Naval Institute Press. ISBN 1-55750-263-3.
- Priolo, Gary. "S-27 (SS-132)". Navsource.net.
- "S-27". Dictionary of American Naval Fighting Ships. Navy Department, Naval History and Heritage Command. 1 September 2015. This article incorporates text from this source, which is in the public domain.
- Hall, Anne Martin (1925). Ships of the United States navy and their sponsors, 1913-1923.
