= USS S-47 =

Submarine of the United States

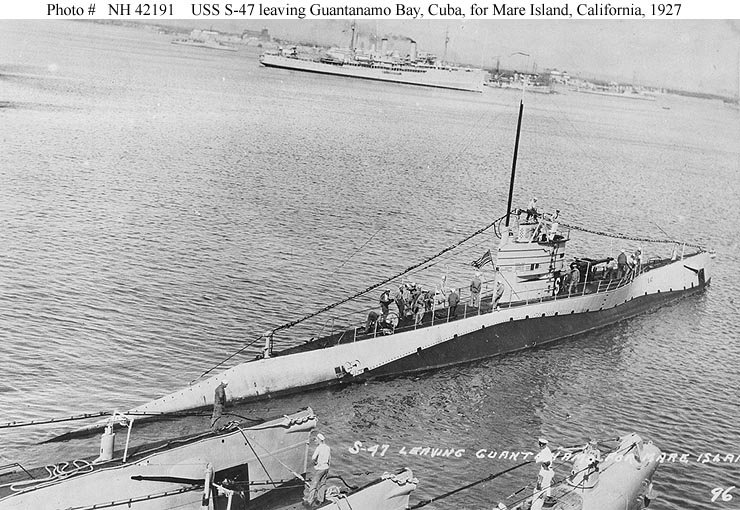
- USS S-47 departing Guantanamo Bay, Cuba, in April 1927 bound for Mare Island Navy Yard, Vallejo, California.

History

United States
- Name: USS S-47
- Builder: Bethlehem Shipbuilding Corporation, Quincy, Massachusetts
- Laid down: 26 February 1921
- Launched: 5 January 1924
- Sponsored by: Mrs. Morris D. Gilmore
- Commissioned: 16 September 1925
- Decommissioned: 25 October 1945
- Stricken: 13 November 1945
- Fate: Sold for scrapping May 1946

General characteristics
- Class & type: S-class submarine
- Displacement: 850 long tons (864 t) surfaced; 1,126 long tons (1,144 t) submerged
- Length: 225 ft 3 in (68.66 m)
- Beam: 20 ft 8 in (6.30 m)
- Draft: 16 ft (4.9 m)
- Speed: 14.5 knots (16.7 mph; 26.9 km/h) surfaced; 11 knots (13 mph; 20 km/h) submerged
- Complement: 42 officers and men
- Armament: 1 × 4 in (102 mm)/50 deck gun; 4 × 21 inch (533 mm) torpedo tubes

Service record
- Operations: World War II
- Awards: 3 battle stars

USS S-47 (SS-158) was a third-group (S-42) S-class submarine of the United States Navy.

== Construction and commissioning ==
S-47′s keel was laid down on 26 February 1921 by the Bethlehem Shipbuilding Corporation's Fore River Shipyard in Quincy, Massachusetts. She was launched on 5 January 1924 sponsored by Mrs. Morris D. Gilmore, and commissioned on 16 September 1925.

== History ==
Following commissioning and fitting out, S-47 conducted engineering and torpedo tests off the southern New England coast. However, with the new year, 1926, she departed New England and moved south to join Submarine Division (SubDiv) 19 in the Panama Canal Zone.

She arrived at Coco Solo on 19 January and, for the next year and one-half, conducted local operations in the Pacific Ocean and Caribbean Sea. During this period, her routine was broken by joint United States Army-United States Navy exercises testing the defenses of the canal; by Fleet Problem VI (February 1926) and VII (March 1927); and by extended training cruises in the Caribbean (June 1926 and April 1927). Transferred to San Diego, California, with her division in June 1927, she continued to participate in individual, division, fleet, and joint Army-Navy exercises into 1932. At that time, a period of inactivity in rotating reserve status was added to S-boat employment schedules.

In 1936, S-47, now in SubDiv 11, was transferred back to Coco Solo, where she was based through the end of the decade. In the summer of 1941, she returned to New London, Connecticut, and commenced operations off the southern New England coast. During September, she patrolled in the Bermuda area; and, in October, she returned to New London. The following month, she moved north to NS Argentia to participate in exercises to test S-boat capabilities in arctic and sub-arctic waters.

=== World War II ===
Following the attack on Pearl Harbor, by mid-December 1941, she was back at New London, and, by January 1942, she was back in the Panama Canal Zone.

Defensive operations in the approaches to the canal took S-47 into March. On 5 March, she moved west with SubDiv 53 to join TF 42 at Brisbane, Queensland. She arrived in mid-April, and, on 22 April, she got underway to conduct her first offensive war patrol in the New Britain-New Ireland area.

=== First War Patrol ===
On 27 April, she commenced submerged operations during daylight hours. On the morning of 29 April, she passed Bougainville, and on the night of 30 April, she arrived off New Britain. The next evening, she attempted to close an enemy submarine but lost contact with the target. That night, she transited St. George Channel; and, on the morning of 2 May, she closed Blanche Bay. Despite numerous enemy patrol craft both surface and air, off the Crater Peninsula, she moved toward Simpson Harbor in an attempt to score on an oiler accompanied by a destroyer. Her quarry, however, reached safety before S-47 could close the range.

S-47 waited outside the harbor. Four hours later, two destroyers entered the harbor, and, a short while after that, a cruiser was sighted on the same course. S-47 increased her speed and maneuvered to attack. But, before she was ready, a short in the electrical firing circuit fired number-four tube. The cruiser continued into the harbor. The electrical firing circuit in S-47 was disconnected.

Still in the area on 3 May, S-47 became the target of a three-hour submarine hunt conducted by two destroyers and two minesweepers and punctuated by frequent depth charge attacks. That night, she cleared the area. By 5 May, she was off New Hanover; and, on 8 May, she fired on a cargoman which reversed course and headed for the submarine at high speed. S-47 went deep and readied two tubes for firing. The target, however, passed overhead; resumed its original course; and soon outdistanced the submarine.

S-47 remained on patrol in that area for another four days. On 12 May, she shifted to the Buka area and patrolled off Queen Carola Harbor until 15 May. She then turned for Brisbane.

=== Second War Patrol ===
In port for repairs from 20 May until early June, S-47 cleared Moreton Bay on 6 June to return to New Britain. Again, she hunted off the Crater Peninsula and between there and the Duke of York Islands; then moved into the Shortland Island area before heading for Australia on 22 June.

=== Third War Patrol ===
She departed the Australian coast again on 28 July, but fuel tank leaks forced her to turn back on 1 August. From 5–24 August, she was back in Brisbane. On 25 August, she was again underway for St. George Channel and the area to the northwest of Rabaul. On 2 September, her patrol was shifted to include the eastern and southeastern coasts of New Ireland, where, on 12 September, she damaged an enemy warship. On 22 September, she returned to Brisbane.

=== Fourth War Patrol ===
Twenty-eight days later, S-47 departed Moreton Bay for her last war patrol as a unit of TF 42. Moving across the Coral Sea and into the Solomon Islands, she sighted Shortland Island on 28 October, and, on the night of 30/31 October, commenced hunting on the Buin-Rabaul line. On 2 November, east of Bougainville, she damaged a second Japanese warship. Two days later, she began moving southeast. On 8 November, she passed San Cristobal Island and departed the Solomons, en route to the Fiji Islands and the Panama Canal.

=== Refit ===
On 17 November 1942, S-47 joined other units of SubDiv 53 and submarine tender USS Griffin in Suva Harbor, whence the group proceeded to Coco Solo. There, during the first quarter of 1943, S-47 underwent overhaul and received a surface search radar. In March, she was ordered to Trinidad, British West Indies, to furnish training services for antisubmarine vessels stationed there. But she was soon recalled to the Canal Zone, then ordered to San Francisco, California, for further yard work at the Bethlehem Steel Company. Arriving early in May, she remained in the shipyard through the summer; and, after training off the southern California coast in September, she headed north to the Aleutian Islands.

=== Fifth and Sixth War Patrols ===
In October 1943, S-47 arrived at Dutch Harbor, Unalaska, whence she conducted two war patrols to impede Japanese traffic in the Paramushiro area. On 3 January 1944, she completed the second of her two North Pacific patrols, and, a month later, she departed the Aleutians to return to the southwestern Pacific.

=== Seventh War Patrol ===
Arriving at Milne Bay on 17 March, S-47 joined TF 72; and, for the next two months, conducted ASW training operations for Seventh Fleet minesweepers. In June, however, she shifted to Seeadler Harbor in the Admiralty Islands, whence she departed on another war patrol on 17 June. The patrol, conducted to support the Allied thrust along the New Guinea coast, was completed on 5 July. This was one of the last war patrols by an S boat.

Availability at Brisbane followed and, at the end of August, she returned to Seeadler Harbor to resume ASW training operations. In November, she shifted to Mios Woendi; and, in February 1945, she headed for Brisbane, whence, on 8 March, she sailed for the United States. She arrived at San Diego in mid-April and remained there until after the cessation of hostilities in the Pacific. In mid-September, she moved up to San Francisco.

== Dcomissioning and disposal ==
On 25 October 1945, S-47 was decommissioned. Her name was struck from the Naval Vessel Register on 13 November 1945, and she was sold for scrapping in May 1946.

== Awards ==
- American Defense Service Medal with "FLEET" clasp and "A" device
- American Campaign Medal
- Asiatic-Pacific Campaign Medal with three battle stars
- World War II Victory Medal
