= United States S-class submarine =

Submarine class

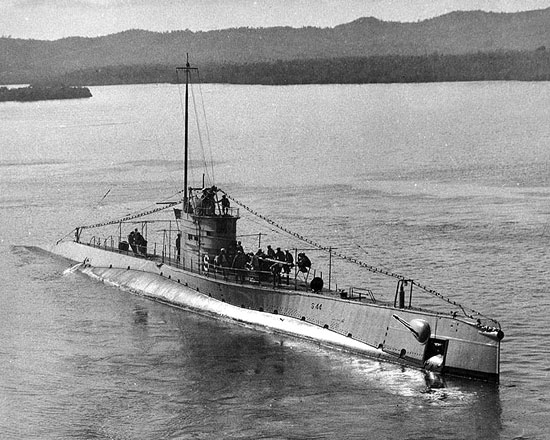
- S-class submarine USS S-44 (SS-155) leaving Guantanamo Bay, Cuba, c. 1929

Class overview
- Name: S class
- Builders: Fore River Shipyard (S-1 and S-42-class); Union Iron Works (S-1-class); Portsmouth Navy Yard (S-3-class); Lake Torpedo Boat (S-2, S-3 and S-48-class)
- Operators: United States Navy; Polish Navy; Royal Navy
- Preceded by: R class
- Succeeded by: V-boats
- Subclasses: S-1, S-2, S-3, S-18, S-42, and S-48
- Built: 1918–1925
- In commission: 1920–1946
- Planned: 65
- Completed: 51
- Canceled: 14
- Lost: 9
- Retired: 42

General characteristics Prototype S-class boats
- Type: Submarine
- Displacement: 800–875 long tons (813–889 t) surfaced; 977–1,088 long tons (993–1,105 t) submerged
- Length: 207 ft 0 in – 231 ft 0 in (63.1–70.4 m)
- Beam: 19 ft 7 in – 21 ft 1 in (5.98–6.43 m)
- Draft: 13 ft 1 in – 16 ft 2 in (4–4.93 m)
- Depth: 200 ft (61 m)
- Installed power: 1,200–1,800 bhp (890–1,340 kW) diesel; 1,200 hp – 1,500 hp (1,100 kW) electric
- Propulsion: 2 × NELSECO or Busch-Sulzer diesel engines; 2 × Electro-Dynamic Company, Diehl Manufacture Company, or Westinghouse Electric Corporation electric motors; 1 × 120-cell battery; 2 × Propellers
- Speed: 14.5–15 kn (26.9–27.8 km/h; 16.7–17.3 mph) surface; 11 kn (20 km/h; 13 mph) submerged
- Complement: 4 officers; 34 enlisted
- Armament: 4 × 21 inch (533 mm) torpedo tubes (bow), 12 torpedoes; (S-10 to S-17 and S-48 to S-51 had an additional 21 inch stern tube with 2 additional torpedoes); 1 × 4-inch (102 mm)/50 caliber deck gun

The United States' S-class submarines, often simply called S-boats (sometimes "Sugar" boats, after the contemporary Navy phonetic alphabet for "S"), were the first class of submarines with a significant number built to United States Navy designs. They made up the bulk of the USN submarine service in the interwar years and could be found in almost every theater of operations. While not considered fleet submarines, they were the first submarines in the USN designed for open ocean, blue water operations. All previous submarines had been intended for harbor or coastal defense. These boats were intended to have greater speed and range than previous classes, with improved habitability and greater armament.

The S-class were designed during World War I, but not completed until after the war. Many boats of the class remained in service through World War II.

The United States Navy commissioned 51 S-class submarines from 1920 to 1925. The first boat in name sequence, USS S-1 (SS-105), was commissioned in 1920, and the last numerically, USS S-51 (SS-162), in 1922. Severe production difficulties encountered by the Electric Boat Company (EB) threw the production sequence into disarray and the last of the class actually commissioned was USS S-47 (SS-158), in September 1925.

The boats built by EB are referred to as the S-1 class, S-18 class, or Holland type. The Lake built S-2 design, was rejected by the Navy and was not repeated. The Navy built boats are referred to as the S-3 or S-4 class, the "Navy" type, the "Bureau" type, or the "Government" type. The Navy did contract Lake to build boats of their design.

== Design and construction ==
Intelligence reports received from 1914 to 1916, showed that the German U-boats, then operating off Great Britain, far exceeded the capabilities of the H, K, L, and N classes of USN submarines then in service. If Great Britain were to fall, those boats would be unable to cross the Atlantic and fight, once they got there, and this drove the requirements for the designs that would become the S-class. The Navy's specifications called for a boat of 800 long tons (813 t), with a speed of 11–14 kn (20–26 km/h; 13–16 mph), and a range between 3,400 and 5,400 nmi (6,300 and 10,000 km; 3,900 and 6,200 mi). They would be armed with four 21 inch (533 mm) torpedo tubes and a 4 in (102 mm)/50 caliber deck gun. The Navy turned to its traditional submarine builders, the Electric Boat Company (EB) and Lake Torpedo Boat Company, and asked them to submit designs, but for the first time, the Navy itself developed a design to be built at its own Navy Yards. The Navy wanted to diversify the acquisition process and provide some level of competition to Electric Boat and Lake.

The Navy requested a prototype from all three designers. The first three boats in name sequence, S-1, S-2, and S-3, were prototypes, authorized in Fiscal Year 1918, and were built to the same basic specifications: S-1 was a single-hull design by EB, S-2 was a double-hull by Lake, and S-3 was also a double-hull design by the Bureau of Construction and Repair (BuC&R) (later Bureau of Ships). Even though the FY-18 boats were considered to be prototypes, the EB and the BuC&R designs, were intended for series production from the very beginning.

The boats of the S-class may have been designed to the same set of specification, but like the classes that preceded them, they were very different between the builders. The S-class may be subdivided into four groups of different designs, five if you included the rejected Lake design:

- Group I (S-1 or S-18 class, or "Holland" type): 25 boats, S-1 and S-18 to S-29, were built by Bethlehem Steel, at their Fore River Shipyard, in Quincy, Massachusetts, and S-30 to S-41 at their Union Iron Works, in San Francisco, California, as the subcontractor for the Electric Boat Company.
- Group II (S-3 or S-4 class, or "Navy" type): 15 boats, S-3 to S-13, built at the Portsmouth Navy Yard, in Kittery, Maine, and S-14 to S-17, at the Lake Torpedo Boat Company, in Bridgeport, Connecticut.
- Group III (S-42 class, or "Modified Holland" type): 6 boats, S-42 to S-47, built by EB, in Quincy.
- Group IV (S-48 class, or "Modified Navy" type): 4 boats, S-48 to S-51, built by Lake, in Bridgeport.

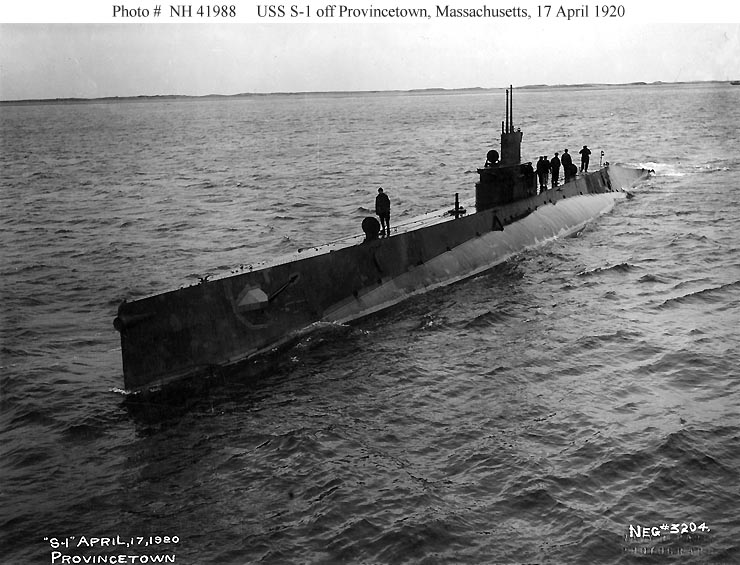
USS S-1 off Provincetown, Massachusetts, on 17 April 1920, while running sea trials

The EB design, S-1, formed the basis for the Group I and Group III boats, and were essentially enlarged versions of all their previous designs. A single hull design, all of the ballast tanks were contained within the pressure hull. The hull was a rounded spindle shape and the rudder was placed at the very end of the hull, aft of the twin screws. Compared to the previous R-boats, Group I S-boats were 33 ft (10.1 m) longer, with 3 ft 3 in (1.0 m) more beam, 2 ft 3 in (0.7 m) more draft, and 60% greater displacement. This allowed for greater range, larger engines, and higher speed, and more torpedo reloads, though the number of forward torpedo tubes was unchanged.

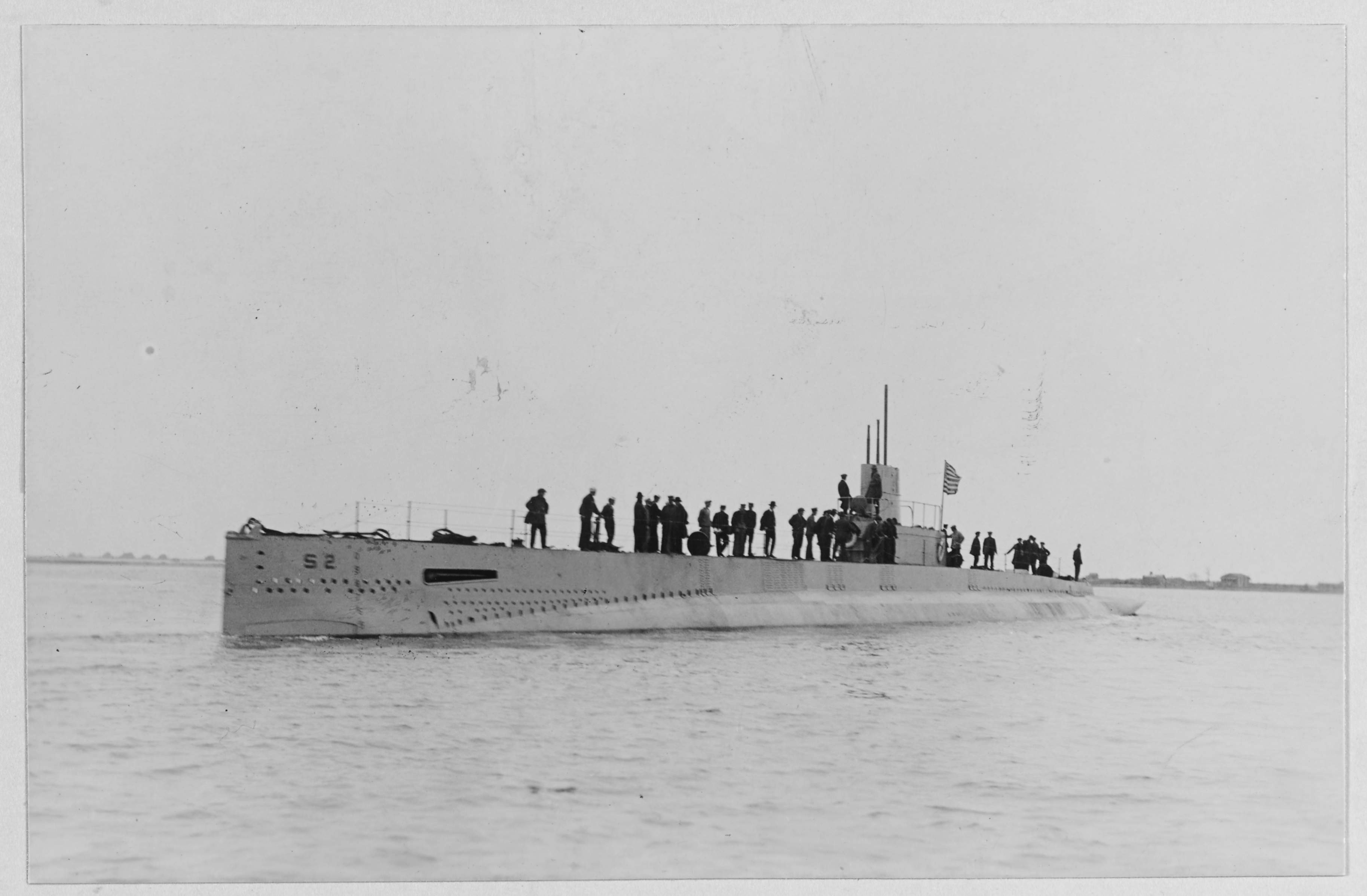
USS S-2 backing at low speed, probably off Bridgeport, Connecticut, at the time of her builders' trials in September 1919, many of the men standing on her deck are civilians

The Lake design, S-2, was a modified double-hull type, with ballast tanks wrapped around the inner pressure hull. The stern ended in a flat "shovel" shape which gave the stern needed buoyancy. The rudder was mounted beneath the stern and the pivot structure also supported the stern diving planes. To gain surface buoyancy, the superstructure atop the boat was partially watertight. Sea trials showed that the bow tended to burrow into the waves so Lake added a buoyancy tank to the bow, which gave it a humped appearance. This boat suffered from poor maneuverability and was overcomplicated. It proved to be unreliable and was not well liked by its crew. The Navy did not choose it for mass production and no further boats were produced to this design.

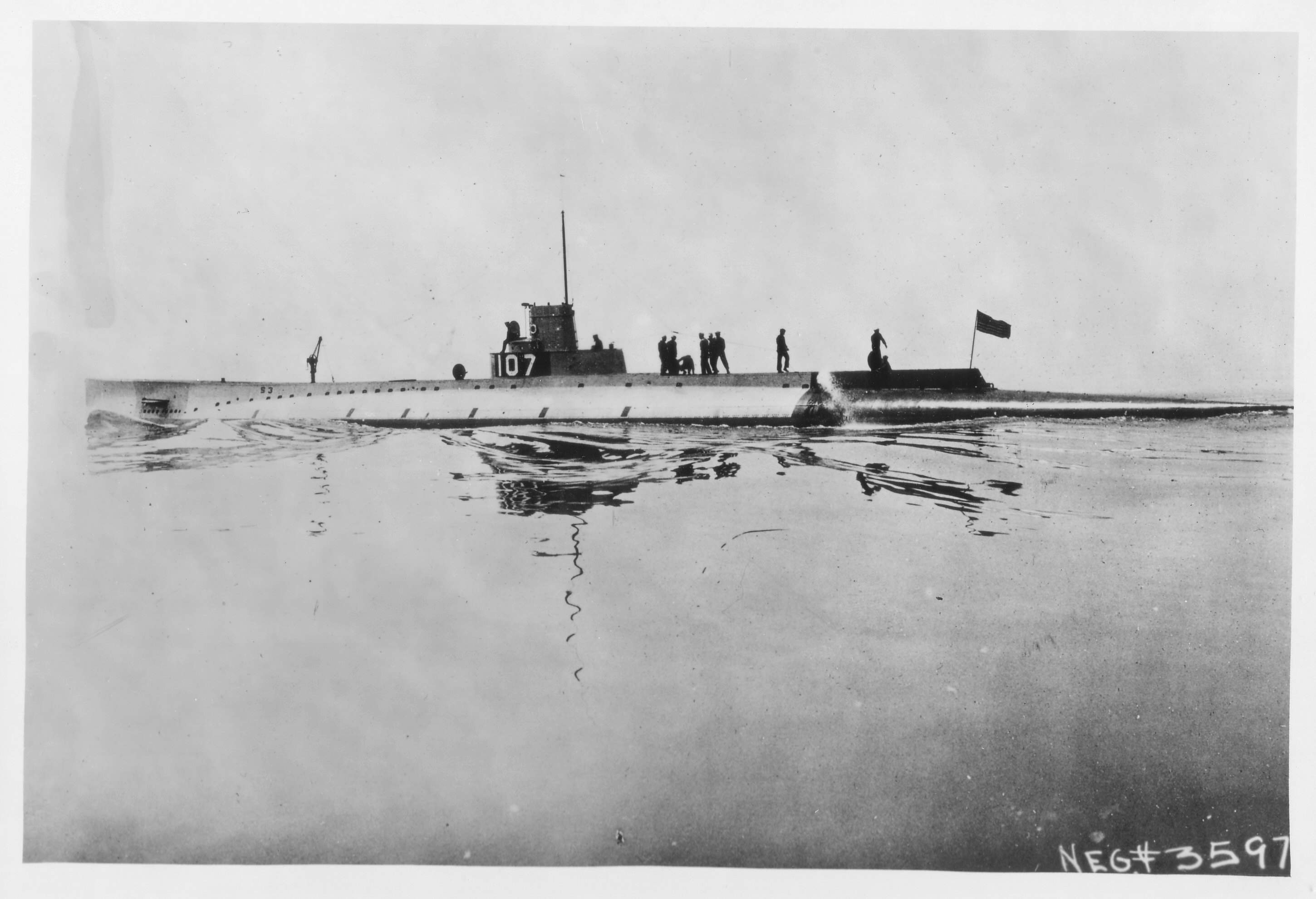
Portside view of USS S-3 on her trials, May 1919, notice the complete lack of an enclosed bridge fairwater, or her 4"/50 caliber gun, a features that were added later

The BuC&R design, S-3, formed the basis for the Group II and Group IV boats, was a full double hull type that incorporated some design features of both the Electric Boat and Lake designs. At 231 ft (70 m) long, it was longer, and a little wider, than the other two designs. The battery was contained in one large compartment forward of the control room, giving the boat a long, sleek appearance. The long hull ended in a sharp vertical "chisel" at the stern, and the rudder and stern dive planes were ventrally mounted under the hull, behind the propellers. One drawback to the "Navy" type was that their main ballast tanks were divided into an upper and lower tank, which caused them to dive slow due to the fact that the upper tank wouldn't start filling until it was submerged.

After WWI, US officers were impressed by the stern torpedo tubes on the German U-boats, the last four of Group II, and all four of Group IV boats, had an additional single stern torpedo tube added. Group IV was also longer and had less draft. A 5-inch (127 mm) deck gun had initially been requested, but due to space restraints and drag, all S-boats were eventually outfitted with a 4-inch (102 mm)/50 caliber deck gun, a significant increase over the 3-inch (76 mm)/23 caliber and 3-in/50 caliber guns of previous US submarines. This was due to observations that the German U-boats frequently used their deck guns, and many U-boats were equipped with 105 mm (4.1 in) deck guns. Another improvement was the conning tower fairwater. Previous US submarines had small fairwaters to reduce drag and improve submerged speed. Experience gained on North Atlantic patrols during World War I showed that the boats would be spending considerable time on the surface and thus needed better protection for the bridge watchstanders. Examination of captured U-boats after the Armistice also showed that a larger fairwater with permanent grab rails was preferable when surfaced in the North Atlantic, so S-boats were built or refitted with an improved and much larger fairwater.

The first S-boat placed into commission was S-3, on 30 January 1919, followed in order by S-4, S-5, S-6, and S-2. EB's contractors in Quincy and San Francisco, worked in parallel, with the first unit, S-1, built in Quincy, and commissioned on 5 June 1920, and the first unit from San Francisco, being the USS S-30 (SS-135), commissioned on 29 October 1920.

SS-163 to SS-168, "Modified Holland", and SS-173 to SS-176, "Modified Navy", were cancelled, and contrary to later practice, the hull numbers were used for subsequent submarines. Some of the material for these was used by EB to build the Peruvian Navy's four R-boats.

Future Admiral, Hyman G. Rickover, was assigned to S-48. He later credited the "faulty, sooty, dangerous and repellent engineering" of the S-class boats with inspiring his obsession for high engineering standards.

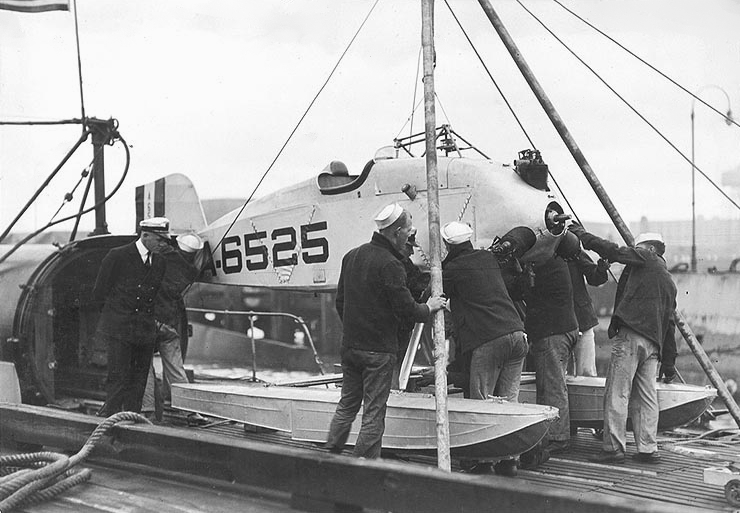
Martin MS-1 scouting seaplane (Bureau # A-6525) being assembled on the after deck of S-1 (SS-105), at Hampton Roads, Virginia, 24 October 1923

Profile schematic of typical example of S-18 subclass, USS S-19 (SS-124)

In 1923, S-1 experimented with a Martin MS-1 seaplane, an idea the Japanese would later adopt. A cylindrical hangar was installed on the after deck to house a single Martin MS-1 seaplane. Tests showed the concept to be unworkable, and the equipment was subsequently removed. The hangar was later reused and rebuilt as the prototype for the McCann Rescue Chamber, a diving bell for rescuing crewmen from sunken submarines.

== Service ==
=== Between the Wars ===
The first two boats completed by EB were S-1 at Quincy and S-30 at San Francisco. During builder's sea trials both boats experienced severe torsional drive train vibrations during their required high-speed runs. The vibrations were so bad that both engines on both submarines were completely wrecked. Subsequent investigation showed that the crankshafts of the NELSECO 8-EB-15 diesel engines were of an insufficient diameter, and were not stiff enough to resist the power stroke of each cylinder/piston as it fired, resulting in excessive torsional twisting. This was a serious deficiency, and a severe setback for EB production. Some boats lingered incomplete at the builder's yards, while others limped along at reduced power until a fix could be implemented. Eventually, the Navy Department, faced with the prospect of having a majority of the S-class being unable to meet its desired operational parameters, acquired additional funding for EB to rebuild the engines with a crankshaft of increased diameter. This solved the torsional vibration problem, but the rebuild work considerably delayed the delivery of the EB boats to the Navy, resulting in average build times exceeding 4 1/2 years. Once the engine problem was resolved, the EB boats turned in excellent service to the USN, with many serving until the end of WWII.

The boats built to the BuC&R design, by Portsmouth and Lake, used a Bureau built MAN diesel engine, or in the case of Lake, a 2-cycle or 4-cycle Busch-Sulzer engine. These engine types, while still suffering from design and engineering problems inherent in all early diesel engines, were much more reliable than the NELSECO engines, used by EB, and they turned in acceptable performance throughout their service lives.

=== World War II service ===
At the entry of the United States into World War II, in December 1941, the S-class submarines ranged in age from 16 to 21 years. While the US Navy had two older classes of submarines at that time, the O and R classes, originally commissioned in 1918 and 1919, the S-class was the oldest class of submarine, possibly in the world, to be used in combat operations.

The Navy had 37 S-boats in service when the United States entered the war. Twenty S-boats were awarded battle stars and 17 were credited with sinking a collective total of 42 Japanese ships. Six commissioned S-boats were lost during the war, three by grounding, one by collision, one by flooding, and one, S-44, in combat.

Some S-class boats were transferred to other navies. Five, S-1, S-21, S-22, S-24, and S-29, were transferred to the Royal Navy, between March and September 1942, and one, S-25, to Poland, in November 1941. These were mostly used for training in anti-submarine warfare (ASW) and removed from service by mid-1944.

S boats saw service in World War II, in both the Atlantic and the Pacific. Smaller and slower than the later fleet submarines produced for war service, and lacking the range for Pacific Ocean patrols, as well as being 20 years old, they were used in reconnaissance and supply roles, as well as for coastal defense.

Eight S-boats, S-11 thru S-17 and S-48, spent the war entirely in the Atlantic theater. Their operations ranged from Coco Solo, in Panama, to Casco Bay, in Maine.

S-boats operated in the Alaska theater, during the aftermath of the Battle of the Aleutian Islands, based out of Dutch Harbor. Some also operated out of Australia, in the Southwest Pacific Area. Most were withdrawn from front-line service by late 1943, as more Gato-class fleet submarines became available, and were relegated to ASW training. Two S boats, S-42 and S-47, conducted combat patrols in 1944, with the last combat patrol by an S boat being conducted by S-42, from 5 August to 3 September 1944.

In World War II, S-class boats did not use the newer Mark 14 torpedo, standard in fleet submarines, due to shorter torpedo tubes, relying on the World War I-vintage Mark 10 instead. Due to production shortages, many fleet boats also used Mark 10s. Since the Mark 14 suffered from a high failure rate early in the war, this was not necessarily a disadvantage.

The most notable combat success for the class was by S-44. In the aftermath of the disastrous defeat of the USN and Royal Australian Navy (RAN), at the Battle of Savo Island, S-44 encountered the withdrawing Japanese force near Kavieng, on the morning of 10 August 1942. Having found themselves in the perfect position, the crew of S-44 launched a spread of four Mark 10s, three of which hit the Japanese heavy cruiser Kako. The mortally wounded cruiser sank in seven minutes and S-44 escaped.

As newer submarines were put in service during World War II, S-boats were withdrawn from combat service and provided training support instead. Starting in late 1944, a total of 11 boats were decommissioned, and used for experimental purposes, including being sunk by experimental weapons.

Thirteen S-boats were still in service when the Japanese surrendered, on 2 September 1945. Of the 13, 11 were decommissioned, in October 1945, one in November, and S-15, remained in commission until June 1946.

== S-boat fates ==
=== Lost at sea between wars ===
4 submarines (2 raised and returned to service)

- S-4 (SS-109) - Sunk in a collision with the United States Coast Guard destroyer Paulding, off Provincetown, Massachusetts, on 17 December 1927, 40 men were killed; later raised, repaired, and recommissioned on 16 October 1928 and served as a salvage and submarine escape test boat, before finally being sunk as a target, 15 May 1936.
- S-5 (SS-110) - Lost 1 September 1920, in a diving accident off the Delaware Capes, with no loss of life. Subsequent salvage attempts failed and the boat was left on the bottom off Cape May, New Jersey.
- S-48 (SS-159) - Sunk in a diving accident, with no loss of life, before commissioning, 7 December 1921; raised and commissioned on 14 October 1922; served during World War II, and scrapped in 1946.
- S-51 (SS-162) - Sunk in a collision with SS City of Rome, off Block Island, 25 September 1925, 33 men were killed; raised and later scrapped 1930.

=== Decommissioned and scrapped before World War II ===
5 submarines

- S-2 (SS-106) - scrapped, 14 September 1931
- S-8 (SS-113) - 25 January 1937
- S-10 (SS-115) - scrapped, 13 November 1936
- S-19 (SS-124) - sunk as target, 18 December 1938
- S-50 (SS-161) - scrapped, 1936

=== Decommissioned before WWII eventually scrapped ===
4 submarines (all decommissioned in early 1931)

- S-3 (SS-107) - scrapped, unknown date
- S-6 (SS-111) - scrapped, unknown date
- S-7 (SS-112) - scrapped, unknown date
- S-9 (SS-114) - scrapped, unknown date

=== Transferred to the Royal Navy during World War II ===
6 submarines

- S-1 (SS-105) to RN as P.552, in 1942, removed from service, January 1944; returned to US, 16 October 1944, and scrapped, sold for scrapping 14 September 1945.
- S-21 (SS-126) to RN as P.553, 14 September 1942; returned to US, 11 July 1944, and sunk as target, 23 March 1945.
- S-22 (SS-127) to RN as P.554; returned to US, 11 July 1944, and sold for scrapping, 16 November 1945.
- S-24 (SS-129) to RN as P.555; returned to US, and sunk as target, 25 August 1947.
- S-25 (SS-130) to RN as P.551, 4 November 1941; later transferred to the Polish Navy, as ORP Jastrząb; scuttled after hit by friendly fire, 2 May 1942.
- S-29 (SS-134) to RN as P.556; returned to US, on paper, in 1946, after battery explosion, partially scrapped in UK, 1947, scrapping completed in Spain, 1987.

=== Lost during World War II ===
8 submarines (1 by enemy action, 1 by friendly fire, 1 by collision, 1 foundered, 3 grounded, 1 after decommissioning)

- The former S-25 (SS-130), serving in the Polish Navy as ORP Jastrząb, was severely damaged by friendly fire from a Norwegian destroyer and a British minesweeper on 2 May 1942 and was scuttled.
- S-26 (SS-131) Sunk in a collision with Sturdy, in the Gulf of Panama, 24 January 1942; The wreck was eventually found and surveyed by the Lost 52 Project.
- S-27 (SS-132) Grounded, 19 June 1942, off St. Makarius Point, Amchitka Island, Alaska. Abandoned, 25 June 1942.
- S-28 (SS-133) Sunk 4 July 1944, due to a hull failure, off Pearl Harbor. The wreck was found in two pieces by the Lost 52 Project, in December 2017.
- S-36 (SS-141) Grounded, on Taka Bakang Reef, in the Makassar Strait, Dutch East Indies. Scuttled, 21 January 1942.
- S-39 (SS-144) Grounded, 13 August 1942, off Rossel Island, in the Coral Sea.
- S-44 (SS-155) Lost to enemy action, enroute to her patrol area, near the Kuril Islands. Sunk by the Japanese escort ship Ishigaki, 7 October 1943.
- S-49 (SS-160) Stricken and sold for scrap, 25 May 1931; hulked in 1936; hulk reacquired by the US Navy for "experimental purposes"; foundered and sank off Point Patience, in the Patuxent River, 16 December 1942. This is not counted among the 52 US submarines lost during World War II, as the vessel was not in commission at the time.

=== Other fates ===
11 submarines

Decommissioned in 1944 and 1945, prior to the surrender of Japan. They were mostly expended as targets. The wrecksite of the target boat S-35, was located off Oahu, by the Lost 52 Project, in 2017, not far from S-28.

13 submarines

In commission when the Japanese surrendered, on 2 September 1945. All except one, S-15, were decommissioned by the end of November 1945. S-15 was decommissioned in June 1946.

== General characteristics ==
=== Group I ===
1st Electric Boat (aka Holland) design

- Displacement: 854 long tons (868 t) surfaced; 1,062 long tons (1,079 t) submerged
- Length: 219 ft 3 in (66.8 m)
- Beam: 20 ft 8 in (6.3 m)
- Draft: 15 ft 11 in (4.9 m)
- Propulsion & power: 2 × New London Ship and Engine Company (NELSECO) diesel engines, 600 bhp (447 kW) each; 2 × Electro-Dynamic (S-1, S-30-S-35), Ridgway (S-18, S-20 through S-29), or General Electric (S-36 through S-41) electric motors, 750 hp (559 kW) each; 2 × 60-cell Exide batteries; 2 × propellers
- Bunkerage: 41,182 US gal (155,890 L; 34,291 imp gal) fuel oil
- Speed: 14.5 kn (26.9 km/h; 16.7 mph) surfaced; 11 kn (20 km/h; 13 mph) submerged
- Range: 5,000 nmi (9,300 km; 5,800 mi) at 10 kn (19 km/h; 12 mph) surfaced
- Test depth: 200 ft (61 m)
- Armament (as built): 4 × 21 inch (533 mm) torpedo tubes (bow), 12 torpedoes;
  1 × 4 in (102 mm)/50 caliber deck gun
- Crew: 38 (later 42) officers and men
- Boats in Group: S-1, S-18 through S-41

=== Group II ===
1st Navy (aka Government) design

- Displacement: 875 long tons (889 t) surfaced; 1,088 long tons (1,105 t) submerged
- Length: 231 ft (70.4 m)
- Beam: 21 ft 10 in (6.7 m)
- Draft: 13 ft 4 in (4.1 m)
- Propulsion & power: 2 × MAN (S-3 through S-13) or Busch-Sulzer (S-14 through S-17) diesel engines, 700 bhp (520 kW) each; 2 × Westinghouse Electric electric motors, 600 hp each; 1 × 120-cell Exide battery; 2 × propellers
- Speed: 15 kn (28 km/h; 17 mph) surfaced; 11 kn submerged
- Bunkerage: 36,950 US gal (139,900 L; 30,770 imp gal) fuel oil
- Range: 5,000 nmi at 10 kn surfaced
- Test depth: 200 ft
- Armament (as built): 4 × 21 in torpedo tubes (bow), 12 torpedoes (S-3 through S-9); 4 × 21 in torpedo tubes (bow), 1 × 21 in torpedo tubes (stern), 14 torpedoes (S-10 through S-13);
  1 × 4 inch (102 mm)/50 caliber deck gun
- Crew: 38 (later 42) officers and men
- Boats in Group: S-3 through S-17

=== Group III ===
2nd Electric Boat (aka Modified Holland) design

- Displacement: 906 long tons (921 t) surfaced; 1,126 long tons (1,144 t) submerged
- Length: 216 ft (65.8 m), 225 ft 3 in (68.7 m) overall
- Beam: 20 ft 9 in (6.3 m)
- Draft: 16 ft (4.9 m)
- Propulsion & power: 2 × NELSECO diesels, 600 hp (448 kW) each; 2 × Electro-Dynamic electric motors, 750 hp each; 1 × 120 cell Exide battery; 2 × propellers
- Speed: 15 knots (28& km/h) surfaced; 11 knots (20 km/h) submerged
- Bunkerage: 185 tons oil fuel
- Range: 5000 nmi at 10 kn surfaced
- Test depth: 200 ft (61 m)
- Armament (as built): 4 × 21 in torpedo tubes (bow), 12 torpedoes;
  1 × 4 in/50 cal deck gun
- Crew: 38 (later 42) officers and men
- Boats in Group: S-42 through S-47

=== Group IV ===
2nd Navy (aka Modified Navy) design

- Displacement: 903 long tons (917 t) surfaced; 1,230 long tons (1,250 t) submerged
- Length: 240 ft (73.2 m), 266 ft (81.1 m) overall
- Beam: 21 ft 11 in (6.7 m)
- Draft: 13 ft 6 in (4.1 m)
- Propulsion & power: 2 × Busch-Sulzer diesel engines, 900 bhp (670 kW) each; 2 × Ridgway electric motors, 750 hp each; 1 × 120 cell Exide battery; 2 × propellers
- Bunkerage: 177 tons oil fuel
- Speed: 14.5 knots surfaced; 11 knots submerged
- Range: 8,000 nmi (15,000 km; 9,200 mi) at 10 kn (19 km/h; 12 mph) surfaced
- Depth: 200 ft
- Armament (as built): 4 × 21 in torpedo tubes (bow), 1 × 21 in torpedo tubes (stern), 14 torpedoes(S-10 through S-13);
  1 × 4 inch (102 mm)/50 caliber deck gun
- Crew: 38 (later 45) officers and men
- Boats in Group: S-48 through S-51

=== S-2 ===
Lake Torpedo Boat Company design

- Displacement: 800 long tons (810 t) surfaced; 977 long tons (993 t) submerged
- Length: 207 ft (63.1 m) overall
- Beam: 19 ft 7 in (6.0 m)
- Draft: 16 feet 2 inches (4.9 m)
- Propulsion & power: 2 × Busch-Sulzer diesel engines, 900 hp each; 2 × Diehl Manufacture Company electric motors, 750 hp each; 2 × propellers
- Speed: 15 knots surfaced; 11 knots submerged
- Range: 8000 nmi at 10 kn surfaced
- Depth: 200 ft
- Armament (as built): 4 × 21 in torpedo tubes (bow), 12 torpedoes;
  1 × 4 in/50 cal deck gun
- Crew: 38 officers and men

== See also ==
- Allied submarines in the Pacific War
- Unrestricted submarine warfare
- List of submarine classes of the United States Navy
- List of lost United States submarines

== Bibliography ==
- Friedman, Norman (1995). U.S. Submarines Through 1945: An Illustrated Design History. Annapolis, Maryland: Naval Institute Press. ISBN 1-55750-263-3.
- Johnston, David (December 2020). "The Devil in the Details: An Analysis of S-class Submarine Construction 1917-1925" (PDF). The Submarine Review.
- Lenton, H. T. (1973). American Submarines (Navies of the Second World War). Doubleday. ISBN 9780356041902.
- Johnston, David L. (October 2025). "A VISUAL GUIDE TO THE S-CLASS SUBMARINES 1918-1945 PART 1: CONCEPT DEVELOPMENT" (PDF) (5th ed.).
- Silverstone, Paul H. (1970). U.S. Warships of World War I. Ian Allan. ISBN 9780711000957.
- Duncan, Francis (2012). Rickover: The Struggle for Excellence. Naval Institute Press. ISBN 978-1591142218.
- Priolo, Gary. "S-4 (SS-109)".
- Priolo, Gary. "S-5 (SS-110)".
- Mohl, Michael. "S-48 (SS-159)".
- Priolo, Gary. "S-51 (SS-162)".
- Priolo, Gary. "S-26 (SS-131)".
- Priolo, Gary. "S-27 (SS-132)".
- Priolo, Gary. "S-28 (SS-133)".
- Priolo, Gary. "S-36 (SS-141)".
- Priolo, Gary. "S-39 (SS-144)".
- Priolo, Gary. "S-44 (SS-155)".
- Priolo, Gary. "S-49 (SS-160)".
- Campbell, John (1985). Naval Weapons of World War Two. Naval Institute Press. ISBN 0-87021-459-4.
- Gardiner, Robert (1985). Conway's All the World's Fighting Ships 1906-1921. London: Conway Maritime Press. ISBN 0-85177-245-5.
