= USS Arcata (PC-601) =

History

United States
- Name: PC-601; Arcata
- Builder: Consolidated Shipbuilding Company, Morris Heights, New York
- Laid down: 17 March 1942
- Launched: 23 May 1942
- Commissioned: 1 September 1942
- Decommissioned: 27 July 1946
- Stricken: July 1960
- Identification: Hull number: PC-601
- Fate: Sold, fate unknown.

General characteristics
- Class & type: PC-461-class submarine chaser
- Displacement: 450 short tons (410 tonnes)
- Length: 173 ft 8 in (52.93 m)
- Beam: 23 ft 0 in (7.01 m)
- Draft: 10 ft 10 in (3.30 m)
- Propulsion: Two 1,440 bhp (1,070 kW) Fairbanks-Morse 38D8-1/8 diesel engines, Westinghouse reduction gear, 2,880 bhp (2,150 kW) total
- Speed: 20.2 knots (37.4 km/h; 23.2 mph)
- Complement: 65 officers and enlisted
- Armament: 1 × 3 in (76 mm)/50 gun, 1 × 40 mm gun, 3 × 20 mm guns, 2 × rocket launchers, 4 × depth charge projectors, 2 × depth charge tracks

USS Arcata (PC-601) was a United States Navy PC-461-class submarine chaser named for Arcata, California; the second Navy ship to carry the name.

== Construction and career ==
The hull of PC-601 was laid down on 17 March 1942 at Morris Heights, New York, by the Consolidated Shipbuilding Corporation. The ship was launched on 23 May 1942, sponsored by Mrs. Junius S. Morgan. The submarine chaser was commissioned on 1 September 1942, Lt. G. D. Tammers, USNR, in command.

The subchaser conducted shakedown training along the east coast of the United States in September and October and, in November, reported for duty with the West Sea Frontier. By the spring of 1943, she had begun to escort ships among bases on the Alaskan coast and in the Aleutian Islands.

A year later, early in April 1944, the ship proceeded to Seattle for two months of duty before continuing south to San Francisco where she served until late September. At that time, the subchaser moved west to Pearl Harbor, Hawaii Territory. Early in October, she headed for Eniwetok in the Marshall Islands. Upon her arrival there, PC-601 began escorting convoys between American bases in the Marshalls, the Marianas, and the Carolines. She remained so occupied through the end of World War II and into the fall of 1945. After returning to the west coast of the United States via Pearl Harbor in the spring of 1946, PC-601 was placed out of commission at Astoria, Oregon, on 27 July 1946. Berthed with the Columbia River Group, Pacific Reserve Fleet, she remained inactive for the rest of her career. In February 1956, she was named Arcata. Her name was struck from the Navy list in July 1960, and she was sold in April 1961.
