= USS Yacona (SP-617) =

Patrol vessel of the United States Navy

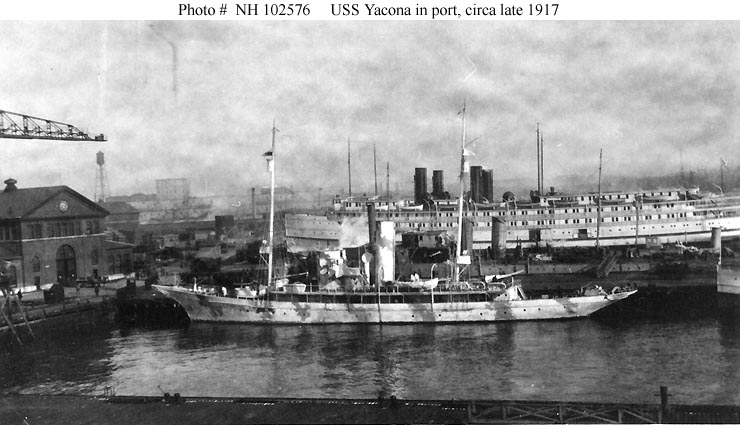
- USS Yacona (SP-617) (foreground) at the Boston Navy Yard in Boston, Massachusetts, ca. December 1917.

History
- Name: 1898-1899 Yacona; 1899-1901 Amélia; 1902-1917 Yacona
- Owner: 1898-1899 Walter S Bailey, UK; 1899-1901 Don Carlos, King of Portugal; 1902-1917 Henry Clay Pierce, USA
- Builder: John Scott and Company, Kinghorn, Scotland
- Yard number: 102
- Launched: 18 July 1898
- Completed: 9 August 1898
- Fate: Sold to US Navy, 29 September 1917

History

United States
- Name: USS Yacona
- Namesake: Previous name retained
- Acquired: 29 September 1917
- Commissioned: 10 December 1917
- Decommissioned: 17 July 1921
- Fate: Transferred to the Philippines 17 July 1921

History

Philippines
- Name: Apo
- Owner: Insular Government of the Philippine Islands
- Acquired: 17 July 1921
- Fate: Returned to the USA in 1932

General characteristics 1918
- Tonnage: 527 GRT
- Length: 211 ft 0 in (64.31 m)
- Beam: 27 ft 3 in (8.31 m)
- Draft: 13 ft 9 in (4.19 m)
- Depth of hold: 15 ft 9 in (4.80 m)
- Speed: 12.5 knots (23.2 km/h; 14.4 mph)
- Complement: 67
- Armament: 2 × 3-inch (76 mm) guns; 2 × .30 caliber Colt machine guns; 10 × Mark I depth charges

The auxiliary patrol vessel USS Yacona (SP-617) was built in 1898 in Scotland as a civilian steam yacht of the same name. (Note: DANFS and some other American sources have her original name erroneously as Cem, then Amélia and only later becoming Yacona) Later, she was renamed Amélia as a survey yacht of the King of Portugal, before reverting to Yacona in 1901. She was acquired by the U.S. Navy in September 1917 and served until 1919 as a patrol vessel in the western Atlantic. In 1921 she was transferred to the Philippines as the governmental yacht Apo, serving until 1932.

== Private yacht ==
Yacona was built as a private yacht of that name in 1898 by John Scott and Company at their Abden Shipyard, Kinghorn, on the Firth of Forth, Scotland for Walter S Bailey of Kingston upon Hull, Yorkshire. She was a three-masted schooner-rigged steam yacht with a steel hull, measured at 527 GRT and 635 tons Thames Measurement. Her length overall was 188.6 ft (57.5 m), with a beam of 27.2 ft (8.3 m) and depth of 13.8 ft (4.2 m). Her single propeller was powered by a 900 ihp triple expansion steam engine also made by Scott, at their engine works at Kirkcaldy.

Bailey was a prominent Hull shipowner, through Bailey & Leetham Ltd, and commodore of the Royal Yorkshire Yacht Club. On 18 July 1898 Scott's Yard number 102 was named Yacona and launched, as was their custom, with "steam up", departing immediately to Burntisland to prepare for sea trials. The final acceptance trials were held on 9 August 1898, when a maximum speed over the measured mile of 14 knots (26 km/h; 16 mph) was achieved, though her regular service speed was 12.5 knots (23.2 km/h; 14.4 mph). She arrived in Hull the following day, after 17 hours steaming.

The yacht was not kept by Bailey for long, as he sold her in April 1899 to D. Carlos, King of Portugal for the latest of his oceanographic cruises, pursuing his interest in marine science and navigation. As with the other three yachts acquired for similar purposes in other years, the King renamed the new Royal Yacht Amélia. In 1901, when he purchased his fourth Amélia, the King sold her predecessor to British yacht broker Gustavus Pratt who reverted her to the name Yacona, and sold her the following year to Henry Clay Pierce of St. Louis, Missouri. He was the wealthy president of St. Louis-based petroleum products distributor Waters-Pierce Oil Company, an associate of Standard Oil.

== USS Yacona ==
=== World War I ===
The United States Navy acquired the yacht at New York City on 29 September 1917, inspecting her at Shewan Shipyard. On the same day (10 October) that that yard estimated that the alterations necessary to fit the ship out as an armed patrol vessel could be completed by 1 November, the Navy ordered her to proceed to Boston where the previous owner's own workmen could remove the pleasure craft's interior woodwork. Yacona got underway on 12 October from the Shewan yard, but grounded in the channel at New York's Hell Gate. Taken to the New York Navy Yard for minor repairs, the ship ultimately made the shift to her original destination (Boston), and fitted out at the Boston Navy Yard. Assigned the designation SP-617 and regarded as "one of the strongest and best built vessels of her size…that will make a most serviceable vessel", Yacona was commissioned on 10 December 1917.

Yacona put to sea early on 20 December 1917 and anchored off Provincetown, Massachusetts, later that day. The next day, she test-fired her main battery, firing four rounds from each 3-inch gun and 50 rounds from each Colt machine gun, and "found same to be in good working order". The converted yacht returned to the New York Navy Yard three days before Christmas, and remained there into February 1918, a period punctuated by one brief interval underway, when the ship got underway, assisted by tug Mariner, to proceed to the waters off Tompkinsville where she anchored overnight (29 to 30 January 1918).

Yacona departed the New York Navy Yard shortly before the end of the forenoon watch on 6 February 1918 in company with Mariner and the converted yacht Wadena, bound for New London, Connecticut. The ships proceeded through increasingly heavy ice floes that impeded their progress the following day as they neared their destination, Yacona having to take Wadena in tow at one point when ice damage compelled Mariner—which had twice extricated Wadena from the floes—to stop to effect temporary repairs. Eventually, by maneuvering at various courses and speeds, Yacona managed to push through the ice and reach her destination, dropping anchor late in the first watch on 7 February. She got underway from New London on 22 February, then passed up Narragansett Bay, and reached the U.S. Naval Coaling Station, Melville, Rhode Island, that afternoon. Pausing briefly at Newport, the next day, she then cast off from alongside Wadena and put to sea, bound for Bermuda during the morning watch on 24 February.

Yacona, steaming in company with Wadena, Mariner, and the tug Lykens, then rendezvoused with a convoy of eleven submarine chasers soon thereafter; the French tug Mohican brought up the rear. As the convoy worked its way down the eastern seaboard, however, it encountered a heavy southwesterly gale that sprang up on 26 February 1918. A half-hour before the end of the forenoon watch, heavy seas carried away part of the bulwarks on the starboard bow, and smashed in the ports on the starboard side of Yacona's deck house, flooding her pay office and radio room. Later that day, the ship developed a leak that inundated some of her bunker spaces and flooded the fireroom to a depth of one foot. Heavy seas pounded her smaller consort Mariner, too, opening her seams. After that tug's pumps failed, rising water put out her boiler fires; powerless, she had to be abandoned, Wadena rescuing her entire crew. Yacona reduced speed in the gale, and the next day took submarine chaser SC-256 in tow. Yacona's quartermaster noted that during the afternoon watch on 27 February, the task of removing water from the fireroom bilges occupied all hands.

Reaching Bermuda on 1 March 1918, Yacona, whose crew discovered hundreds of pounds of water-damaged rations ranging from staples like sugar and flour to potatoes and pork sausage that had to be disposed-of as the result of the storm, remained there into April, undergoing needed voyage repairs. She sailed on the morning of 8 April 1918 to escort a convoy that consisted of two U.S. Army tugs, Cadmus and Seminole, the tanker Chestnut Hill, the destroyer tender Leonidas, and submarine chasers SC-143, SC-147, SC-179, SC-227, SC-338, and SC-95. En route to the Azores, Yacona conducted gunnery and general quarters drills and made part of the passage under sail to conserve coal. She and her convoy stood in to Ponta Delgada on the morning of 22 April; the yacht moored alongside the Russian bark Montrosa. After coaling ship, Yacona headed for Bermuda on 4 May, in company with Wadena and the fuel ship Arethusa, and made port at Hamilton ten days later.

Yacona made one more round-trip voyage to the Azores and back, escorting a group of six submarine chasers, the cruiser Salem and the Naval Overseas Transportation Service tanker John M. Connelly eastbound and returning westbound in company with old consort Wadena and the tugs Arctic, Goliah, and Undaunted on 20 June 1918. After engine repairs at the British dockyard there and having her hull painted, she departed Bermuda on 9 July in company with the minesweeper Comber and the tug Mojave and headed for New London, with U.S. Vice Consul to Switzerland Louis Lombard and his son embarked for transportation "to [the] next port…”

Yacona reached New London on the afternoon of 12 July 1918 and disembarked her passengers. She then spent the next several weeks undergoing voyage repairs, first at the New York Navy Yard, from 19 to 25 July, and then at Tietjen and Lang's Dockyard, Hoboken, New Jersey, from 25 July to 27 August. She shifted to New London (28–30 August), then sailed for Charleston, South Carolina. One day out of New London, she went to general quarters early in the mid watch on 31 August and trained her guns on a "suspicious object". The dark shape, however, quickly disappeared from sight in the thick haze and the ship's own smoke. Then, after voyage repairs at Charleston (2–6 August), she put to sea as escort for a convoy of three 110-foot (34 m) submarine chasers assigned to the French Navy: SC-365, SC-366, and SC-367. Reaching Bermuda on 10 September, she sailed five days later for the Azores in company with cruiser Chicago and tugs Arctic and Goliah and a covey of submarine chasers, and arrived at her destination on 27 September. As the converted yacht prepared to sail from Ponta Delgada on 2 October, however, her port anchor fouled the mooring gear. To "expedite matters and join the convoy" then sailing for Hamilton, she slipped the anchor and 15 fathoms (90 ft; 27 m) of chain. Less thand a half-hour into the first dog watch on 9 October, while steaming in company with Chicago, Arethusa, Goliah, Arctic and Undaunted, the yacht spotted another "suspicious object" on the surface and went to general quarters. She commenced firing three minutes later but, after identifying her target as a drifting buoy, ceased fire.

Yacona arrived back at St. George's Harbour, Bermuda, on 12 October 1918; departed those waters on 5 November, bound for New York. Making the initial leg of the voyage in company with the tug Iroquois and her tow, the freighter Seguranca, the yacht arrived at the New York Navy Yard on 11 November 1918, the day that the armistice ended World War I.

=== Post-war service ===
Yacona was next attached to Division 3, Battleship Force 1, United States Atlantic Fleet, Yacona departed Boston on 10 December 1918, transited the Cape Cod Canal on 11 December, and anchored off the mouth of the York River on 13 December on account of heavy fog. The following day, she shifted her anchorage upriver and, on 15 December, briefly embarked Rear Admiral Thomas Washington, commander of the battleship division to which the ship had been attached, when he came on board from his flagship, Rhode Island. After moving to Hampton Roads the day after Christmas of 1918, Yacona sailed for New York in company with converted yacht Aramis. The two ships arrived off Tompkinsville on 13 January 1919. Yacona then got underway for New London two days later, arriving there on 16 January.

Placed in the Reserve Squadron, Antisubmarine Squadron in Training, in January 1919, Yacona remained at New London into June, principally in a succession of berths alongside the State Pier there. She departed New London on 13 June and arrived at the New York Navy Yard on 16 June to unload her ammunition and have her guns removed. On 26 June 1919, the converted yacht was decommissioned and placed in reserve at the New York Navy Yard. On 22 April 1920, the Navy decided to sell the vessel but, on 14 September, cancelled the sale order.

Taken out of reserve and recommissioned on 11 October 1920, Yacona remained at the navy yard into February 1921, being cleaned and painted preparatory to a voyage to the Far East. Upon completion of her overhaul, she departed New York on 1 March and proceeded to Bermuda, utilizing sails for part of the passage to conserve coal. After calling at Hamilton from 5 to 14 March, Yacona pressed on across the Atlantic, visiting Ponta Delgada from 24 to 29 March and reaching Gibraltar on 3 April. She remained at that British bastion for almost a month, weighing anchor on the 28th and heading for Malta on the next leg of her passage to the Orient. While at Malta from 3 to 8 May, Yacona full-dressed ship in honor of the anniversary of the accession of King George V to the throne of England and, along with all other ships and batteries in the harbor, fired a 21-gun national salute at noon on 6 May to celebrate the event. Yacona stood out of Grand Harbour, Valletta, on 8 May 1921, bound for Egypt.

After provisioning at Port Said on 12 May, Yacona transited the Suez Canal the next day and proceeded to Aden arriving a week later, on 20 May. There, Yacona took on fresh water and coal, and sailed during the first watch the same day. However, a board of investigation convened during the mid watch on 21 May determined that the quantity of coal she had received had proved to be of inferior quality, and she put back into Aden soon thereafter, where LT George M. Snead (SC), Yacona's supply officer went ashore to confer with representatives of Cory Brothers. A representative of Cory Brothers visited the ship shortly after LT Snead returned, remaining on board for only a quarter of an hour, long enough, apparently, to confirm the Americans' complaint. She shifted berths the following day and a tug brought two lighters alongside for the laborious and dirty task of un-coaling ship, a process that lasted from the afternoon watch on 22 May to the forenoon watch the following day – the bad coal was later taken out to sea and dumped.

Yacona resumed her eastward voyage on 23 May and arrived at Bombay, India, on 1 June. There, she coaled and once again dressed-ship, this time for the King's Birthday on 3 June. The ship departed that port the next day. After calling at Colombo, Ceylon, from 9 to 24 June and at Singapore from 3 to 7 July, where she "full-dressed ship in honor of American independence" on 4 July, Yacona stood into Manila Bay on 14 July, assisted to her berth in Cavite harbor by the tug Tamarao, her voyage from the eastern seaboard of the United States completed.

Shifting from Cavite to the Coast Guard Dock, Engineer Island, Manila, on the morning of 16 July 1921, Yacona was decommissioned on 27 July 1921 and turned over to representatives of the Insular Government of the Philippine Islands.

== Philippines Government ==
On transfer to the Philippines as a yacht for use of the Governor-General, Yacona was renamed Apo. She was used principally for inspection voyages within the Philippines. In 1932 the yacht was returned to the United States Government and not replaced until 1936.
