= USS Wadena =

Patrol vessel of the United States Navy

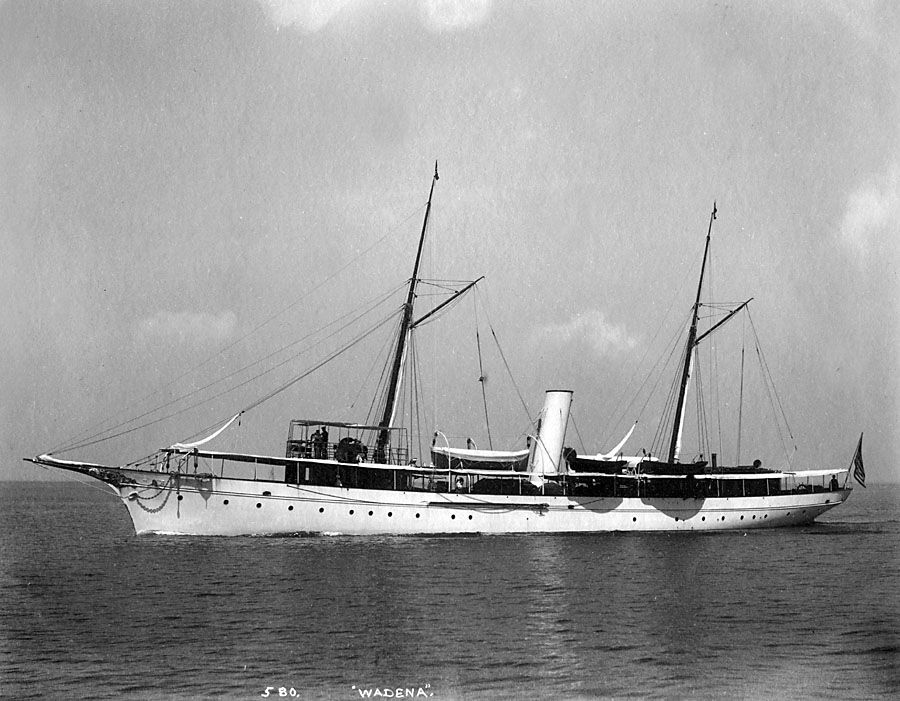
- Wadena, the yacht of J. H. Wade II, is seen underway on 15 July 1897. Wadena was converted to a patrol boat for the United States Navy during World War I

History

United States
- Name: Wadena
- Owner: Jeptha Homer Wade II
- Builder: Cleveland Shipbuilding Company; Cleveland, Ohio
- Cost: $250,000–300,000
- Yard number: 13
- Launched: 1891
- Identification: U.S. Official Number: 81346

United States
- Name: USS Wadena (SP-158)
- Acquired: 25 May 1917
- Commissioned: 14 January 1918
- Stricken: 24 April 1919
- Decommissioned: 19 May 1919
- Fate: Abandoned and scrapped 1931

General characteristics
- Tonnage: 246 t.
- Length: 176 ft (54 m)
- Beam: 20 ft 10 in (6.35 m)
- Draft: 10 ft 6 in (3.20 m)
- Propulsion: triple expansion steam engine
- Sail plan: schooner rig
- Speed: 13 knots (24 km/h; 15 mph)
- Complement: 66
- Armament: 2 × 3" guns; 2 × .30-caliber Colt machine guns; 10 Mk. I depth charges

USS Wadena (SP-158) was a converted yacht patrol vessel of the United States Navy during World War I. She was built in 1891 in Cleveland, Ohio, as a steam yacht for Jeptha Homer Wade II of Cleveland and New York City. During her Navy career, Wadena made several trips escorting submarine chasers across the Atlantic Ocean, and, later, patrolling in the Atlantic and Mediterranean. on 26 February 1918 Wadena came to the aid of sinking tug Mariner and rescued all of her crew.

During her career as Wade's personal yacht, she sailed to the Far East in 1895, calling at ports in Japan and China. After the yacht had rescued a Japanese boat in distress, Emperor Meiji attempted to purchase Wadena. Although Wade declined the offers, the ship, after moving on to visit ports in China, was detained for several hours under suspicion of being a Japanese vessel.

Wadena was sold several times after her Navy career ended in 1919, eventually being abandoned and scrapped in 1931.

== Yacht of J. H. Wade ==
Wadena was a steel-hulled yacht built in 1891 as the personal yacht for Jeptha Home Wade II by the Cleveland Shipbuilding Company of Cleveland, Ohio. Wade was the grandson of Jeptha Home Wade, the founder of Western Union Telegraph. Wadena was outfitted with a triple expansion steam engine and was also rigged as a schooner for traveling under sail. The steel of her hull ranged from ¼- to ½-inch thickness (6 to 13 mm) and was applied to a steel frame, and her steel decks were covered with wood. The ship was painted white with teak trimming and featured a gilded mermaid as a figurehead at her prow.

=== Appointments ===
The ship was fitted with six watertight compartments and ballast tanks capable of holding 18 short tons (16 t) of water. Wadena was the first yacht on the Great Lakes to be equipped with Coston night signal lights. The yacht carried a crew of 26 officers and men and carried four boats including a steam launch and a metal lifeboat

Wadena was equipped with machinery to distill up to 1,200 US gallons (4,500 L; 1,000 imp gal) of fresh water daily, and a refrigeration system that was capable of producing 3,000 pounds (1,400 kg) of ice daily in addition to chilling food storage areas. The same system also served as both a cooling and a heating system for the ship. The yacht also boasted all-electric lighting from 135 lamps of 16 candlepower (cp) (15½ candela (cd)) and a searchlight of 2,000 cp (1,950 cd).

The chartroom, paneled in mahogany and featuring plate glass windows and a settee, served as a lounge or smoking room in mild weather. A curved mahogany staircase led down to the library, which was well-stocked with books and finished in white mahogany with salmon tapestry adorned with roses. Over a hidden writing desk—revealed at the touch of a button—was carved the aphorism "The sea and air are common to all men". The library was illuminated by natural light from a ground glass dome and six portholes, but was also equipped with six electric lights.

On the port side of the library was the room of Wade's personal physician, Dr. Powell, who accompanied the family on their trips overseas. On the starboard side were rooms for Wade's children. The room for his two sons featured white mahogany and blue tapestry, while the room for his daughter, white mahogany and rose tapestry. Near the daughter's room was the gun case, containing a mix of revolvers, shotguns, rifles, and cutlasses, which were thought to come in handy during visits to the South Seas.

Wade's stateroom had elaborately carved mahogany, a double bed, a closet, moveable reading desk, and a porcelain-lined bathtub with hot and cold running water. The table in the dining room seated eight and was furnished in polished red mahogany. The dining room also featured a wine closet, a butler's pantry and a dumb waiter to the galley below. The main saloon held a piano festooned with Cupids blowing on pipes.

=== Travels ===
After outfitting and trials were completed in November 1891, Wadena traveled from Cleveland and up through the Saint Lawrence Seaway and around to Boston and New York. From there she sailed in January 1892 to the Bahamas and on to meet her owner and family in Sicily. In April, rumors that asserted Wadena had sunk in the Mediterranean, perhaps fueled by the how low the boat sat in the water, were dispelled in the American press. The family was accompanied on this initial trip by Wade's mother-in-law, and by his brother-in-law George A. Garretson, a West Point graduate who would later serve as a general in the Spanish–American War.

From June 1894 to June 1895, Wadena was on an extended tour to the Far East with the Wade family. While the family traveled via rail to San Francisco and thence to Yokohama, Japan, via a Pacific Mail steamer, Wadena traveled alone to meet them. The yacht steamed east from New York on 16 June 1894 for Malta via Gibraltar. She arrived at the latter port 17 days later, having burned 100 tons of coal en route. From Malta, Wadena re-coaled at La Valette, and then proceeded through the Suez Canal and on eastward to meet the family at Yokohama.

The family called at many ports in Japan and China during their leisurely expedition aboard Wadena. Off the coast of Japan, the yacht rescued a bark in distress, towing it into port. After this, Japanese Emperor Meiji attempted to purchase the Wade's yacht, intending to convert it into a dispatch boat, but the family did not part with their craft. Another sojourn—this one in China's Yangtze River—brought a detention by officials who thought the boat a Japanese vessel in disguise. The yacht was released unharmed after four hours.

After tiring of the Far East, the family retraced Wadena's eastward course, arriving in Naples in late May. From there the family departed their yacht in order to board the American steamer St. Louis for its inaugural westbound transatlantic crossing from Southampton on 15 June 1895. The captain and crew of Wadena sailed her back across the Atlantic with orders to prepare her for racing season, and arrived at New York on 16 June 1895, a year to the day she departed.

In on 6 August 1895, Wadena rammed fishing boat Clara Edena of Vineyard Haven, Massachusetts, 2 miles (3.2 km) west of Tarpaulin Cove, causing severe damage to the fishing boat. Wadena was not significantly damaged in the collision.

== U.S. Navy patrol craft ==
In the spring of 1917, the Navy inspected Wadena and acquired her from Wade, of Cleveland, who delivered the ship to the 3d Naval District on 25 May 1917. Designated SP-158, Wadena fitted out at the New York Navy Yard for "distant service" and was commissioned on 14 January 1918.

In company with converted yacht Yacona and tug Mariner, Wadena got underway a half-hour before the end of the forenoon watch on 6 February 1918, for New London, Connecticut. The little convoy encountered ice floes the next day; Mariner towed Wadena on two occasions, the tug having to stop and repair her ice-damaged bow on the second occasion, necessitating Yacona's towing Wadena for a time. Anchoring off New London at the outset, the yacht shifted berths to the Central Vermont Railroad Pier, where she remained until steaming to Newport, Rhode Island, on 22 February. She then coaled from a barge at the coaling station at Melville, Rhode Island, Wadena's crew having to transfer the dusty and dusky fuel into their ship by hand-shovels.

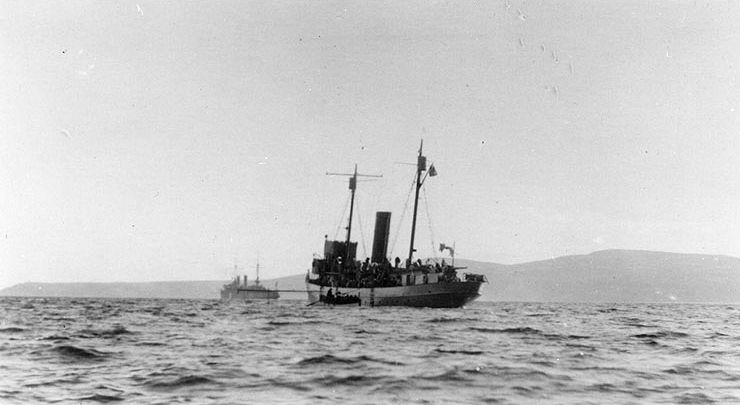
USS Wadena (SP-158) at anchor in either the Azores or Bermuda, c. 1918. The ship in the left distance is probably a Royal Navy cruiser.

Wadena got underway from Newport, bound for Bermuda, on 24 February 1918 in company with Yacona and Mariner, and the tug Lykens. The four ships then rendezvoused with eleven 110-foot submarine chasers soon thereafter. The French tug Mohican accompanied the group, bringing up the rear. As the convoy worked its way down the eastern seaboard, however, Mariner fell progressively astern. She briefly towed the submarine chaser SC-177 before the tug began to founder in a heavy southwesterly gale that sprang up on 26 February. Mariner hoisted the breakdown flag shortly before the end of the forenoon watch and cast loose SC-177. Soon thereafter, at the start of the afternoon watch, Mariner, her seams opened by the pounding sea, her pumps inoperative, and boiler fires put out by the rising water in her engineering spaces, signaled: "We are sinking fast". Wadena stood by to render assistance, her quartermaster noting that the sea was "very rough and running high." After embarking two increments of the doomed tug's crew from life rafts, Wadena sprayed oil on the water to calm the seas, and then brought on board the rest of Mariner's entire complement from three rafts, the last, its occupants having abandoned the tug, decks awash, reaching the yacht's side a half hour before the end of the first dog watch with Lt. (jg.) Martin Miller, Mariner's commanding officer, on board. Later, while the rest of the convoy continued on its passage and Mariner, abandoned, drifted off to sink by day's end, Wadena retrieved SC-177 and ultimately reached the British naval station at Hamilton, Bermuda, on 1 March.

Wadena returned to the east coast of the United States soon thereafter, reaching Charleston, South Carolina, on 10 March 1918. She remained there until 25 March, when she escorted another convoy of submarine chasers to Bermuda, arriving there on 29 March. Assigned to the "special task force" to safeguard the transatlantic passage of submarine chasers slated to operate in European waters, Wadena sailed for the Azores on 15 April in company with seven submarine chasers, the U.S. Army tug Knickerbocker, and the tug Lykens. Making most of the passage under sail, Wadena reached Ponta Delgada, Azores, on 27 April. In company with Yacona and the fuel ship Arethusa, Wadena then sailed for Bermuda on 4 May and reached the British admiralty dockyard there 10 days later. While at Bermuda, she was drydocked for repairs and the application of anticorrosive (Italian Venecium Moravia red) and antifouling (Italian Venecium Moravia gray) paint to her hull. Underway again on 25 May, Wadena sailed for the Azores and returned to Bermuda in company with old consort Yacona and a trio of tugs, Undaunted, Goliah, and Arctic, on 20 June.

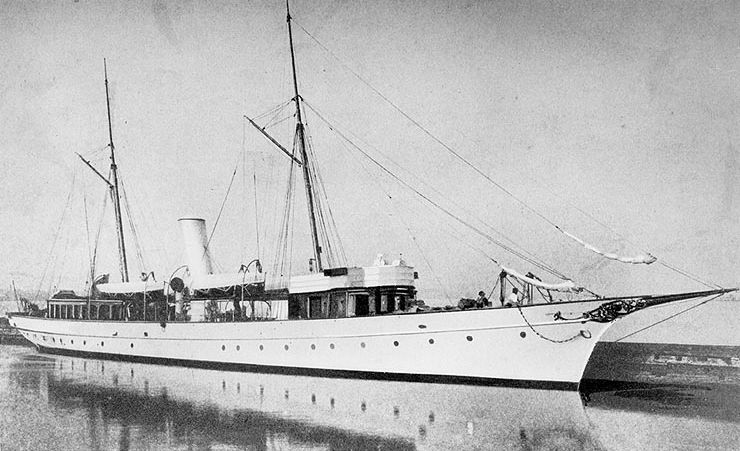
Wadena is seen as she appeared shortly before her U.S. Navy service in World War I.

After subsequently taking part in another transatlantic movement of submarine chasers from Bermuda to Europe, Wadena continued on via Ponta Delgada to Gibraltar in a truly allied assemblage, in company with the Italian Navy fuel ship Bronte and three French submarine chasers. Reaching Gibraltar on 31 July 1918, the yacht operated with the U.S. Patrol Squadrons based at that port into the autumn. She performed patrol and escort duties between Gibraltar and Funchal, Madeira; Ponta Delgada and the Canary Islands; and Tangiers and Safi, Morocco. On occasion, she also transported mail and people. After escorting the Naval Overseas Transportation Service cargo vessel Mount Shasta from Ponta Delgada to Gibraltar between 16 and 21 October, Wadena remained at Gibraltar into the second week of November 1918. An hour into the afternoon watch on 11 November, her quartermaster recorded: "At 1:00 (pm) received word that Germany had signed the armistice and that hostilities had ceased at 11:00 a.m."

While the ship lay at Gibraltar, she was inspected by Rear Admiral Albert P. Niblack, Commander, Squadron 2, Patrol Force. Eventually getting underway on 11 December 1918 to return to the United States, she made part of the passage in company with gunboats Sacramento, Paducah, and the Coast Guard cutter Manning. Wadena employed her sails for most of the passage, sailing via Ponta Delgada and Bermuda, and reached New London in company with Manning on 3 January 1919.

Placed in reserve, Wadena remained at New London into the spring of 1919. Although stricken from the Navy Register on 24 April 1919, she remained in commission. As squadron flagship, she departed New London on 5 May 1919, bound for the New York Navy Yard, reaching there the following day in company with converted yachts Wanderer, Corona, Christabel, and Emeline. Later that day, the process of removing her guns and other Navy equipment began. After shifting to the Marine Basin at Brooklyn a week later, Wadena was decommissioned on the afternoon of 19 May 1919.

Offered for sale by the Navy, the ship was awarded to Morris Levinson who paid and received title to Wadena on 3 September 1919. On 8 September 1919, the Navy Department discovered a higher bid from S. H. Johnson of New York City had been received and misfiled, and attempted to rescind the transaction with Levinson by refusing to deliver the yacht to which he held title. Johnson filed suit, with the Navy Department joining as a stakeholder, but the U.S. district court ruled in favor of Levinson. Johnson then appealed to the U.S. court of appeals who threw the Navy out of the suit and reversed the finding, awarding the boat to Johnson. Levinson then appealed to the Supreme Court which, in the case Levinson v. United States, restored the decision of the district court, awarding the boat to Levinson.

== Later career ==
Little is known of Wadena's final years other than she changed hands at least twice more. The yacht was purchased in 1921 by the Aeromarine Plane and Motor Co. of New York, who in turn, sold the ship later in 1921 to Aeromarine Engineering Sales Co. of Keyport, New Jersey. The ship was abandoned and scrapped in 1931.
