= Edwin Anderson Jr. =

US Navy officer and Medal of Honor recipient (1878–1933)

Edwin Alexander Anderson Jr.
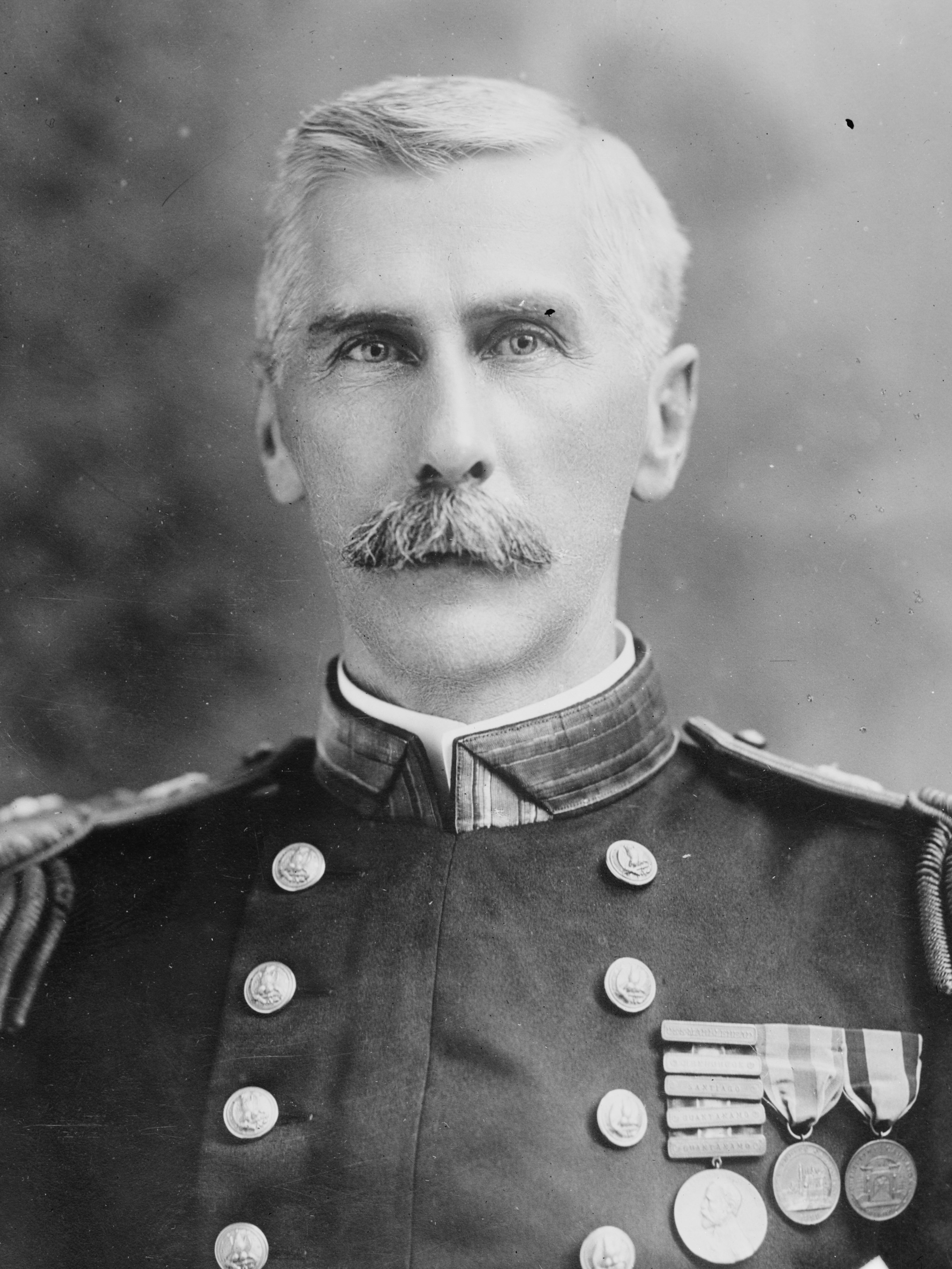
- Born: 16 July 1860; Wilmington, North Carolina, U.S.
- Died: 23 September 1933 (aged 73); Masonboro Sound, Wilmington, North Carolina, U.S.
- Burial place: Arlington National Cemetery
- Military career
- Allegiance: United States
- Branch: United States Navy
- Service years: 1882–1924
- Rank: Admiral
- Commands: USS Callao (YFB-11); USS Yorktown (PG-1); USS Iowa (BB-4); USS New Hampshire (BB-25); Squadron 3, Patrol Force; Squadron 2, Patrol Force; Squadron 1, Patrol Detachment, Atlantic Fleet; Division 1, Cruiser Squadrons, Atlantic Fleet; Commandant, Sixth Naval District; United States Naval Forces in European Waters; Commander in Chief, Asiatic Fleet
- Conflicts: Spanish–American War: Battle of Cienfuegos; Battle of Guantanamo Bay; Battle of Fort Cayo del Tore; Philippine–American War; Mexican Revolution: Battle of Veracruz; World War I
- Awards: Medal of Honor (1914); Navy Distinguished Service Medal

Edwin Alexander Anderson Jr. (16 July 1860 – 23 September 1933) was a United States Navy officer who received the Medal of Honor for actions during the 1914 American intervention at Veracruz. He retired from the Navy in 1924, as an admiral.

== Early life and career ==
Anderson was born in Wilmington, North Carolina. He was appointed a cadet midshipman to the United States Naval Academy from the 3rd Congressional District of North Carolina, on 28 June 1878, and graduated with the Class of 1882, receiving his ensign's stripe on 1 July 1884, after the customary two-years' sea duty.

Anderson advanced slowly up the promotion ladder, such advancements in those times being received on basis of seniority; he remained an ensign for ten years before becoming a lieutenant, junior grade. Detached from the cruiser Columbia, Anderson reported on board the cruiser Marblehead on 28 January 1897, and was serving in that ship at the time of the outbreak of the Spanish–American War in the spring of 1898.

== Spanish–American War ==
At that time, the United States Navy threw a blockade around Cuba. By early May 1898, Marblehead was operating off the south coast of Cuba, off the port of Cienfuegos—a cable terminus important to Spanish communications—in company with the converted yacht Eagle, the gunboat Nashville, the revenue cutter Windom and the collier Saturn.

To sever this vital link, Captain Bowman H. McCalla, senior officer in the group, planned an operation to cut the cable at Cienfuegos, designating Lieutenant Cameron McRae Winslow as the commanding officer, with Lieutenant, (jg) Anderson as his second-in-command. Winslow accordingly gave Anderson command of the sailing launches from Marblehead.

After the guns of the two warships smashed Spanish positions ashore, the boats moved in to carry out the operation. Anderson's boat quickly snatched up the first cable and, assisted by Nashville's boat, cut it. They soon grapneled a second cable and were in the process of cutting it, too, when the Spaniards opened a slow fire that soon grew to volley proportions, from rifles, automatic weapons and one-pounders. After a Spanish bullet felled the coxswain of Anderson's boat, Anderson took the helm and began steering the boat seaward, directing his men to keep down between the thwarts. The Spanish fire, however wounded three more men and holed the boat in many places. After the action, Anderson had nothing but praise for his sailors and marines, commending their intelligent and cheerful work in the exhausting labor of picking up and cutting the heavy cables, working even under heavy fire until ordered to stop. The operation proved successful in another aspect. The ships gunfire decimated a large Spanish force sent to the area to contest the operation.

Subsequently, Anderson delivered the prize steamer Adula to Savannah, Georgia, in July 1898, and was given command of another Spanish prize, the gunboat Alvarado. Recommended for advancement in grade for his heroism at Cienfuegos in August 1898, this advancement (five numbers in grade) came finally on 11 February 1901.

== Post-war advancement, Medal of Honor ==
Anderson commanded the gunboat Callao from 13 April 1901 – 24 December 1903, in the Philippines, and, later, in Hong Kong. During the remainder of the 1900s, Anderson advanced to commander; among his tours of duty included a stint at the Navy Recruiting Station, Cincinnati, Ohio, and at the Mare Island Navy Yard as ordnance officer before being given command of the gunboat Yorktown in the autumn of 1910. He briefly commanded the battleship Iowa during the assemblage the fleet in New York City before being detached for duty as Captain of the Yard at the Philadelphia Navy Yard.

Late in 1913, Anderson was given command of the battleship New Hampshire, and while in command of that ship, took part in the American intervention at Veracruz, Mexico, in April 1914. Given command of the Second Seaman Regiment, Anderson led that bluejacket landing force ashore and so distinguished himself in the fighting that followed that he received the Medal of Honor.

Subsequently attending the Naval War College, Anderson served as Supervisor of Naval Auxiliary Reserves, Norfolk, and later as Commander, Squadron Three, Patrol Force, assigned defense duties out of Key West, Florida, during World War I, with Dolphin as his flagship. He was promoted to rear admiral and took command of Squadron One, Patrol Force, Atlantic Fleet, for the duration of the First World War.

== Flag assignments ==
Over the next few years, Anderson flew his flag as Commander Division 1, Cruiser Squadrons, Atlantic Fleet, and as Commandant, Sixth Naval District, headquartered at Charleston, South Carolina, before assuming command of United States Naval Forces in European Waters, with the rank of vice admiral. He was soon redesignated as Commander in Chief, Asiatic Fleet, however from 28 August 1922.

Continued turmoil in China had occasioned the presence of substantial numbers of foreign warships in Chinese waters including the Asiatic Fleet. Anderson's ships carried out the usual kinds of peacetime operations ever ready to perform protective service for American nationals. During his tour, however the Fleet distinguished itself in quite an unexpected fashion.

A severe earthquake rocked Japan, causing heavy damage to such cities as Tokyo and Yokohama. As Secretary of the Navy Edwin C. Denby reported in 1923, "One of the brightest pages in the history of the Navy has recently been written by the Asiatic Fleet in its mission of mercy to the stricken people of Japan." Admiral Anderson promptly placed his fleet at the disposal of the Japanese, immediately dispatched a division of destroyers from Chinese waters to Yokohama with medical supplies to render assistance. The ships of Destroyer Division 38, led by the destroyer Stewart, were in fact the first ships to render assistance to the city of Yokohama. All available naval vessels were laden with clothing, food, medicines, and supplies, and rushed to Japanese waters. Admiral Anderson himself arrived at Yokohama in his flagship the armored cruiser Huron on the afternoon of September 1923.

Within two weeks' time, the United States Ambassador in Japan, Cyrus E. Woods, could cable:

I have been informed by the Foreign Office that food emergency has been met. Only problem remaining is question of distribution. This the Japanese with their organizing ability and their ability to recover from shock desire to handle themselves. It will gratify the American people to know that the prompt action of Admiral Anderson has had much to do with this. American Navy's assistance thoroughly appreciated by the men in the street as well as the Japanese government. I wish to emphasize that in this critical emergency the first assistance from the outside world since the catastrophe was brought by our Asiatic Fleet.

Subsequently, the Japanese Ambassador to the United States, Masanao Hanihara, expressed gratitude for Admiral Anderson's "unflagging zeal and efficiency" that led to the "prompt and gallant assistance" that enabled the situation to be brought "well under control in a short time."

== Retirement and death ==
Relieved by Admiral Thomas Washington on 11 October 1923, Anderson returned to the United States, and was placed on the retired list with the permanent rank of admiral on 23 March 1924.

Anderson died at his home in Masonboro Sound, Wilmington, North Carolina on 23 September 1933. He was buried at Arlington National Cemetery, in Arlington, Virginia.

== Awards ==
- Medal of Honor
- Distinguished Service Medal
- Sampson Medal
- Spanish Campaign Medal
- Mexican Service Medal
- World War I Victory Medal

=== Medal of Honor citation ===
Rank and organization: Captain, U.S. Navy. Born: 16 July 1860, Wilmington N.C. Accredited to: North Carolina. G.O. No.: 177, 4 December 1915. Other Navy award: Distinguished Service Medal.

Citation:

For extraordinary heroism in battle, engagement of Vera Cruz, 22 April 1914, in command of the 2d Seaman Regiment. Marching his regiment across the open space in front of the Naval Academy and other buildings, Capt. Anderson unexpectedly met a heavy fire from riflemen, machineguns and 1-pounders, which caused part of his command to break and fall back, many casualties occurring amongst them at the time. His indifference to the heavy fire, to which he himself was exposed at the head of his regiment, showed him to be fearless and courageous in battle.

== Namesake ==
A Sims-class destroyer in the United States Navy, USS Anderson, was named in his honor, was sunk in 1946, during atomic bomb tests as part of Operation Crossroads.

== See also ==
- List of Medal of Honor recipients (Veracruz)

== Bibliography ==
- "Edwin Alexander Anderson". Dictionary of American Naval Fighting Ships. Naval History and Heritage Command. 29 September 2016.
- Who Was Who in American History, the Military. Marquis Who's Who, Inc. 1975. p. 10. ISBN 0837932017.
- "Valor awards for Edwin Alexander Anderson".
- "Arlington National Cemetery » Medal of Honor Historical Society of the United States".

Military offices
Preceded by Joseph Strauss	Commander-in-Chief, United States Asiatic Fleet; 28 August 1922 – 11 October 1923	Succeeded by Thomas Washington
