= USS Aramis =

Patrol vessel of the United States Navy

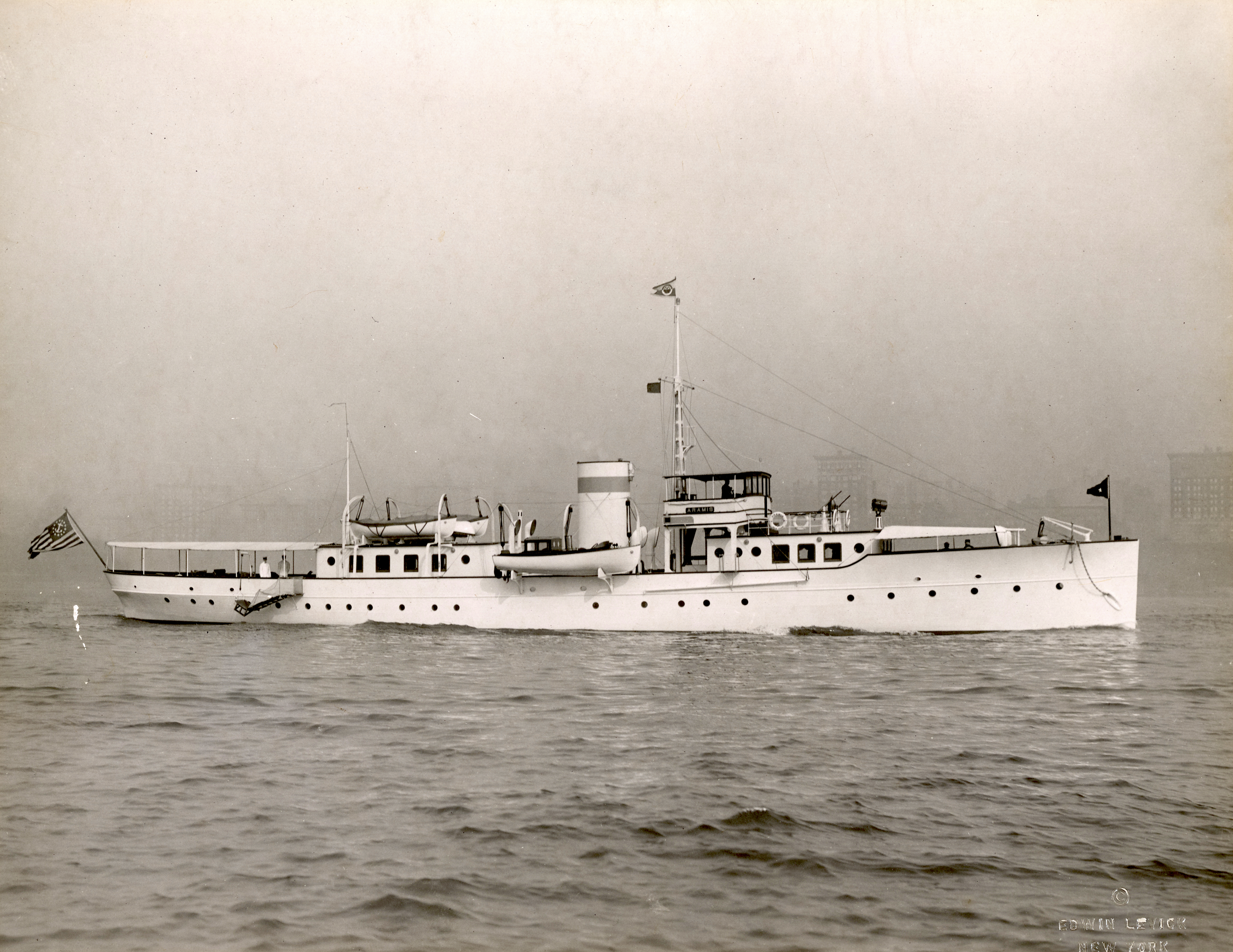

History

United States
- Name: Aramis
- Namesake: Aramis
- Builder: Robert Jacob Shipyard, City Island, New York
- Completed: 1916
- Acquired: 3 July 1917
- Commissioned: 2 November 1917
- Decommissioned: 6 October 1921
- Reclassified: PY-7, 17 July 1920
- Stricken: 20 July 1933
- Fate: Sold, 13 November 1933

General characteristics
- Type: Patrol Yacht
- Displacement: 375 long tons (381 t)
- Length: 157 ft 6 in (48.01 m)
- Beam: 22 ft 4 in (6.81 m)
- Draft: 7 ft 6 in (2.29 m)
- Propulsion: 2 × 350 hp (261 kW) Craig diesel engines, one shaft
- Speed: 13 knots (24 km/h; 15 mph)
- Complement: 33
- Armament: 2 × 6-pounder guns; 2 × 1-pounder guns; 2 × Colt machine guns

USS Aramis (SP-418/PY-7) was a yacht acquired by the United States Navy during World War I which served as a patrol boat off New York City, was then fitted with an experimental "underwater detection system" and depth charges as an anti-submarine vessel, and was briefly the flagship of a battleship squadron. She ended her career as a tender and houseboat to a survey vessel off the coast of Cuba, until disposed of in 1933.

== Construction ==
 Aramis was a steel-hulled yacht designed by the naval architects Swasey, Raymond, and Page. Completed in 1916 at City Island, New York, by Robert Jacob Shipyard, she was built for Arthur Hudson Marks, the vice president of the Goodrich Rubber Co., of Akron, Ohio. Equipped with one of the first marine diesel engines to be installed in an American yacht, Aramis came to the Navy's notice soon after the United States entered World War I in April 1917.

== Service history ==
=== Patrol craft ===
The Navy acquired Aramis on 3 July, "enrolled" her six days later, and accepted her on 11 August for service at the New York Navy Yard. Assigned the designation SP-418, she was placed in commission there on 2 November 1917.

The next morning, Aramis proceeded, via Fort Lafayette, to her patrol station at the mouth of New York Harbor, arriving at the net defenses that afternoon. She maintained watch there until the morning of the 5th, noting the movement of other patrol craft and, at night, sweeping the net with her searchlight every 30 minutes. After her second tour at the net defenses on the 6th and 7th, she returned to moor at the pier at the foot of 24th Street on the 8th. Returning to the nets later that day, she spotted a strange craft in a forbidden area. Aramis lowered her launch, under the command of her executive officer, Lt. (jg.) Williams, USNRF, to give chase. Ultimately, he returned with the launch Kid, its occupants arrested for an intrusion into the net area off limits to private craft. A similar incident occurred over a week later when Aramis hailed a launch that crossed the net but did not stop. On that occasion, a section patrol craft SP-1201 overtook the intruder, took her into custody, and towed her to Fort Lafayette.

Underway from the ordnance pier at Sandy Hook at 11:50 on 20 November, bound for the Scotland and Ambrose Lightships, Aramis received orders by semaphore from the tug Cayuga to report forthwith to the New York Navy Yard. Arriving at 17:15 for further orders, Aramis shifted to the Jersey Central Railroad Pier the next morning where she was briefly visited by Secretary of War Newton D. Baker. The purpose of the Secretary's visit is not clear from the ship's log. After disembarking her distinguished guest, Aramis returned to the New York Navy Yard and shifted thence to the Marine Basin, Brooklyn, on the 24th.

=== Underwater detection system ===
Underway for New London, Connecticut, on the morning of 4 December, Aramis reached port the following morning. She provisioned there and then, on the afternoon of the 20th, voyaged to the marine railway of the Riverside shipyard at Greenport, Long Island, New York. On the morning of the 22nd, the ship was hauled out for repairs and alterations—and, apparently, the installation of a primitive underwater detection system.

Off the ways on 9 January 1918, Aramis returned to New London. There, off Fort Trumbull, a launch from the cruiser Chicago, the flagship for the Submarine Force, Atlantic Fleet, came alongside on the morning of 18 January bearing Lt. Comdr. Chester W. Nimitz—the future fleet admiral—and a board of officers and civilians to test the recently installed listening apparatus. The yacht carried out further experimentation with the listening gear into February, when she was ordered back to the New York Navy Yard.

Casting off from the Public Dock, New London, at 10:43 on the 7th, the ship was caught briefly in an ice floe two hours later. She made stops at New Haven, Connecticut, and at the Marine Basin, Brooklyn, before reaching the navy yard early on the 27th. Ordered to convoy the submarine L-5 (Submarine No. 44) to New London, Aramis got underway with her charge at 10:00 that same morning and escorted the submersible on her voyage without incident, reaching their destination later the same day. Returning to New York the next morning, Aramis struck submerged wreckage near Middle Ground Light, knocking off a blade of her port screw. As she continued onward she passed through "considerable wreckage" on the "steamer track" 10 miles east of Middle Ground Light, flotsam that included hatches and parts of heavy decking.

Aramis reached the Marine Basin late on the 28th and shifted to Seabury's Shipyard, Morris Heights, on 5 March. She remained there into April undergoing repairs and shifted to the New York Navy Yard on the 9th. On 16 May, while the ship was at Section Base No. 6, Bath Beach, Brooklyn, Rear Admiral Nathaniel R. Usher and Captain Louis de Steiguer inspected the ship. On 21 June, while the ship was undergoing a refit at Shewan's Shipyard, Brooklyn, Elmer A. Sperry, the inventor of the gyroscopic compass, came on board to work on one of his compasses that had been installed in the ship.

=== Anti-submarine vessel ===
Underway from Shewan's yard on the afternoon of 27 June, Aramis arrived at Section Base No. 6 later that day. On the 28th, she shifted to the Ammunition Depot at Fort Lafayette, and there took on board four Mark I depth charges, the most primitive type, which required no fixed launcher — only a strong sailor to heave it over the side. Now equipped with listening gear and an anti-submarine warfare (ASW) capability, albeit primitive, Aramis returned to the business of patrolling the waters of the 3rd Naval District assigned her.

Aramis spent much of July engaged in training "listeners", operating out of Section Base No. 6. She also performed local convoy escort duties on 16 July and lay at a "listening post" the following day, apparently near the course of a convoy. Her regimen remained the same into August, and she spent the first few days of that month engaged in "listening" on station near Ambrose Lightship, alternating with Tarantula (SP-124) and Sabalo (SP-225), and the submarine chasers SC-52, SC-53, and SC-56.

Underway from Section Base No. 6 at 11:57 on 12 August, Aramis relieved SC-55 at the Fire Island lightship at 17:00 and commenced listening with her "K" tubes (the primitive listening gear) soon thereafter. At 18:45, Aramis came upon the captain and crew (30 men in all) of the Norwegian steamer Sommerstad, three days out of Halifax, Nova Scotia, which had been torpedoed and sunk by the German submarine U-117 that morning. Picking up the Norwegian sailors and taking their boats in tow, Aramis headed back to port at 23:00. After casting Sommerstad's motor sailer—in a leaky condition—adrift, Aramis reached the Barge Office at the Battery, New York City, at 11:05 on the 13th, where the Norwegians were sent ashore to be aided by their consul. Underway again at 11:35, Aramis reached Section Base No. 6 at 12:45, her rescue mission completed. However, she did not stay long before she got underway again for a patrol station soon thereafter. Unfortunately, at 18:30 that afternoon, Aramis rammed Preble (Coast Torpedo Vessel No. 12), causing the latter to miss the sailing of a convoy, but suffered no damage herself.

While returning to her section base at 15:55 the next day, Aramis' forward lookout spotted what looked like a floating spar about 300 yards off the starboard bow. Ensign George Dumars, USNRF, the officer of the deck, managed to obtain a quick glimpse of it before it vanished. Aramis was brought dead in the water and her listening gear was put into operation. The man listening reported that he heard submarine engines. Within five minutes, the commanding officer, Ensign Leroy W. Tilt, USNRF, called all hands to general quarters. Reporting the presence of a submarine to district headquarters, Aramis bent on speed and came about. At 17:15, the patrol craft spotted the Hauoli, standing up from the eastward, about seven miles south. After her attempts to reach that vessel by radio failed, Aramis fired a blank charge to attract Hauoli's attention, and the patrol boat came alongside at 18:00. Unfortunately, Hauoli's approach "gummed the listening device to such an extent as to drown all other sounds," enabling the submarine—as everyone believed it was—to slip away. Aramis, with Hauoli standing by, then headed for the spot the submarine had last been seen and, during the next quarter-hour dropped her four Mark I depth charges, one by one. Unfortunately, none of them worked.

Subsequently, shifting from Base No. 6 to the Marine Basin at Brooklyn—where she took on board a pair of depth charges from Shubrick (Coast Torpedo Boat No. 31)—Aramis relieved the converted yacht Gloucester on patrol duty on 18 August before returning to the Marine Basin for the installation of new wireless equipment. She proceeded to her section base on the 25th, only to move over to Shewan's shipyard on the 27th.

=== Flagship ===
No logs exist for Aramis' activities over the next four months, but extant message traffic reveals that she was detached from the 3rd Naval District on 18 September for use as a division commander's flagship and was directed to proceed to Base Two (Yorktown, Virginia) and report to the Commander-in-Chief, Atlantic Fleet. However, Aramis' chronic engine trouble delayed her departure until 6 October 1918, when the yacht finally sailed unescorted. What followed for the next month and a half—during which the armistice brought World War I to an end—is not certain; but, on 22 November 1918, Rear Admiral Thomas Washington, Commander, Battleship Division 3, Atlantic Fleet, assumed command of his division and broke his flag in Aramis. Unfortunately, Aramis' history of engine trouble again proved her undoing. The message traffic indicates that she proved to be unsuitable for her new task; and, on 3 December, Owera was ordered to proceed to relieve Aramis as flagship for the Commander of Battleship Division 3.

=== Post-war service ===
Detached on 12 December, Aramis was assigned temporary duty at the Submarine Base, New London. Upon the arrival of Yacona, Aramis was directed to proceed to Commander, Submarine Base, New London. Aramis' subsequent movements appear to have elicited considerable interest within the 3rd and 4th Naval Districts, since at one point nobody knew for sure where she was. Limping into Lewes, Delaware, on the afternoon of 20 December, Aramis finally reached New London by the end of the year, since when her log resumed on 1 January 1919, she was at that port, moored at Dock "D", Submarine Base.

Although detached from duty at New London on 17 March, Aramis did not get underway until the morning of 1 April 1919 and reached New York the following morning, anchoring in the familiar waters off Section Base No. 6. Aramis shifted to Pier "A", the Battery, on the afternoon of 6 April 1919, and, the following morning at 10:05, embarked Rear Admiral Guy H. Burrage, and a party that included Mrs. William S. Sims and the Sims' children, Margaret, Adeline, and William, Jr., to await the return from Europe of Rear Admiral William S. Sims, the former commander of United States naval forces operating in European waters. Underway at 10:40, the yacht proceeded down the harbor. The passage toward the reunion of the admiral and his family, however, was almost a disaster. At 11:00, Aramis sighted a British freighter on a converging course and swung to the right side of the shipping channel in order to give the merchantman the advantage of deeper water. Aramis blew one whistle signal and maintained her course and speed, but the steamer did not show any intention of slowing down and bore down on the yacht. Lt. (jg.) Tilt, in making his protest over the handling of the British merchantman, reported what followed: "The steamer ... in going under our stern came so close that had the Aramis not thrown the wheel hard over left a collision would have occurred." Aramis resumed her harbor cruise, and proceeded without further incident. She moored alongside the British Cunard liner RMS Mauretania at 16:00 and soon embarked her distinguished passenger, Admiral Sims. Docking at Pier "A" a little under an hour later, she disembarked the reunited family and the other dignitaries who had been on board and returned to her section base.

Aramis remained in the New York area into the summer. She cruised to New London and back in late July before receiving orders, dated 9 August 1919, sending her to the Potomac River as the prospective relief for Sylph. Departing New York on 8 September, Aramis reached the Washington Navy Yard on 13 September and remained there, being assigned duty, along with Nokomis as a "Navy Department tender." On 24 October, orders arrived directing the ships to sail for the New York Navy Yard to undergo conversion work. Returning to the New York Navy Yard on 10 November 1919, Aramis remained there for the rest of 1919 and for all of 1920, retained in commission but inactive. During this time in Brooklyn, she was re-classified as a "patrol vessel, converted yacht," and was renumbered PY-7, on 17 July 1920.

=== Decommissioning ===
Early the following year, it had been thought that Aramis would ultimately relieve Sylph, but the cost of necessary work to the former apparently caused a rethinking of the idea, and it was accordingly dropped between March and June, 1921. The Chief of Naval Operations subsequently directed the Commandant of the 3rd Naval District on 3 September 1921 to place Aramis out of commission "as soon as is practicable... with a view toward the eventual recommissioning of this vessel." Accordingly, on 6 October 1921, Aramis was decommissioned at the New York Navy Yard. Towed by the fleet tug Iuka, Aramis reached the reserve basin at the Philadelphia Navy Yard on 9 October 1923 and remained inactive until redesignated as a "District Craft, Unclassified," in late 1924. She was then slated to serve as a tender and houseboat to Nokomis, which was being assigned to survey duty off the coast of Cuba.

=== Service as Tender, and disposal ===
Assigned to the 7th Naval District, Aramis was towed to Key West, Florida, by the tug Bay Spring in December 1924. For the next nine years, the yacht remained in operation, kept in repair by the crew of Nokomis as that ship conducted important surveys based at Cárdenas on the northeastern coast of Cuba. Finally, after she had deteriorated to the point where she was unfit for further naval service, Aramis was placed on the list of naval vessels to be disposed of by sale or salvage. Stripped of all useful items at the Guantanamo Bay Naval Base, Cuba, by mid-July 1933, Aramis was struck from the Navy List on 20 July 1933. She was sold to R.E. O'Fallon of Guantanamo Bay, Cuba, on 13 November 1933. Her ultimate fate is unknown.
