= Hercules (1907 ship) =

1907-built American steam tugboat

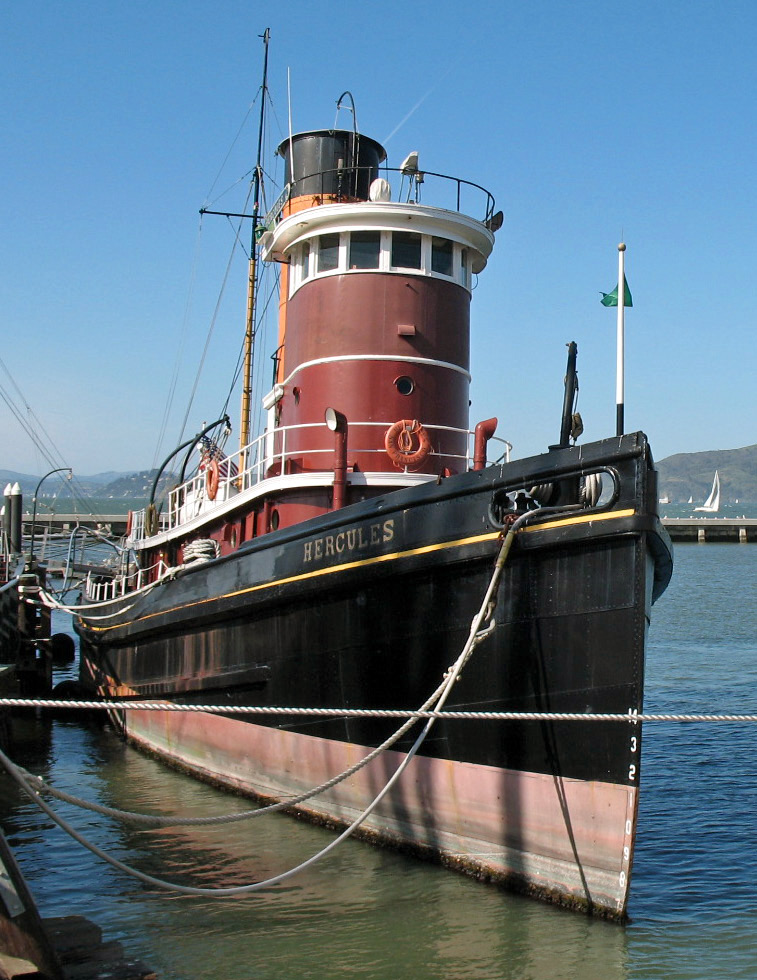
- Hercules at Hyde Street Pier, San Francisco Maritime National Historic Park

History

United States
- Owner: Shipowners' and Merchants' Tugboat Company (1907–1924); Western Pacific Railroad (1924–1975); California State Park Foundation (1975–1977); National Park Service (1977–)
- Builder: John H. Dialogue and Sons, Camden, New Jersey
- Launched: 1907
- In service: 1907
- Out of service: 1962
- Identification: Official number: 20481
- Status: Museum ship

General characteristics
- Type: Tugboat
- Tonnage: 409 GT
- Length: 151 ft (46 m) LOA
- Beam: 26 ft (7.9 m)
- Draft: 11 ft (3.4 m) aft; 10 ft (3.0 m) forward
- Propulsion: Scotch marine fire tube boiler, 4 × oil-burning furnaces; 1 × 1,000 hp (746 kW) 3-cylinder triple expansion steam engine
- Speed: 10 knots (19 km/h; 12 mph)
- Crew: 15
- Hercules (tug)
- U.S. National Register of Historic Places
- U.S. National Historic Landmark
- Location within California Location within the United States
- Location: San Francisco, California
- Coordinates: 37°48′36″N 122°25′20″W
- Built: 1906
- Architect: John H. Dialogue and Sons
- NRHP reference No.: 75000225

Significant dates
- Added to NRHP: January 17, 1975
- Designated NHL: January 17, 1986

Hercules is a 1907-built former ocean-going steam tugboat that is currently docked on Mare Island in Vallejo, California while the Hyde Street Pier, her former docked location, is being rebuilt. She is currently owned by the United States' National Park Service and has undergone a full structural rework between August 2023 and 2025.

== History ==
Hercules was built in 1907 by John H. Dialogue and Sons, of Camden, New Jersey. She was built for the Shipowners' and Merchants' Tugboat Company of San Francisco, as part of their Red Stack Fleet (a part of today's Crowley Maritime Corporation). After completion, Hercules was sailed to San Francisco via the Straits of Magellan with her sister ship, Goliah, in tow.

For the first part of her life, Hercules was an oceangoing tug. Because of the prevailing northwest winds, sailing ships often employed Hercules and her sisters on journeys north up the coast from San Francisco. For example, in 1916, Hercules towed C.A. Thayer to Port Townsend, Washington. On return trips back down the coast, Hercules often towed log rafts of Pacific Northwest timber, to Southern California mills. At other times, Hercules was employed towing barges to other ports on the West Coast and to Hawaii, and in transporting equipment for the construction of the Panama Canal.

In 1919, working in concert with other tugs, Hercules helped tow the newly launched USS California from Mare Island Navy Shipyard to Hunter's Point, so that the battleship could receive further work prior to commissioning.

In 1924, Hercules was acquired by the Western Pacific Railroad. For her new owners, she worked shuttling railroad car floats across San Francisco Bay from Oakland and Alameda to San Francisco. She worked in this role until 1957, when she was replaced by the diesel-powered train ferry Las Plumas. Hercules was kept in a stand-by role to the new ferry until 1961.

The California State Park Foundation acquired Hercules in 1975, and the National Park Service took over her restoration in 1977. In 1986 she was designated a National Historic Landmark. She is now one of the exhibits of the San Francisco Maritime National Historical Park and is to be found moored at the park's Hyde Street Pier.

== Image gallery ==
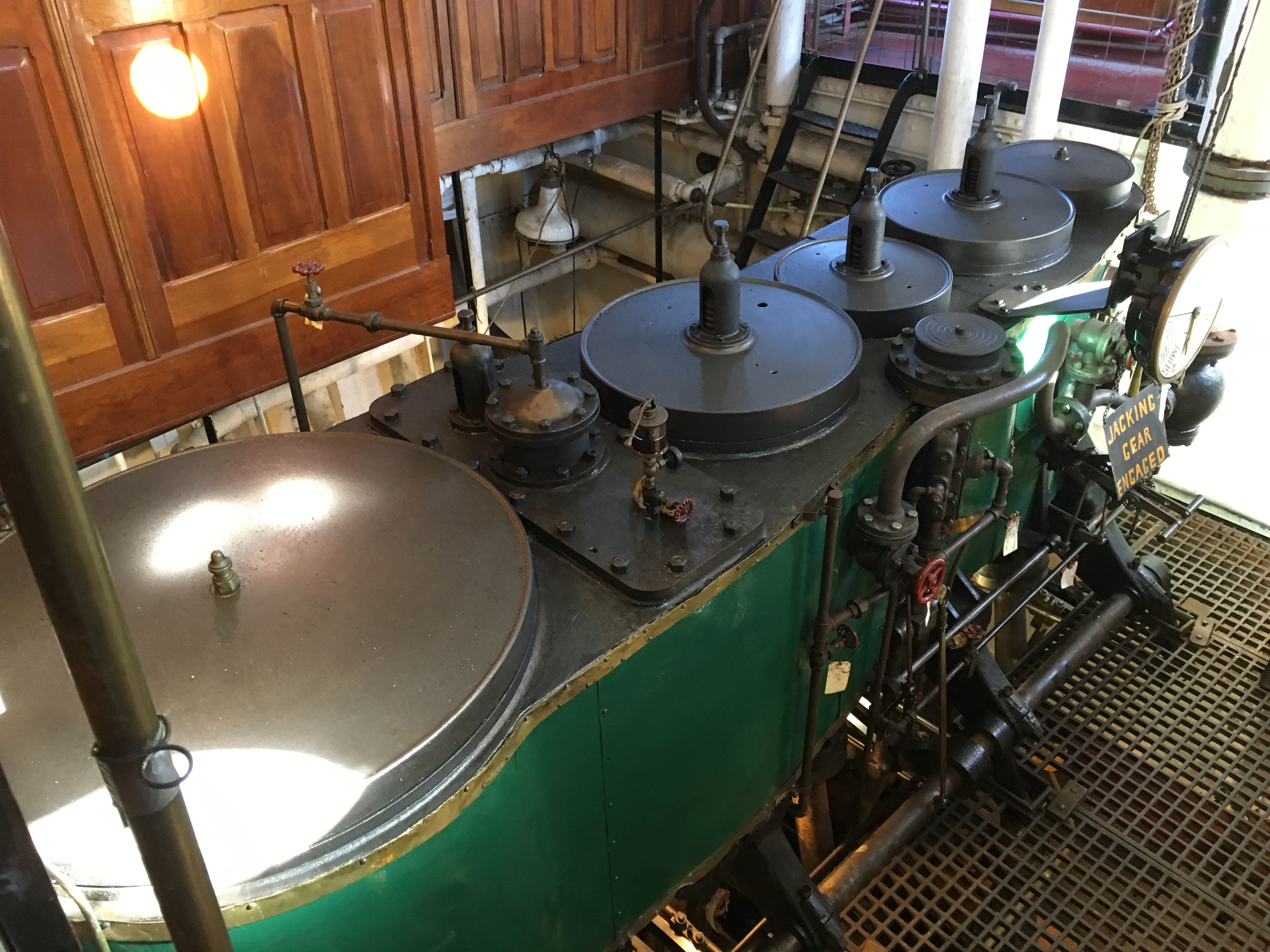
Triple expansion steam engine

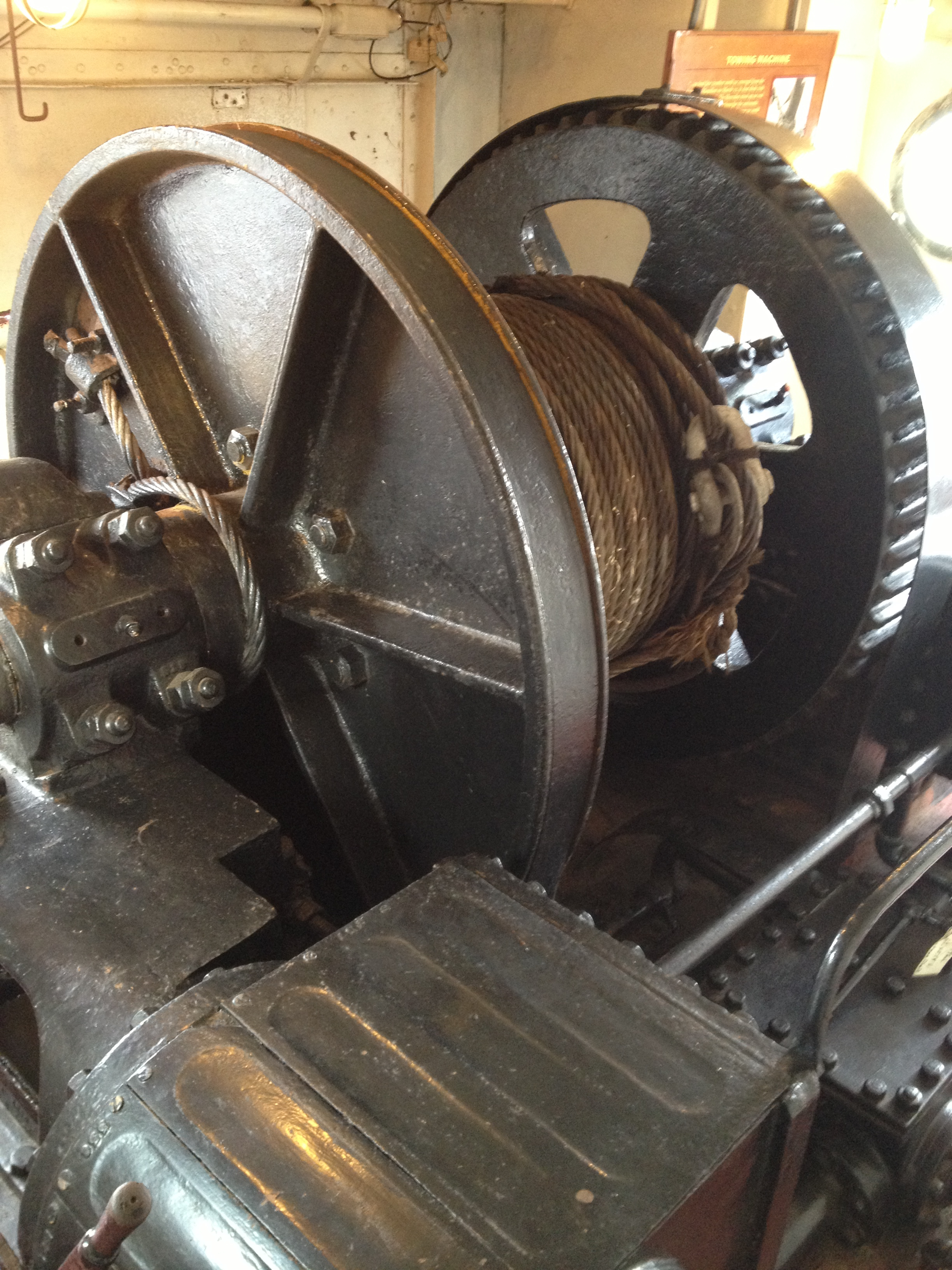
Towing machine

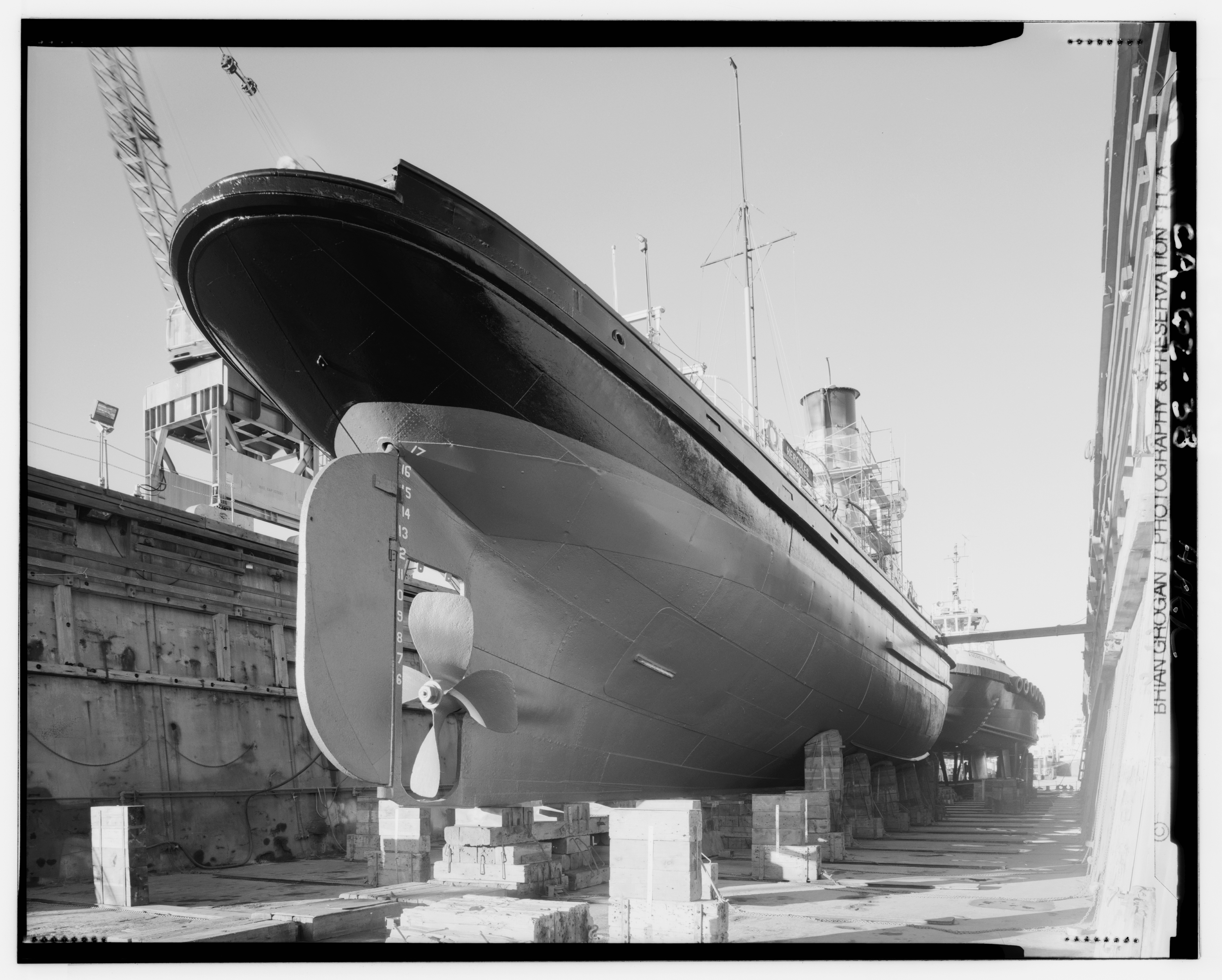
In dry dock

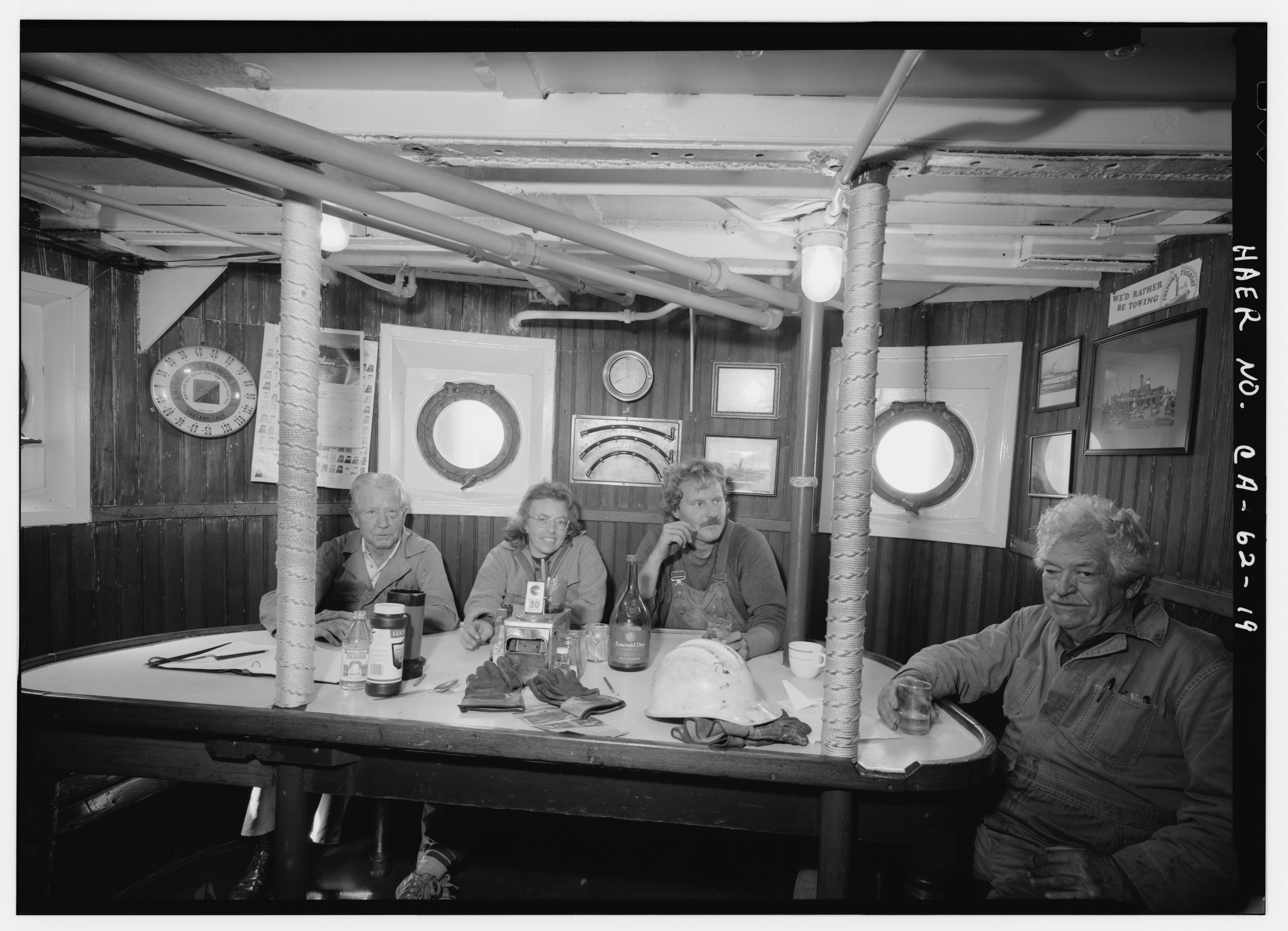
Crew's mess

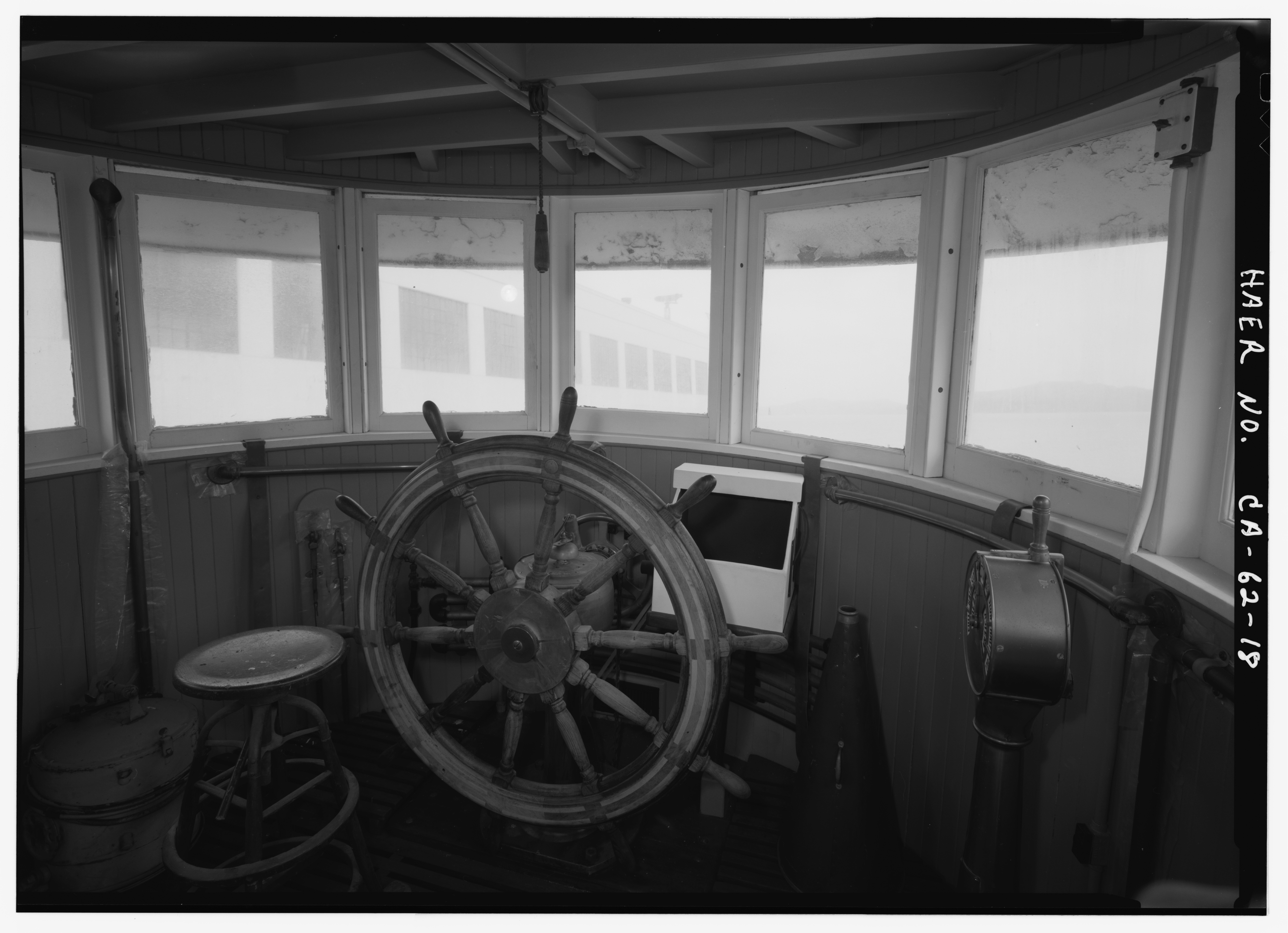
Wheelhouse

== Sources ==
- "Hercules". National Park Service. Archived from the original on June 21, 2005.
- Brehm, Frank (1996–2005). "Western Pacific - Marine".
