= Levinson v. United States =

- Supreme Court of the United States

Argued March 3, 1922 Decided March 13, 1922
- Full case name: Levinson v. United States
- Citations: 258 U.S. 198 (more) 42 S. Ct. 275; 66 L. Ed. 563

Case history
- Prior: United States v. Levinson, 267 F. 692 (2d Cir. 1920)

Court membership
- Chief Justice William H. Taft Associate Justices Joseph McKenna · Oliver W. Holmes Jr. William R. Day · Willis Van Devanter; Mahlon Pitney · James C. McReynolds; Louis Brandeis · John H. Clarke

Case opinions
- Majority: Holmes, joined by Day, Van Devanter, Pitney, McReynolds, Brandeis
- Dissent: McKenna

Levinson v. United States, 258 U.S. 198 (1922), was a United States Supreme Court decision governing the sale by the United States Navy of the yacht USS Wadena. The court held that the government acted within its authority in selling the yacht to someone who was not actually the highest bidder, and was therefore bound by the sale even after the higher bid was discovered. The case is one of a line of cases that established that the federal government can be bound by the apparent authority of its agents.

The Navy had used the Wadena in World War I and auctioned it off after the war ended. Levinson and Johnson both submitted bids. Johnson's was the higher bid, but his bid was lost, inadvertently assigned to the similarly-spelled USS Wandena, which was also being sold. The Navy subsequently sold and delivered title to the Wadena to Levinson. However, upon discovering Johnson's bid, the Navy stopped the transfer and asked Johnson to return the bill of sale. When Johnson refused, the United States government brought an action in interpleader in the Southern District of New York to resolve the ownership dispute. The Navy also supported Johnson's claim and argued that the transfer of the bill of sale to Levinson should be set aside on grounds of mutual mistake.

The district court ruled in favor of Levinson. However, on appeal the Second Circuit Court of Appeals reversed. The court dismissed the government's appeal, on the ground that it was not a party to the controversy, and also held that the Secretary of the Navy had acted outside his statutory authority in transferring the yacht to someone who was not the highest bidder. It therefore awarded ownership of the yacht to Johnson.

The Supreme Court reversed the court of appeals on both issues, holding that it was appropriate for the Navy to participate in the appeal, and Levinson should be awarded the boat. The United States argued that the Navy had no authority to sell the boat for less than the highest bid, and therefore the sale was void. The Supreme Court disagreed and held that the word "unless" in the statutory provision that "no vessel of the Navy shall hereafter be sold in any other manner than herein provided, or for less than such appraised value unless the President of the United States shall otherwise direct in writing" applied to the entire preceding sentence, thus allowing the president and his agents to vary both the amount of sale and the manner of sale.
