= USS Mariner (SP-1136) =

Tugboat of the United States Navy

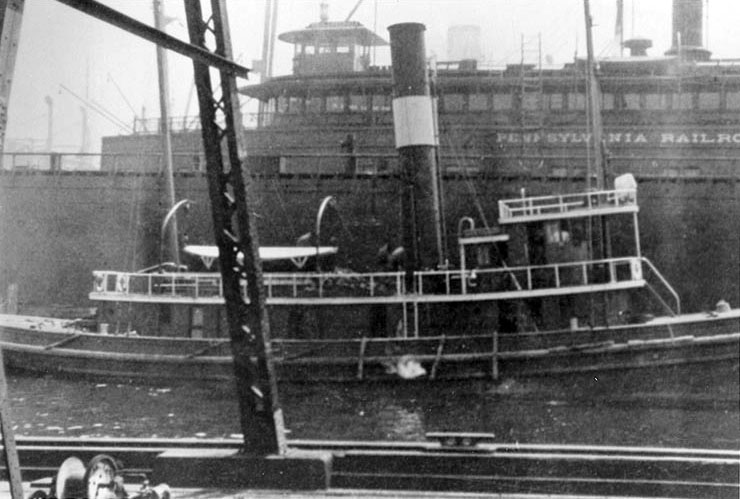
- Tug Jack T. Scully, later USS Mariner (SP-1136), of the Neptune Line pictured in front of a Pennsylvania Railroad ferry, c. 1917. Mariner sank during a gale in the North Atlantic on 26 February 1918.

History

United States
- Name: USS Mariner
- Builder: A. C. Brown, Tottenville, Staten Island, New York
- Launched: 1899
- Acquired: 25 September 1917
- Commissioned: 19 December 1917
- Reclassified: SP-1136
- Stricken: 8 March 1918
- Fate: Foundered and sank in storm, 26 February 1918

General characteristics
- Displacement: 220
- Length: 109 ft 6 in (33.38 m)
- Beam: 24 ft 7 in (7.49 m)
- Draft: 10 ft 9 in (3.28 m)
- Speed: 11 knots (20 km/h; 13 mph)
- Armament: 1 × 3"/50 caliber gun mount; 2 × machine guns

USS Mariner (SP-1136) was a wooden-hulled tugboat for the United States Navy in World War I. She had previously been the Jack T. Scully of the Neptune Line of New York before her acquisition by the Navy. She foundered and sank in a gale on 26 February 1918 while part of a convoy steaming to Bermuda.

== History ==
Mariner, formerly the steam tug Jack T. Scully of the Neptune Line, New York City, was built in 1899 by A. C. Brown, Tottenville, Staten Island, New York and had previously steamed between New York and Bangor, Maine. Considered “strongly built” and a “good sea boat” for potential employment as a minesweeper, Mariner was delivered to the Navy on 25 September 1917. Earmarked “for distant service” on 1 October 1917 and given the designation SP-1136, she was commissioned at the New York Navy Yard, Brooklyn, New York, on 19 December 1917. The Navy spent $3,000 refitting the tug for naval service.

Initially, Mariner performed routine duty at the New York Navy Yard and in the waters of New York harbor. Following that period of local work, she got underway on 6 February 1918 in company with converted yachts Yacona and Wadena, bound for New London, Connecticut. The little convoy proceeded uneventfully until increasingly heavy ice floes began to impede their progress. Mariner took Wadena in tow, getting her through one congested area and then dropping the tow when clear. When Wadena again ran into difficulty, Mariner took the yacht in tow, until forced to stop (Yacona then took Wadena in tow for a time) when the ice in Long Island Sound smashed in some of her timbers, compelling Lt.(jg) Miller to order the tug beached at New London to facilitate repairs. Once again seaworthy, Mariner steamed up Narragansett Bay to the coaling station at Melville, Rhode Island, where she helped Yacona get underway for Newport during the afternoon watch on 23 February, then proceeded to assist the section patrol boat Alpha that had suffered a fire at Melville later that same day. Mariner then shifted to Newport.

Mariner got underway for Bermuda on 24 February 1918 in company with Yacona and Wadena, the tug Lykens, eleven 110-foot (34 m) submarine chasers, and the French tug Mohican. As the convoy worked its way down the eastern seaboard, however, Mariner fell farther behind. She briefly towed the submarine chaser SC-177 before the tug herself began to founder in the heavy southwesterly gale that sprang up on 26 February. Her seams opened to the sea by the pounding of the waves, her pumps failed; rising water doused the fires under her boilers and rendered her helpless.

Consequently, Mariner hoisted the breakdown flag shortly before noon and cast loose SC-177. Shortly thereafter, the crew of Mariner signaled that they were sinking fast. Wadena stood by to render assistance, in rough and high seas. After embarking two groups of Mariner’s crew from life rafts, Wadena sprayed oil on the water to calm the seas, and then brought on board the rest of the tug's complement from three more rafts. The last group—which included Lt. (jg.) Miller, Mariner’s commanding officer—had abandoned the tug with its decks awash, and reached Wadena’s side at around 17:30. Abandoned, Mariner sank sometime after 21:45 that day at approximately 38°26′N 68°9′W.

While the rest of the convoy continued on its passage, Wadena retrieved SC-177 and ultimately reached the British naval station at Hamilton, Bermuda, on 1 March 1918.

Mariner was stricken from the Navy Register on 8 March 1918.
