= USS Alpha (SP-586) =

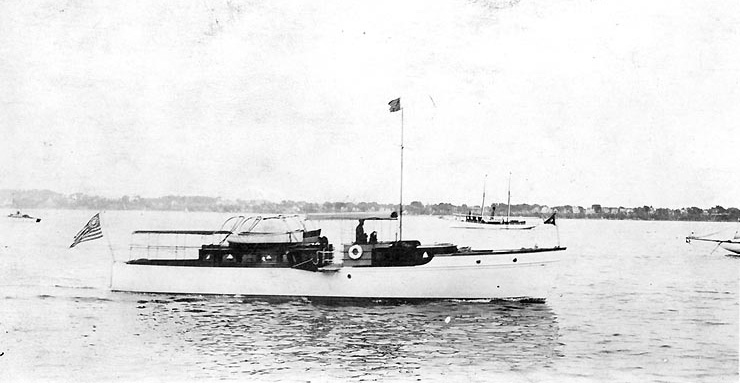
- Alpha, seen here underway sometime before World War I, was USS Alpha (SP-586) from 1917 to 1919.

History

United States
- Name: USS Alpha (SP-586)
- Namesake: the Greek letter Alpha
- Builder: Narragansett Bay Yacht Yard; Riverside, Rhode Island
- Launched: 1911
- Acquired: 19 May 1917
- Commissioned: 19 May 1917
- Decommissioned: on or before 17 May 1919
- Stricken: 17 May 1919
- Fate: Sold, 28 August 1919; ultimate fate unknown

General characteristics
- Tonnage: 10 tons, net
- Length: 56 ft (17 m)
- Beam: 9 ft 6 in (2.90 m)
- Draft: 3 ft 6 in (1.07 m), aft
- Speed: 11.3 mph (18.2 km/h)
- Complement: 7
- Armament: 1 × 1-pounder; 1 × machine gun

USS Alpha (SP-586) was a motor yacht that served as a patrol boat in the United States Navy during World War I

== History ==
Alpha, a 56-foot (17 m) motor yacht, was built in 1911 at Riverside, Rhode Island, by the Narragansett Bay Yacht Yard. She was purchased by the Navy on 19 May 1917 from Joel Fischer and commissioned that same day.

Assigned to the 2d Naval District section patrol, Alpha patrolled the waters of southern Massachusetts, Rhode Island, and Connecticut. The motorboat served the Navy through the end of World War I and into 1919.

On 23 December 1918, Alpha suffered a fire while at Melville, Rhode Island. The Navy tug Mariner steamed from Newport to assist Alpha and her crew.

Her name was struck from the Navy list on 17 May 1919, and she was sold to Arthur Palmer of Quincy, Massachusetts, on 28 August 1919. Her ultimate fate is unknown.
