= USS Owera =

Patrol vessel of the United States Navy

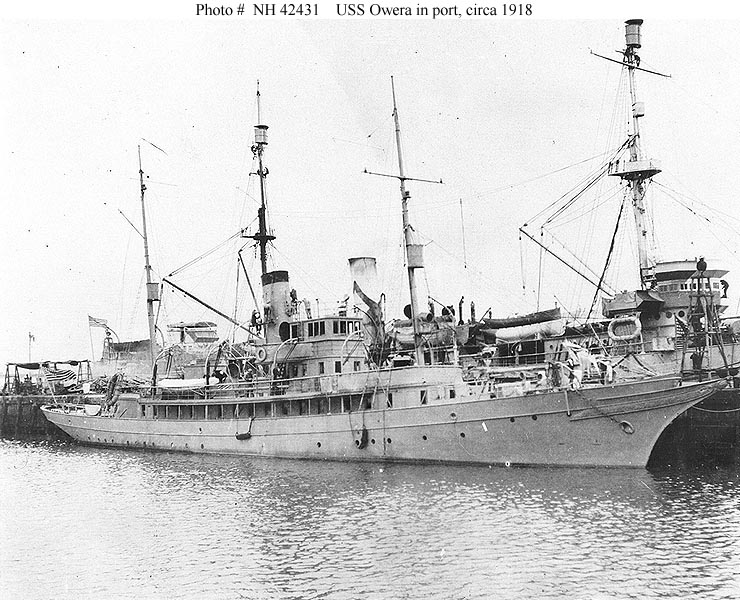
- USS Owera in a United States East Coast port ca. 1918. Destroyer tender USS Prairie is across the pier.

History

United States
- Name: O-We-Ra (1907-c.1908); Owera (c.1908-1926); Alcedo (1926-1928); Josephine (1928-1929); Owera (1929-c.1933); South Wind (c.1933-1936); O-We-Ra (1936-1967)
- Builder: Ramage & Ferguson, Leith, Scotland
- Yard number: 207
- Launched: 2 November 1906
- Completed: 1907
- Acquired: USN: Formally leased 18 June 1917
- Commissioned: USN: 15 June 1917
- Decommissioned: USN: 6 January 1919
- In service: 1907—1967 inclusive yacht, USN, RN, commercial
- Identification: UK Official number 123023; US Official number 212974; US signal letters: LFGP (1915—1934), KLKJ (1934—1936)
- Fate: Sank at berth 1950s, broken up 1967
- Notes: Built as civilian yacht O-We-Ra 1907, sold and renamed multiple times, service in USN and RN in two wars, until removed from registers about 1966.

General characteristics
- Type: Steel steam yacht; Patrol vessel, USN and RN; Passenger/freight vessel
- Tonnage: 426 Gross register tons
- Length: 194 ft 8 in (59.3 m) length overall; 173 ft 8 in (52.9 m) LBP
- Beam: 25 ft 1 in (7.6 m)
- Draft: 12 ft 11.5 in (3.9 m) (mean)
- Depth of hold: 14 ft (4.3 m)
- Speed: 12 kn (14 mph; 22 km/h) (maximum); 11 kn (13 mph; 20 km/h) (cruising)
- Range: 2,000 nmi (2,300 mi; 3,700 km)
- Crew: Yacht: 26; U.S. Navy: 2 officers, 32 men
- Armament: 2 × 3 inch, 50 caliber guns; 2 × machine guns (Note: DANFS differs, Navy Construction & Repair Bureau's Ships' Data U.S. Naval Vessels of 1918 considered more likely accurate.)
- Notes: Years of name, ownership and registry changes indicated by annual registers covering U.S. fiscal years, 1 July—30 June.

USS Owera (SP-167), was an armed yacht that served in the United States Navy as a patrol vessel from 1917 to 1919. The vessel, under the name O-We-Ra, was built as a steam yacht in Leith, Scotland in 1907 for Frederick H. Stevens of Buffalo, New York. In 1915 the yacht was sold to United States Senator Peter G. Gerry of Rhode Island and registered in Providence, Rhode Island as Owera. (Note: The difference between "O-We-Ra" and "Owera" is perhaps between British and American English, though maintained in the register as a different name. In early and later use whenever the vessel has British registry association it is O-We-Ra and Owera in the United States. The only indication that this difference is anything more than an artifact of press reporting is the fact that Merchant Vessels of the United States registry, with names as formally documented, shows the difference in former names lists.)

Owera remained under Gerry's ownership through the Navy's free lease and after until sold to George W. C. Drexel of Philadelphia between publication of the United States register of 30 June 1926 and that of 30 June 1927 to become one of his series of yachts named Alcedo. By publication of the 30 June 1928 register the vessel had been sold to British interests as Josephine and left U.S. registry. By 30 June 1930 the vessel was again registered in the U.S. as O-We-Ra under ownership of Edmund S. Burke of New York until sometime before 30 June 1934 when it appears as South Wind owned by the South Wind Corporation, New York until the 1936 register when South Wind is sold into British ownership.

Traces of the vessel, again O-We-Ra, show location in Canada and then becoming an armed yacht with Royal Navy service during World War II with final naval service in Trinidad. (Note: There are references to HMS O-We-Ra but official status is not clear.) After the war the vessel appears to have had a commercial role until it disappears from registries in 1966.

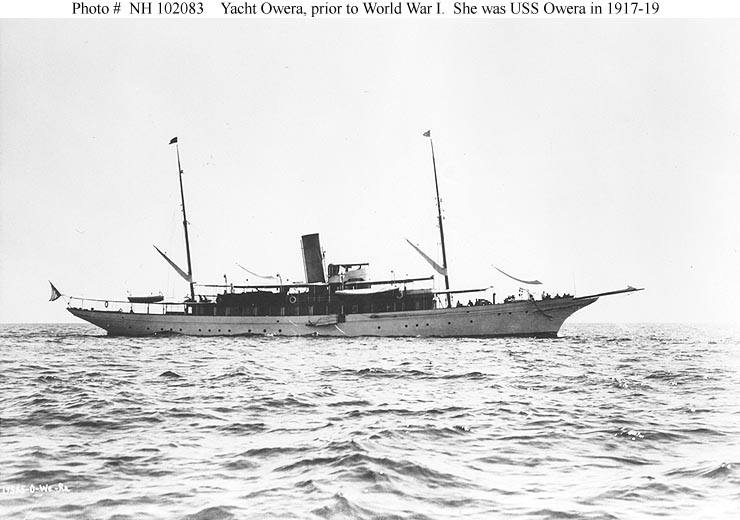
Owera as a civilian yacht sometime between 1907 and 1917.

== Construction ==
The steam yacht, designed by Cox & King, London, was launched as hull number 207 by Ramage & Ferguson, Leith, Scotland on 2 November 1906 as O-We-Ra, and completed in 1907 for Frederick H. Stevens of Buffalo and New York City.

The yacht's characteristics, from later United States official documents, were for a steel-hulled steam yacht of 426 GRT with a length of 194 ft 8 in (59.3 m) length overall, 173 ft 8 in (52.9 m) length between perpendiculars, 25 ft 1 in (7.6 m) breadth, depth of 14 ft (4.3 m) and mean draft of 12 ft 11.5 in (3.9 m). The 1918 Navy ship's data information lists a top speed of 12 kn (14 mph; 22 km/h), cruising speed of 11 kn (13 mph; 20 km/h) and a cruising range of 2,000 nmi (2,300 mi; 3,700 km). One single ended boiler provided steam to drive a triple expansion engine rated at 600 horsepower. The registration indicated a crew of twenty-six as a yacht.

The Gas Engine & Power Company & Charles L. Seabury Company of New York was contracted to build 20 ft (6.1 m) and 25 ft (7.6 m) launches, a pair of 22 ft (6.7 m) lifeboats, all of mahogany, and 14 ft (4.3 m) and 16 ft (4.9 m) dinghies to be shipped to Southampton, England for O-We-Ra.

== Stevens Yacht ==
O-We-Ra was initially registered at Leith on 19 February 1907 as a British vessel, with Official Number 123023, though this only lasted until 1908. She appears to be registered outside U.S.A., not showing in the American register until 1915. (Note: Merchant Vessels of the United States 1908 through 1915 appear to have no mention under either version of the name or the official number and signal letters that first appear in the register covering 1 July 1915 — 30 June 1916.) The yacht possibly operated on both sides of the Atlantic in earliest operation.O-We-Ra was subject of paintings in the Bay of Naples, but shows in notes operating in North American waters in 1907 and 1911. A mention is made of "Frederick H. Stevens's new Owera" being present among observers at a racing event in Long Island Sound in July 1907. The yacht was in the Hudson–Fulton Celebration naval parade on the opening day, 25 September 1909. The yacht, listed as Owera, F. H. Stevens, was in the Second Squadron — Steam Yachts, Second Division of the all day parade of vessels and small craft.

She does officially appear in 1911 with regard to foreign built yachts, owned by U.S. citizens on 1 September 1909 when a tax of $7.00 per gross ton was levied and owners were challenging the law's validity to the United States Supreme Court. (Note: The report does not include the yacht under any list of vessels registered in the U.S. including one of steam vessels by tonnage including that of O-We-Ra.) An early mention also has a possible connection with the yacht's next owner. In 1911 Stevens chartered the yacht to Senator Nelson W. Aldrich of Rhode Island for use between his summer home in New York and "an extended cruise east."

== Gerry Yacht ==
In 1915 Stevens sold the yacht to Senator Peter G. Gerry of Rhode Island at which time the yacht first appeared in the United States Registry covering 1 July 1915 to 30 June 1916 as Owera, official number 212974 with signal letters LFGP, port of registry Providence, Rhode Island. The Social Register for summer of 1915, under "Yachts in Commission," lists O-We-Ra for Stevens and Owera for Gerry indicating the transition took place in mid 1915.

O-We-Ra departed on 6 March 1915 for Washington, D.C. to join her new owner with plans to proceed on to the Pacific coast. It appears instead that Gerry joined the yacht later at Charleston, South Carolina, 19 March, where Senator Aldrich had also just arrived in Nirvana which was on the way north from the West Indies. O-We-Ra, with new owner Gerry, was bound for the West Indies then through the Panama Canal to San Francisco. On 8 June 1916 Owera was reported departing the previous day for the north after awaiting at anchor several days in Washington's harbor for the Senator.

== World War I service ==
With the United States entry into World War I Senator Gerry offered the yacht to the Navy but found that required a contract that would be illegal under current law and an action resulting in heavy fines. The transaction required passage of an act exempting the Senator, Secretary of the Navy and all other officials involved from the law prohibiting contracting between legislators and government agencies. That act was approved 12 May 1917.

The U.S. Navy acquired her from her owner Senator Gerry under free lease for service as a patrol vessel commissioned on 15 June 1917 as USS Owera (SP-167). The Navy formally leased her from Senator Gerry on 18 June 1917. The converted yacht's Naval crew was thirty-four, two of them officers. Armament is shown in Navy documents of the time as being two 3 inch, 50 caliber guns, a heavier and more capable gun than those in later descriptions of the guns as 6-pounders. All references show two machine guns.

Operating in the 2nd Naval District out of Newport, Rhode Island, during World War I, Owera patrolled in the experimental submarine zone in Long Island Sound off New London, Connecticut, through most of her U.S. Navy career. Her duties included towing torpedo targets for submarine target practice.

In October 1918 Owera steamed to the Philadelphia Navy Yard at Philadelphia, Pennsylvania, thence, after a run to Boston, Massachusetts, operated in the Delaware Bay area in the 4th Naval District. Proceeding to the New York Navy Yard in Brooklyn, New York, in November 1918, Owera was decommissioned on 6 January 1919.

== Return to private operation ==
On 8 January 1919 the yacht was returned to Senator Gerry at New York City. The yacht remained under the ownership of Gerry into the registry published 30 June 1926 but is shown in the next issue, 1 July 1926 to 30 June 1927 as being owned by George W. C. Drexel of Philadelphia and renamed Alcedo. Drexel had been owner of an earlier and larger yacht of that name, sunk during the war, as USS Alcedo (SP-166).

Drexel's ownership was not prolonged as Alcedo was sold during the first half of 1928 to Canadian businessman James Playfair of Midland, Ontario, placed under the management of Frank M Ross, Montreal and renamed Josephine; the choice of Newcastle for her port of registry is unexplained This ownership was even shorter as the following year the yacht again reappears in the U.S. registry for 1 July 1929 to 30 June 1930, again documented as O-We-Ra, owned by Edmund S. Burke of New York. O-We-Ra owned by Burke is shown in the register through 30 June 1933 but in the next register, through 30 June 1934, appears as South Wind with new signal letters KLKJ, owned by the South Wind Corporation, New York, and noting former names as "British steam yacht O-We-Ra, Owera, Alcedo, Josephine and Owera". That status continues until the 1935—1936 register when South Wind is shown as sold onto the British register.

== Commercial service and World War II ==
As before, the British-flag owners were Canadian. In early 1936 the yacht reverted to the earlier British name O-We-Ra, in the ownership of the Straits Shipping & Contracting Co Ltd of Sydney, Nova Scotia, under the management of Wentworth N Macdonald though, again, registered in the UK, this time in London. She was converted for local passenger and freight services between Cape Breton Island and the Nova Scotia mainland, serving Sydney, Mulgrave and Canso. A postcard photo mailed on 6 August 1940, titled "SS O-We-Ra leaving Mulgrave", showing a vessel almost unchanged externally from her appearance as USS Owera.

On 10 May 1940, O-We-Ra was requisitioned by the Admiralty for Royal Navy service during World War II as an auxiliary patrol yacht. Deployment included a period as an examination vessel at Trinidad. After the war, in 1946, O-We-Ra was released from naval service and returned to her owners in Nova Scotia.

Resuming her Nova Scotia coastal services, O-Re-Wa was, in 1950, transferred to ownership of the Canso Shipping, Fishing & Industries Ltd of Sydney NS, and continued operating until she failed a safety examination in 1952 and was laid up. Later, she sank at her berth. In 1967, during the clearing of wrecks from Sydney harbour, the remains of O-We-Ra were raised, and then scrapped.
