= Thomas Washington =

World War I US Navy admiral

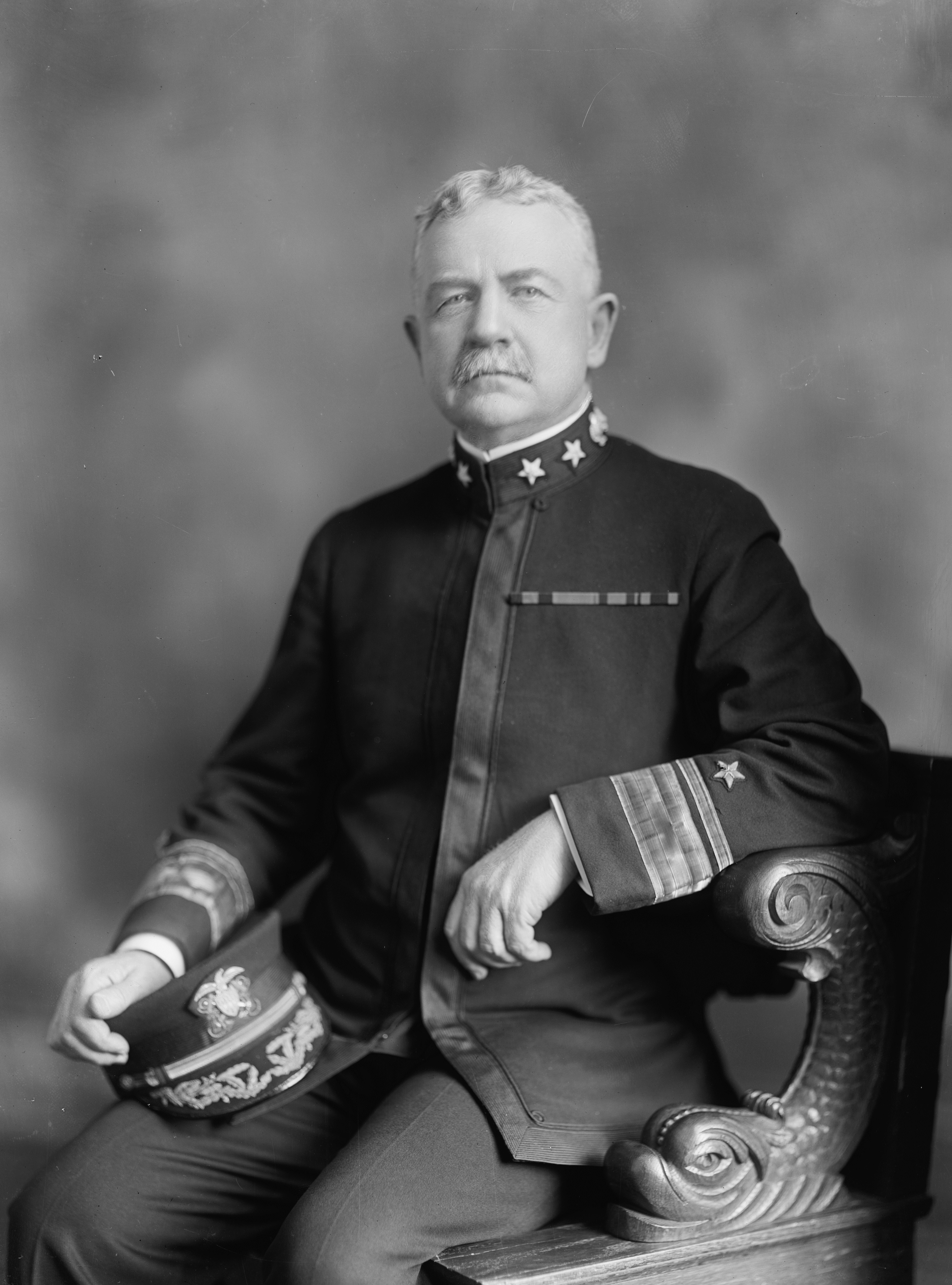
- Thomas Washington as Rear Admiral
- Born: June 6, 1865; Goldsboro, North Carolina, US
- Died: December 15, 1954 (aged 89); Bethesda Naval Hospital, Maryland, US
- Burial place: Arlington National Cemetery
- Military career
- Allegiance: United States of America
- Branch: United States Navy
- Service years: 1889–1929
- Rank: Admiral
- Commands: Dolphin; Yorktown; Charleston; Denver; Florida; Division 3, Battleship Force 1, Atlantic Fleet; Division 2, Atlantic Fleet; Division 4, Atlantic Fleet; Asiatic Fleet
- Conflicts: Spanish–American War; World War I
- Awards: Navy Distinguished Service Medal

Thomas Washington (6 June 1865 – 15 December 1954) was an admiral in the United States Navy during World War I.

== Early life and career ==
Thomas Washington was the son of James Augustus Washington and his wife Virginia Pope, born at Goldsboro, North Carolina. On May 17, 1883, Thomas Washington accepted an appointment to the United States Naval Academy. He traveled to Annapolis, Maryland, and graduated on 10 June 1887. After the required two years of sea duty during which he served on the European Station in the sloops Enterprise and Lancaster, he was commissioned ensign in 1889. Over the ensuing three years, he briefly served aboard the United States Coast and Geodetic Survey ship Endeavor, followed by a tour in the gunboat Alliance to the Far East. He was assigned to the office of the Navy's Judge Advocate General in 1892.

Subsequently, after duty on several trial boards for general courts martial at the Norfolk and Washington Navy Yards, he was assigned to a succession of ships—Montgomery (C-9), Terror (BM-4) and Patterson (DD-36)—before joining the battleship Indiana (BB-1) in early 1898. He was on this ship when she helped to defeat the Spanish Fleet under Admiral Cervera on 3 July 1898 in the Battle of Santiago de Cuba. His younger brother and naval cadet, Pope Washington, was one of the survivors of the explosion of the Maine.

After a second tour of duty ashore in the office of the Judge Advocate General, Washington served on the General Board. Ordered thence to the Asiatic Station, he joined the staff of Rear Admiral Robley D. "Fighting Bob" Evans, the Commander-in-Chief, Asiatic Fleet, on 29 October 1902. Quartered on the battleship Illinois (BB-7), the Asiatic Fleet's flagship, he remained on Evans' staff until detached on 1 June 1904.

Special duty at the Bureau of Navigation followed his return from the Orient and preceded his assuming command of dispatch boat Dolphin (PG-24), the vessel which was then serving as the Secretary of the Navy's yacht. Washington next put in another tour with the Bureau of Navigation for duty before returning to sea in 1912 to command, in turn, the gunboat Yorktown and cruisers Charleston (C-22) and Denver (C-14) over the next two years.

== World War I ==
On 20 April 1914, Washington—by then a captain—assumed the duties of Hydrographer of the Navy. World War I broke out in Europe less than four months after Washington assumed the Hydrographer's duties, depriving the United States of its external sources of oceanographic and hydrographic information. Washington and his small staff responded by independently gathering the necessary data for use by the United States Navy and Merchant Marine.

Relieved as hydrographer on 23 June 1916, Washington was given command of the battleship Florida (BB-30). A few months after the United States entered the war in the spring of 1917, Florida crossed the Atlantic with Battleship Division Nine to operate with the British Grand Fleet. The manner in which he carried out this assignment won Washington the Distinguished Service Medal for "exceptionally meritorious service in a duty of great responsibility."

== Post-war service ==
On 22 November 1918, eleven days after the Armistice, he assumed command of Flagship Division 3, Battleship Force 1, Atlantic Fleet, flying his "flag" alternately in yachts Aramis (SP-418) and Nokomis (SP-609). He subsequently commanded Divisions 2 and 4, successively, of the Atlantic Fleet. Detached from this duty on 9 August, he assumed the post of Chief of the Bureau of Navigation on 11 August, with the accompanying rank of rear admiral.

Less than a year later, Washington received orders to duty as Commander-in-Chief, Asiatic Fleet (CINCAF). He broke his flag in armored cruiser Huron (CA-9) on 11 October 1923 and commanded the Fleet until 14 October 1925. During his tour, the Asiatic Fleet provided support for the United States Army's round-the-world flight in the spring of 1924. Operating from the Kurils to Calcutta, the destroyer squadrons of the Fleet sailed on plane-guard stations, transported supplies and spare parts, and provided radio bearings and communications services for the planes, and thus contributed greatly to the success of the flight.

Relieved as CINCAF on 14 October 1925, Washington became Commandant of the Naval Operating Base, San Francisco, California, on 19 November 1925, and filled the billet until his retirement on 6 June 1929.

== Last years and legacy ==
In the 1930s Washington was the Governor of the Philadelphia Naval Home. Advanced on the retired list to the full rank of admiral on 16 July 1942, Washington died at the Bethesda Naval Hospital, Bethesda, Maryland on December 15, 1954.

He was buried at Arlington National Cemetery in Arlington, Virginia.

== Namesake ==
- The oceanographic research ship USNS Thomas Washington (T-AGOR-10) was named for him.

== See also ==
- List of United States Navy four-star admirals

Military offices
Preceded by Edwin Anderson, Jr.	Commander-in-Chief, United States Asiatic Fleet; 11 October 1923–14 October 1925	Succeeded by Clarence S. Williams
