= USS Saturn (AG-4) =

Collier of the United States Navy

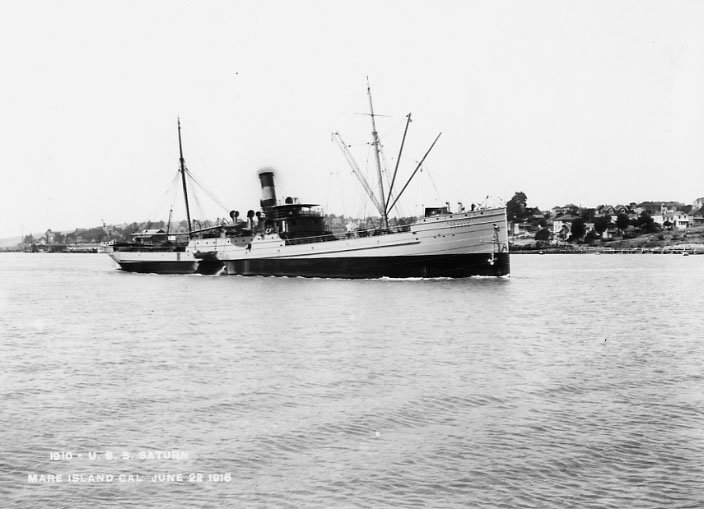

History

United States
- Name: USS Saturn
- Builder: Harlan & Hollingsworth Company, Wilmington, Delaware
- Launched: 1890
- Acquired: 2 April 1898
- Commissioned: 11 April 1898
- Decommissioned: 17 March 1922
- Reclassified: AG-4, 17 July 1920
- Fate: Sold, 25 September 1922

General characteristics
- Type: Collier
- Displacement: 4,840 long tons (4,918 t)
- Length: 297 ft 1 in (90.55 m)
- Beam: 40 ft 5 in (12.32 m)
- Draft: 23 ft 1 in (7.04 m)
- Speed: 11 knots (20 km/h; 13 mph)
- Complement: 74
- Armament: 1 × 6-pounder gun

The first USS Saturn (AG-4) was an iron collier in the United States Navy.

Saturn was launched during 1890 by Harlan & Hollingsworth Company, Wilmington, Delaware; was purchased on 2 April 1898 by the United States Navy from the Boston Towboat Company for service in the Spanish–American War; and commissioned on 11 April 1898.

== Service history ==
=== Spanish–American War, 1898 ===
Departing from Brooklyn, New York, on 11 April 1898, Saturn steamed south to Key West. Carrying coal for United States Navy ships operating against Spanish forces in the Caribbean, Saturn called at Cienfuegos, Cuba, at ports in Haiti and Puerto Rico, and at St. Thomas, Danish West Indies, before the war ended. She returned to Norfolk, Virginia on 1 September 1898 and was decommissioned there on 4 November and placed in reserve.

=== Asiatic Squadron, 1900–1903 ===
Recommissioned on 15 August 1900, Saturn departed from Norfolk on that day to join the Asiatic Squadron. Visiting Gibraltar, Port Said, Aden, and Singapore, Saturn arrived at Cavite, Luzon, Philippines, on 10 October 1900. The collier, based at Philippine ports, operated in East Asian waters into 1903, but usually was stationed for months at a time at Chefoo and Woosung, China; Nagasaki, Japan; and Hong Kong. Detached on 5 March 1903 from the Asiatic Fleet, the ship arrived at Bremerton, Washington, on 25 April and was decommissioned there on 30 June 1903 and placed in reserve.

=== Pacific Fleet, 1903–1916 ===
Saturn was placed in service on 2 December 1903 on a merchant basis and attached to the Pacific Squadron the same day. She operated on the United States west coast, from San Diego, California to Blaine, Washington, into 1908. She made one voyage to Kiska and Dutch Harbor, Alaska, during mid-1904, and another to Honolulu and Midway Island in January 1906, carrying coal for shore facilities. She also cruised in Mexican waters during January, April, July, and August 1907, supplying ships of the fleet.

Saturn was assigned to the Pacific Torpedo Flotilla on 1 December 1908. She cruised along the southern California and Mexican coast into 1911, returning to Puget Sound Navy Yard on 22 August 1911. Saturn was placed out of service there on 30 September and returned to the Reserve Force.

Placed in service again on 3 August 1912, Saturn returned to duty with the Pacific Fleet. She operated out of California, Washington, and Mexican ports supporting fleet activities until placed in reserve on 31 July 1913 at Puget Sound Naval Shipyard. Saturn was placed in service on 4 April 1914 and deployed to Mexican waters to protect United States citizens while the Mexican political situation deteriorated. Saturn spent much of 1914 anchored at Mazatlán, Manzanillo, and La Paz, Mexico, and returned to United States waters early in the following year. The collier remained in service in waters from Mexico to Washington into September 1916.

=== Alaska, 1916–1920 ===
Saturn departed Bremerton on 2 September 1916 for Sitka, Alaska, to operate as a tender and relay ship for radio communication between Alaska and bases on the United States west coast. She cruised extensively in waters of the North Pacific and was placed in full commission on 4 April 1917 upon United States entry into World War I. She called frequently at Seward, Sitka, Tatoosh, Ketchikan, and Dutch Harbor, insuring continuous communications between the continental United States and the Alaska Territory.

During November 1918, Saturn was assigned special duty carrying coal and supplies to the United States Expeditionary Force at Vladivostok, Russia, during the Russian Civil War and large-scale Japanese intervention. She departed Vladivostok on 12 January 1919 and proceeded homeward via Olongapo, Philippine Islands; Guam; and Pearl Harbor, arriving on 25 February at Mare Island Navy Yard. Saturn resumed duty as a communications link between Alaska and the continental United States, with occasional additional duty as a radio repair ship. She was classified AG-4 as a miscellaneous auxiliary on 17 July 1920.

=== Decommissioning and sale ===
Relieved of her duty at the end of 1921, she departed Mare Island on 19 January 1922, transited the Panama Canal, and reached League Island, Philadelphia, Pennsylvania, on 16 February. Decommissioned on 17 March 1922, Saturn was sold on 25 September 1922 to Joseph G. Hitner of Philadelphia, and scrapped.
