= USS Arethusa (AO-7) =

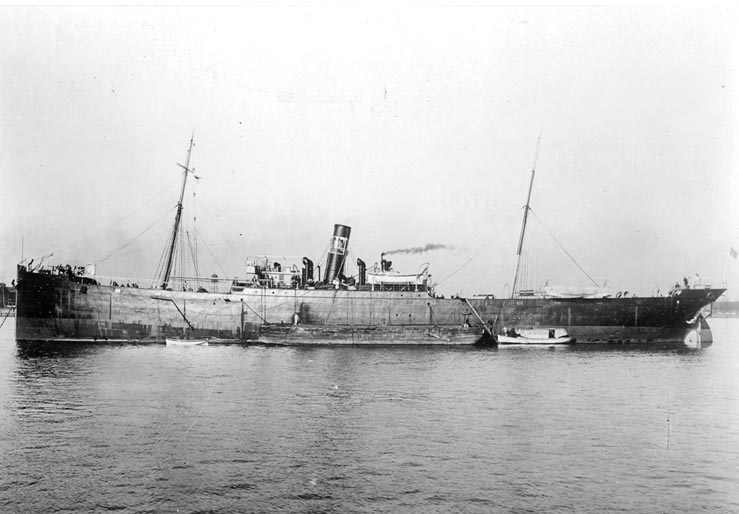
- USS Arethusa in about 1898

History
- Name: 1893: Luciline; 1898: USS Arethusa; 1927: Arethusa
- Owner: 1893: Petroleum Shipping Co of London; 1897: European Petroleum Co; 1898: United States Navy
- Operator: 1893: A Stuart
- Port of registry: 1893: (United Kingdom of Great Britain and Ireland) London; 1928: (United States) Boston
- Builder: Craig, Taylor & Co Ltd, Stockton
- Yard number: 33
- Launched: 4 March 1893
- Completed: April 1893
- Acquired: 12 August 1898
- Commissioned: (US Navy): 12 August 1898; 22 August 1900; 29 November 1906; 9 January 1918
- Decommissioned: (US Navy): 1 February 1899; 16 March 1906; 15 October 1909; 28 June 1922
- In service: 15 October 1909 (US Navy)
- Out of service: 9 January 1918 (US Navy)
- Identification: UK official number 101986; UK code letters NBJV; By 1918: w/t call sign NBU
- Fate: Sold on 7 July 1927

General characteristics
- Type: 1893: oil tanker; 1902: water boat; 1910: fleet oiler; 1927: hulk
- Tonnage: 3,319 GRT, 2,132 NRT
- Length: 332.0 ft (101.2 m)
- Beam: 42.4 ft (12.9 m)
- Depth: 18.8 ft (5.7 m)
- Installed power: 300 NHP
- Propulsion: triple expansion engine

USS Arethusa (AO-7) was a steamship that was built in England in 1893 as the civilian oil tanker Luciline. The United States Navy bought her in 1898, and later had her converted into a Fleet oiler. She was sold back into civilian ownership in 1927, and by 1928 she was a civilian hulk in Boston.

== Building ==
Craig, Taylor & Company built Luciline in Stockton-on-Tees, County Durham, as yard number 33. She was launched on 4 March 1893 and completed that April. Her construction was a mixture of iron and steel. Her registered length was 332.0 ft (101.2 m), her beam was 42.4 ft (12.9 m) and her depth was 18.8 ft (5.7 m). Her tonnages were 3,319 GRT and 2,132 NRT.

Luciline had a single screw, driven by a three-cylinder triple expansion engine that was built by J Dickinson & Sons of Sunderland and rated at 300 NHP.

Luciline's first owner was the Petroleum Shipping Company of London, who registered her in London and appointed A Stuart to manage her. Her UK official number was 101986 and her code letters were NBJV.

== Spanish–American War ==
The US Navy bought Luciline on 12 August 1898 to support the Fleet in the Spanish–American War. She was commissioned as USS Arethusa at the Philadelphia Navy Yard.

After fitting out, the ship left Philadelphia on 16 December, headed for the West Indies, anchored off Havana on Christmas Day, and provided water for US warships operating in the area until leaving for home on 14 January 1899. She reached Philadelphia on the 18th and was decommissioned there on 1 February.

Recommissioned on 22 August 1900, she sailed for the Far East via the Atlantic, Mediterranean, Indian Ocean, and arrived on the Asiatic Station early in December of that year. She supplied water and supplies to US warships and, in 1901, she took relief supplies to Guam. In the first half of the following year, she made several trips to the Philippines taking passengers and supplies to Olongapo, Luzon. After one of these runs, she arrived at Manila on 4 July 1902 and prepared for the voyage home. Getting underway on 9 August, she retraced the same general route she had used in coming to the Orient and stopped at Singapore and Aden en route to the Suez Canal which she reached on 15 September. Departing Port Said, Egypt on the 17th, she emerged from the Strait of Gibraltar 10 days later and reached Tompkinsville, NY, on Columbus Day.

Some two months of operations preceded her arrival at Culebra, Puerto Rico on 14 December 1902. For most of the first half of 1903, Arethusa operated at San Juan and Ponce, before returning to Culebra on 14 June. She then began a long tour of duty as a "water boat" there which ended early in 1906 when she moored at Philadelphia to be placed out of service on 16 March.

== Support ship for the Great White Fleet ==
The ship was given a civilian crew and, on 17 July, began providing water to ships of the Atlantic Fleet. On 29 November, she received a new naval complement and was recommissioned to serve with the small group of auxiliaries that had been selected to support the Great White Fleet in its forthcoming cruise around the world. After being fitted out at the Norfolk Navy Yard, the ship moved to Lambert's Point, Virginia on 9 December 1907 and, two days later, sailed for the Pacific.

Proceeding down the Atlantic coast of South America, she rounded Cape Horn and steamed north to the Mare Island Navy Yard which she reached on 30 April 1908. Following voyage repairs and replenishment, Arethusa left the California coast on 17 June and reached Honolulu on the 30th.

However, her service with the Great White Fleet did not take the ship beyond Hawaiian waters. Instead, she was reassigned to the Pacific Fleet, and on 30 July she got underway for San Francisco. She arrived at that port on 10 August, and remained in that vicinity until sailing on 1 October for Magdalena Bay, Mexico, where she anchored on the 6th and began supplying American warships there. In this period, she served briefly as the flagship of the Pacific Torpedo Flotilla. Her hold emptied, the ship got underway for San Francisco on 1 October, and – after reentering the Golden Gate – operated in nearby waters until decommissioned at Mare Island on 15 October 1909.

That same day, she was placed in service under a civilian crew and began preparations for a voyage back to the east coast. After departing San Francisco on 7 January 1910, she again sailed around South America and reached Hampton Roads on 29 March. Based at Norfolk, she bunkered the ships of the Atlantic Fleet, primarily torpedo boat destroyers. She continued this duty until after the United States entered World War I in 1917, filling her tanks with oil at ports along the Gulf coast and delivering it to bases in the Caribbean and on the Atlantic seaboard. In this phase of her career, she served with the fleet gathered off Veracruz, Mexico from 30 April – 7 June 1914.

== World War I ==
By 1918 Arethusa was equipped for wireless telegraphy. Her call sign was NBU.

Recommissioned on 9 January 1918 for service in the Naval Overseas Transportation Service, Arethusa carried oil from the New York Navy Yard to the Azores where she issued it to destroyers and submarines. Upon returning to New York on 5 March, she spent more than a month undergoing repairs before sailing on 10 April.

On 15 April, Arethusa departed Bermuda for the Azores in a group that consisted of some 40 Allied ships led by the light cruiser Salem. Shortly after leaving port, Arethusa collided with submarine HMS H-14, necessitating H-14's return to Bermuda. The fleet tug Conestoga towed H-14 back to Bermuda on 18 April.

Arethusa reached the Azores on the 27th and, but for a brief run to Bermuda and back in mid-May, operated there until returning to New York on 10 June. On 28 June, she began another mid-Atlantic deployment which took her twice to Bermuda and once to the Azores before she refilled her tanks at Port Arthur, Texas for another cargo of fuel oil which she once more issued in the Azores and at Bermuda before putting in at New York on 22 December, one month and 11 days after the signing of the Armistice stopped the fighting of World War I.

== Postwar ==
At New York, she filled her cargo tanks before sailing on 3 January 1919 for France. After topping off the fuel tanks of destroyers and submarine chasers operating out of Marseille, she headed for the Portuguese coast on 13 March and reached Lisbon on the 16th. From that port, she headed home via Gibraltar, the Azores, and Bermuda, supplying oil to warships whose bunkers were low, and arrived at Charleston, South Carolina, on 14 May. The following day, she entered the navy yard there for a thorough overhaul.

In the ensuing three years of peacetime operations — primarily carrying oil from gulf ports to bases on the Atlantic seaboard — the ship was classified an oiler on 17 July 1920 and designated AO-7. She was decommissioned at Boston on 28 June 1922 and sold on 7 July 1927 to Mr Marshall B Hall of Boston, who had her converted into a hulk.

== Bibliography ==
- The Marconi Press Agency Ltd (1918). The Year Book of Wireless Telegraphy and Telephony. London: The Wireless Press, Ltd.
- Sieche, Erwin F (1990). "Austria-Hungary's Last Visit to the USA". Warship International. XXVII (2): 142–164. ISSN 0043-0374.
- "Steamers". Lloyd's Register of Shipping. London: Lloyd's Register of Shipping. 1894. LOY–LUC – via Internet Archive.
- "Steamers & Motorships". Lloyd's Register of British and Foreign Shipping. London: Lloyd's Register of Shipping. 1928. ARD–ARG – via Internet Archive.
