= USS Goliah =

Tugboat of the United States Navy

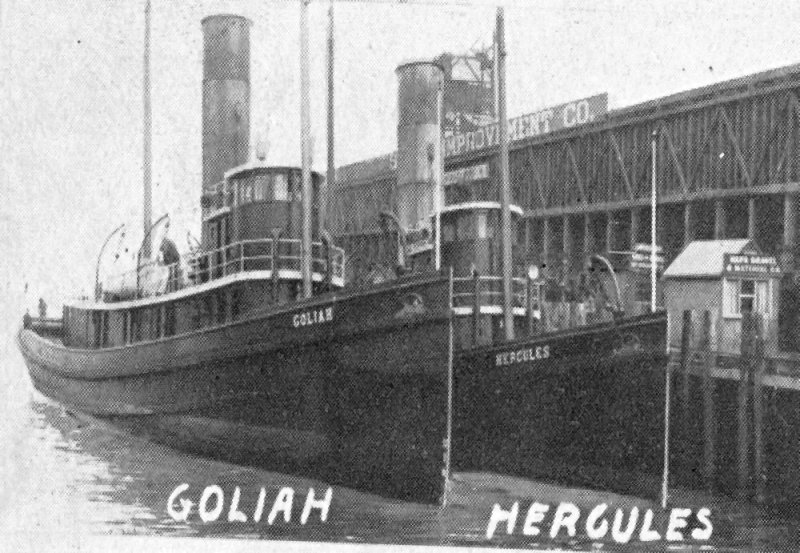
- Goliah with her sister ship, Hercules

History

United States
- Name: USS Goliah
- Namesake: Previous name retained
- Builder: John H. Dialogue and Sons, Camden, New Jersey
- Completed: 1907
- Acquired: 6 December 1917
- Commissioned: 31 January 1918
- Decommissioned: 29 November 1919
- Fate: Loaned to United States Shipping Board 30 November 1919; Transferred to United States Shipping Board 7 October 1921
- Notes: Operated as commercial tug SS Goliah 1907-1917 and from 1919

General characteristics
- Type: Tug and patrol vessel
- Tonnage: 414 tons
- Length: 135 ft (41 m)
- Beam: 27 ft 1 in (8.26 m)
- Draft: 16 ft (4.9 m)
- Propulsion: Steam engine
- Speed: 13 knots
- Armament: 1 × 3-inch (76.2-millimeter) gun; 2 × machine guns

USS Goliah (SP-1494), also listed as ID-1494, was an armed tug that served in the United States Navy as a patrol vessel and tug from 1918 to 1919.

SS Goliah was built as a commercial tug in 1907 by John H. Dialogue and Sons at Camden, New Jersey. The Navy purchased her from her owners, the Puget Sound Tug Company of Seattle, Washington, on 6 December 1917 for World War I service. She was commissioned as USS Goliah (SP-1494) on 31 January 1918 at Mare Island Navy Yard at Vallejo, California.

Following shakedown, Goliah towed coal barges between San Diego, California; Mare Island Navy Yard; and San Pedro, California, until 3 March 1918, when she departed San Diego for the United States East Coast. She arrived at Norfolk, Virginia, on 8 April 1918 and during the next month made four voyages between New London, Connecticut, and New York City with stores and ammunition. After a voyage to Bermuda and the Azores between 18 May 1918 and 24 June 1918 as an escort tug, she arrived at New York City for overhaul, where she stayed until 8 August 1918. She then briefly served at New London as a patrol craft.

Departing New London on 6 September 1918, Goliah operated as a towing ship between São Miguel Island in the Azores, Bermuda, and New London until arriving at Brest, France on 26 November 1918. There she took up new duties as a rescue and towing tug for convoys operating out of Brest to English ports and occasionally to Copenhagen, Denmark, and Lisbon, Portugal, until she arrived back at Brest on 24 April 1919.

Goliah performed harbor towing work at Brest until she was decommissioned on 29 November 1919.

The U.S. Navy loaned Goliah to the United States Shipping Board on 30 November 1919 and transferred her to the Shipping Board's permanent custody and control on 7 October 1921.
