= USS Arctic (SP-1158) =

Steam tug in the US Navy

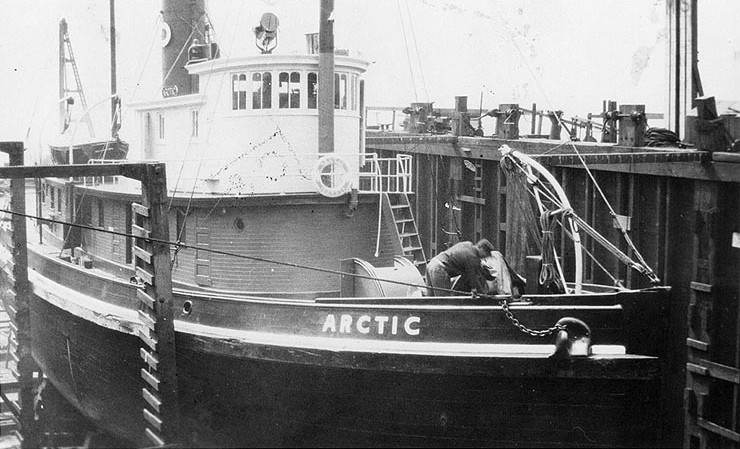
- The tugboat Arctic in drydock, prior to her commissioning into the U.S. Navy as USS Arctic (SP-1158)

History

United States
- Namesake: The Arctic
- Owner: Independent Asphalt Paving Co.; M. J. Dady Engineering and Contracting Co.
- Builder: Hall Bros (Eagle Harbor, Washington)
- Completed: 1913
- Acquired: 4 Dec 1917
- Commissioned: 15 Jan 1918
- Decommissioned: 8 Jul 1919
- Fate: Scrapped 1941

General characteristics
- Tonnage: 197 GRT
- Length: 111 ft 6 in (33.99 m)
- Beam: 25 ft 3 in (7.70 m)
- Draft: 12 ft 3 in (3.73 m) (mean)
- Installed power: 400 ihp (300 kW) compound steam engine
- Propulsion: Screw
- Speed: 10 knots (19 km/h; 12 mph)
- Complement: 25
- Armament: 1 × 3 in (76 mm) mount; 2 × mgs

USS Arctic (SP-1158) was a wooden-hulled steam tug acquired by the US Navy during World War I. Arctic was briefly employed as a convoy escort during the war and later used to tow targets and transport ammunition. She was returned to commercial service in 1919.

== Service history ==
Arctic was built by Hall Bros. at Eagle Harbor, Washington, in 1913. She was inspected by the Navy on 17 October 1917 and found to be suitable for naval service. Accordingly, her owner, the Independent Asphalt Paving Co., of Seattle, Washington, delivered the tug to the Navy on 4 December 1917. Fitted out at the Puget Sound Navy Yard, Bremerton, Washington, and designated SP-1158, Arctic was placed in commission there on 15 January 1918, LTJG Ernest G. Heinrici, USNRF, in command.

After escorting the submarine chaser USS SC-302 to San Diego, Arctic towed two coal barges through the Panama Canal and proceeded to Hampton Roads, Virginia, where she arrived early in May and began preparations for "distant service." Assigned to Division 11, Patrol Force, Arctic departed New London, Connecticut, on 18 May as one of the escorts for a convoy that included 27 submarine chasers. After shepherding her charges to Bermuda, the tug proceeded on to Ponta Delgada, in the Azores, on escort duty before returning to New London in mid-August 1918. For the remainder of the year, she operated between New London, the Azores, and Bermuda.

Assigned then to the Fleet Train, Arctic operated with the Atlantic Fleet from February to May 1919, towing targets during gunnery exercises out of Guantanamo Bay, Cuba, and transporting ammunition within the waters of the 5th Naval District. After proceeding from that port to Havana, Arctic was decommissioned on 8 July 1919, simultaneously stricken from the Naval Vessel Register, and turned over to the M. J. Dady Engineering and Contracting Co., which had purchased the vessel from her prewar owner.

After navy service, she remained named as the towboat Arctic, and was scrapped in 1941.
