= USS G-2 =

G-class submarine of the United States

Coordinates: 41°17′50″N 72°08′30″W

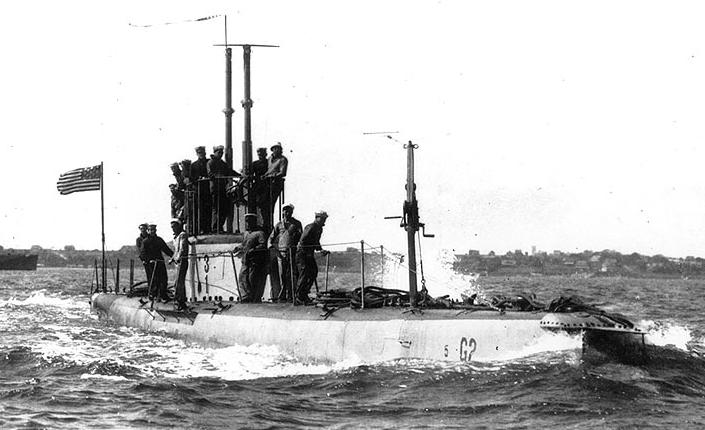
- USS G-2, ex-Tuna, underway on the surface, prior to World War I, with crewmen on deck "getting a little fresh air"

History

United States
- Name: Tuna
- Namesake: The tuna
- Builder: Lake Torpedo Boat Company, Bridgeport, Connecticut
- Cost: $479,347.46 (hull and machinery)
- Laid down: 20 October 1909
- Launched: 10 January 1912
- Sponsored by: Miss Marjorie F. Miller
- Commissioned: 28 October 1912
- Decommissioned: 2 April 1919
- Renamed: G-2 (Submarine No.27), 17 November 1911
- Stricken: 11 September 1919
- Identification: Hull symbol: SS-27 (17 July 1920); Call sign: NUT
- Fate: Sunk at her moorings, 30 July 1919

General characteristics
- Class & type: G-class submarine
- Displacement: 400 long tons (410 t) surfaced; 516 long tons (524 t) submerged
- Length: 161 ft (49 m)
- Beam: 13 ft 1 in (3.99 m)
- Draft: 12 ft 6 in (3.81 m)
- Installed power: 1,200 bhp (890 kW) (gasoline); 520 hp (390 kW) (electric)
- Propulsion: 4 × White & Middleton gasoline engines; 2 × Diehl Manufacturing Company electric motors, 2 × 60-Cell batteries; 2 × Propeller
- Speed: 14 kn (26 km/h; 16 mph) surfaced; 10.5 kn (19.4 km/h; 12.1 mph) submerged
- Range: 3,500 nmi (6,500 km; 4,000 mi) at 11 kn (20 km/h; 13 mph) on surface
- Test depth: 200 ft (61 m)
- Complement: 1 officer; 23 enlisted
- Armament: 4 × 18-inch (450 mm) torpedo tubes, (2 internal in the bow, 1 external in bow, one external stern), 8 torpedoes

USS Tuna/G-2 (SS-27), also known as "Submarine No. 27", was a G-class submarine of the United States Navy (USN). She was the first ship of the USN to be named for the tuna, a large, vigorous, spiny-finned fish highly esteemed for sport and food, though she was renamed G-2 prior to launching.

While the four G-boats were nominally all of a class, they differed enough in significant details that they are sometimes considered to be four unique boats, each in a class by herself.

== Construction ==
Tuna's keel was laid down on 20 October 1909, by the Lake Torpedo Boat Company, Bridgeport, Connecticut. She was renamed G-2 on 17 November 1911, and launched on 10 January 1912, sponsored by Ms. Marjorie F. Miller. G-2 was towed to the New York Navy Yard after the termination of the Lake contract on 7 November 1913, where she was completed, and commission on 1 December 1913.

== Service history ==
Departing New York under tow of submarine tender Ozark, ex-monitor Arkansas, the submersible torpedo boat arrived at the Naval Torpedo Station, Newport, Rhode Island, on 28 February 1914. Attached to the Atlantic Submarine Flotilla, G-2 spent the next five months conducting dive training and engineering exercises with G-1 in Long Island Sound and Narragansett Bay. During these trials the boat made six submerged runs to a maximum depth of 37 ft (11 m). Her White & Middleton gasoline engine proved troublesome and after the port armature shaft failed on 31 March, the boat was towed to New York for repairs. While there, financial considerations led to G-2 being put in reserve commission on 15 June 1914.

G-2 was placed in full commission at New York, on 6 February 1915. Attached to Division Three, Submarine Flotilla, Atlantic Fleet, the boat joined G-1, tender Fulton and tug Sonoma, for a cruise to Norfolk, Virginia, on 25 March. Arriving there two days later, the submersible conducted maneuvers in Hampton Roads before proceeding to Charleston, South Carolina, in April, arriving there on 17 April. Following a short yard period for repairs, the division proceeded back to New York, mooring alongside the 135th Street pier on 9 May.

On 18 May, G-2 joined other warships and passed in review before President Woodrow Wilson, who looked on from the yacht Mayflower. The boat then sailed to Nantucket, Massachusetts, to participate in a war problem off Block Island, before unloading her torpedoes at Newport, on 25 May. Ordered back to New York for an overhaul, the submersible again transited the familiar waters of Long Island Sound, before arriving at the mouth of the East River, on 22 June. While standing down the river with G-4, the two boats collided with submarine K-2, in an unusual three-boat accident. Fortunately, none of the boats suffered any damage. G-2 entered the Navy Yard there for an extended overhaul later that day.

Escorted to Provincetown, Massachusetts, by Ozark and tug Iwana, G-2 commenced final acceptance trials from 1–10 December. Following those successful evolutions, during which the Trial Board noted numerous items requiring modernization, the boat moved back to New York for an overhaul, on 14 January 1916. Six months later, G-2 shifted to the Lake Torpedo Boat Company yard for completion, receiving new diving rudder gear, hydroplanes, electrical wiring, and a new crankshaft. This yard work required extensive alterations and the boat did not return to service until convoyed to New London, Connecticut, by Sunbeam II, on 28 June 1917.

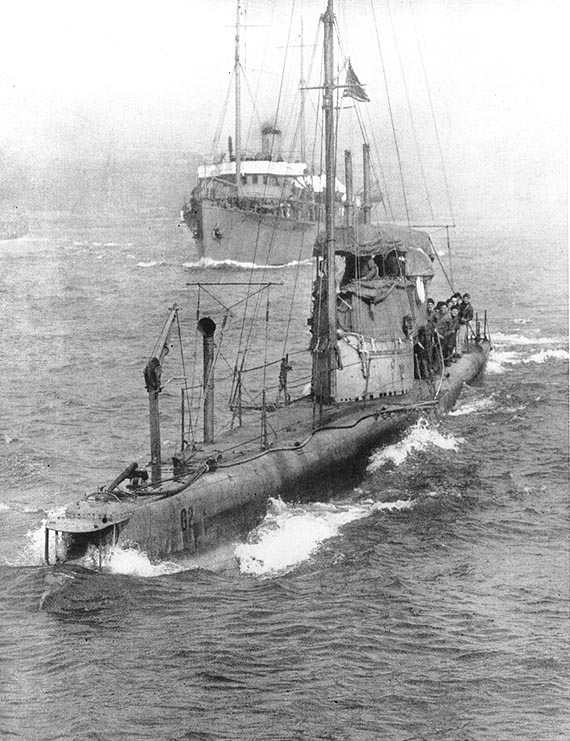
G-2 c. 1916, with Fulton following astern.

On 21 August, G-2 sailed to Boston, Massachusetts, via the Cape Cod Canal, to operate with the destroyer Aylwin, submarine chaser SC-6, and steam yacht Margaret. There the boat helped a Navy Experimental Board, embarked in Margaret, to carry out various sound detector tests in nearby waters. The submarine also conducted practice approaches and served as an instruction platform for officer and enlisted submarine students.

Shifting back to New London, on 20 October, G-2 combined work on sound detection devices with training for the newly established Submarine School off Block Island and in Long Island Sound. During seven months of operations, she experimented with magnetic detectors and dragging devices and tried out new periscopes and other submarine equipment. The boat carried out these tests with section patrol boats Wacondah and Thetis, as well as numerous subchasers. Learning of the possible proximity of German U-boats, she conducted four-day patrols off Block Island, in late June 1918, and again in mid-July.

G-2 continued schoolship duty out of New London, through the end of World War I, testing listening and flare signaling devices, among other pieces of equipment. On 30 August, for example, her crew tested the strength of the pressure hull, and the reliability of electric equipment, against depth charge explosions. On 12 September, Thetis experimented with a magnetic detector while G-2 lay on the bottom in 86 ft (26 m) of water, and in November, G-2 even conducted experimental work with patrol seaplanes. This duty ended in January 1919, when she was scheduled for inactivation.

== Fate ==
Decommissioned on 2 April 1919, the boat was designated as a target for testing depth charges and ordnance nets in Niantic, Connecticut. During inspection by a six-man maintenance crew on 30 July, the boat suddenly flooded and sank at her moorings in Two Tree Channel, near Niantic. She went down in 13.5 fathoms (81 ft; 24.7 m), drowning three of the inspection crew. Too deep and too old to salvage, the submarine was struck from the Naval Vessel Register on 11 September.

Wreck site:

== Bibliography ==
- "Table 21 - Ships on Navy List June 30, 1919". Congressional Serial Set. U.S. Government Printing Office: 764. 1921.
- Gary, Priolo. "Tuna / G-2 (SS-27)". Navsource.net.
- "G-2". Dictionary of American Naval Fighting Ships. Navy Department, Naval History and Heritage Command. 2 February 2004. This article incorporates text from this source, which is in the public domain.
- Friedman, Norman (1995). U.S. Submarines Through 1945: An Illustrated Design History. Annapolis, Maryland: Naval Institute Press. ISBN 1-55750-263-3.
- Hedman, Ric; Johnston, David (8 May 2025). "G-class".
- Hedman, Ric; Johnston, David (8 May 2025a). "Submarine Specifications".
