= United States G-class submarine =

United States Navy submarine class

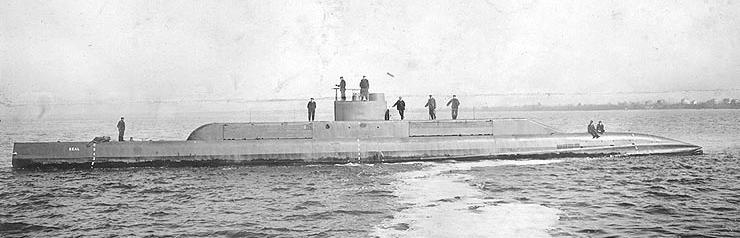
- USS Seal afloat after launching, off the Newport News Shipbuilding and Dry Dock Company shipyard, Newport News, Virginia, 8 February 1911

Class overview
- Name: G class
- Builders: Newport News Shipbuilding Company, Newport News, Virginia (G-1); Lake Torpedo Boat, Bridgeport, Connecticut (G-3 and G-2); William Cramp & Sons, Philadelphia, Pennsylvania (G-4)
- Operators: United States Navy
- Preceded by: F class
- Succeeded by: H class
- Built: 1909–1913
- In commission: 1912–1921
- Completed: 4
- Retired: 4

General characteristics
- Type: Submarine
- Displacement: 360–400 long tons (366–406 t) surfaced; 457–516 long tons (464–524 t) submerged
- Length: 157–161 ft (48–49 m)
- Beam: 13–17 ft (4.0–5.2 m)
- Draft: 11–12 ft (3.4–3.7 m)
- Installed power: 1,000–1,200 hp (750–890 kW) gasoline/diesel; 440–600 hp (330–450 kW) electric
- Propulsion: White & Middleton Company gasoline engines (G-1 and G-2); American FIAT Automobile Company gasoline engines (G-4); Busch-Sulzer Brothers Diesel Engine Company diesel engines (G-3); Diehl Manufacturing Company electric motors (all)
- Speed: 14 kn (26 km/h; 16 mph) surfaced; 9.5–10 kn (17.6–18.5 km/h; 10.9–11.5 mph) submerged
- Range: 2,500 nmi (4,600 km; 2,900 mi) at 8 kn (15 km/h; 9.2 mph) surfaced; 70 nmi (130 km; 81 mi) at 5 kn (9.3 km/h; 5.8 mph) submerged
- Test depth: 200 ft (61 m)
- Complement: 1-2 officers; 23 enlisted
- Armament: 4–6 × 18 inch (450 mm) bow torpedo tubes (4–10 torpedoes); 2 × 18 inch deck mounted torpedo tubes (G-1)

The G-class submarines were a class of four United States Navy submarines. While the four G boats were nominally all of a class, they differed enough in significant details that they are sometimes considered to be four unique boats, each in a class by herself. They were the result of agitation (presumably from industry and Congress) for competition in submarine design; all previous US submarines were designed by Electric Boat. G-1, G-2, and G-3, were designed by Simon Lake, of the Lake Torpedo Boat Company, while G-4 was designed by American Laurenti. G-1 and G-2 were built by Newport News, G-3 by Lake, completed at the New York Navy Yard due to Lake's temporary dissolution, and G-4 by Cramp.

== Design ==
G-1, G-2, and G-4 were the last gasoline engine powered submarines in the US Navy. The Lake-designed G-1 was equipped with three sets of diving planes spaced along the midships part of the hull, and no bow planes. This was to facilitate level diving, which Lake thought was safer than the angle diving of the numerous Electric Boat designs. During World War I, G-1, G-2, and G-3 were fitted with "chariot" bridge shields for improved surface operation in rough weather, although they were not deployed overseas.

G-1 was built under a contract with such high performance specifications that the Navy expected Lake to fail, so as a result the boat was not initially assigned a hull number. When Lake did eventually complete the boat, the awkwardness of the situation caused the Navy to assign the boat hull number 19½, an unprecedented move. By the time the Navy's designation system was overhauled in 1920, F-1 had been lost, so G-1 became SS-20 at that time. G-1 had four 18 inch (450 mm) torpedo tubes: two in the bow, and two in two trainable mounts in the superstructure. These mounts could only fire at angles abeam, not directly ahead or astern.

G-2 had four 18-inch torpedo tubes: two bow internal, one bow external, and one stern external, with 8 torpedoes. She had four engines installed, in tandem, two on each shaft with a clutch between them. This would create severe vibrations in operation, as it was impossible to perfectly synchronize the engines, a problem the later AA-1-class submarines experienced.

G-3 had six 18-inch torpedo tubes: two bow internal, two bow external, and two stern external, with 10 torpedoes. She was the only one of the class with diesel engines. With G-3 still on the building ways, Lake was forced to declare bankruptcy, a decision brought on by deferred payments from the two earlier boats and from poor management of the yard. The Navy moved in, launched the boat, and towed her to the Brooklyn Navy Yard where she was completed. Her post commissioning trials in 1915 showed that she had considerable issues with stability. She was returned to the now reorganized and revitalized Lake yard in Bridgeport, where she was hauled out and fitted with sponsons to each side of the hull to improve stability.

G-4 had two bow and two stern 18-inch internal torpedo tubes, with 8 torpedoes. By commissioning date she was the first US submarine with a stern tube. Four engines were installed, in tandem as in G-2, except there was no clutch between them. This created severe vibrations in operation, as it was impossible to perfectly synchronize the engines, a problem the later AA-1 class experienced. She was the only submarine built to a foreign design ever commissioned into the United States Navy.

== Boats in class ==
The following ships of the class were constructed.

Construction data
Ship name	Hull class and no.	Builder	Laid down	Launched	Comm.	Decomm.	Renamed	Rename date	Reclass. hull no.	Reclass. hull no. date	Fate
Seal	Submarine No. 19 1/2	Newport News Shipbuilding & Drydock Co., Newport News, Virginia	2 February 1909	8 February 1911	28 October 1912	6 March 1920	G-1	17 November 1911	SS-19 1/2	17 July 1920	Sunk as a target, 21 June 1921
Tuna	Submarine No. 27	Lake Torpedo Boat Company, Bridgeport, Connecticut	20 October 1909	10 January 1912	6 February 1915	2 April 1919	G-2	17 November 1911	SS-27	17 July 1920	Sunk at her moorings
Turbot	Submarine No. 31	Lake Torpedo Boat Company, Bridgeport, Connecticut	30 March 1911	27 December 1913	22 March 1915	5 May 1921	G-3	17 November 1911	SS-31	17 July 1920	Sold for scrapping, 19 April 1922
Thrasher	Submarine No. 26	William Cramp & Sons, Philadelphia, Pennsylvania	9 July 1910	15 August 1912	22 January 1914	5 September 1919	G-4	17 November 1911	SS-26	17 July 1920	sold for scrapping, 15 April 1920

== Bibliography ==
- Friedman, Norman (1995). US Submarines through 1945: An Illustrated Design History. Annapolis: Naval Institute Press. ISBN 1-55750-263-3.
- Gardiner, Robert (1985). Conway's All the World's Fighting Ships 1906–1921. Conway Maritime Press. ISBN 0-85177-245-5.
- Hedman, Ric; Johnston, David (8 May 2025). "G-class".
- Hedman, Ric; Johnston, David (13 March 2025a). "G-3".
- Hedman, Ric; Johnston, David (13 March 2025b). "G-1".
- Hedman, Ric; Johnston, David (1 December 2025c). "G-4".
- Johnston, David L. (2023). "The T-class Fleet Submarines 1916-1927: An Analysis of Failure" (PDF).
- Silverstone, Paul H. (1970). U.S. Warships of World War I. Ian Allan. ISBN 0-71100-095-6.
