= Russian submarine Svyatoy Georgy =

Russian and Soviet diesel-electric submarine

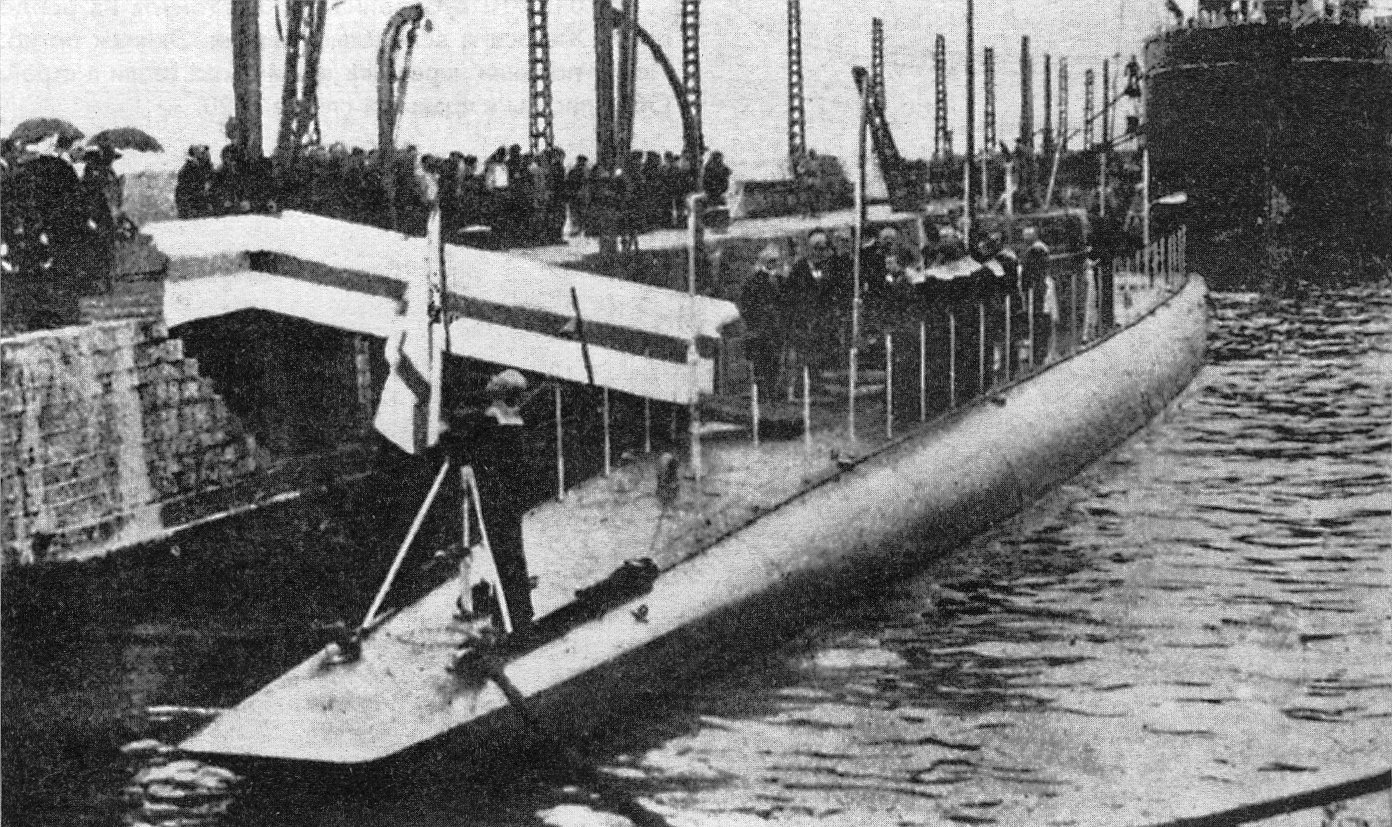
- Raising of the ensign of the Russian Navy on Svyatoy Georgy, 20 May 1917

History

Russian Empire and Republic
- Name: Svyatoy Georgy
- Namesake: Saint George
- Builder: Laurenti–Ansaldo, La Spezia
- Laid down: 1916
- Launched: January 1917
- Commissioned: 20 May 1917 (Note: O.S. 7 May)
- Fate: Left stranded on a sandbank in 1918, captured by the Red Army in February 1920

Russian SFSR and the Soviet Union
- Name: Kommunar (from 7 May 1920)
- Namesake: Communards
- Decommissioned: January 1923
- Stricken: 24 July 1924
- Fate: Used as a training hulk until 1941

General characteristics
- Type: Submarine
- Displacement: 260 tons surfaced; 305 tons submerged
- Length: 45.2 m (148 ft 4 in)
- Beam: 4.3 m (14 ft 1 in)
- Draft: 3.02 m (9 ft 11 in)
- Propulsion: Diesel-electric; 2 × 350 hp (260 kW) diesel engines; 2 × 250 hp (190 kW) electric motors; 2 shafts
- Speed: 13.4 knots (24.8 km/h) surfaced; 8.5 knots (15.7 km/h) submerged
- Range: 1,600 nmi (3,000 km) surfaced; 88 nmi (163 km) submerged
- Test depth: 45 m (148 ft)
- Complement: 19 officers and sailors
- Armament: 1 × 75 mm (3 in) deck gun; 2 × 457 mm (18 in) bow torpedo tubes

The Russian submarine Svyatoy Georgy (Russian: Святой Георгий, lit. 'Saint George') was a unique submarine built during World War I for the Imperial Russian Navy by the Italian firm Ansaldo and the engineer Cesare Laurenti. The submarine had been ordered by Russia in 1912, but the original boat was completed shortly after the outbreak of the war and entered service with the Royal Italian Navy. Russia ordered a replacement in 1915, which was laid down in 1916 and launched in January 1917. Svyatoy Georgy was completed and commissioned into the Russian Navy on 20 May 1917. The submarine's armament consisted of one deck gun and two torpedo tubes.

Svyatoy Georgy left Italy and went on a five-thousand mile voyage on its own power from the Mediterranean Sea to the port of Arkhangelsk on the coast of northern Russia, where the submarine became part of the Arctic Ocean Flotilla. The journey lasted from June to September 1917. Shortly after its arrival the submarine underwent repairs and did not see any combat against Germany. After the events of the October Revolution, during the Allied intervention in the Russian Civil War the crew took Svyatoy Georgy from Arkhangelsk along the Northern Dvina river and left it stranded on a sandbank. It was eventually recovered and entered service with the Red Navy in the White Sea, being renamed Kommunar, before its decommissioning in 1923. The submarine may have been used as a stationary training hulk until the German invasion of the Soviet Union.

== Design and construction ==
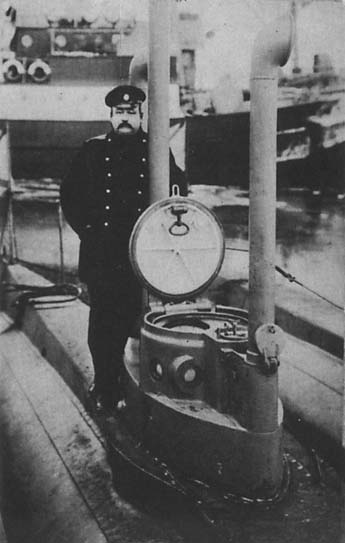
Ivan Riznich, the captain of Svyatoy Georgy

In 1912 the Russian Empire ordered a submarine from the Italian firm Fiat based on the design of the naval engineer Cesare Laurenti. It was a development on the Italian Medusa-class submarine. The boat ordered by Russia was laid down on 11 March 1913 and was launched on 5 July 1914. The Imperial Russian Navy intended to name the submarine Svyatoy Georgy. However, the outbreak of World War I and the neutrality of Italy complicated the situation. The submarine was repurposed by the Italy and entered service with the Royal Italian Navy on 18 February 1915 as Argonauta. After the Italian entry into World War I on the side of the Entente later that year Russia ordered a replacement as part of its 1915 emergency naval armament program. The second Svyatoy Georgy was laid down in 1916 and launched in January 1917 after being designed and built by Laurenti–Ansaldo in La Spezia, Italy.

Svyatoy Georgy had two Fiat 350 hp (260 kW) diesel engines for moving on the surface and two 250 hp (190 kW) electric motors for moving underwater, providing power to the submarine's two propeller shafts. This gave it a top speed of 13.4 knots (24.8 km/h; 15.4 mph) surfaced and 8.5 knots (15.7 km/h; 9.8 mph) underwater, and a range of 1,600 nmi (3,000 km) while surfaced and 88 nmi (163 km) while submerged. It had a displacement of 260 tons surfaced and 305 tons submerged, along with a length of 45.2 m (148 ft 4 in), a beam of 4.3 m (14 ft 1 in), and a draft of 3.02 m (9 ft 11 in). Its diving depth was 45 m (148 ft). The boat's armament consisted of one 75 mm (3 in) deck gun and two 457 mm (18 in) bow torpedo tubes. The crew consisted of 19 officers and men. Like all submarines designed by Laurenti, Svyatoy Georgy had a double hull, and ballast tanks were located between the two hulls.

== World War I service ==
A crew of submariners from the Arctic Ocean Flotilla, led by Senior Lieutenant Ivan I. Riznich, was sent by the Russian naval command to Italy. Riznich previously captained multiple submarines and was then serving as the commander of the flotilla's submarine division. They noted that the pipes of Svyatoy Georgy would freeze if the boat submerged in the cold northern waters, but the government saw its purpose for joining the Arctic Ocean Flotilla as that its presence would intimidate German warships from operating outside the port of Arkhangelsk. So despite the problem with the pipes, the Russian government planned to acquire another two submarines of this class for service in the northern waters.

The crew departed in February 1917 and reached Italy by ship either in March or April. After Svyatoy Georgy was commissioned into the Imperial Russian Navy on 20 May [O.S. 7 May] 1917 in La Spezia, in a ceremony that was attended by Russian diplomatic officials and Italian officers, the crew spent time in the rest of May and early June familiarizing themselves with the submarine, and also meeting with Italian officials. After this was complete they began their journey to Russia and departed from La Spezia to Genoa on 26 June [O.S. 13 June] 1917. It was the start of voyage that took the submarine over 5,000 miles.

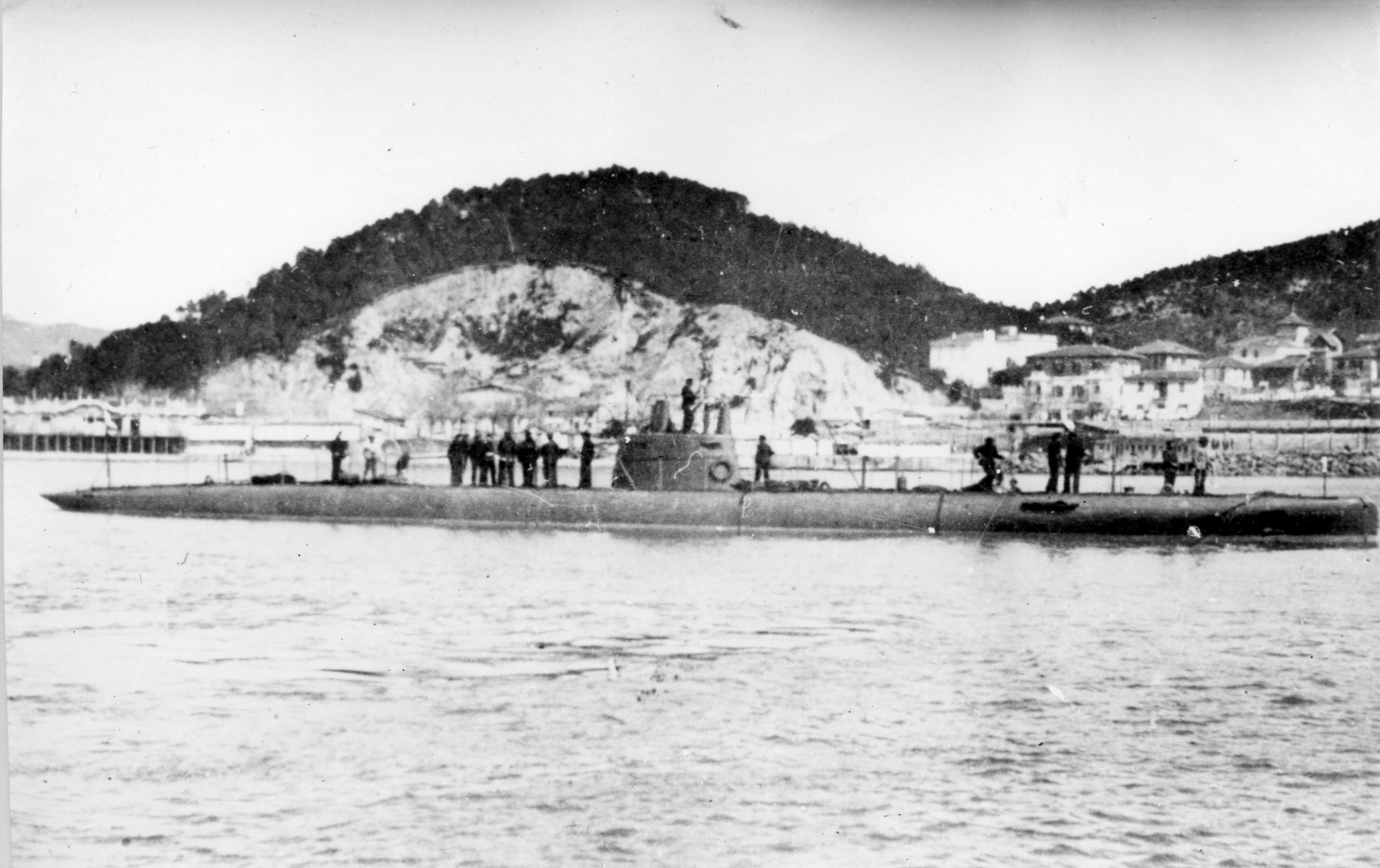
Svyatoy Georgy in the Mediterranean

After a brief stop in Genoa the submarine left Italy for Gibraltar, where they were met by the British and rested for several days before departing, and entered the Atlantic Ocean. During their time in the Atlantic the crew had to keep the hatch open for the diesel engines to receive air, which became a problem when during a storm water started getting into the submarine. They had to pump it out but had difficulty keeping up with the amount of water entering the submarine. They reached Lisbon in 19 July, and then continued before eventually reaching Plymouth in August. There Svyatoy Georgy underwent repairs before departing later that month with the British minesweeper Iceland. After passing between Ireland and Great Britain they stopped at Scapa Flow on 6 September. The submarine and the minesweeper left on the 10th for the final section of the voyage. Svyatoy Georgy had problems with its diesel engines along the way but managed to keep going at a slow speed until it finally reached Arkhangelsk on 22 September [O.S. 9 September] 1917.

The following day they were visited by Rear Admiral Vikorst, commander of the Arctic Ocean Flotilla, who delivered a message from Dmitry Verderevsky, the Minister of the Navy of the Russian Republic, congratulating Riznich and the entire crew for completing the voyage in difficult conditions. Every member of the crew was awarded the Cross of St. George and several officers received other orders. However, a commission of the Naval General Staff, after realizing that Svyatoy Georgy could not dive in the cold waters due to pipes freezing inside, recommended that the boat be transferred to either the Baltic Fleet or the Black Sea Fleet. Svyatoy Georgy did not carry out any combat operations against the Germans.

== Revolution and civil war ==
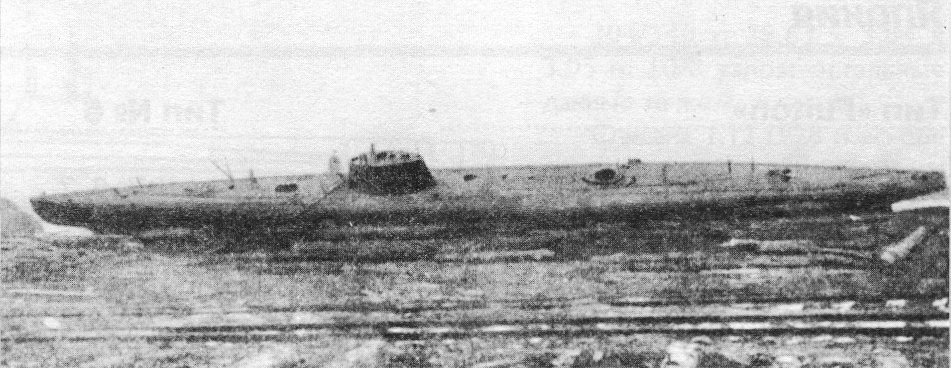
Svyatoy Georgy stranded on a sandbank on the Dvina river

In late October 1917 the boat began preparations to be put in a dry dock for maintenance, which was done on 12 November, and in the spring of 1918 they were expecting that Svyatoy Georgy would be transferred to the Baltic. Riznich remained in command. However, on 3 August 1918 the Allied intervention in the Russian Civil War reached Arkhangelsk as British troops entered the area. When they arrived, Svyatoy Georgy was taken up the Northern Dvina river and ran aground on a sandbank, where it was left by its crew. There are contradictory reports as to whether the crew was loyal to the Soviet government and did this on their orders or if it was done to try to get the submarine to the White movement. One source also says that the boat was strafed by a French aircraft. In any case, the submarine remained stranded there until it was eventually recovered by the Soviets: either in the winter of 1918–19, or in February 1920.

The Red Navy appointed Lieutenant P. I. Lazarevich as the new commander and it was renamed Kommunar in May 1920. The submarine became part of the Naval Forces of the Northern Seas within the Red Navy and remained in limited service in the White Sea until being decommissioned in January 1923. After being struck from the navy list on 24 July 1924, it was still used as part of equipment for the recovery of sunk ships by the Soviet agency EPRON, and it may have been turned into a training hulk that was in use until 1941, before being scrapped.
