= USS G-4 =

G-class submarine of the United States

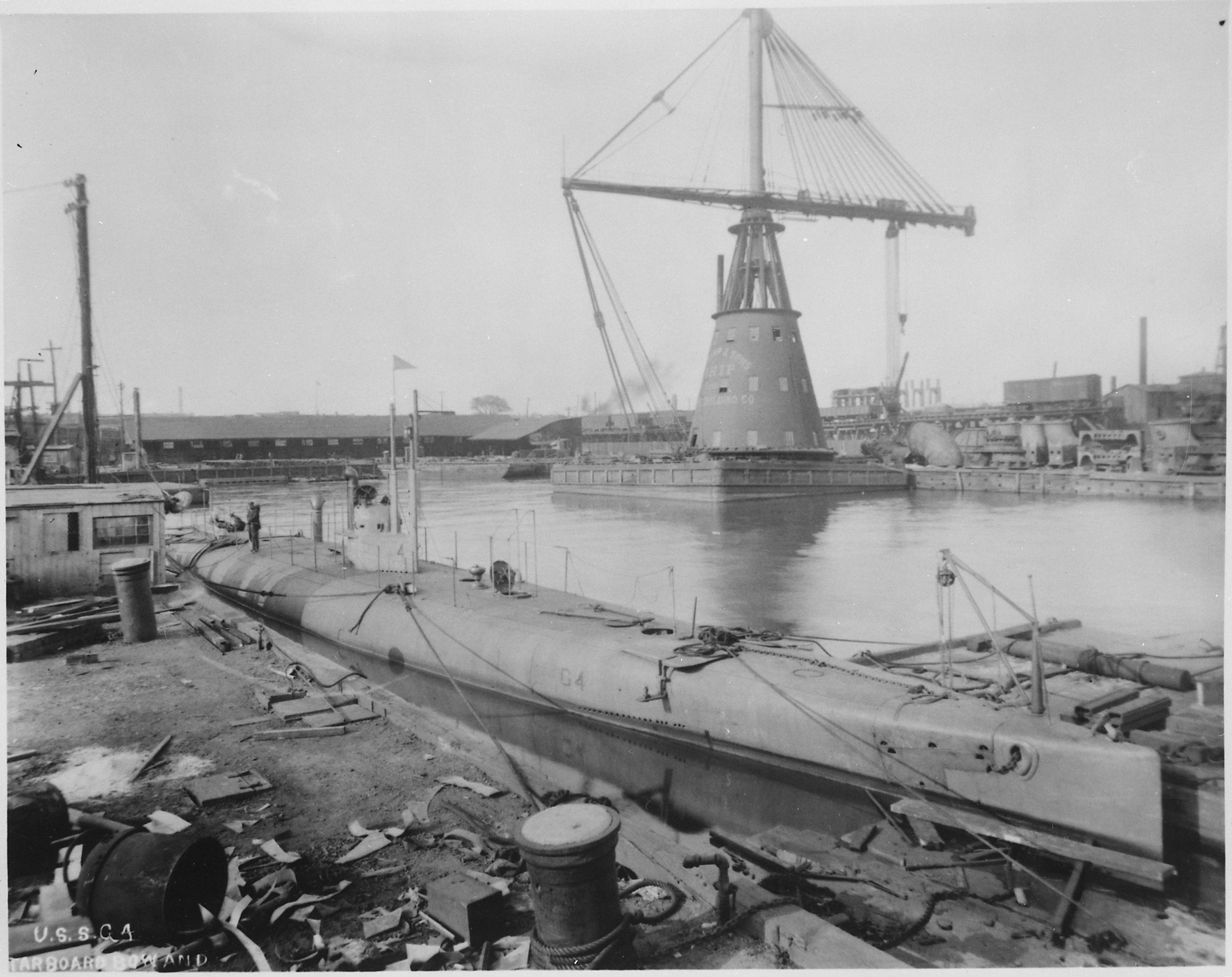
- USS G-4, ex-Thrasher, during her fitting out at the William Cramp & Sons shipyard, Philadelphia, Pennsylvania, 2 October 1912, with shipyard crane barge in the background

History

United States
- Name: Thrasher
- Namesake: The thresher shark (Note: Thrasher is an outdated spelling for the thresher shark.)
- Builder: William Cramp & Sons, Philadelphia, Pennsylvania
- Cost: $441,475.47 (hull and machinery)
- Yard number: 354
- Laid down: 9 July 1910
- Launched: 15 August 1912
- Commissioned: 22 January 1914
- Decommissioned: 5 September 1919
- Renamed: G-4 (Submarine No.26), 17 November 1911
- Stricken: 13 August 1921
- Identification: Hull symbol: SS-26 (17 July 1920); Call sign: NSL
- Fate: Sold for scrapping, 15 April 1920

General characteristics
- Class & type: G-class submarine
- Displacement: 360 long tons (370 t) surfaced; 457 long tons (464 t) submerged
- Length: 157 ft 6 in (48.01 m)
- Beam: 17 ft 6 in (5.33 m)
- Draft: 10 ft 11 in (3.33 m)
- Installed power: 1,000 bhp (750 kW) (gasoline); 440 hp (330 kW) (electric)
- Propulsion: 4 × American FIAT Automobile Company gasoline engines; 2 × Diehl Manufacturing Company electric motors, 2 × 62-Cell batteries; 2 × Propeller
- Speed: 14 kn (26 km/h; 16 mph) surfaced; 9.5 kn (17.6 km/h; 10.9 mph) submerged
- Range: 2,200 nmi (4,100 km; 2,500 mi) at 8 kn (15 km/h; 9.2 mph) on surface
- Test depth: 200 ft (61 m)
- Complement: 1 officer; 23 enlisted
- Armament: 4 × 18-inch (450 mm) torpedo tubes, 2 bow and 2 stern, 8 torpedoes.

USS Thrasher/G-4 (SS-26), also known as "Submarine No. 26", was a G-class submarine of the United States Navy (USN). Thrasher was the first ship of the USN to be named for the thresher shark, a shark with a long dorsal tail fin, though she was renamed G-4 prior to being launched.

While the four G-boats were nominally all of a class, they differed enough in significant details that they are sometimes considered to be four unique boats, each in a class by herself.

== Design ==
Thrasher was an attempt to introduce competition to the United States Navy submarine acquisition process. Italian naval architect Cesare Laurenti had been campaigning for permission to build a submarine for the Navy and he was granted a contract for one submarine in the Fiscal Year 1909 building program. The contract was approved with the proviso that the boat be built in the United States.

Thrasher was built with a radically different hull design. She had a full double hull, with an inner elliptically shaped pressure hull wrapped by a flattened circle shaped outer hull. Electric Boat had built all of their designs up to that point with a circular single hull. The hull design was not entirely successful, as she suffered from stability problems throughout her service. She very nearly capsized during her launch from the building ways. This boat also was the first USN submarine, by date of full commission status, with stern torpedo tubes. Thrasher had retractable bow and stern diving planes and two rudders, one ventral and one dorsal both at the stern.

== Construction ==
Thrasher's keel was laid down on 9 July 1910, by William Cramp & Sons, in Philadelphia, Pennsylvania. She was renamed G-4 on 17 November 1911. G-4 was launched on 15 August 1912, and sponsored by Ms. Grace Anna Taussig. She was commissioned in the Philadelphia Navy Yard, on 22 January 1914.

== Service history ==
After fitting out, G-4 proceeded to the New York Navy Yard, on 25 April 1914, for service with Division Three, Submarine Flotilla, Atlantic Fleet. Based on plans purchased from Italian designer Cesare Laurenti, G-4 was an even keel boat, meaning the round pressure hull was flat on the bottom. When surrounded by a streamlined outer hull, the boat was theoretically more stable than the earlier Holland-type boats. The different equipment and operating procedures meant G-4 spent the next five months conducting trial runs and diving tests, many of which failed owing to engine machinery breakdown. Still, almost all of her preliminary trials were completed by the end of August, and the boat was conditionally accepted by the Navy on 21 September.

At the end of October 1914, the boat shifted to New London, Connecticut, and from there she sailed on to Newport, Rhode Island, in mid-November. Moving back to New York, on 22 November, G-4 received post-shakedown repairs to her engines, which suffered from sea water damage owing to leaky exhaust lines and salt contamination of the oil system. After failing several engine trials that winter, the boat proceeded south to her builder's yard, in Philadelphia, on 9 March 1915. Following two months of repairs, G-4 departed Philadelphia, on 12 May, and sailed to New York, for a Naval Review before President Woodrow Wilson. G-4 then conducted maneuvers with the submarine flotilla off Newport, in late May, and again in October, in addition to local training operations out of New York, and the submarine base, in New London.

On 14 January 1916, G-4 commenced a planned three-month overhaul at the New York Naval Shipyard. Workers installed a gyrocompass and repaired equipment in preparation for final acceptance trials on 7 March. Although successfully put through her paces, the boat returned to the yard for further alterations, including the installation of new diving rudders. Trouble with the Sperry gyrocompass rudder control mechanism, as well as continued modifications to engines and other machinery, kept the boat in the New York Navy Yard through the end of the year. Finally tested at sea in February 1917, the gyro stabilizer and diving rudders then failed in heavy weather. After G-4 returned to the yard, the broken rudders were repaired and the stabilizer mechanism removed by 10 March.

Sailing to New London, on 24 April, G-4 was attached to Division Three, Submarine Flotilla. For the next year, she combined experimental work with new sound detection devices with training new student crews in submarine operations and torpedo firing, a period of time punctuated by her joining the submarine tender Fulton for harbor net defense experiments. Later in the month, G-4 carried out sound experiments, with Wacondah and Thetis, in the Thames River and Long Island Sound. In late July, she conducted battle exercises and submerged attack drills against submarine chaser SC-6. On 22 October, Thetis experimented with sound and magnetic detectors while G-4 lay on the bottom of Long Island Sound. Over the winter, she conducted numerous sound experiments with the newly established Submarine School, in the area of Block Island Sound and Long Island Sound.

In March 1918, G-4 shifted from New London to Newport, where she conducted magnetic detector experiments with Owera. The submarine also conducted practice approaches and torpedo instruction for officer and enlisted submarine students. On 21 May, G-4 commenced test firing the new Mark VII torpedo for installation in O and N-class submarines, evolutions that lasted through mid-July. The boat then returned to New London for a yard period, undergoing motor and electrical repairs through October. Although G-4 resumed training and instruction duties on 4 November, the boat was slated for inactivation on 24 February 1919.

G-4 continued her training and experimental duties until 1 March, when she was placed in ordinary for stripping and inactivation.

== Fate ==
She decommissioned on 5 September, was designated as a target for depth charge and ordnance tests on 6 December, and was sold for scrapping to Connecticut Iron & Metal Company, of New London, on 15 April 1920. She was struck from the Naval Vessel Register on 13 August 1921.

== Bibliography ==
- Goode, George Brown (1887). The Fisheries and Fishery Industries of the United States. Washington, DC: Washington, Government Printing Office. p. 672.
- "Table 21 - Ships on Navy List June 30, 1919". Congressional Serial Set. U.S. Government Printing Office: 764. 1921.
- Gary, Priolo. "Thrasher / G-4 (SS-26)". Navsource.net.
- Hedman, Ric; Johnston, David (8 May 2025). "Submarine Specifications".
- Hedman, Ric; Johnston, David (22 March 2025a). "G-4".
- Hedman, Ric; Johnston, David (8 May 2025b). "G-class".
- Friedman, Norman (1995). U.S. Submarines Through 1945: An Illustrated Design History. Annapolis, Maryland: Naval Institute Press. ISBN 1-55750-263-3.
- "G-4". Dictionary of American Naval Fighting Ships. Navy Department, Naval History and Heritage Command. 26 June 2015. This article incorporates text from this source, which is in the public domain.
