= USS G-3 =

G-class submarine of the United States

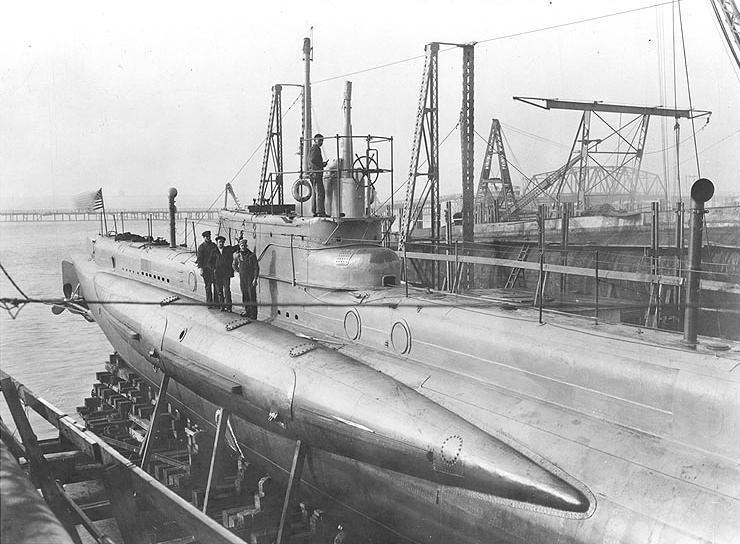
- USS G-3, ex-Turbot, starboard side looking aft, at the Lake Torpedo Boat Company shipyard, Bridgeport, Connecticut, 9 December 1915

History

United States
- Name: Turbot
- Namesake: The turbot
- Builder: Lake Torpedo Boat Company, Bridgeport, Connecticut
- Cost: $529,832.47 (hull and machinery)
- Laid down: 30 March 1911
- Launched: 27 December 1913
- Commissioned: 22 March 1915
- Decommissioned: 5 May 1921
- Renamed: G-3 (Submarine No.31), 17 November 1911
- Stricken: 19 April 1922
- Identification: Hull symbol: SS-31 (17 July 1920); Call sign: NYA
- Fate: Sold for scrapping, 19 April 1922

General characteristics
- Class & type: G-class submarine
- Displacement: 393 long tons (399 t) surfaced; 460 long tons (470 t) submerged
- Length: 161 ft (49 m)
- Beam: 13 ft 1 in (3.99 m)
- Draft: 12 ft 10 in (3.91 m)
- Installed power: 1,200 bhp (890 kW) (gasoline); 600 hp (450 kW) (electric)
- Propulsion: 2 × Busch Sulzer Brothers Diesel Engine Company diesel engines; 2 × Diehl Manufacturing Company electric motors, 2 × 60-Cell batteries; 2 × Propeller
- Speed: 14 kn (26 km/h; 16 mph) surfaced; 9.5 kn (17.6 km/h; 10.9 mph) submerged
- Range: 3,500 nmi (6,500 km; 4,000 mi) at 11 kn (20 km/h; 13 mph) on surface
- Test depth: 200 ft (61 m)
- Complement: 2 officer; 23 enlisted
- Armament: 6 × 18 inch (450 mm) torpedo tubes, (2 internal in the bow, 2 external in bow, 2 external stern, 10 torpedoes

USS Turbot/G-3 (SS-31), also known as "Submarine No. 31", was a G-class submarine of the United States Navy (USN). She was the first ship of the Navy to be named for the turbot, a large, brown and white flatfish, valued as a food, though she was renamed G-3 prior to launching.

While the four G-boats were nominally all of a class, they differed enough in significant details that they are sometimes considered to be four unique boats, each in a class by herself. Unlike the other three boats of the G-class, Turbot had diesel engines.

== Construction ==
Turbot's keel was laid down on 30 March 1911, by the Lake Torpedo Boat Company, Bridgeport, Connecticut. She was renamed G-3, on 17 November 1911. G-3 was transferred to the New York Navy Yard for completion, on 17 November 1913, following the cancellation of the Lake contract. She was launched on 27 December 1913, and commissioned on 22 March 1915.

== Service history ==
After fitting out, G-3 proceeded to Bridgeport, on 1 July 1915, to have sponsons fitted to the boat to increase stability. During submerged test runs off Port Jefferson, New York, in Long Island Sound, two weeks later, her crew discovered several leaks and the submersible docked at the Lake Company's marine railway for repairs and alterations. These modifications, which included work on the main engine oiling system, as well as sponson installation, lasted until 8 January 1916. On that date, she sailed back to the New York Navy Yard, to be inclined and undergo a deep submergence test. The latter took place off Eaton's Point, Long Island, on 8 February, with Simon Lake, owner of the Lake Torpedo Boat Company, embarked. The boat successfully completed a test dive to 198 ft (60 m) and was preliminarily accepted by the Navy that same day.

On 11 February, G-3 proceeded to New London, Connecticut, for initial shakedown operations. Aside from a brief period alongside submarine tender Tonopah, ex-monitor Nevada, to repair damaged screws in March, she spent the next five months conducting trial runs, dive tests and training operations out of New London. Following another yard period at Bridgeport, in mid-July, to replace defective lube pumps, the boat moved to New York, on 30 August, for final acceptance trials. Unfortunately, the breakdown of G-3's port engine disrupted her standardization trials in late September, prompting her move into the Navy Yard for repairs on 3 October. Difficulties in working in tight engine room spaces necessitated removing the port engine for repair and the boat remained immobile through the following spring. She finally put to sea on 1 June 1917, and returned to New London that same day.

Assigned to Division Two, (Training and Experimental Division), Submarine Flotilla, Atlantic Fleet, G-3 combined the training of new student crews in submarine operations and torpedo firing with experimental work as needed. The latter included harbor net defense deployment drills with tender Fulton, in June, and stationary dives with a submarine rescue bell in the Thames River in September. In late October, G-3 carried out instructional sound work with Parthenia, a task resumed in early 1918, in company with a succession of submarine chasers and patrol boats.

On 26 April 1918, she ran aground on Eel Grass Shoal near Fishers Island, New York. Refloated and returned to service. In May 1918, G-3 participated in submarine division maneuvers in Great Salt Pond Bay, including several two to five-day cruises at sea. In early June, following warnings of German U-boats off the East Coast, G-3 conducted a number of periscope and listening patrols in the region. These operations came to a sudden end on 13 June, when engine and battery trouble forced the boat to sail to New York for spare parts. Returning to New London, on 18 June, G-3 underwent an availability at the Thames Shipyard, through mid-July.

Resuming school duties on 17 July, G-3 spent the next three months conducting torpedo instruction, listening, and radio training for officer and enlisted submarine students. Following an engineering performance cruise to Boston, Massachusetts, in September, the boat conducted training operations through October. On 10 November, G-3 began preparations for an overhaul at the Submarine Base, New London, which lasted through April 1920. Although she returned to her familiar training and instruction duties in May, the boat was tapped for inactivation on 6 December.

== Fate ==
G-3 was decommissioned at New London, on 5 May 1921, and towed to the Philadelphia Navy Yard, on 17 August. Having been stripped of machinery and fittings, the hulk was sold for scrap to Joseph G. Hitner, on 19 April 1922, and struck from the Naval Vessel Register that same day.

== Bibliography ==
- "Table 21 - Ships on Navy List June 30, 1919". Congressional Serial Set. U.S. Government Printing Office: 764. 1921.
- Gary, Priolo. "Turbot / G-3 (SS-31)". Navsource.net.
- "G-3". Dictionary of American Naval Fighting Ships. Navy Department, Naval History and Heritage Command. 2 February 2004. This article incorporates text from this source, which is in the public domain.
- Hedman, Ric; Johnston, David (8 May 2025). "Submarine Specifications".
- Hedman, Ric; Johnston, David (8 May 2025b). "G-class".
- "Records of the T. A. Scott co". mysticseaport.org. Archived from the original on 16 April 2021.
