= SC-6 =

SC-6 or variant may refer to:

- South Carolina's 6th congressional district
- SC6 spodumene concentrate 6, a high-purity refined ore of lithium for battery manufacture
- SC 6, an abbreviation for South Carolina Highway 6
- Strathcarron SC-6, a British sports car; see Strathcarron Sports Cars
- USS SC-6, a United States Navy submarine chaser commissioned in 1918 and sold in 1921
- SC06, a FIPS 10-4 region code, see List of FIPS region codes (S–U)
- SC-06, a subdivision code for the Seychelles, see ISO 3166-2:SC
- SC6, the former branding of the 6:00 p.m. ET edition of ESPN's SportsCenter hosted by Jemele Hill and Michael Smith
- Soulcalibur VI, a fighting game published by Bandai Namco Entertainment
