= S-boat =

S-boat may refer to:

- Schnellboot, German torpedo boat
- United States S-class submarine
- British S-class submarine (1914), a Royal Navy class of submarines that served during World War I
- British S-class submarine (1931), a Royal Navy class of submarines that served during World War II
