= USS Grebe =

Minesweeper of the United States Navy

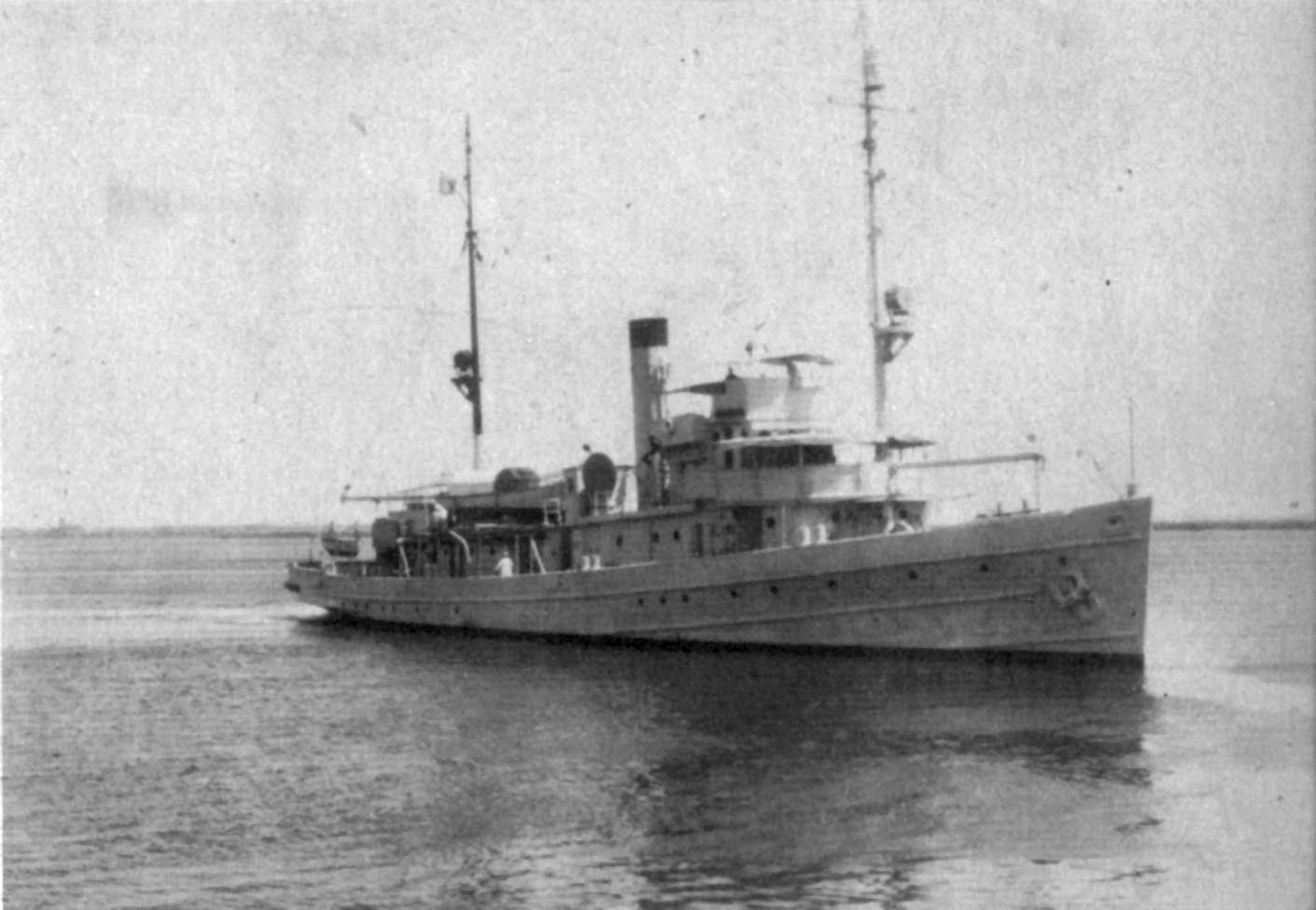

History

United States
- Name: USS Grebe
- Builder: Staten Island Steam Boat Co., New York
- Laid down: 25 May 1918
- Launched: 17 December 1918
- Commissioned: 1 May 1919, as Minesweeper No.43
- Reclassified: AM-43, 17 July 1920; AT-134, 1 June 1942
- Stricken: 28 July 1943
- Honours and awards: 1 battle star (World War II)
- Fate: Grounded at Vuanta Vatoa, Fiji, 6 December 1942; Wrecked by hurricane, 1–2 January 1943

General characteristics
- Class & type: Lapwing-class minesweeper
- Displacement: 950 long tons (965 t)
- Length: 187 ft 10 in (57.25 m)
- Beam: 35 ft 6 in (10.82 m)
- Draft: 8 ft 10 in (2.69 m)
- Propulsion: Triple expansion reciprocating steam engine; 2 Babcock & Wilcox boilers; 1 shaft
- Speed: 14 knots (26 km/h; 16 mph)
- Complement: 78
- Armament: 2 × 3 in (76 mm) guns

USS Grebe (AM-43) was a Lapwing-class minesweeper in the United States Navy.

Grebe was built by the Staten Island Steam Boat Co., was launched 17 December 1918; it was sponsored by Miss Emma Youmans and commissioned at the Brooklyn Navy Yard 1 May 1919. It served in many capacities until it was destroyed by a hurricane in 1943.

== Post-World War I mine clearance ==
From 9 July 1919 until 1 October, Grebe, based at Kirkwall, Orkney, was part of a minesweeper flotilla clearing the North Sea of mines laid by the Allies during World War I. She returned to Portsmouth, New Hampshire, 28 November 1919 via Devonport, Brest, Lisbon, the Azores, Bermuda, and New York. After extensive repairs, Grebe moved to the Boston Navy Yard 4 November 1920; from there she sailed the coast from Maine to New Jersey calibrating radio compass stations and doing miscellaneous towing and rescue work. On 29 April 1921 she rescued 139 passengers from the Portuguese steamer SS Mormugao, which had run aground off the Massachusetts coast.

== North Atlantic operations ==
Grebe's next duty took her to Newport, Rhode Island, on 2 June; she depth-charged the target submarine G-1 (SS-19½) off Taylor's Point, sinking her 23 June in 16 fathoms (29 m; 96 ft) of water. After participating in salvage operations, Grebe returned to Boston, Massachusetts, on 22 July to resume radio compass station calibration and other duties. From there she made a round trip to Norfolk, Virginia, Guantanamo Bay, Cuba, and the Panama Canal Zone which occupied her from 1 December 1921 until 18 March 1922, when she returned to Portsmouth. There she decommissioned 12 May 1922.

Grebe was recommissioned on 15 November 1922, Chief Boatswain Albert C. Fraenzel commanding. On 16 December she sailed for St. Thomas, capital of the Virgin Islands, where she served as station ship until 1931. Grebe made an average of a trip a week between St. Thomas, St. Croix, and San Juan carrying stores and passengers, both military and civilian; she also towed coal barges and dredges to San Juan, Fort de France, Martinique, and other Caribbean ports. While at St. Thomas, Grebe was invaluable in assisting disabled ships, mainly those grounded on coral reefs, and in searches for missing ships. This work was interrupted by a yearly five-week repair period at Charleston, South Carolina.

== Hurricane rescue work ==
Grebe's finest moment came in 1930 after hurricane San Zenón laid waste large parts of the Dominican Republic and killed thousands on September 3rd. Carrying trained medical men and emergency supplies from Puerto Rico, Grebe was the first ship to reach devastated Santo Domingo. She remained there for two weeks, helping unload other ships and clear debris.

17 March 1931 Grebe brought Dr. Paul M. Pearson, Governor-appointee, and his staff from San Juan to St. Thomas; nucleus of the Virgin Island's first civilian government.

== Towing the USS Constitution ==
Grebe then returned to Boston, Massachusetts. There on 12 July 1931 she took in tow historic sailing frigate USS Constitution. A long campaign had resulted in restoration of the famed ship to its original condition, and Grebe was to spend the next three years as her tender and towing ship as they visited every major American port, East and West Coast. Millions of Americans thrilled to their heritage touring "Old Ironsides" in New York City, Norfolk, Key West, Galveston, Guantanamo, Los Angeles, Seattle, Bellingham, Portland, and the Panama Canal Zone.

== Transfer to the Pacific Ocean ==
On 12 May 1934 Grebe relinquished her duties with Constitution, entering the Philadelphia Navy Yard for overhaul. After a brief tour of duty at Norfolk, Virginia, 21 August to 14 September, she sailed for Guantanamo Bay, Cuba, towed for fleet gunnery practice until 12 October, then sailed to San Pedro, California, arriving 19 November. Operating there until mid-1940; she performed a variety of tasks, including towing for target practice, participating in fleet problems, minesweeping exercises, training squadron details, and harbor service. Her tour there was interrupted by two voyages, the first to Pearl Harbor 6–31 May 1935 for fleet problems and the second to Guantanamo Bay, Cuba, and Norfolk, Virginia, 26 December to 7 May 1939 for gunnery exercises.

== Pearl Harbor assignment ==
Sailing from San Pedro, California, 3 June 1940, Grebe arrived in Pearl Harbor on 17 June to tow for gunnery and bombing practice, and participate in minesweeping training. Two trips back to the mainland, 1 August to 9 September and 27 September to 13 October 1941, in company with Bobolink (AM-20) on passenger and stores runs interrupted her Hawaiian duty.

== Under attack at Pearl Harbor ==
Grebe was in yard availability at Pearl Harbor on 7 December 1941. Her 3-inch guns had been dismantled for the overhaul so she could fight only with rifles and pistols. She was credited with shooting down one of three unidentified planes flying low over the Navy Yard. On 24 January Grebe departed for Palmyra Island with fuel oil barge YO-43 in tow where she arrived five days later. She returned to Honolulu on 5 February and continued from there until autumn. Her classification was changed to Fleet Tug AT-134 on 1 June 1941.

On 30 September Grebe joined a convoy for Johnston Island and returned on 9 October. On 9 November 1942 Grebe was underway again with lighter YC-737 and YB-9 in tow and accompanying YO-44, for Canton Island. Calling there on 25 November she proceeded to Pago Pago, Samoa arriving on 28 November.

== Run aground and broken up by a hurricane ==
On 6 December 1942, Grebe was grounded while attempting to float SS Thomas A. Edison at Vuata Vatoa, Fiji Islands. Salvage operations were broken up by a hurricane that destroyed both ships on 1–2 January 1943. Her name was struck from the Navy List 28 July 1943.

== Awards ==
Grebe earned one battle star for World War II service.
