= British S-class submarine (1914) =

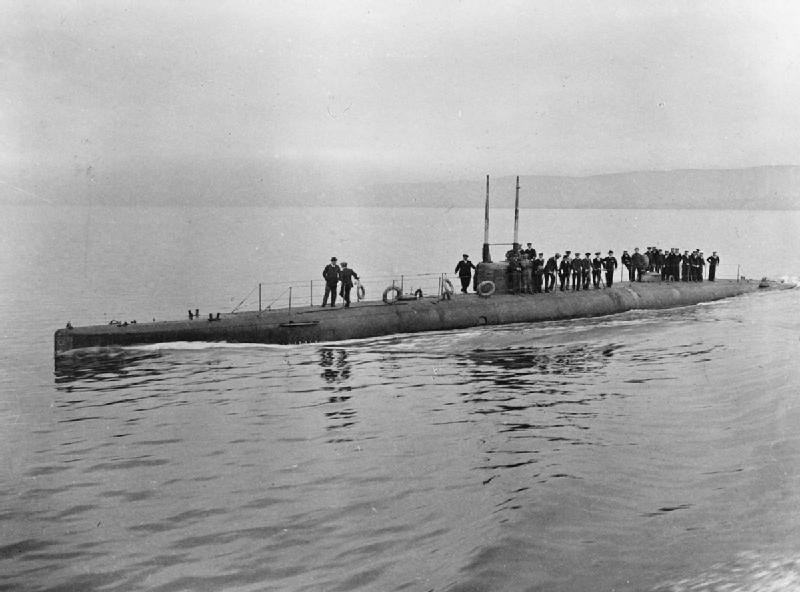
- S1, probably during trials in 1914

Class overview
- Builders: Scotts, Greenock, Scotland
- Operators: Royal Navy; Regia Marina
- Built: 1912–1915
- Completed: 3

General characteristics
- Type: Submarine
- Displacement: 265 tons surfaced; 324 tons submerged
- Length: 45.1 metres (148 ft 1.5 in)
- Beam: 4.4 metres (14 ft 5 in)
- Draught: 3.2 metres (10 ft 4.5 in)
- Propulsion: 2 x diesel engines, 650 bhp (480 kW); 2 x electric motors, 400 bhp (300 kW)
- Speed: 13 knots (24 km/h; 15 mph) surfaced; 8.5 knots (15.7 km/h; 9.8 mph) submerged
- Range: 1,600 nmi (3,000 km; 1,800 mi) at 8.5 kn surfaced
- Complement: 18
- Armament: 2 × 18-inch (450 mm) torpedo tubes; 4 torpedoes

The S class was a class of three submarines, built by Scotts in Greenock, Scotland for the Royal Navy, and launched in 1914–1915. The boats were an experimental design for the Royal Navy, based on an Italian design by Cesare Laurenti and the FIAT-San Giorgio works. The S class was the first British submarine to be built in Scotland, and the first to feature a double hull. The boats were not considered a success, and were not popular with Royal Navy officers. S1 and S2 saw limited service in the North Sea during the start of the First World War, before all three boats of the class were transferred to the Italian Regia Marina upon its entry to the war in 1915. In Italian service, S1 and S2 were active in the Adriatic Sea, and S3 was part of the Submarine School. All three were stricken in 1919 after the war, and scrapped.

== Background ==
Since the introduction of submarines into the fleet of the British Royal Navy in 1901 with the Holland class, all British submarines had been made by the Vickers shipbuilders. This was underpinned by an agreement between the British Admiralty and Vickers, granting the shipbuilders the exclusive right to build Admiralty-designed submarines in private shipyards. According to the naval historian Karl Lautenschläger, it took until around 1910 for submarines to become an effective part of naval warfare. It was at this time that Captain Roger Keyes was appointed as Inspecting Captain of Submarines for the Royal Navy, and wanted to improve the British submarine fleet, both in terms of quality and quantity. He believed that Vickers were unable to provide either, and having previously served as naval attaché in Italy and stayed abreast of Italian submarine developments, believed that foreign thoughts and designs could provide improvement. A foreign design would also circumvent the agreement with Vickers, allowing other British shipbuilders to get involved, which would increase construction capacity.

== Design and description ==
Keyes appointed a six-man Submarine Development Committee to study foreign designs and provide recommendations. Accordingly, in August 1911 four British officers travelled to La Spezia in north-west Italy to visit the FIAT-San Giorgio works, where they inspected two Medusa-class submarines, designed by Cesare Laurenti. They were impressed with the design, which featured a double hull not present on British designs, which was claimed to improve general seaworthiness. Four months later, in December, the Royal Navy placed an order with Scotts' of Greenock, Scotland for one submarine to a similar design, to be powered by two Scott-FIAT diesel engines.

Scotts, who had tendered £50,000 (equivalent to £6,400,000 in 2023) for the contract, held a license from FIAT-San Giorgio to build the submarines for the British market. Scotts modified a FIAT-San Giorgio design which had been ordered by the Imperial Russian Navy, which came to be known as the Argonauta class, itself an improved version of the Italian Medusa class. The British design was named the S class, using the first letter of the shipbuilders, Scotts, and the first boat was named S1. Two further submarines of the class were ordered in June 1913, S2 and S3.

The S class were coastal submarines, designed for the defence off the British coast, rather than operating in foreign waters. They had an overall length of 45.1 metres (148 ft 1.5 in), a beam of 4.4 metres (14 ft 5 in), and a mean draught of 3.2 metres (10 ft 4.5 in). Their surfaced displacement was 269 tonnes (265 long tons), and when submerged they displaced 329 tonnes (324 long tons). This made them a similar size to the existing British C-class submarine, though the design differed quite significantly. The S class had a partial double hull, with the ballast tanks located between an outer and inner hull. This provided greater buoyancy, but took longer to dive compared to single-hull submarines. The boats had a ship shape when surfaced, and adopted a 'ducktail' at the stern, typical of Laurenti's designs. Internally, the submarine featured ten watertight bulkheads, significantly more than the two present on the contemporaneous British-designed E-class submarine. The inner hull varied in height between 2.01 metres (6 ft 7 in) and 2.11 metres (6 ft 11 in), though a false floor was installed in the control room to make it 1.93 metres (6 ft 4 in).

The propulsion system for the S class consisted of two Scott-FIAT six-cylinder diesel engines producing 325 bhp (242 kW) each, for a total of 650 bhp (480 kW), and two electric motors which outputted a total of 400 bhp (300 kW). These engines could produce a speed of 13 knots (24 km/h; 15 mph) while surfaced, and 8.5 knots (15.7 km/h; 9.8 mph) when submerged. The boats had an operational range of 1,600 nautical miles (3,000 km; 1,800 mi) while traveling at 8.5 knots (15.7 km/h; 9.8 mph) when surfaced, and 75 nautical miles (139 km; 86 mi) while traveling at 5 knots (9.3 km/h; 5.8 mph) when submerged. The S class had a crew complement of 18.

The S class had identical armament to the C class; they had two 18-inch (450 mm) torpedo tubes located at the bow, and carried four torpedoes; two loaded in the tubes, and two stowed just above. In their encyclopedia of naval ships, Robert Gardiner and Randal Grey also list a 12-pounder deck gun, but in A. N. Harrison's history of British submarines written for the Ministry of Defence, he states that the S class did not have any guns fitted.

== Service history ==
Boats of the S class
Ship	Laid down	Launched	Completed	Fate
S1	23 August 1912	28 February 1914	August 1914	Transferred to the Royal Italian Navy, 25 October 1915
S2	20 October 1913	14 April 1915	May 1915	Transferred to the Royal Italian Navy, 25 October 1915
S3	4 March 1914	10 June 1915	September 1915	Transferred to the Royal Italian Navy, 25 October 1915

=== British service ===
All three boats were built by Scotts in their Greenock shipyard on the River Clyde. S1 was the first submarine to be built in Scotland, and was launched on 28 February 1914, just under give months before the outbreak of the First World War. Although the original order had been for just one vessel, so the Navy could compare its capabilities against the existing submarine fleet, two further vessels—S2 and S3—were ordered in June 1913, before the first had been completed. S1 underwent trials on the Clyde, before sailing to Portsmouth to join the Royal Navy fleet. During this journey, she had trouble with her housing hydroplanes, an issue that continued throughout the service of the S-class boats. S1 served in the 4th Submarine Flotilla based out of Dover, Kent, during 1914, before transferring to the 8th Submarine Flotilla out of Harwich, Essex. She was commanded by Lieutenant Commander Gilbert H. Kellett from November 1913 until September 1915, during which time she suffered engine problems. In June 1915, while patrolling north of Heligoland, off the German coast, both of S1's engines failed; first the port, and then the starboard. The submarine was stranded for three days before they sighted a German fishing trawler, Ost, which they commandeered and used to tow S1 some 500 kilometres (300 miles) back to the United Kingdom.

The S class was disliked by British submariners; Harrison suggests that this might have been due to a combination of the hydroplane issues and the slow dive time compared to other submarines in Royal Navy service, while it was also suggested that they were unsuited for service in the North Sea. Gardiner and Grey reject the latter claim, saying that "there is no apparent reason why boats with such a high reserve of buoyancy should be poor seaboats"; they instead suggest that the unpopularity of the S class was more likely due to "the general lack of familiarity with Italian practice and design". In any case, by mid-1915 the Royal Navy had more submarines than crew, and with the entry of Italy into the war that year, all three S-class boats were transferred to the Regia Marina (Royal Italian Navy). S2 had only just completed trials when she was transferred, while S3 had not yet completed hers.

=== Italian service ===
The specific dates the vessels were transferred from British to Italian control is unclear; various sources provide dates ranging from July 1915 through to November that year. Once in Italian service, S1 and S2 saw active duty in the Adriatic Sea, while S3 was part of the Submarine School. All three were scrapped after the war; S1 and S2 were stricken on 23 January 1919, and S3 followed on 1 May of the same year.
