= Argonaut (submarine) =

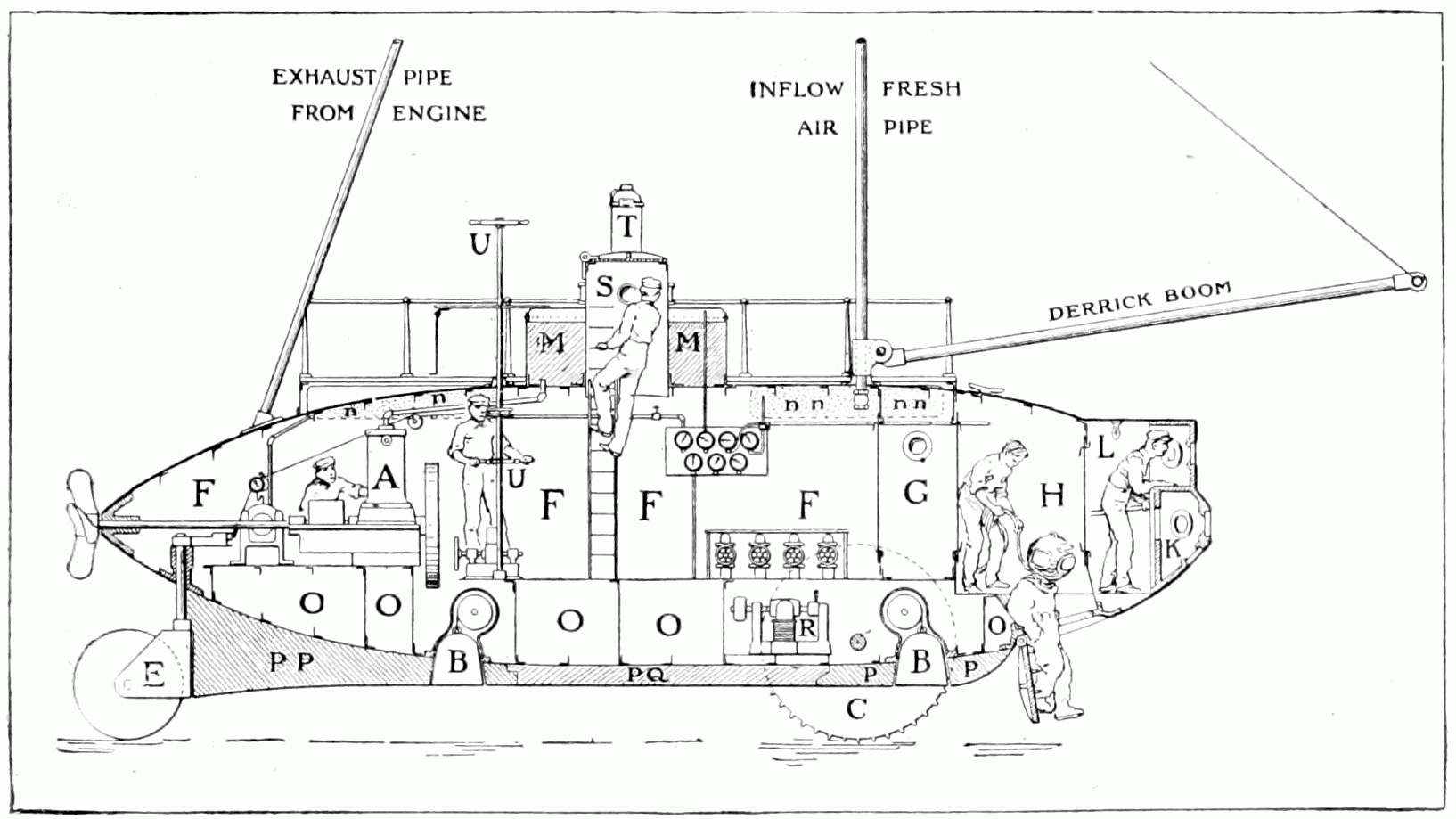
- Longitudinal section of Argonaut

Class overview
- Builders: Simon Lake, Baltimore, Maryland
- Preceded by: Argonaut Junior
- Completed: 2
- Retired: 2

History
- Name: Argonaut
- Launched: 1898

General characteristics for Argonaut No 1
- Type: Submarine
- Length: 36 ft (11.0 m)
- Propulsion: Gas engine and propeller

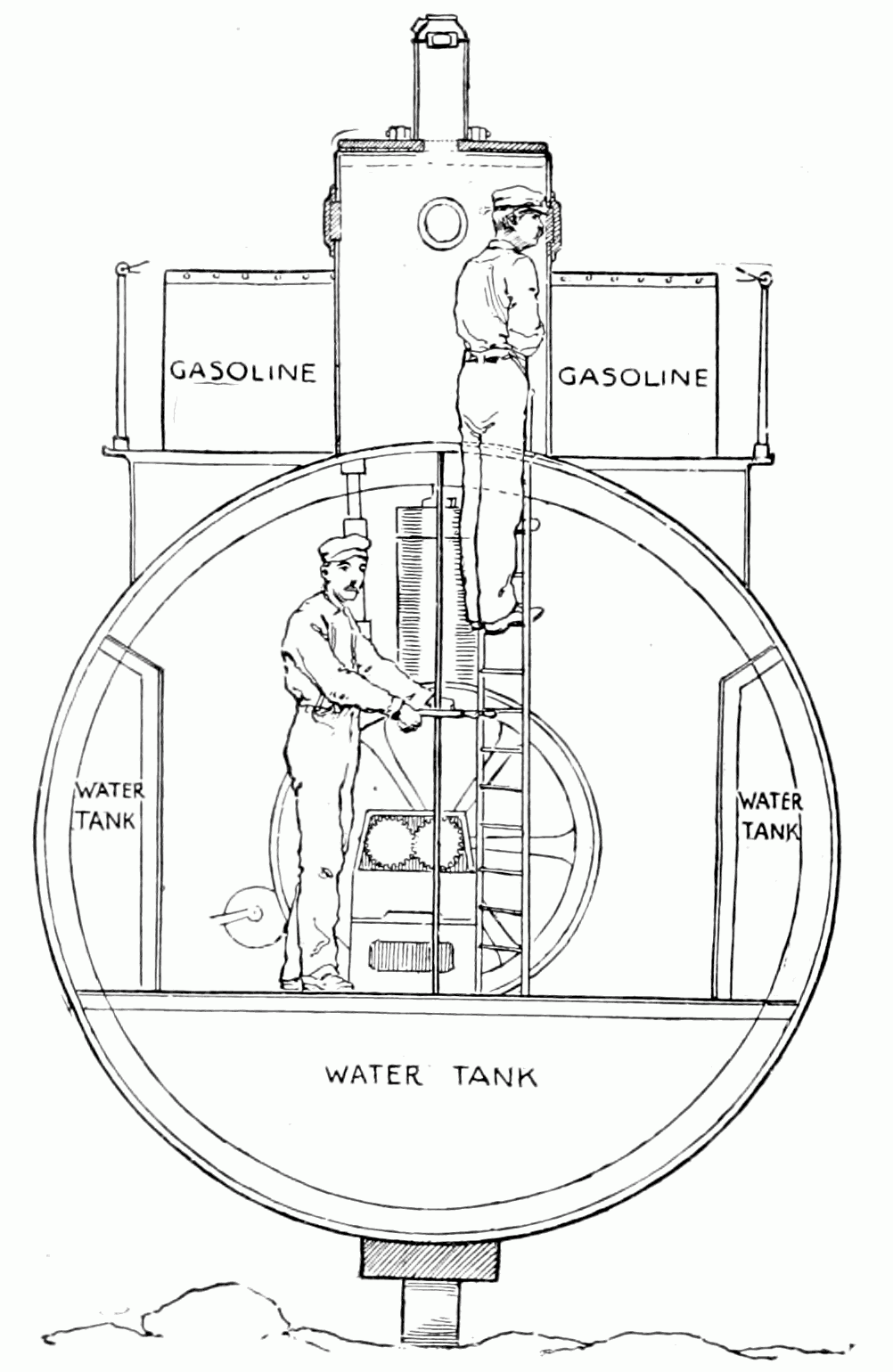
Cross section of Argonaut amidships

Argonaut was a class of submarines built by engineer Simon Lake. When used without clarification Argonaut generally refers to the second-built and larger submarine launched in 1900 at Baltimore. She was 36-foot (11 m) long, cigar shaped and built of steel. She had a White and Middleton gas engine and propeller, dynamo, searchlight, and pumps for air and water. Her main attribute like that of the older sibling and predecessor Argonaut Junior (1894); was a wet diving chamber that allowed a diver to leave and re-enter the submarine. Argonaut No 1, and Argonaut No 2 are used as the name of this vessel.

Argonaut No 1 was built in 1897 and is 36 feet (11 m) in length. In September 1898 it made an open-ocean passage from Norfolk, Virginia, to Sandy Hook, New Jersey, becoming the first submarine to operate successfully in the open sea.

Argonaut No 2 was a reconstruction of Argonaut No 1 finishing in 1900 with a length of 60 feet (18 m) and significantly different profile.
