= White and Middleton =

White and Middleton Gas Engine Company
- Industry: Internal combustion engine manufacture
- Founded: Late 19th century
- Founder: Charles White, Arthur R. Middleton
- Headquarters: Baltimore, Maryland, United States
- Products: Engines

The White and Middleton Gas Engine Company was a manufacturer of internal combustion engines in the late 19th and early 20th centuries headquartered in Baltimore, Maryland, in the United States.

== Company history ==
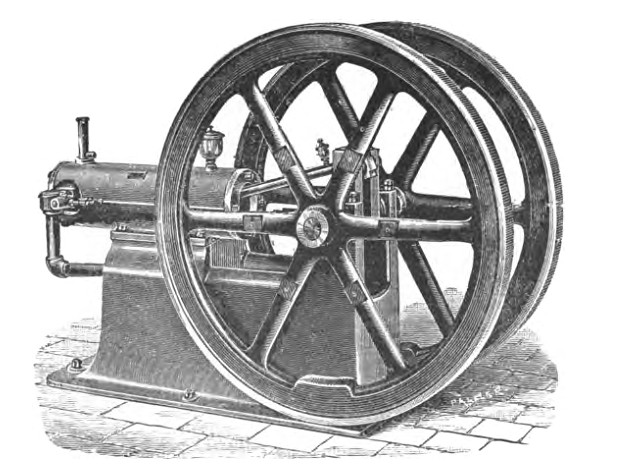
1898 illustration of a White and Middleton engine. Note the large twin flywheels that serve to smooth the power output of this single-stroke engine.

The company was founded and operated during most of its existence by Charles White and Arthur R. Middleton. The company exhibited in the Machinery Hall at the 1893 World's Fair in Chicago.

The engines the company manufactured could be powered either by natural gas or by gasoline. They were employed for such varied uses as powering riverboats, generating electricity for local power grids, grinding coffee for both industrial coffee processors and coffee shops, and driving submarines.

White and Middleton engines were used both in the original Victorian era Argonaut-class submarines of Simon Lake and in the Protector-class submarines built by the Lake Torpedo Boat Company of Bridgeport, Connecticut and sold to the German, Austro-Hungarian, and Russian Imperial Navies during the decade preceding World War I. Two later Lake submarine models, the G-1 and G-2 which were purchased by the United States Navy, also used White and Middleton engines. A White and Middleton engine powered the electrical generator for Vanderbilt's Biltmore Estate in Asheville, North Carolina.

The rising success of the company as the new century dawned permitted the opening of a distribution subsidiary in Chicago, Illinois. In 1912 Charles White purchased Arthur R. Middleton's interest in the company and the firm was dissolved by mutual agreement, with the engines continuing to be produced by The Charles White Gas Engine Company. The company was eventually sold to Richard Thomas. Later U.S. Naval records list the company headquarters as Springfield, Ohio.

== Products ==
In 1898 White and Middleton produced nine different sizes of engine. Some models were approved by Underwriters Laboratories.

An engine of the ordinary four-cycle type, for gas or gasoline, is made by the White & Middleton Company, Baltimore, in sizes from 4 to 50 B.H.P. In this motor the valve shaft is replaced by spur-gearing. Ignition is by a tube with a timing valve, the spindle of which is worked from the motor piston. Ports are also uncovered by the piston, through which part of the exhaust products escape; the remainder are discharged at the end of the stroke through a valve worked by a rod and levers from the crank shaft, through a slide and cam. The same rod actuates the spindle of the gas valve. Both exhaust and admission are thrown out of gear by the governor if the normal speed is exceeded. If the engine is driven with gasoline a small oil pump is substituted for the gas valve-rod, and is controlled on the "hit-and-miss " principle by the governor.

— A Text-book on Gas, Oil, and Air Engines, 1903

=== Performance data ===
Sample data on tests of 30 hp White and Middleton engines from the U.S. Bureau of Mines
| Brake horsepower | Indicated horsepower | Friction horsepower | Per cent. rated load | Mechanical efficiency | |
| Brake horsepower | Indicated horsepower | Friction horsepower | Per cent. rated load | $\dfrac{\mbox{b.hp.}}{\mbox{i.hp.}} \times 100$ | $\dfrac{\mbox{b.hp.}}{\mbox{b.hp.} + \mbox{avg. f.hp.}} \times 100$ |
|---|---|---|---|---|---|
| 11.8 | 18.5 | 6.7 | 39.0 | 64.0 | 64.0 |
| 8.0 | 16.0 | 7.1 | 26.7 | 50.0 | 54.4 |
| 5.9 | 11.7 | 5.8 | 19.7 | 50.4 | 46.8 |
| 2.9 | 10.1 | 7.2 | 9.7 | 28.7 | 30.2 |
| | | Avg. 6.7 | | | |
