= Osetr-class submarine =

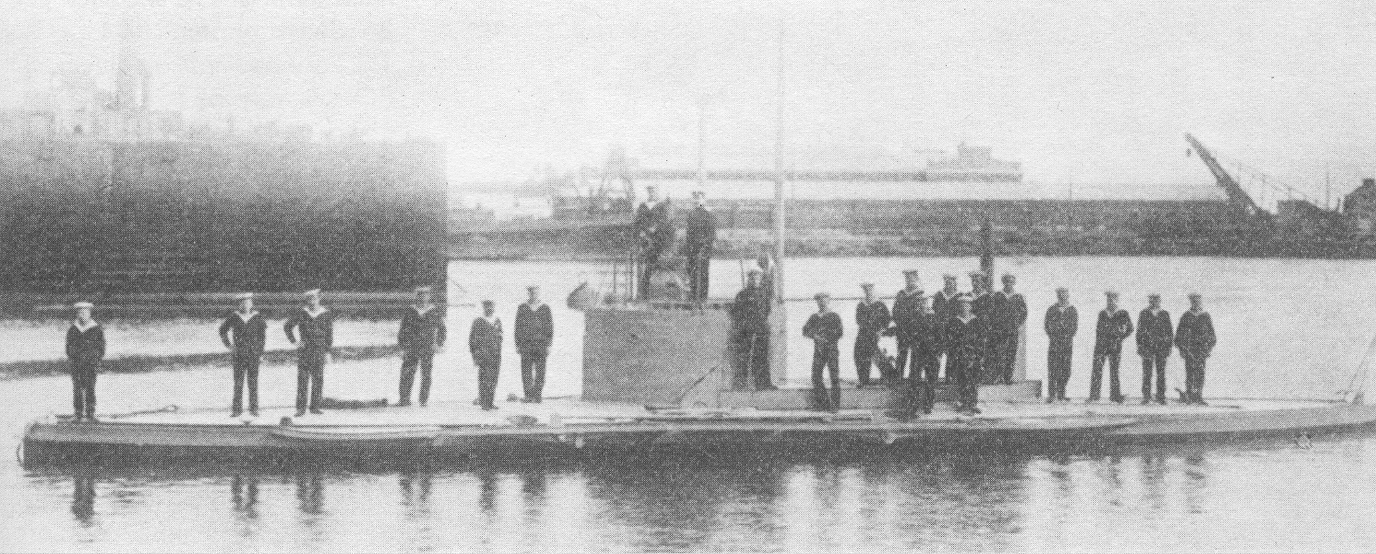
- Russian submarine Sig

Class overview
- Name: Osetr class
- Builders: Libau Arsenal, Latvia
- Operators: Imperial Russian Navy
- In commission: 1905–1913
- Completed: 6
- Retired: 6

General characteristics
- Type: Submarine
- Displacement: 153 tons surfaced; 187 tons submerged
- Length: 22 m (72 ft 2 in)
- Beam: 3.6 m (11 ft 10 in)
- Draught: 3.7 m (12 ft 2 in)
- Propulsion: 2 shafts: petrol / electric; 2 × 120 hp (89 kW) / 2 x 65 hp (48 kW)
- Speed: 8.5 knots (15.7 km/h; 9.8 mph) surfaced; 4.5 knots (8.3 km/h; 5.2 mph) submerged
- Complement: 12 (including 2 officers)
- Armament: 3 × 18-inch torpedo tubes (2 bow, 1 stern)

The Osetr class were a group of submarines built for the Imperial Russian Navy during the Russo–Japanese War. The boats were ordered in the 1904 emergency programme. The boats were designed by American engineer Simon Lake and had wheels fitted for moving around on the sea bed as well as wet/dry chambers for divers. Osetr was the former Protector sold by Lake to the Russians and re-assembled in Russia. The diving depth was around 30 metres (98 ft).

== Ships ==
All ships were built by the Lake company at the Libau Arsenal (Latvia) and were launched in 1904

Ship	Namesake	Service / Fate
Bychok - Бычок	Goby	Decommissioned 1913
Kefal - Кефаль	Mullet	Decommissioned 1913
Osetr - Осётр (ex Protector)	Sturgeon	Decommissioned 1913
Paltus - Палтус	Halibut	Decommissioned 1913
Plotva - Плотва	Roach	Decommissioned 1913
Sig - Сиг	Coregonus	Decommissioned 1913
