= HMS S1 (1914) =

Submarine of the British Royal Navy and later, the Italian Regia Marina

History

United Kingdom
- Name: HMS S1
- Builder: Scotts Shipbuilding and Engineering Company, Greenock
- Launched: 28 February 1914
- Decommissioned: Ceded to Italian Navy 25 October 1915
- Fate: Stricken 1919

General characteristics
- Displacement: 265 tons surfaced; 324 tons submerged
- Length: 45.1 m (148 ft 0 in)
- Beam: 4.4 m (14 ft 5 in)
- Draught: 3.2 m (10 ft 6 in)
- Propulsion: 2 shafts, Scott-FIAT 6-cyl Diesels, 2 Electric motors, 650 / 400 hp
- Speed: 13 knots (24 km/h) surfaced; 8.5 knots (15.7 km/h) submerged
- Range: 1,600 nautical miles (3,000 km) at 8.5 knots (15.7 km/h) surfaced
- Complement: 18
- Armament: 2 × 18-inch (450 mm) torpedo tubes – 4 torpedoes, 1 × 12-pdr gun

HMS S1 was a British S-class submarine built in 1914 based on an Italian design.

While on patrol in June 1915, the submarine's engines failed. The crew were able to capture the German fishing trawler Ost and used it to tow the submarine home.

The submarine was transferred to the Italian Royal Navy in October 1915 and stricken in 1919.

== Bibliography ==
- Colledge, J. J.; Warlow, Ben (2006) [1969]. Ships of the Royal Navy: The Complete Record of All Fighting Ships of the Royal Navy from the 15th Century to the Present (3rd Rev ed.). London: Chatham Publishing. ISBN 978-1-86176-281-8. OCLC 67375475.
- Gardiner, Robert & Gray, Randal, eds. (1985). Conway's All The World's Fighting Ships 1906–1921. London: Conway Maritime Press. ISBN 0-85177-245-5.
