= Argonaut Junior =

Submarine

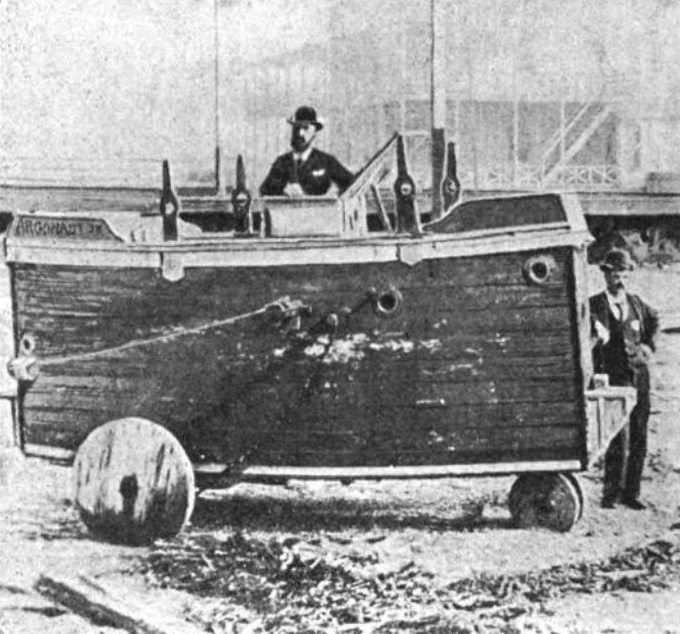
- Argonaut Junior (1894) was the first successful submarine built by engineer Simon Lake. She was triangular, made of wood (yellow pine), and had three wheels to keep her from getting stuck to the sea bottom.

History
- Name: Argonaut Junior
- Builder: Simon Lake
- Launched: 1894

General characteristics
- Type: Submarine
- Length: 14 ft (4.3 m)
- Beam: 4 ft (1.2 m)
- Draft: 5 ft (1.5 m)

Argonaut Junior was the first successful submarine built by the American engineer Simon Lake. Her main attribute, like that of the sub built by Lake in 1897, Argonaut, was an air lock. Her dimensions were length 14 ft (4.3 m), beam 4 ft (1.2 m), and a depth of 5 ft (1.5 m). Different sources incorrectly identify Argonaut No 1, and Argonaut No 2 as the name of this vessel. Argonaut No 1 was built in 1897 and is 36 feet (11 m) in length, Argonaut No 2 was a reconstruction of Argonaut No 1 finishing in 1900 with a length of 60 feet (18 m) and significantly different profile.

Argonaut Junior was built in 1894 as a prototype by Lake after he was denied a contract by the U.S. Navy. It was triangular, made of wood (yellow pine), and had three wheels to keep it from getting stuck to the sea bottom. She moved along the bottom of Sandy Hook Bay by one or two men cranking the axle of the two driving wheels. With sufficient air pressure in the cabin, a bottom door (air lock) could be opened and no water would come into the boat. Then by putting on a pair of rubber boots the operator could walk around on the sea bottom and push the boat along with him and pick up objects from the sea bottom.

A full-scale replica was built in 1994 by the Atlantic Highlands Lions Club and is on open-air display next to the Harbor Park in Atlantic Highlands, New Jersey.

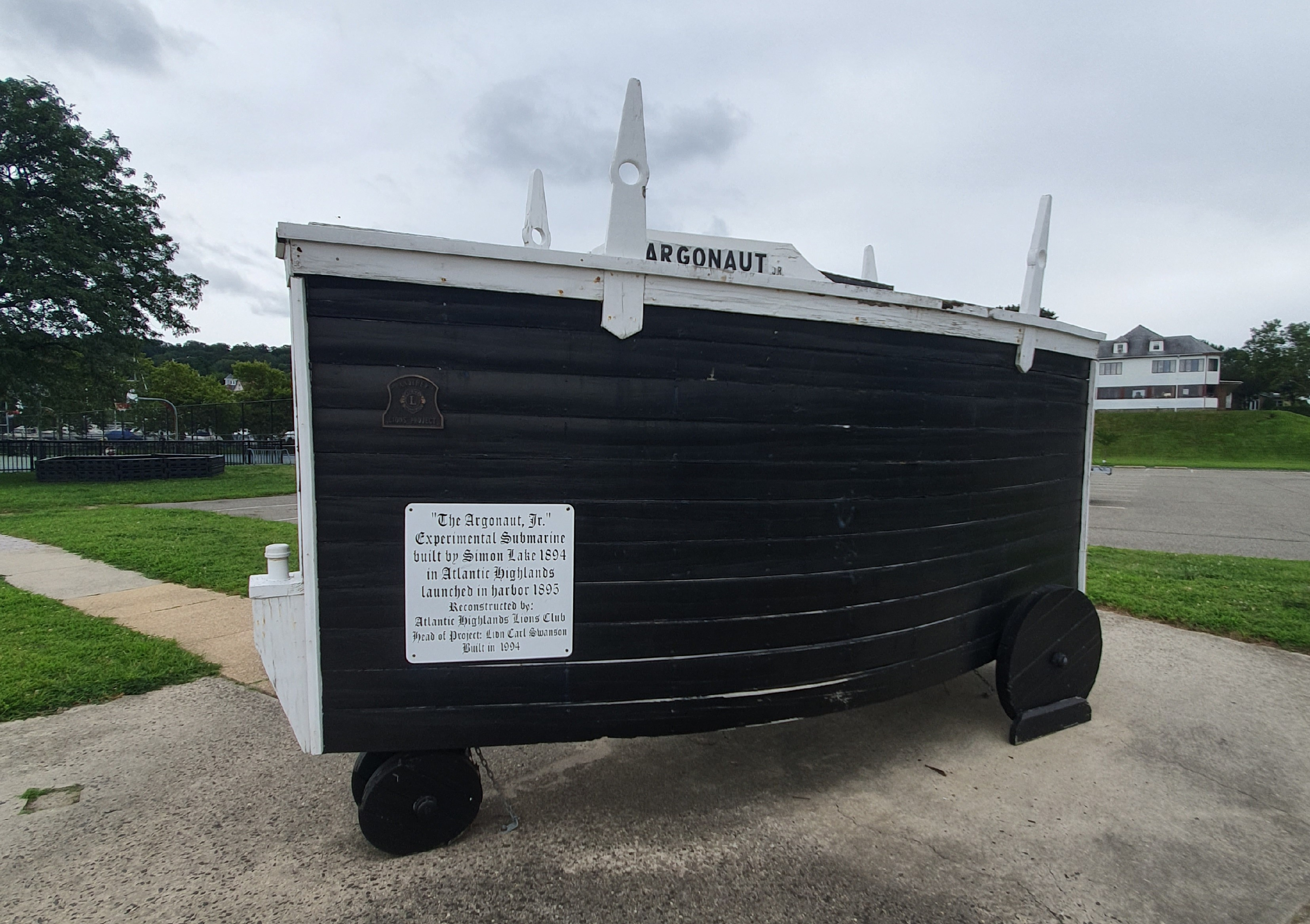
Argonaut Jr. submarine replica in Atlantic Highlands, New Jersey
