= USS G-1 =

G-class submarine of the United States

Coordinates: 41°30′53″N 71°21′15″W

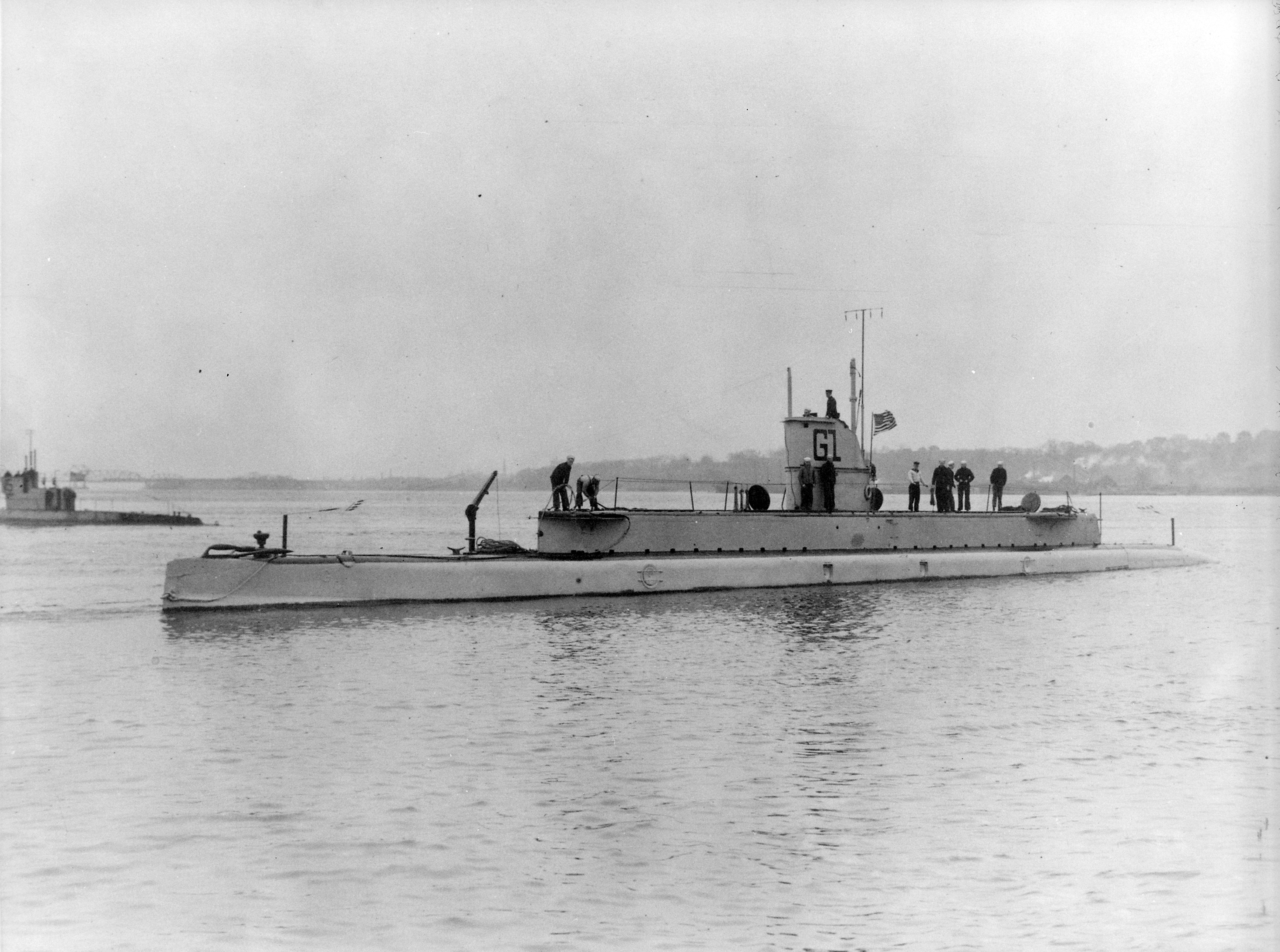
- USS G-1, ex-Seal, in 1912

History

United States
- Name: Seal
- Namesake: The seal
- Builder: Newport News Shipbuilding & Drydock Co., Newport News, Virginia
- Cost: $470,904.29 (hull and machinery)
- Laid down: 2 February 1909
- Launched: 8 February 1911
- Sponsored by: Miss Margaret V. Lake
- Commissioned: 28 October 1912
- Decommissioned: 6 March 1920
- Renamed: G-1 (Submarine No.19 1/2), 17 November 1911
- Stricken: 6 March 1920
- Identification: Hull symbol: SS-20 (17 July 1920); Call sign: NSH
- Fate: Sunk as target, 21 June 1921

General characteristics
- Class & type: G-class submarine
- Displacement: 400 long tons (410 t) surfaced; 516 long tons (524 t) submerged
- Length: 161 ft (49 m)
- Beam: 13 ft 1 in (3.99 m)
- Draft: 12 ft 6 in (3.81 m)
- Installed power: 1,200 bhp (890 kW) (gasoline); 520 hp (390 kW) (electric)
- Propulsion: 2 × White & Middleton gasoline engines; 2 × Diehl Manufacturing Company electric motors, 2 × 60-Cell batteries; 2 × Propeller
- Speed: 14 kn (26 km/h; 16 mph) surfaced; 10 kn (19 km/h; 12 mph) submerged
- Range: 3,500 nmi (6,500 km; 4,000 mi) at 11 kn (20 km/h; 13 mph) on surface
- Test depth: 200 ft (61 m)
- Complement: 1 officer; 23 enlisted
- Armament: 4 × 18-inch (450 mm) torpedo tubes (2 in trainable deck mounts, 2 internally in bow), 8 torpedoes

USS Seal/G-1 (SS-19½/20), also known as "Submarine No. 19 1/2", was the lead ship of her class of submarines of the United States Navy (USN). She was the first ship of the USN to be named for the seal, a sea mammal valued for its skin and oil, though she was renamed G-1 prior to commissioning.

While the four G-boats were nominally all of a class, they differed enough in significant details that they are sometimes considered to be four unique boats, each in a class by herself.

== Design ==
Seal was the first contract the Lake Torpedo Boat Company secured from the United States Government, but the contract's requirements were among the most severe ever required of a shipbuilder. The Company did not receive any payment on account during her construction and her required performances had never been approached by any other submarine in the world. G-1 eventually met those requirements and was commissioned into the Navy, albeit several years late. In addition to a pair of fixed torpedo tubes in the bow, G-1 carried two torpedo tubes in mounts inside her superstructure that could be trained in the same manner as a deck gun on a surface vessel while the boat was submerged, thus allowing a "broadside" shot of one or more torpedoes.

== Construction ==
Seal's keel was laid down on 2 February 1909, by the Newport News Shipbuilding & Drydock Company, in Newport News, Virginia, under a subcontract from the Lake Torpedo Boat Company. She was launched on 8 February 1911, sponsored by Miss Margaret V. Lake, daughter of Simon Lake, the submarine pioneer. She was renamed G-1 on 17 November 1911, and commissioned in the New York Navy Yard, on 28 October 1912.

== Service history ==
After fitting out in New York, G-1 proceeded to the Naval Torpedo Station, Rhode Island, arriving there on 30 January 1913. Attached to the Atlantic Submarine Flotilla, G-1 spent the next year and a half conducting dive training and torpedo firing exercises in Long Island Sound and Narragansett Bay. In preparation for her final acceptance trials in October 1913, the boat made a record dive of 256 ft (78 m) in Long Island Sound. Financial considerations led to G-1 being put in reserve at New York, on 15 June 1914.

G-1 was placed in full commission at New York, on 6 February 1915. In company with her sister ship G-2, tender Fulton, and tug Sonoma, G-1 sailed south on 25 March, into Chesapeake Bay, and down the seaboard for Norfolk, Virginia. Arriving there two days later, she conducted maneuvers in Hampton Roads, as part of the Third Division, Submarine Flotilla, Atlantic Fleet. On 2 April, while off Old Point Comfort, G-1 grazed the steam ship Ocean View, wrecking the submersible's wooden false bow.

After a short period at Norfolk, for repairs, the division cruised south to Charleston, South Carolina, mooring there on 17 April. Heavy seas encountered during this coastwise passage caused the two G-class submarines to roll heavily, spring oil leaks, and pop engine rivets. Following a three-week yard period in Charleston, the two boats, accompanied by Fulton and gunboat Castine, proceeded back to New York, on 6 May, arriving there three days later.

Upon arrival, retired Rear Admiral Yates Stirling Jr., senior aide on the staff of Commander, Submarine Flotilla, Atlantic Fleet, inspected the boat and concluded the G-boats were crude and inefficient in comparison to current designs. Deeming "their military value...negligible", he urged that a field of scientific or experimental use be found for them.

=== Training ship ===
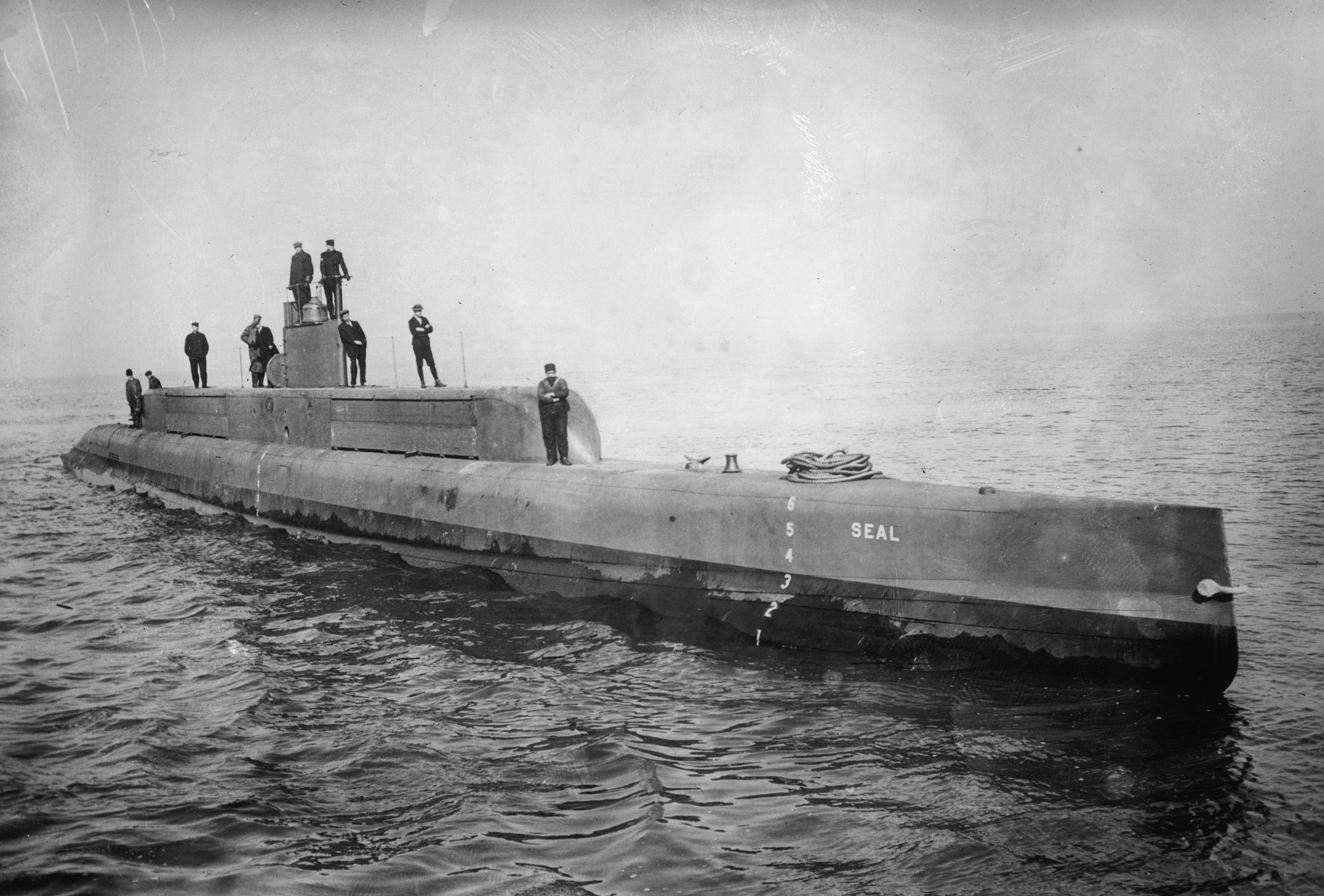
Seal afloat after launching, off the Newport News Shipbuilding and Dry Dock Company shipyard, Newport News, Virginia, 8 February 1911

G-1 departed New York, on 23 May 1915, and proceeded to Newport, Rhode Island, where she became a school ship on the torpedo range. She also carried out harbor defense and patrol battle problems in Narragansett Bay. Aside from minor repairs at New York, in June, this duty continued until 3 October, when she set course, along with submarine tender, ex-monitor, Ozark, for a training cruise to Chesapeake Bay. After making a few days of practice attack runs against the ex-monitor off Fisherman Island, the boat returned to Newport, on 12 October, for inspection and crew changes; a week later, she shifted to Naval Submarine Base New London, the new submarine base, at New London, Connecticut.

On 4 December 1915, while the crew of G-1 was charging batteries, a circulating pump broke down and severely overheated the port engine. That mishap, combined with a steering gear overhaul at New York, kept ship's force busy in the yard for the next thirteen months. While there, G-1 was assigned (SS-19½) as her official hull number on 12 June 1916. The assigning of half a hull number was an unprecedented move by the Navy, making G-1 unique amongst all ships in the Navy. Finally, after a few days of familiarization training, the crew sailed the boat to New London, on 23 January 1917.

Once there, G-1 began her new career as an experimental and instructional submersible. She acted as a schoolship for the newly established Submarine Base and Submarine School, at New London, training officers and men of the newly expanded submarine force. Concurrently, given the entry of the United States into World War I, G-1 tested submarine nets and detector devices for the Experiment Board. She served in a similar capacity at Nahant, Massachusetts, and Provincetown, Massachusetts, assisting the destroyer Aylwin and steam yacht Margaret in the development and use of sound detection devices and experiments with the "K tube", a communications device. With German U-boats reported off the coast in June 1918, the submarine spent two four-day periscope and listening patrols off Nantucket, Massachusetts, as a defense screen for shipping.

Following the end of the war, G-1 conducted daily operations with enlisted students in connection with the Listener and Hydrophone School at New London. In August 1919, after a failed inspection by the Board of Inspection and Survey, the boat was laid up at New London, in preparation for disposal. Towed to the Philadelphia Navy Yard, on 30 January 1920, she was stripped of useful material and decommissioned on 6 March. She was designated as a target for depth charge experiments under the cognizance of the Bureau of Ordnance on 9 June.

In 1920, G-1 was redesignated SS-20 even though that hull classification symbol and number had already been given to F-1, ex-Carp. F-1 had sunk in a collision with F-3 in 1917, so there was no overlap in time of service.

== Fate ==
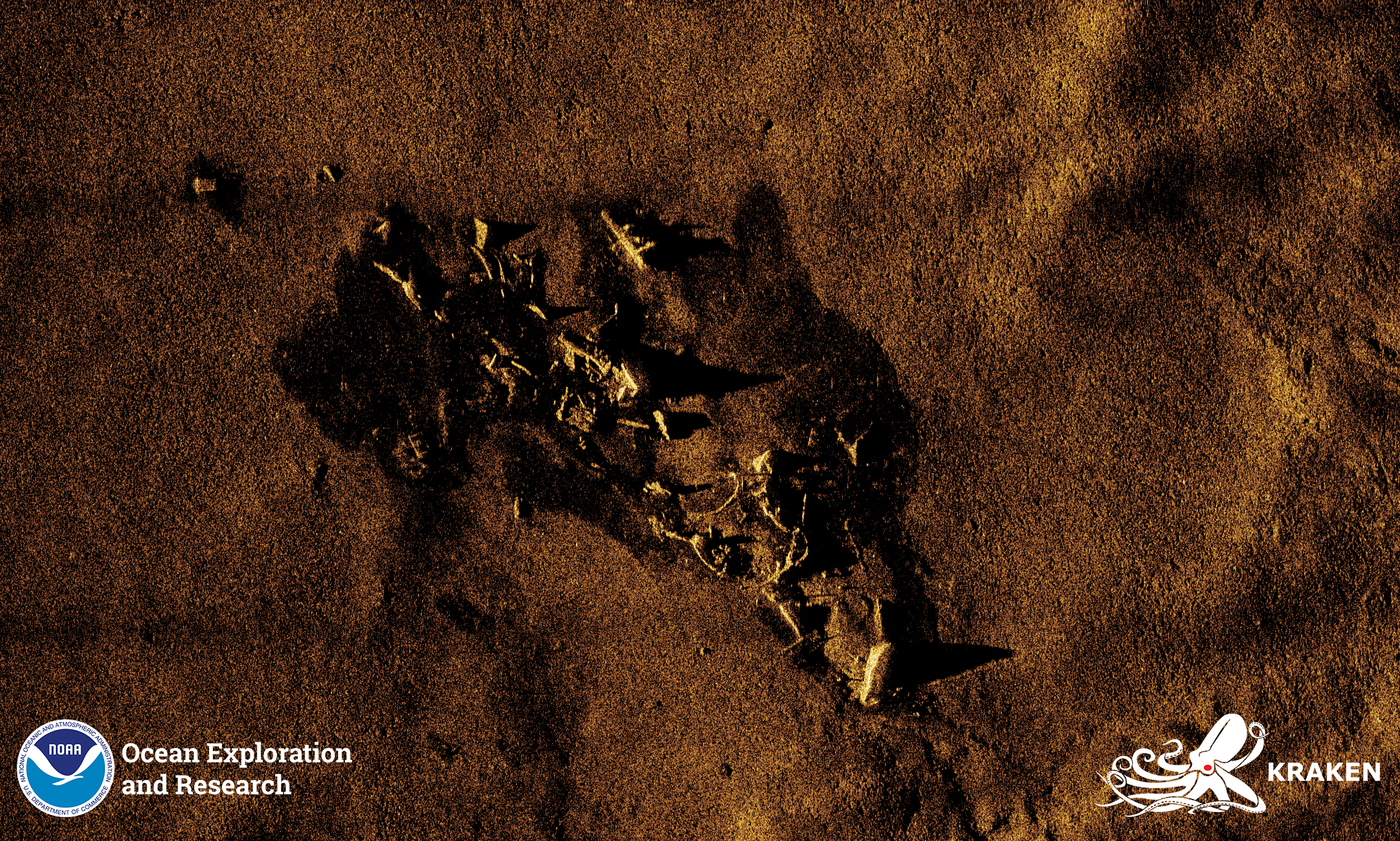
Synthetic aperture sonar imagery of the wreck of USS G-1.

The minesweeper Grebe towed G-1 back to Narragansett Bay, in May 1921. Grebe made eight experimental depth charge attacks on G-1 while the boat lay off Taylor's Point, on 21 June. Damaged and flooded by those explosions, the battered submarine settled to the bottom in 90 ft (27 m) of water. Several attempts to raise her failed and her wreck was officially abandoned. G-1 was struck from the Naval Vessel Register on 29 August 1921.

== Bibliography ==
- "Table 21 - Ships on Navy List June 30, 1919". Congressional Serial Set. U.S. Government Printing Office: 764. 1921.
- Gary, Priolo. "Seal / G-1 (SS-19½)". Navsource.net.
- "G-1". Dictionary of American Naval Fighting Ships. Navy Department, Naval History and Heritage Command. 9 July 2015. This article incorporates text from this source, which is in the public domain.
- Friedman, Norman (1995). U.S. Submarines Through 1945: An Illustrated Design History. Annapolis, Maryland: Naval Institute Press. ISBN 1-55750-263-3.
- Hedman, Ric; Johnston, David (8 May 2025). "G-class".
- Hedman, Ric; Johnston, David (13 March 2025a). "G-3".
