= Simon Lake =

American inventor (1866–1945)

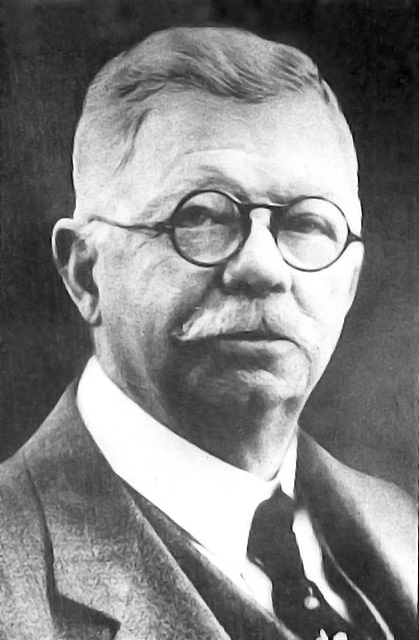
- Born: September 4, 1866; Pleasantville, New Jersey
- Died: June 23, 1945 (aged 78); Milford, Connecticut
- Spouse: Margaret Vogel (1890-1956)
- Children: Miriam Catherine Lake ( May 2nd, 1891-?); Thomas Alva Edison Lake ( Nov. 8th, 1892-1979); Margaret Vogel Lake (Jan. 24th, 1895-?)
- Parent: Christopher J. Lake
- Engineering career
- Projects: Submarines; Single screw steering gear automatic soldering machine for tin cans
- Significant advance: Naval design

Simon Lake (September 4, 1866 – June 23, 1945) was a Quaker American mechanical engineer and naval architect who obtained over two hundred patents for advances in naval design and competed with John Philip Holland to build the first submarines for the United States Navy.

== Biography ==
Born in Pleasantville, New Jersey on September 4, 1866. He studied at the Clinton Liberal Institute in Fort Plain, New York. Lake joined his father's foundry business after attending public schools in New Jersey and Pennsylvania. Lake had a strong interest in undersea travel.

He built his first submarine, Argonaut Junior, in 1894 in response to an 1893 request from the US Navy for a submarine torpedo boat. In 1898 he followed up with the 36-foot (11 m) Argonaut 1, which he sailed from Norfolk, Virginia for one thousand miles (1,600 km) to Sandy Hook, New Jersey (which is actually 250 miles (400 km) north of Norfolk), arriving in November 1898. As a result of lessons learned on that journey, he rebuilt it into the 60-foot (18 m) Argonaut 2.

Neither Argonaut nor Lake's following submarine, Protector, built in 1901, were accepted by the Navy. Protector was the first submarine to have diving planes mounted forward of the conning tower and a flat keel. Four diving planes allowed Protector to maintain depth without changing ballast tank levels, and to dive level without a down-angle. Level diving was a feature of several subsequent Lake designs, notably the first three US G-class submarines. Protector also had a lock-out chamber for divers to leave the submarine. Lake, lacking Holland's financial backing, was unable to continue building submarines in the United States. He sold Protector to Imperial Russia in 1904 as the Osetr and spent the next seven years in Europe designing submarines for the Austro-Hungarian Navy, Germany's Kaiserliche Marine, and the Imperial Russian Navy (Osetr- and Kaiman-class submarines).

He lived in Milford, Connecticut from 1907 until his death in 1945. In 1912, he founded the Lake Torpedo Boat Company in Bridgeport, Connecticut, which built 26 submarines for the United States Navy during and after World War I. Lake's first submarine for the U.S. Navy, USS G-1 (SS-19½), set a depth record of 256 feet (78 metres) in November 1912.

In 1922 the United States and other countries signed treaties limiting the size of their navies. This led to financial difficulties which forced the Lake Torpedo Boat Company to close in the mid-1920s. Following the company's closure, Lake continued designing maritime salvage systems including obtaining permission to partially salvage the Lusitania off the south Irish coast and then later a failed attempt to salvage gold from HMS Hussar, a British frigate that sank in 1780 in New York City's East River with his submarine, the Explorer. Lake redesigned the former USS O-12 (SS-73) as the Arctic exploration submarine Nautilus, used by Sir Hubert Wilkins in a 1931 expedition. He also advised the United States Navy on submarine technology and maritime salvage during World War II. Lake was a member, Freemason of Monmouth Lodge No. 172 in Atlantic Highlands, New Jersey. He later affiliated with Ansantawae Lodge No. 89 in Milford, Connecticut.

He died on June 23, 1945. A granddaughter of his was Hollywood actress Ann Sothern.

== Legacy ==
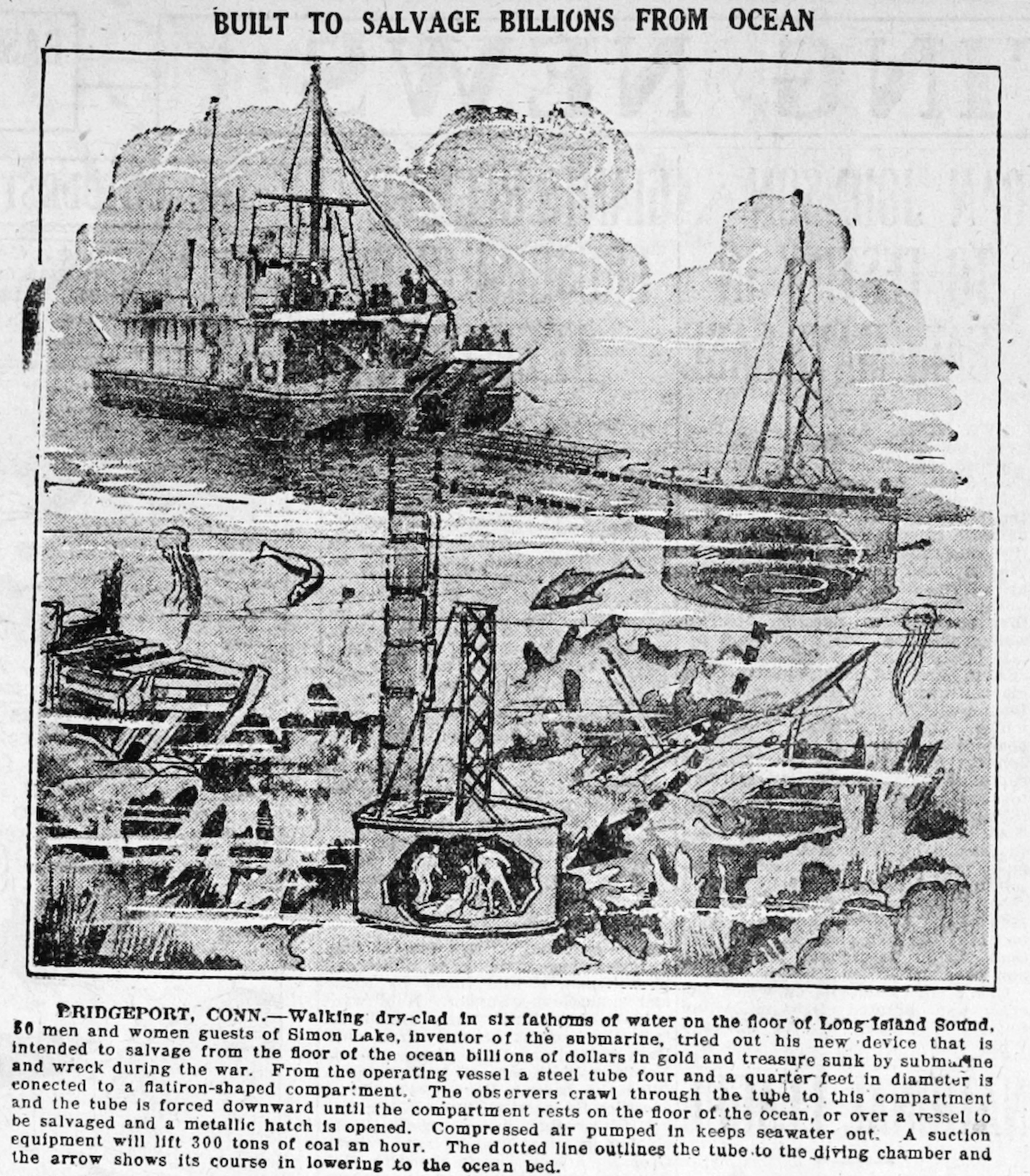
Simon Lake 1919 invention for ocean salvage

By his death, Lake had witnessed the submarine's arrival as a front-line weapon in the US Navy.

The US Navy built a class of two submarine tenders named in his honor, the Simon Lake class; USS Simon Lake (AS-33) was in service between 1964 and 1999.

In 1989 Simon Lake was inducted into the Toms River (New Jersey) Schools' Hall of Fame.

A Milford, Connecticut grammar school named in his honor closed in June 2010. Lake's Bay in West Atlantic City, New Jersey is where he tested prototypes.

An Atlantic Highlands, New Jersey street, Simon Lake Drive, at the marina was named in his honor.

== Bibliography ==
- Lake, Simon (1918). The Submarine in War and Peace. Philadelphia: J. B. Lippincott Co.
- John J. Poluhowich, Argonaut: The Submarine Legacy of Simon Lake. Texas A&M University Press, November 1999, ISBN 0-89096-894-2
