= Cesare Laurenti (engineer) =

Italian naval engineer

Cesare Laurenti (Terracina, 1865 – Rome, 1921) was an Italian naval engineer.

== Biography ==
Laurenti was a naval engineering officer who designed submarines and founded a company to build them. He devoted himself to all branches of study in underwater navigation. In 1892 he became the director of technical experiments for the first Italian submarine, Delfino, which was driven by a battery-powered electric motor and designed by Giacinto Pullino. Laurenti transformed it by adding a gasoline engine, thus allowing a large surfaced cruising range while recharging the batteries underway. In 1909-10 he designed USS G-4 for the US Navy.

Laurenti is also credited with designing or assisting with the Provana class, 1905 Glauco class, Medusa class, Argonauta, F class, and the 1914 British S class (later Italian).

== Bibliography ==
- Laurenti, Cesare (in Italian)
- Gardiner, Robert, Conway's All the World's Fighting Ships 1906–1921 Conway Maritime Press, 1985. ISBN 0-85177-245-5.
