= USS Wacondah =

Patrol vessel of the United States Navy

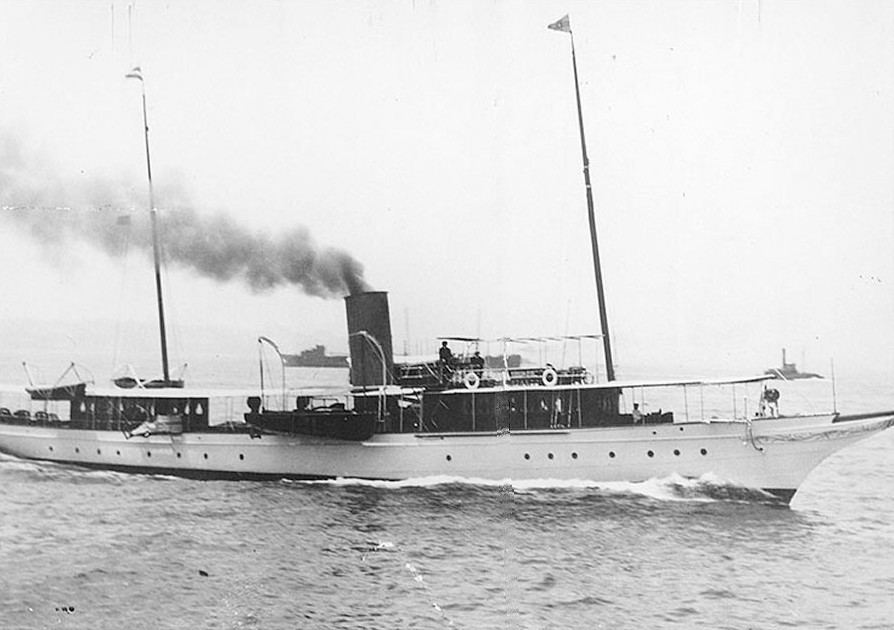
- Wacondah (American Steam Yacht, 1901) underway, prior to World War I.

History

United States
- Name: USS Wacondah
- Namesake: Name retained by the Navy
- Owner: mining engineer F. Augustus Heinze; later acquired by Boston banker Charles Hayden in 1907
- Builder: Charles L. Seabury Company and the Gas Engine and Power Company at Morris Heights, New York
- Laid down: 9/36/70
- Launched: date unknown
- Christened: as the civilian "express" yacht Revolution; renamed Wacondah by a new owner in 1907
- Completed: in 1901 at Morris Heights, New York
- Acquired: 24 May 1917
- Commissioned: USS Wacondah (SP-238) on 14 September 1917
- Decommissioned: 21 August 1919 at New York City
- Stricken: 21 August 1919
- Home port: New York City
- Fate: Sold on 4 June 1920 to the Gas Engine and Power Company
- Notes: Her name was changed to Intercolonial after service with the Navy.

General characteristics
- Type: yacht
- Tonnage: 190 gross tons
- Length: 177 ft (54 m)
- Beam: 17 ft (5.2 m)
- Draft: 7 ft 3 in (2.21 m) (mean)
- Propulsion: 1400 I.H.P. triple-expansion engine, one steam turbine, one shaft
- Speed: 18 knots
- Complement: 28 officers and enlisted
- Armament: Two 6-pounder guns; Two AA machine guns
- Armor: steel-hulled

USS Wacondah (SP-238) was an advanced-design yacht acquired by the U.S. Navy during World War I. She was outfitted as an armed patrol craft assigned to guard the New York City harbor against German submarines and to provide escort protection to commercial ships. Post-war she was sold and continued her maritime career as the yacht Intercolonial.

== A turbine-powered steam yacht ==
Revolution—a steel-hulled, screw steam yacht designed by Charles L. Seabury—was completed in 1901, at Morris Heights, New York, by the Charles L. Seabury Co. and the Gas Engine and Power Co., for mining engineer F. Augustus Heinze. One of the first American turbine-powered steam "express" yachts, Revolution was later acquired by Boston, Massachusetts, banker Charles Hayden in 1907 and renamed Wacondah.

== World War I service ==
When the United States entered World War I on 6 April 1917, the Navy soon began collecting ships and small craft from civilian owners to serve as auxiliaries and patrol craft. Inspected at the 3d Naval District, Wacondah was acquired by the Navy on 24 May 1917. Fitted out for wartime service, Wacondah was commissioned on 14 September 1917.

=== Assigned to protect New York Harbor ===
By virtue of her light construction—built for speed rather than sea-keeping -- Wacondah was restricted to "sheltered waters." Assigned to the 3d Naval District, she operated on local patrol duties out of New York Harbor for the duration of the war.

== Post-war decommissioning ==
Decommissioned and struck from the Navy list on 21 August 1919, Wacondah was sold on 4 June 1920 to the International Steamship and Trading Company and renamed Intercolonial.
