= USS Thetis (SP-391) =

Patrol vessel of the United States Navy

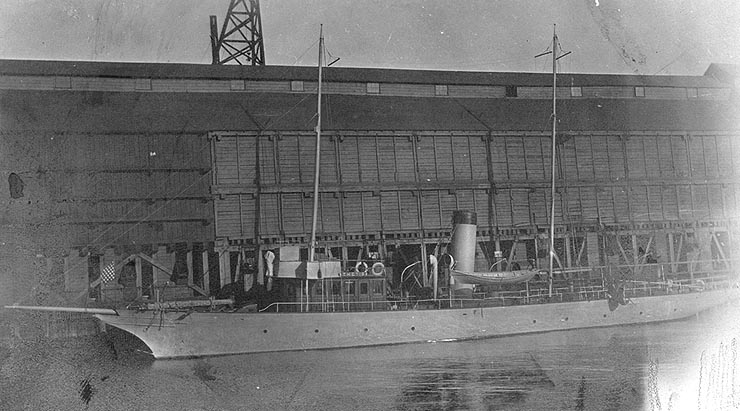
- A photograph of USS Thetis (SP-391) in port, taken by one of her quartermasters during World War I.

History

United States
- Name: USS Thetis
- Namesake: Previous name retained
- Builder: George Lawley & Son, Neponset, Massachusetts
- Completed: 1901
- Acquired: 23 June 1917
- Commissioned: 9 July 1917
- Stricken: 31 March 1919
- Fate: Sold 19 July 1920
- Notes: Operated as private yacht Thetis 1901-1917 and from 1920

General characteristics
- Type: Patrol vessel
- Displacement: 97.6 tons
- Length: 127 ft (39 m)
- Beam: 16 ft 4 in (4.98 m)
- Draft: 7 ft 6 in (2.29 m) aft
- Propulsion: Steam engine
- Speed: 12 knots
- Complement: 17
- Armament: 2 × 3-pounder guns; 2 × machine guns

The second USS Thetis (SP-391) was a United States Navy patrol vessel in commission from 1917 to 1919.

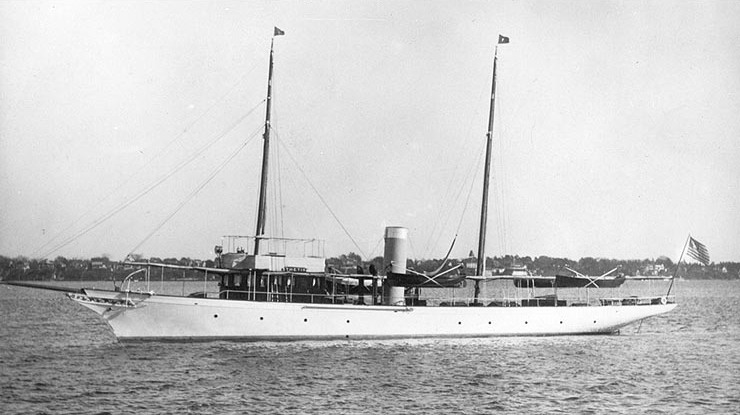
Thetis as a private yacht sometime between 1901 and 1917.

Thetis was built as a private steam yacht of the same name in 1901 by George Lawley & Son at Neponset, Massachusetts. On 23 June 1917, the U.S. Navy purchased her from Charles H. Fuller of Pawtucket, Rhode Island, for use as a patrol vessel during World War I. She was commissioned as USS Thetis (SP-391) on 9 July 1917.

Assigned to the 2nd Naval District, Thetis served on the section patrol in southern New England. She patrolled the coast of the United States between Chatham, Massachusetts, and New London, Connecticut, for the remainder of World War I.

Thetis was decommissioned after the end of the war and stricken from the Navy List on 31 March 1919. She was sold to Mr. Herman Lee Meader of New York City on 19 July 1920.
