= Medusa-class submarine =

Class of Italian submarines

The Medusa class of submarines were eight submarines built for the Italian Regia Marina (Royal Navy) and one for Portugal between 1911 and 1913. They displaced 305 tons while submerged, and could travel as fast as 8 knots (15 km/h; 9.2 mph). The class consisted of Vellella, Medusa, Argo, Jalea, Espadarte (built for Portugal), Fisalia, Zoea, Salpa, and Jantina. Two of the submarines were sunk during World War I, both in 1915: Medusa was torpedoed by the Imperial German Navy submarine SM UB-15 on 10 June, and on 17 August Jalea hit a naval mine and sank. In 1918 the other five Italian submarines were stricken, while Espadarte was in service in the Portuguese Navy until 1928.
