= List of United States Navy ships: Q–R =

Ships of the United States Navy

Ships in current service
- Current ships

Ships grouped alphabetically
- A–B; C; D–F; G–H; I–K; L; M; N–O; P; Q–R; S; T–V; W–Z

Ships grouped by type
- Aircraft carriers; Airships; Amphibious warfare ships; Auxiliaries; Battlecruisers; Battleships; Cruisers; Destroyers; Destroyer escorts; Destroyer leaders; Escort carriers; Frigates; Hospital ships; Littoral combat ships; Mine warfare vessels; Monitors; Oilers; Patrol vessels; Registered civilian vessels; Sailing frigates; Steam frigates; Steam gunboats; Ships of the line; Sloops of war; Submarines; Torpedo boats; Torpedo retrievers; Unclassified miscellaneous; Yard and district craft

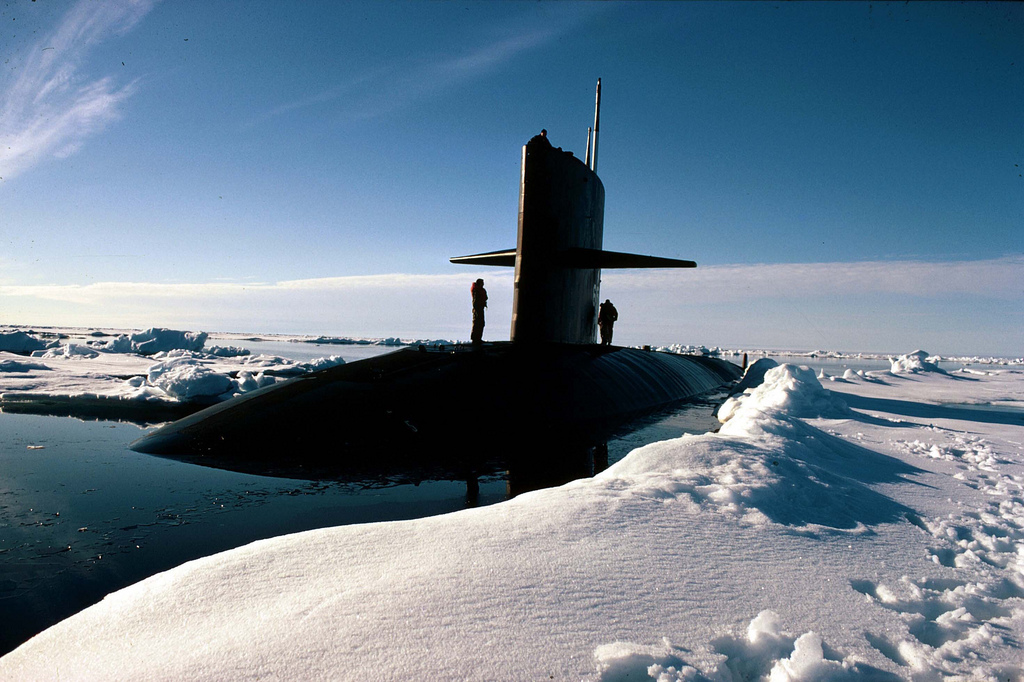
USS Queenfish (SSN-651)

This section of the list of United States Navy ships contains all ships of the United States Navy with names beginning with Q and R.

For a list exclusively of currently commissioned ships, see the List of current ships of the United States Navy.

For ships with unique names, "USS Ship‍name" redirects to the ship article. For reused names, "USS Ship‍name" is an index page for the ships of that name; the links after the name lead to the specific ship pages.

== Q ==
- USS Quail (AM-15, AM-377/MSF-377)
- USS Quaker City (1854)
- USS Quapaw (AT-110/ATF-110)
- USS Quartz (IX-150)
- USS Quastinet (AOG-39)
- USS Queen (1863)
- USS Queen Charlotte (1813)
- USS Queen City (1863)
- USS Queen of France (1777)
- USS Queen of the West (1854)
- USS Queenfish (SS-393/AGSS-393, SSN-651)
- USS Queens (APA-103)
- USS Quentin Walsh (DDG-132)
- USS Quest (SP-171, AM-281)
- USS Quevilly (1918)
- USS Qui Vive (SP-1004)
- USS Quick (DD-490/DMS-32)
- USS Quicksilver (SP-281)
- USS Quileute (YTB-540/YTM-540)
- USS Quillback (SS-424)
- USS Quincy (AK-10, CA-39, CA-71)
- USS Quinnapin (YT-286)
- USS Quinnebaug (1866, 1875, SP-1687, SP-2478, AOG-71)
- USS Quinsigamond (1864)
- USS Quirinus (ARL-39)
- USS Quiros (PG-40, IX-140)
- USS Quonset (YFB-40)

== R ==
- USS R-1 (SS-78)
- USS R-2 (SS-79)
- USS R-3 (SS-80)
- USS R-4 (SS-81)
- USS R-5 (SS-82)
- USS R-6 (SS-83)
- USS R-7 (SS-84)
- USS R-8 (SS-85)
- USS R-9 (SS-86)
- USS R-10 (SS-87)
- USS R-11 (SS-88)
- USS R-12 (SS-89)
- USS R-13 (SS-90)
- USS R-14 (SS-91)
- USS R-15 (SS-92)
- USS R-16 (SS-93)
- USS R-17 (SS-94)
- USS R-18 (SS-95)
- USS R-19 (SS-96)
- USS R-20 (SS-97)
- USS R-21 (SS-98)
- USS R-22 (SS-99)
- USS R-23 (SS-100)
- USS R-24 (SS-101)
- USS R-25 (SS-102)
- USS R-26 (SS-103)
- USS R-27 (SS-104)
- USS R. B. Forbes (1845)
- USS R. E. & A. H. Watson (1859)
- USS R. E. Lee (1863)
- USS R. Ney McNeely (YAG-51)
- USS R. R. Cuyler (1860)
- USS R. W. Wilmot (SP-604)

=== Ra ===
- USS Raazoo (SP-508)
- USS Rabaul (CVE-121/CVHE-121/AKV-21)
- USS Raboco (SP-310)
- USS Raby (DE-190, DE-698/DEC-698)
- USS Raccoon (SP-506, IX-127)
- USS Raccoon River (LSM(R)-520)
- USS Racehorse (1775)
- USS Racer (1861, IX-100)
- USS Rachel Seaman (1861)
- USS Racine (PG-208/PF-100, LST-1191)
- USNS Radcliffe (T-AG-188)
- USS Radford (DD-120/AG-22, DD-446/DDE-446)
- USS Radiant (ID-1324, AMc-99)
- USS Radnor (ID-3023)
- USS Raeo (SP-588)
- USS Rafael Peralta (DDG-115)
- USS Rail (AM-26/AT-139/ATO-139, AMCU-37/MHC-37)
- USS Rainbow (AS-7)
- USS Rainier (1917, AE-5, AOE-7/T-AOE-7)
- USS Rainy River (LSM(R)-521)
- USS Raleigh (1776, C-8, CL-7, LPD-1)
- USS Rall (DE-304)
- USS Ralph Johnson (DDG-114)
- USS Ralph Talbot (DD-390)
- USS Ramage (DDG-61)
- USS Ramapo (AO-12)
- USS Rambler (SP-211)
- USS Ramona (IX-76)
- USS Rampart (AM-282/MSF-282)
- USS Ramsay (DD-124/DM-16/AG-98)
- USS Ramsden (DE-382/WDE-482/DER-382)
- USS Ramsey (DEG-2/FFG-2)
- USS Randall (APA-224)
- USS Randolph (1776, CV-15)
- USS Randwijk (ID-2546)
- USNS Range Recoverer (T-AG-161/T-AGM-2)
- USS Range Sentinel (AGM-22/T-AGM-22)
- USNS Range Tracker (T-AG-160/T-AGM-1)
- USS Ranger (1777, 1814, 1814, 1876, SP-237, SP-369, CC-4, CV-4, CVA-61)
- USS Rankin (AKA-103LKA-103)
- USS Ransom (AM-283/MSF-283)
- USS Ransom B. Fuller (1902)
- USS Rapidan (AO-18)
- USS Rapido (1891)
- USS Rappahannock (ID-1854/AF-6, AOG-2, T-AO-204)
- USS Raritan (1843, WYT-93, LSM-540)
- USS Rasher (SS-269/SSR-269/AGSS-269/IXSS-269)
- USS Rathburne (DD-113/APD-25, DE-1057/FF-1057)
- USS Raton (SS-270/SSR-270/AGSS-270)
- USS Rattler (1862)
- USS Rattlesnake (1813)
- USS Raven (1813, AM-49, AM-55/MSF-55, MHC-61)
- USS Raven III (SP-103)
- USS Rawlins (APA-226)
- USS Ray (SS-271/SSR-271, SSN-653)
- USS Ray K. Edwards (DE-237/APD-96)
- USS Ray Mabus (DDG-147)
- USS Raymon W. Herndon (DE-688/APD-121)
- USS Raymond (ID-2057, DE-341)
- USS Raymond J. Anderton (SP-530)
- USS Razorback (SS-394)

=== Re ===
- USS Reading (PG-174/PF-66)
- USS Ready (PG-67, PGM-87/PG-87)
- USS Reaper (AMc-96, AM-467/MSO-467)
- USS Reasoner (DE-1063/FF-1063)
- USS Rebecca Sims (1801)
- USS Rebel (AM-284/MSF-284)
- USS Reclaimer (ARS-42)
- USS Recovery (ARS-43)
- USS Recruit (AM-285/MSF-285, TDE-1/TFFG-1)
- USS Red Cloud (YT-268/YTB-268/YTM-268, T-AKR-313)
- USS Red Oak Victory (AK-235)
- USS Red River (LSM(R)-522/LFR-522)
- USS Red Rover (1859)
- USS Redbud (WLB-398/AKL-398/T-AKL-398)
- USS Redfin (SS-272/SSR-272/AGSS-272)
- USS Redfish (SS-395/AGSS-395, SSN-680)
- USS Redhead (AMS-34/AMCU-48/MHC-48, AM-409)
- USS Redmill (DE-89)
- USS Rednour (DE-592/APD-102)
- USS Redpoll (AMS-57/MSC(O)-57)
- USS Redstart (AM-378/MSF-378)
- USNS Redstone (T-AGM-20)
- USS Redwing (AM-48/WAT-48/ARS-4, AMS-200/MSC-200, YTB-783)
- USS Redwood (YN-25/AN-30)
- USS Reedbird (AMc-30, YMS-291/AMS-51/MSC(O)-51)
- USS Reefer (1846)
- USS Reeves (DE-94, DE-156/APD-52, DLG-24/CG-24)
- USS Reform (AM-286)
- USS Refresh (AM-287)
- USS Refuge (AH-11)
- USS Regis II (SP-1083)
- USS Register (DE-308, DE-233/APD-92)
- USS Regulus (AK-14, AF-57, T-AK-292/T-AKR-292)
- USS Rehoboth (SP-384, AVP-50/AGS-50)
- USS Reid (DD-21, DD-292, DD-369, FFG-30)
- USS Reign (AM-288/MSF-288)
- USS Reina Mercedes (IX-25)
- USS Reindeer (1863, YT-115/YTM-115, ATA-189)
- USS Release (1855)
- USNS Relentless (T-AGOS-18)
- USS Reliable (SP-352, AMc-100)
- USS Reliance (1860, AFDL-47, WSC-150)
- Reliant (YT-803)
- USS Relief (1836, 1896, YP-2, SP-2170, 1904, AH-1)
- USS Remey (DD-688)
- USS Remlik (SP-157)
- USS Remora (SS-487)
- USS Remus (ARL-40)
- USS Renate (AKA-36, AKL-42)
- USS Rendova (CVE-114/AKV-14)
- USS Reno (DD-303, CL-96/CLAA-96)
- USS Renshaw (1862, DD-176, DD-499/DDE-499)
- USS Rentz (FFG-46)
- USS Renville (APA-227/LPA-227)
- USS Report (AM-289/MSF-289/AGP-289)
- USS Repose (AH-16)
- USS Reposo II (SP-198)
- USS Reprisal (1776, CV-30, CV-35)
- USS Reproof (AM-290)
- USS Republic (AP-33)
- USS Republican River (LSM(R)-523)
- USS Repulse (1775)
- USS Requin (SS-481/SSR-481)
- USS Requisite (AM-109/AGS-18)
- USS Resaca (1865)
- USS Rescue (1850, 1861, SP-3209, AH-18)
- USS Rescuer (ARS-18)
- USS Resistance (1776)
- USS Resolute (1860, 1894, SP-1309, SP-3218, SP-3003, YT-458, AFDM-10, T-JHSV-5)
- USS Resourceful (AFDM-5)
- USS Restless (1861, 1887, PG-66)
- USS Restorer (ARS-17)
- USS Retaliation (1778, 1798)
- USS Retalick (DE-90)
- USS Retort (PYc-49)
- USS Retriever (ARS-44)
- USS Reuben James (DD-245, DE-153/DER-153, FFG-57)
- USS Revenge (1776, 1777, 1806, 1813, 1822, AM-110/MSF-110)
- USS Rexburg (PCE(R)-855/EPCE(R)-855)
- USS Reybold (DE-275, DE-177)
- USS Reyner and Son (SP-869)
- USS Reynolds (DE-42, DE-91)

=== Rh–Ri ===
- USS Rhea (AMc-58, AMS-52/MSC(O)-52)
- USS Rhebal (SP-1195)
- USS Rhind (DD-404)
- USS Rhode Island (1861, BB-17, SSBN-730, SSBN-740)
- USS Rhodes (DE-384/DER-384)
- USCGC Rhododendron (WAGL-267)
- USS Rhodolite (PYc-19)
- USS Rice County (LST-1089)
- USS Rich (DE-695, DD-820)
- USS Richard B. Anderson (DD-786)
- USS Richard B. Russell (SSN-687)
- USS Richard Bulkeley (1917)
- USS Richard Caswell (1900)
- USS Richard E. Byrd (DDG-23, T-AKE-4)
- USS Richard E. Kraus (DD-849/AG-151)
- USS Richard G. Lugar (DDG-136)
- USNS Richard G. Matthiesen (T-AOT-1124)
- USS Richard J. Danzig (DDG-143)
- USS Richard L. Page (DEG-5/FFG-5)
- USS Richard M. McCool Jr. (LPD-29)
- USS Richard M. Rowell (DE-403)
- USS Richard P. Leary (DD-664)
- USS Richard Peck (IX-96)
- USS Richard Richardson (YAG-52)
- USRC Richard Rush (1874)
- USS Richard S. Bull (DE-402)
- USS Richard S. Edwards (DD-950)
- USS Richard Vaux (1864)
- USS Richard W. Suesens (DE-342)
- USS Richey (DE-385/WDE-485)
- USNS Richfield (T-AGM-4)
- USS Richland (AK-207, AFDM-8)
- USS Richmond (1798, 1860, CL-9)
- USS Richmond K. Turner (DLG-20/CG-20)
- USS Ricketts (DE-254)
- USS Rickwood (SP-597)
- USS Riddle (DE-185)
- USS Ridgway (PC-1193)
- USS Riette (SP-107)
- USS Rigel (AD-13/ARb-1/AR-11, AF-58/T-AF-58)
- USS Right (AM-110)
- USS Rijndam (ID-2505)
- USS Rijnland (ID-2718)
- USS Riley (DE-579)
- USS Rin Tin Tin (1883)
- USNS Rincon (T-AOG-77)
- USS Rinehart (DE-196)
- USS Ringgold (DD-89, DD-500)
- USS Ringness (DE-590/APD-100/LPR-100)
- USS Rio Bravo (1875)
- USS Rio de la Plata (AVG-30)
- USS Rio Grande (AOG-3)
- USS Riou (DE-92)
- USS Ripley (PC-808)
- USS Ripple (ID-2439/YFB-5)
- USS Risk (AM-291)
- USS Rival (AM-292, AM-468/MSO-468)
- USS Rivalen (SP-63)
- USS Rivera (YFB-685)
- USS Riverhead (PC-567)
- USS Riverside (1890, APA-102)
- USS Rixey (APH-3)
- USS Rizal (DD-174/DM-14)
- USS Rizzi (DE-537)

=== Roa–Roe ===
- USS Road Runner (AMc-35)
- USS Roamer (SP-1047, AF-19)
- USS Roanoke (1814, 1855, ID-1695, PG-201, CL-114, CL-145, T-AO-155, AOR-7)
- USS Roark (DE-1053/FF-1053)
- USS Robalo (SS-273)
- USS Robert A. Owens (DD-827)
- USNS Robert Ballard (T-AGS-67)
- USS Robert Brazier (DE-345)
- USS Robert Center (YX-17)
- USS Robert D. Conrad (T-AGOR-3)
- USS Robert E. Lee (SSBN-601)
- USS Robert E. Peary (DE-132, DE-1073/FF-1073, T-AKE-5)
- USS Robert E. Simanek (ESB-7)
- USS Robert F. Keller (DE-419)
- USNS Robert F. Kennedy (T-AO-208)
- USS Robert G. Bradley (FFG-49)
- USS Robert H. McCard (DD-822)
- USS Robert H. McCurdy (ID-3157)
- USS Robert H. Smith (DD-735/DM-23/MMD-23)
- USS Robert I. Paine (DE-578/DER-578)
- USS Robert K. Huntington (DD-781)
- USS Robert Kerrey (DDG-146)
- USS Robert L. Barnes (ID-3088/AK-11/AO-14/AG-27)
- USS Robert L. Wilson (DD-847)
- USS Robert M. Thompson (ID-3319)
- USS Robert R. Ingram (DDG-149)
- USS Robert Smith (DD-324)
- USS Roberts (DE-749)
- USS Robin (AM-3/AT-140/ATO-140, MHC-54, AMS-53/MSC(O)-53)
- USS Robin Doncaster
- USS Robin Hood (1861)
- USS Robinson (DD-88, DD-562)
- USS Robison (DDG-12)
- USS Rochambeau (AP-63)
- USS Roche (DE-197)
- USS Rochester (CA-2, CA-73, CA-124/CG-13)
- USS Rock (SS-274/SSR-274/AGSS-274)
- USS Rockaway (AVP-29/AG-123/WAGO-377/WHEC-377/WOLE-377)
- USS Rockbridge (APA-228/LPA-228)
- USS Rockdale (AK-208)
- USS Rocket (1862, YT-22, AMc-101)
- USS Rockford (PG-156/PF-48)
- USS Rockingham (APA-229/LPA-229)
- USS Rockport (1876, SP-738)
- USS Rockville (PCE(R)-851/EPCE(R)-851)
- USS Rockwall (APA-230)
- USS Rocky Mount (AGC-3)
- USS Rod (SP-3114)
- USS Rodgers (1879, TB-4, DD-254)
- USS Rodman (DD-456/DMS-21)
- USS Rodney M. Davis (FFG-60)
- USS Rodolph (1863)
- USS Roe (DD-24, DD-418)
- USS Roebuck (1856)
- USS Roepat (ID-2536)

=== Rog–Roy ===
- USS Rogday (ID-3583)
- RV Roger Revelle (T-AGOR-24) (Operated by Scripps Institution of Oceanography)
- USS Rogers (DD-876/DDR-876, DE-772)
- USS Rogers Blood (DE-555, DE-605/APD-115)
- USS Roi (CVE-103)
- USS Rolette (AKA-99)
- USS Rolf (DE-362)
- USS Rolla (PC-483)
- USS Roller (AMc-52)
- USS Rolling Wave (1860s)
- USNS Rollins (T-AG-189)
- USS Romain (IX-89)
- USS Roman (1835)
- USS Rombach (DE-364)
- USS Romeo (1862)
- USS Romulus (ARL-22)
- USS Ronaki (IX-94)
- USS Ronald Reagan (CVN-76)
- USS Roncador (SS-301/AGSS-301/IXSS-301)
- USS Rondo (SP-90, ID-2488)
- USS Rondout (ID-3200)
- USS Ronquil (SS-396)
- USS Rooks (DD-804)
- USS Roosevelt (1905, DDG-80)
- USS Roper (DD-147/APD-20)
- USS Roque (AG-137/AKL-8)
- USS Rosa (SP-757)
- USS Rosal (YFB-682)
- USS Rosalie (1863)
- USS Rose (1863, 1916)
- USNS Rose Knot (T-AGM-14)
- USS Rose Mary (SP-1216)
- USS Rosedale (SP-3079)
- USS Roselle (SP-350, AM-379/MSF-379)
- USS Rosewood (YN-26/AN-31)
- USS Ross (DD-563, DDG-71)
- USS Rotanin (AK-108)
- USS Rotary (YO-148)
- USS Roustabout (YO-53)
- USS Rowan (TB-8, DD-64, DD-405, DD-782)
- USS Rowe (DD-564)
- USS Rowley (DE-95)
- USS Roxane (AKA-37)
- USS Roy O. Hale (DE-336/DER-336)
- USS Royal (AMc-102)
- USS Royal Palm (YN-69)
- USS Royal Savage (1775)
- USS Royone (IX-235)
- USS Royston (YFB-44)

=== Ru–Ry ===
- USS Ruby (PY-21)
- USS Ruchamkin (DE-228/APD-89/LPR-89)
- USS Rudderow (DE-224)
- USS Ruddy (AM-380/MSF-380)
- USS Rudolph Blumberg (ID-3008)
- USS Rudyerd Bay (CVE-81/CVU-81/AKV-29)
- USS Ruff (AMc-59, AMS-54/MSC(O)-54)
- USS Runels (DE-793/APD-85)
- USS Runner (SS-275, SS-476/AGSS-476)
- USS Rupert (DE-96)
- USS Rupertus (DD-851)
- USS Rush (SP-712, WPC-151/WSC-151, WHEC-723, WMSM-918)
- USS Rushmore (LSD-14, LSD-47)
- USS Rushville (PCS-1380)
- USS Russ (SP-1151)
- USS Russell (DD-414, DDG-59)
- USS Russell County (LST-1090)
- USS Russell M. Cox (DE-774)
- USNS Ruth Bader Ginsburg (T-AO-212)
- USS Rutherford (DE-93)
- USS Rutilicus (AK-113)
- USS Rutland (APA-192/LPA-192)
- USS Rutoma (SP-78)
- USS Ryer (AG-138/AKL-9)
