= Rickwood =

Rickwood may refer to:

- Chris Rickwood (b. 1973), an American composer
- Dan Rickwood (b. 1968), an English artist who uses the pseudonym Stanley Donwood
- Frank Rickwood (1921–2009), Australian geologist and businessman.
- Rickwood Caverns State Park, a state park in Warrior, Alabama, in the United States
- The Rickwood Classic, an annual "throwback" game played by the Birmingham Barons baseball team in the United States
- Rickwood Field, a baseball field in Birmingham, Alabama, in the United States
- USS Rickwood (SP-597), a United States Navy patrol boat in commission from 1917 to 1919
