= USS Radiant =

USS Radiant is a name used more than once by the United States Navy, and may refer to:

- USS Radiant (ID-1324), the proposed naval designation for the civilian tug Radiant, which was registered for possible naval service during World War I but never commissioned
- USS Radiant (AMc-99), a coastal minesweeper in commission from 1942 to 1945
