= USS Rogers Blood =

USS Rogers Blood has been the name of more than one United States Navy ship, and may refer to:

- USS Rogers Blood (DE-555), a destroyer escort cancelled in 1944
- USS Rogers Blood (DE-605), a destroyer escort converted during construction into the fast transport USS Rogers Blood (APD-115)
- USS Rogers Blood (APD-115), a fast transport in commission from 1945 to 1946
