= USS Rocket =

USS Rocket is a name used more than once by the United States Navy:

- USS Rocket (1862) was a wooden harbor tug J. P. Billard, was purchased for the Navy 12 October 1863.
- USS Rocket (YT-22) was a steel-hulled tug, built in 1899.
- USS Rocket (AMc-101) was a coastal minesweeper, was laid down 6 September 1941.
