= USS Racer =

USS Racer is a name used more than once by the United States Navy:

- USS Racer (1861), a schooner used in the American Civil War.
- USS Racer (IX-100), a patrol craft placed in service 27 May 1943.
