= USS Ruff =

USS Ruff is a name used twice by the United States Navy for minesweepers;

- USS Ruff (AMc-59), a coastal minesweeper laid down in 1940.
- USS Ruff (YMS-327), a minesweeper commissioned 19 April 1943.
