= USS Quest =

USS Quest is a name used more than once by the U.S. Navy for its vessels:

- USS Quest (SP-171), built in 1916 by the Greenport Basin and Drydock Co., Long Island, New York
- USS Quest (AM-281), laid down 24 November 1943 by Gulf Shipbuilding Co., Chickasaw, Alabama
