= USS Reedbird =

USS Reedbird is a name used more than once by the U.S. Navy:

- USS Reedbird (AMc-30), a coastal minesweeper placed in service 29 April 1941.
- USS Reedbird (YMS-291), a minesweeper commissioned 9 August 1943.
