= USS Reindeer =

USS Reindeer is a name used more than once by the U.S. Navy:

- USS Reindeer (1863), a Civil War gunboat placed in service early in July 1863.
- USS Reindeer (YT-115), a coal-burning harbor tug that developed 450 horsepower (340 kW), built in 1920.
- USS Reindeer (ATA-189), originally projected as ATR-116, commissioned 20 December 1944.
