= USS Racine =

USS Racine has been the name of two ships of the United States Navy. Both ships are named for the city of Racine, Wisconsin.

- USS Racine (PF-100), a Tacoma-class patrol frigate, which served from 1945 until 1946.
- USS Racine (LST-1191), a tank landing ship which served from 1971 until 1993.
