= USS Roselle =

USS Roselle has been the name of more than one United States Navy ship, and may refer to:

- USS Roselle (SP-350), a minesweeper in commission from September to December 1917
- USS Roselle (AM-379) (later MSF-379), a minesweeper in commission from 1944 to 1945
