= USS Rockport =

USS Rockport may refer to the following ships operated by the United States Navy:

- USS Nantucket (IX-18) once bore the name Rockport during her 65-year career. She was a screw steamer serving from 1876 to 1940
- USS Rockport (SP-738) a wooden scientific research vessel originally named Ajax. Serving from 1917 to 1919
