= USS Quail =

USS Quail may refer to the following ships of the United States Navy:

- USS Quail (AM-15) was laid down 14 May 1918 by the Chester Shipbuilding Co., Chester, Pennsylvania.
- USS Quail (AM-377) which was laid down by the Savannah Machine and Foundry Co., Savannah, Georgia.
