= USS Rhea =

USS Rhea is a name used by the U.S. Navy for:

- USS Rhea (AMc-58), a coastal minesweeper launched 9 August 1941
- USS Rhea (AMS-52), a minesweeper launched 14 November 1942
