= USS Roamer =

USS Roamer is a name used more than once by the United States Navy and may refer to:

- USS Roamer (SP-1047), a patrol boat in commission from 1917 to 1919
- USS Roamer (AF-19), a cargo ship in commission from 1942 to 1946
