= USS Reliable =

Ship name

USS Reliable has been the name of more than one United States Navy ship, and may refer to:

- USS Reliable (SP-352), an unidentified vessel at least considered for service during World War I (1917–1918) for which no records have been found
- USS Reliable (AMc-100), a coastal minesweeper commissioned in 1942 and stricken in 1945
