= USS Raccoon =

Ship name

USS Raccoon has been the name of more than one United States Navy ship, and may refer to:

- USS Raccoon (SP-506), a patrol boat in commission from 1917 to 1919
- USS Raccoon (IX-127), a tanker in commission from 1944 to 1946
