= USS R. W. Wilmot =

Patrol vessel of the United States Navy

History

United States
- Name: USS R. W. Wilmot
- Namesake: Previous name retained
- Builder: Globe Iron Works Company, Cleveland, Ohio
- Completed: 1898
- Acquired: 4 January 1918
- Commissioned: 26 January 1918
- Decommissioned: 4 April 1918
- Fate: Transferred to government of France 4 April 1918
- Notes: Operated as commercial tug R. W. Wilmot 1898-1917

General characteristics
- Type: Patrol vessel
- Tonnage: 569 gross register tons
- Length: 156 ft 8 in (47.75 m)
- Beam: 30 ft (9.1 m)
- Draft: 14 ft 6 in (4.42 m)
- Propulsion: Steam engine
- Speed: 12 knots
- Armament: 1 × 3-inch (76.2-mm) gun; 2 × machine guns

USS R. W. Wilmot (SP-604) was a United States Navy patrol vessel in commission from January to April 1918.

R. W. Wilmot was built as a commercial steam tug of the same name by Globe Iron Works Company, Cleveland, Ohio, in 1898. On 4 January 1918, the U.S. Navy acquired her from her owner, the River and Ocean Towing Company of Wilmington, Delaware, for use as a section patrol boat during World War I. She was commissioned on 26 January 1918 as USS R. W. Wilmot (SP-604).

Assigned to the 5th Squadron, Patrol Force, United States Atlantic Fleet, R. W. Wilmot operated in the Mid-Atlantic and southern New England area until 9 March 1918. Selected for "distant service," she departed the United States on 17 March 1918 bound for France. After her arrival there she was simultaneously decommissioned and transferred to the government of France on 4 April 1918.
