= USS Runner =

Two ships of the United States Navy have borne the name USS Runner, named for the runner, an amberfish inhabiting subtropical waters, so called for its rapid leaps from the water.

- The first, USS Runner (SS-275), was a Gato-class submarine, launched in 1942 and lost in 1943.
- The second, USS Runner (SS-476), was a Tench-class submarine, launched in 1944 and struck in 1971.
