= USS Robin =

USS Robin may refer to the following ships of the United States Navy:

- USS Robin (AM-3) (later ATO-140), laid down 4 March 1918 by the Todd Shipyard Corp., New York
- USS Robin (AMS-53), laid down as YMS-311 on 7 May 1943 by Henry B. Nevins, Inc., City Island, New York
- USS Robin (MHC-54), an Osprey-class coastal mine hunter

== See also ==
- USS Robin, code name for the British Illustrious-class aircraft carrier HMS Victorious while operating with the United States Navy in 1943
