= USS Richard E. Byrd =

Two ships of the United States Navy have borne the name Richard E. Byrd, in honor of polar explorer Rear Admiral Richard E. Byrd (1888–1957).

- USS Richard E. Byrd (DDG-23) was a Charles F. Adams-class guided missile destroyer, launched in 1962 and struck in 1992. The ship was sold to Greece to provide spare parts for other ships, and sunk as a target in 2003.
- USNS Richard E. Byrd (T-AKE-4) is a Lewis and Clark-class dry cargo ship, launched in 2007.
