= USS Retaliation =

USS Retaliation may refer to the following ships of the United States Navy:

- USS Retaliation (1778), was a brigantine which operated in the Continental Navy
- USS Retaliation (1798), was a French privateer captured by the United States during the Quasi-War
