= USS Quastinet =

History

United States
- Name: USS Quastinet
- Namesake: Quashnet River in Massachusetts
- Builder: East Coast Shipyard, Inc., Bayonne, New Jersey
- Laid down: 2 August 1944
- Launched: 24 September 1944
- Commissioned: 6 November 1944
- Decommissioned: 16 April 1946
- Stricken: 21 May 1946
- Identification: IMO number: 5054020
- Fate: Transferred to Maritime Commission, 9 September 1946

General characteristics
- Class & type: Mettawee-class gasoline tanker
- Type: Type T1-M-A2 tanker
- Tonnage: 1,228 long tons deadweight (DWT)
- Displacement: 846 long tons (860 t) light; 2,270 long tons (2,306 t) full load
- Length: 220 ft 6 in (67.21 m)
- Beam: 37 ft (11 m)
- Draft: 13 ft 1 in (3.99 m)
- Propulsion: Diesel direct drive, single screw, 720 hp (537 kW)
- Speed: 10 knots (19 km/h; 12 mph)
- Complement: 62
- Armament: 1 × 3"/50 caliber gun; 2 × single 40 mm guns; 3 × single 20 mm guns

USS Quastinet (AOG-39) was a Mettawee-class gasoline tanker acquired by the U.S. Navy for the dangerous task of transporting gasoline to warships in the fleet, and to remote Navy stations.

Quastinet was named by the U.S. Navy after Quastinet, a river in Massachusetts.

== Construction ==
Quastinet, sponsored by Mrs. E.S. Chappelear, was laid down on 2 August 1944 as MC hull 1802 by East Coast Shipyard, Inc., Bayonne, New Jersey. Constructed and converted concurrently, the vessel was launched on 24 September 1944. Acquired by the Navy from the Maritime Commission on 28 October 1944, the ship was commissioned on 6 November 1944.

== East Coast operations ==
Following shakedown, Quastinet reported for duty to Commander, Service Force, Atlantic, on 28 January 1945.

== Decommissioning ==
Following assignment to the 12th Naval District, Quastinet was decommissioned 16 April 1946 and struck from the Naval Vessel Register on 21 May. She was transferred to the Maritime Commission on 9 September 1946.
