= USS Raazoo =

Patrol vessel of the United States Navy

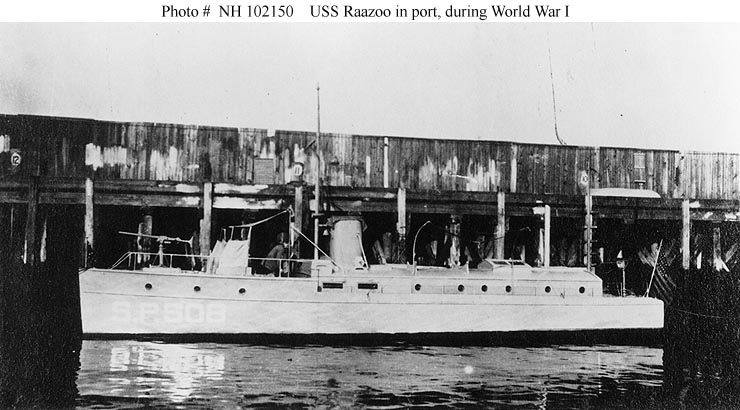
- USS Raazoo (SP-508) during World War I.

History

United States
- Name: USS Raazoo
- Namesake: Previous name retained
- Builder: Robert Jacobs, City Island, the Bronx, New York
- Completed: 1916
- Acquired: 2 June 1917
- Commissioned: 21 July 1917
- Fate: Returned to owner 3 May 1919
- Notes: Operated as private motorboat Boomerang II and Raazoo 1916-1917 and Raazoo from 1919

General characteristics
- Type: Patrol vessel
- Tonnage: 22 gross register tons
- Length: 62 ft (19 m)
- Beam: 10 ft 6 in (3.20 m)
- Draft: 3 ft (0.91 m)
- Speed: 27 knots
- Complement: 9
- Armament: 1 × 1-pounder gun; 1 × machine gun

USS Raazoo (SP-508) was a United States Navy patrol vessel in commission from 1917 to 1919.

Raazoo was built as the private pleasure boat Boomerang II in 1916 by Robert Jacobs at City Island in the Bronx, New York. She later was renamed Raazoo.

On 2 June 1917, the U.S. Navy acquired Raazoo under a free lease from her owner, Edward G. Burghard of New York City, for use as a section patrol vessel during World War I. She was commissioned as USS Raazoo (SP-508) on 21 July 1917.

Assigned to Squadron 11, Division 32, of the United States Atlantic Fleet and attached to the 3rd Naval District, Raazoo operated initially as a dispatch boat in the New York Marine Basin. She later served as an experimental ship with Naval Air Station Rockaway and Naval Air Station Montauk Point.

Decommissioned after World War I, Raazoo was returned to Burghard on 3 May 1919.
