= USS Raboco =

Patrol vessel of the United States Navy

History

United States
- Name: USS Raboco
- Namesake: Previous name retained
- Builder: Racine Boat Company, Racine, Wisconsin
- Completed: 1913
- Acquired: 19 May 1917
- Commissioned: 5 July or 7 July 1917
- Fate: Returned to owner 7 January 1919
- Notes: Operated as civilian motorboat Raboco 1913 to 1917 and from 1919

General characteristics
- Type: Patrol vessel
- Tonnage: 39 tons
- Length: 65 ft (20 m)
- Beam: 14 ft (4.3 m)
- Draft: 3 ft 6 in (1.07 m)
- Speed: 9 knots
- Complement: 9

USS Raboco (SP-310) was an armed motorboat that served in the United States Navy as a patrol vessel from 1917 to 1919.

Raboco was built as a civilian motorboat of the same name in 1913 by the Racine Boat Company at Racine, Wisconsin. The U.S. Navy acquired Raboco on a free lease from her owner, Harry C. Good of Moline, Illinois, on 19 May 1917 for World War I service as a patrol vessel. Sources agree that she was commissioned as USS Raboco (SP-310) on 5 July 1917; however, one source also states that she was delivered to the Navy on 7 July 1917, raising the possibility that 7 July might have been her true commissioning date.

For the rest of World War I, Raboco served on the Great Lakes with the coastal defense forces of the 9th, 10th, and 11th Naval Districts—at the time a single administrative entity made up of the 9th Naval District, 10th Naval District, and 11th Naval District—operating principally between Sault Ste. Marie, Michigan, and Naval Training Station Great Lakes at North Chicago, Illinois.

Raboco was decommissioned soon after the end of the war and returned to her owner on 7 January 1919.
