= USS Rival =

Two ships of the United States Navy have been assigned the name USS Rival.

- USS Rival (AM-292) would have been an Admirable-class minesweeper. Construction, however, was canceled on 6 June 1944, prior to completion.
- USS Rival (MSO-468) was an Aggressive-class minesweeper, originally designated AM-421, then as AM-468. She was launched in 1953, reclassified as an ocean minesweeper, MSO-468, in 1955, and struck in 1971.
