= USS Restless =

USS Restless is a name used more than once by the U.S. Navy:

- USS Restless (1861), a barque commissioned during the American Civil War.
- Restless, a steam tug, built at St. Louis in 1861, was transferred by the War Department to the Navy on 30 September 1862 and renamed Mistletoe.
- USS Restless (1887), a schooner-rigged yacht.
- USS Restless (PG-66), a patrol gunboat launched 21 February 1940.
