= USS Reposo II =

Patrol vessel of the United States Navy

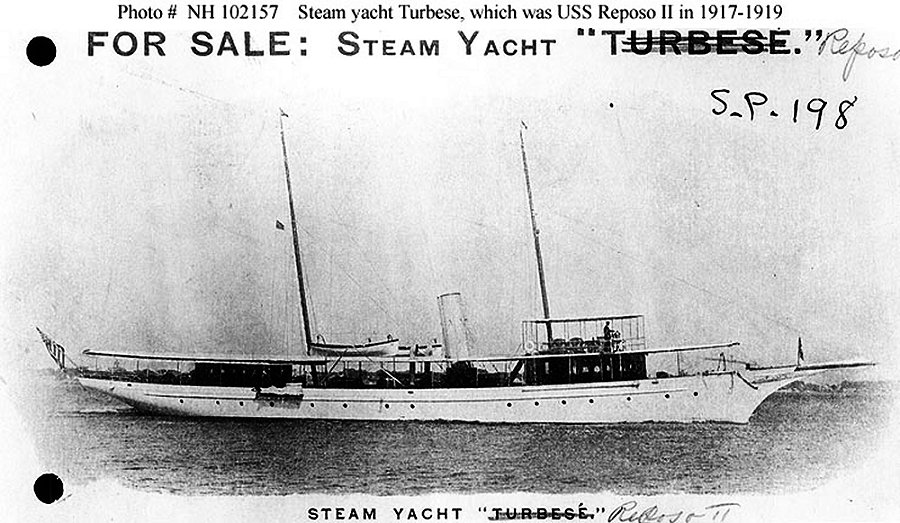
- The yacht Turbese prior to World War I. She later became USS Reposo II.

History

United States
- Name: USS Reposo II
- Namesake: Previous name retained
- Completed: 1882
- Refit: Rebuilt and enlarged in 1902 by Greenpoint Construction Company, Greenpoint, New York
- Acquired: 7 April 1917
- Commissioned: ca. 21 May 1917
- Decommissioned: 24 December 1918
- Fate: Sold 8 August 1919
- Notes: Operated as civilian yacht Sophia and Empress 1882-1902 and Onondaga, Turbese, and Reposo II 1902-1917

General characteristics
- Type: Patrol vessel
- Tonnage: 157 tons
- Length: 140 ft (43 m)
- Beam: 7 ft 1 in (2.16 m)
- Draft: 8 ft (2.4 m)
- Depth of hold: 9 ft 6 in (2.90 m)
- Propulsion: Steam engine
- Speed: 14 knots
- Complement: 18
- Armament: 1 × 3-pounder gun; 2 × machine guns

USS Reposo II (SP-198) was a United States Navy patrol vessel in commission from 1917 to 1918.

Reposo II was built as the civilian steam yacht Sophia in 1882. She later was renamed Empress. In 1902 she was rebuilt and enlarged by the Greenpoint Construction Company at Greenpoint on Long Island, New York, and renamed Onondaga. She later was renamed Turbese and then Reposo II.

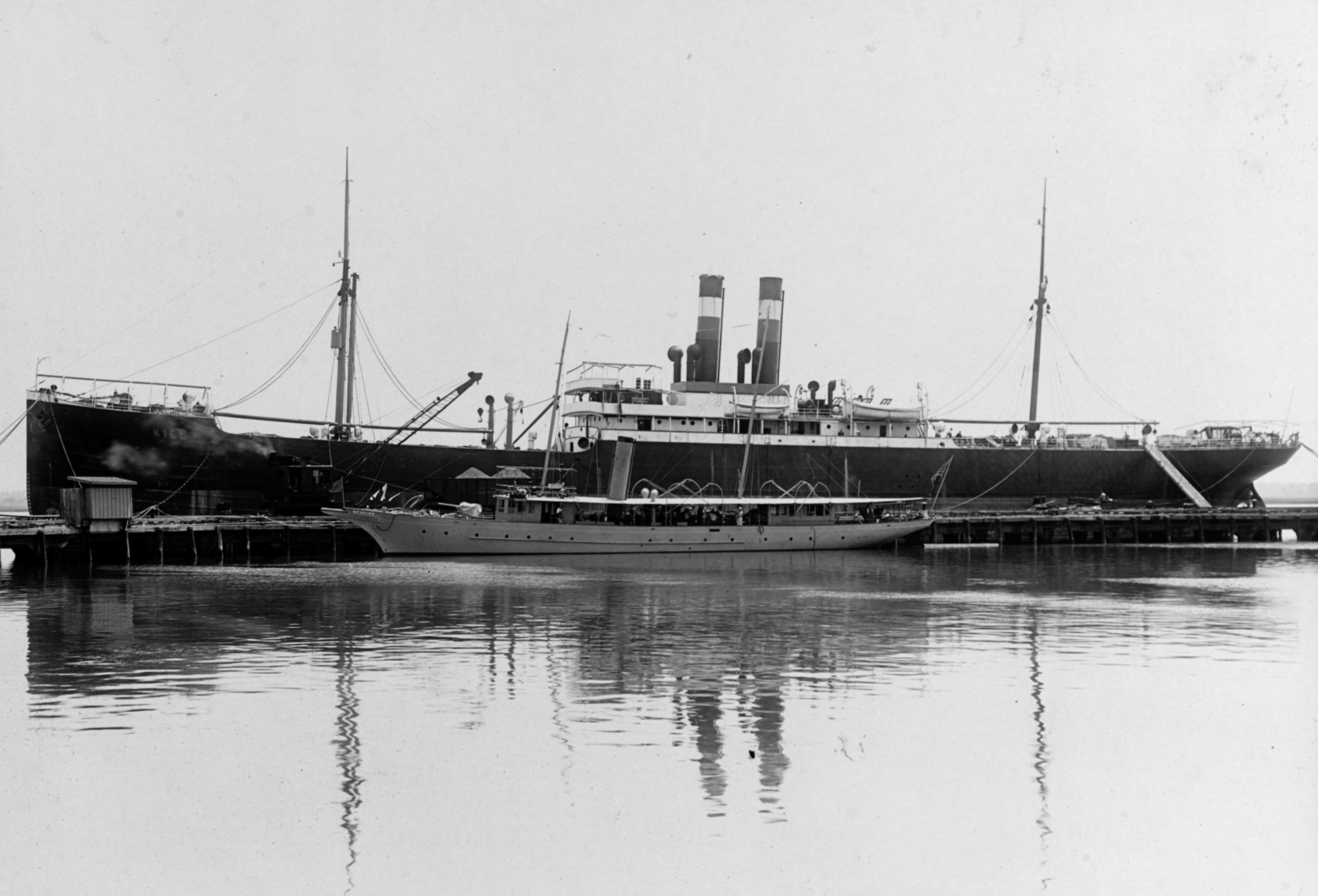
USS Reposo II at the Charleston Navy Yard at Charleston, South Carolina, on 11 June 1917 with the much larger cargo ship USS Camden (ID-3143) undergoing conversion behind her.

The U.S. Navy acquired Reposo II on 7 April 1917 for World War I service as a patrol vessel. She was commissioned as USS Reposo II (SP-198) sometime around 21 May 1917.

Reposo II patrolled the coastline between Key West, Florida, and Brunswick, Georgia, until May 1918.

From May to December 1918, Reposo II remained at anchor at the Charleston Navy Yard in Charleston, South Carolina. She was decommissioned there on 24 December 1918 and was sold on 8 August 1919 to John Pelly of Brooklyn, New York.
