= USS Raymond =

USS Raymond is a name used more than once by the United States Navy:

- USS Raymond (SP-2057) delivered 21 December 1917 to the Commandant, 2nd Naval District.
- USS Raymond (DE-341) laid down by Consolidated Steel Corp., Orange, Texas, 3 November 1943.
