= USS Ranger (Ontario) =

14-gun brigantine

History

United States
- Name: USS Ranger
- Namesake: A wanderer, or military scout
- Acquired: 1814
- Fate: Sold 15 May 1821

General characteristics
- Type: Brigantine
- Armament: 14 guns

USS Ranger was a 14-gun brigantine that served in the U.S. Navy from 1814 to 1821.

Ranger, likely either a former privateer or converted merchant vessel, was purchased on Lake Ontario in 1814. She was assigned to Commodore Isaac Chauncey's squadron in the War of 1812 as a tender and troop transport. She was condemned as being unfit for repairs or further service and was sold off on 15 May 1821; her fate afterwards is unknown.
