= USS Quicksilver =

Patrol vessel of the United States Navy

History

United States
- Name: USS Quicksilver
- Namesake: Previous name retained
- Builder: Jahncke Navigation Company, New Orleans, Louisiana
- Acquired: 24 May 1917
- Decommissioned: 28 January 1919
- Stricken: 17 May 1919
- Fate: Sold 30 June 1919

General characteristics
- Type: Patrol vessel
- Length: 50 ft 8 in (15.44 m)
- Beam: 10 ft (3.0 m)
- Draft: 1 ft 7 in (0.48 m)
- Speed: 22 knots
- Armament: 2 × 1-pounder guns

USS Quicksilver (SP–281) was a United States Navy patrol vessel in commission from 1917 to 1919.

Quicksilver was built by the Jahncke Navigation Company at New Orleans, Louisiana. The U.S. Navy acquired her under charter from her owner, Ernest Lee Jahncke, for World War I service as a patrol vessel. Jahncke delivered her to the Navy on 24 May 1917, and she was commissioned as USS Quicksilver (SP-281).

Quicksilver operated out of New Orleans on section patrol until late in World War I. On 1 October 1918 she was ordered to Naval Air Station Pensacola at Pensacola, Florida, where she was sorely needed in connection with training flights over Florida Bay. She continued in this duty until 27 November 1918, when she returned to New Orleans.

Quicksilver was decommissioned at New Orleans on 28 January 1919. She was stricken from the Naval Vessel Register on 17 May 1919, and was sold on 30 June 1919 to George Plant of Washington, D.C.
