= USS Rail =

USS Rail may refer to the following ships of the United States Navy:

- USS Rail (AM-26), a single-screw, steel Lapwing-class minesweeper laid down on 15 December 1917 by the Puget Sound Navy Yard, Bremerton, Washington
- USS Rail (AMCU-37), laid down as LCI(L)-1022 by the Albina Engine & Machinery Works, Portland, Oregon, on 3 March 1944.
