= USS Relief (YP-2) =

Tender of the United States Navy

- USS Relief (YP-2), possibly during her 1917–1921 U.S. Navy service

History

United States
- Name: USS Relief
- Namesake: Aid given in time of need
- Completed: 1910
- Acquired: 13 June 1917
- Fate: Sold 4 June 1921
- Notes: Privately operated 1910–1917; in commercial use 1921–1946, then became yacht

General characteristics
- Type: Lookout station tender
- Tonnage: 10
- Length: 35 ft (11 m) (reg)
- Beam: 9 ft 9 in (2.97 m)
- Speed: 10 knots
- Capacity: 6 passengers and crew
- Armament: none

The third USS Relief (YP-2) was a lookout station tender that served in the United States Navy from 1917 to 1921.

Relief was a wooden private motorboat built during 1910 at Yarmouth, Maine. Ensign Walter G. Richardson purchased her for the U.S. Navy for World War I service on 13 June 1917 with funds furnished by the Bar Harbor War Relief Committee of Bar Harbor, Maine, for use as a tender to the lookout station at Crumple Island, Maine. In 1920 she was designated YP-2.

Relief was sold on 4 June 1921 to Gus Potter of Yonkers, New York, remaining on mercantile registers until 1946 when she was transferred to exempt status as a yacht.
