= USS Rose Mary =

Patrol vessel of the United States Navy

History

United States
- Name: USS Rose Mary
- Namesake: Previous name retained
- Builder: Great Lakes Boat Building Company, Milwaukee, Wisconsin
- Yard number: 24
- Launched: January 16, 1917
- Completed: 1917
- Acquired: 8 September 1917
- Commissioned: 1917
- Fate: Returned to owner 15 November 1918
- Notes: Operated as private motorboat Rose Mary 1917 and from 1918

General characteristics
- Type: Patrol vessel
- Tonnage: 35 Gross register tons
- Length: 60 ft (18 m)
- Beam: 12 ft (3.7 m)
- Draft: 3 ft 6 in (1.07 m)
- Speed: 22 knots
- Armament: 1 × 1-pounder gun

USS Rose Mary (SP-1216) was a United States Navy patrol vessel in commission from 1917 to 1918.

Rose Mary was built in 1917 as a private motorboat of the same name by the Great Lakes Boat Building Company at Milwaukee, Wisconsin. On 8 September 1917, the U.S. Navy acquired her from her owner, Robert E. Hackett of Milwaukee, for use as a section patrol vessel during World War I. She was commissioned as USS Rose Mary (SP-1216).

Rose Mary served on patrol duties on the Great Lakes through the end of World War I. The Navy returned her to Hackett on 15 November 1918.
