= USS Qui Vive =

United States Navy patrol vessel

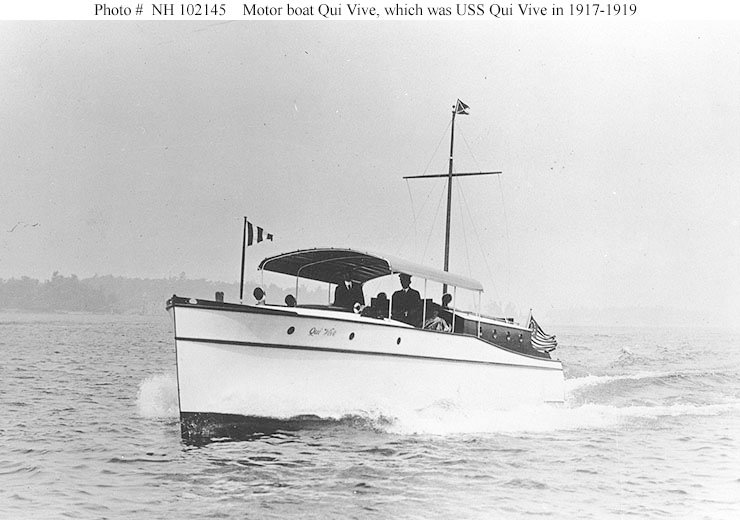
- Qui Vive as a private motorboat sometime in 1916 or the first half of 1917.

History

United States
- Name: USS Qui Vive
- Namesake: Previous name retained
- Builder: Hutchinson Brothers, Alexandria, New York
- Completed: 1916
- Acquired: 22 June 1917
- Commissioned: 1917
- Decommissioned: 6 May 1919
- Fate: Returned to owner 27 May or 7 June 1919
- Notes: Operated as private motorboat Qui Vive 1916-1917 and from 1919

General characteristics
- Type: Patrol vessel and hospital boat
- Length: 45 ft (14 m)
- Beam: 9 ft 6 in (2.90 m)
- Draft: 1 ft 7 in (0.5 m)
- Speed: 20 knots
- Complement: 5

USS Qui Vive (SP-1004) was a United States Navy patrol vessel in commission from 1917 to 1919. She served as a hospital boat for part of her naval career.

Qui Vive was built in 1916 by Hutchinson Brothers at Alexandria, New York, for Houston Barnard of Rochester, New York. On 22 June 1917, the U.S. Navy chartered her from Barnard at Alexandria Bay, New York, for use as a section patrol boat during World War I, and she was commissioned as USS Qui Vive (SP-1004) in 1917.

Assigned to the 5th Naval District, Qui Vive served on patrol duties until late in 1917. On 3 December 1917, she was reassigned to duty as a hospital boat at Norfolk, Virginia.

Qui Vive was decommissioned at Norfolk on 6 May 1919 and was returned to Barnard on 27 May or 7 June 1919.
