= USS Reaper =

USS Reaper is a name used more than once by the United States Navy:

- USS Reaper (AMc-96), a coastal minesweeper placed in service on 14 November 1942.
- USS Reaper (MSO-467), a fleet minesweeper commissioned 10 November 1954.
