= USS Ranger (1814) =

Armed schooner

History

United States
- Name: USS Ranger
- Namesake: A wanderer, or military scout
- Acquired: March 1814
- Fate: Sold in 1816

General characteristics
- Type: Schooner
- Sail plan: schooner-rigged
- Armament: 1 × 18-pounder gun

USS Ranger was an armed schooner that served in the U.S. Navy from 1814 to 1816.

Ranger, probably a former privateer, was purchased in Baltimore, Maryland, in March 1814. With the War of 1812 in its final years, she primarily served as a lookout and coastal guard vessel on the Chesapeake Bay. She was sold off in 1816; her fate afterwards is unknown.
