= USS Ray =

Two submarines of the United States Navy have borne the name USS Ray, named in honor of the ray, a fish characterized by a flat body, large pectoral fins, and a whiplike tail.

- USS Ray (SS-271) was a Gato-class submarine commissioned in 1943 and struck in 1960.
- USS Ray (SSN-653) was a Sturgeon-class submarine commissioned in 1967 and struck in 1993.
