= USS Richland =

USS Richland is a name used more than once by the U.S. Navy:

- USS Richland (AK-207), a cargo ship commissioned 22 April 1945 for service in World War II.
- USS Richland (YFD-64), a floating drydock commissioned as YFD-64 on 28 November 1944.
