= USS Rochester =

USS Rochester has been the name of many ships of the United States Navy. All of the ships are named for the city of Rochester, New York.

- USS New York (ACR-2), was renamed and redesignated to Rochester (CA-2).
- USS Saint Paul (CA-73), was originally laid down as Rochester, but was renamed prior to being launched.
- USS Rochester (CA-124), an Oregon City-class heavy cruiser
