= USS Randolph =

USS Randolph may refer to:

- USS Randolph (1776), a sailing frigate launched in 1776 and exploded in 1778 during an engagement with HMS Yarmouth
- USS Randolph (CV-15), an aircraft carrier that served from 1944 to 1969

See also

- MG Wallace F. Randolph, operated by the United States Army as a cable ship from 1942 to 1949
