= USS Rush (SP-712) =

Patrol vessel of the United States Navy

Coordinates: 39.88290°N 75.19287°W

History

United States
- Name: USS Rush
- Namesake: Previous name retained
- Builder: Baker's Yacht Basin, Quincy, Massachusetts
- Acquired: 1 May 1917
- Commissioned: 1917
- Fate: Wrecked 8 December 1917; Hulk sold 1921
- Notes: Operated as private motorboat Rush until 1917

General characteristics
- Type: Patrol vessel
- Length: 36 ft 6 in (11.13 m)
- Beam: 7 ft (2.1 m)
- Draft: 2 ft 6 in (0.76 m) forward
- Speed: 19 knots
- Complement: 3
- Armament: 1 × machine gun

The first USS Rush (SP-712) was a United States Navy patrol vessel in commission during 1917.

Rush was built as a private motorboat of the same name by Baker's Yacht Basin at Quincy, Massachusetts. On 1 May 1917, the U.S. Navy acquired her from her owner, N. H. White of Brookline, Massachusetts, for use as a section patrol boat during World War I. She was commissioned as USS Rush (SP-712) in 1917.

Rush was assigned to patrol duty in the 4th Naval District. On 8 December 1917, Rush was on a voyage from Boston, Massachusetts, to Philadelphia, Pennsylvania, when she struck a submerged log at the entrance to the back channel of League Island Navy Yard in Philadelphia and was wrecked. All hands were saved.

Much of Rush's equipment was salvaged, but she was finally declared a total loss on 12 December 1918. R. B. Scott of Philadelphia purchased her hulk in 1921, but she does not appear ever to have been seaworthy again.
