= USS Reprisal =

Two ships of the United States Navy have borne the name USS Reprisal, promising hostile action in response to an offense.

- USS Reprisal (1776) was a brig purchased by the American Continental Congress to serve in the American Revolutionary War.
- USS Reprisal (CV-30) was to be an Independence-class aircraft carrier, converted from the Cleveland-class light cruiser USS Newark. Reprisal was renamed USS San Jacinto after the loss of USS Houston.
- USS Reprisal (CV-35) was to be an Essex-class aircraft carrier, but construction was cancelled in August 1945.
