= USS Rappahannock =

USS Rappahannock may refer to the following ships of the United States Navy:

- USS Rappahannock (AF-6), was a stores ship and animal transport in commission from 1917 to 1924
- USS Rappahannock (AOG-2), was renamed Kern during construction in 1942
- USNS Rappahannock (T-AO-204), is a fleet replenishment oiler in Military Sealift Command service since 1995

== See also ==
- Rappahannock (disambiguation)#Ships
