= USS Rizzi =

John C. Butler-class destroyer escort of the United States Navy

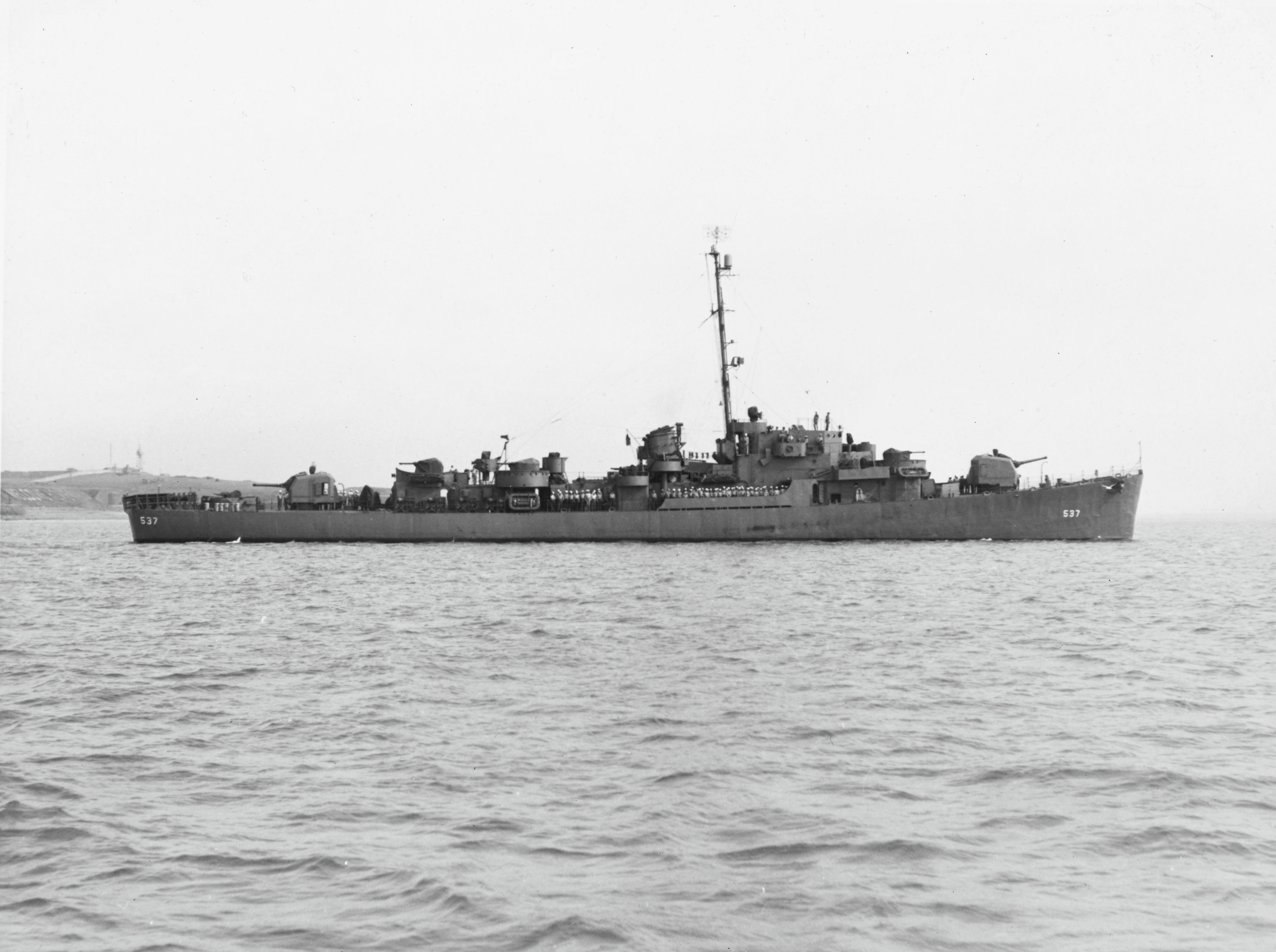

History

United States
- Laid down: 3 November 1943
- Launched: 7 December 1943
- Commissioned: 26 June 1945
- Decommissioned: 18 June 1946
- In service: NRT, 3rd Naval District, 28 March 1951
- Out of service: 28 February 1958
- Stricken: 1 August 1972
- Fate: Sold for scrapping 5 February 1974

General characteristics
- Displacement: 1,350 long tons (1,372 t)
- Length: 306 ft (93 m) (oa)
- Beam: 36 ft 10 in (11.23 m)
- Draft: 13 ft 4 in (4.06 m) (max)
- Propulsion: 2 boilers, 2 geared steam turbines, 12,000 shp, 2 screws
- Speed: 24 knots
- Range: 6,000 nm @ 12 knots
- Complement: 14 officers, 201 enlisted
- Armament: 2 × 5 in (130 mm) guns; 4 (2×2) 40 mm anti-aircraft (AA) guns; 10 × 20 mm AA guns; 3 × 21-inch (533 mm) torpedo tubes; 1 × Hedgehog; 8 × depth charge throwers; 2 × depth charge tracks

USS Rizzi (DE-537) was a John C. Butler-class destroyer escort in service with the United States Navy from 1945 to 1946 and from 1951 to 1958. She was sold for scrapping in 1974.

== History ==
Rizzi was named in honor of Rosalio Mario Rizzi who was posthumously awarded the Navy and Marine Corps Medal for his heroism during rescue operations for Wasp (CV-7) survivors. The ship was laid down on 3 November 1943 by the Boston Navy Yard, Boston, Massachusetts; launched on 7 December 1943; and christened by Mrs. Theresa Rizzi, mother of Seaman First Class Rizzi and commissioned on 26 June 1945 with LCdr. E. K. Winn assuming command.

=== World War II ===
Completing shakedown the day following the cessation of World War II hostilities, Rizzi departed Boston after availability and instead of heading for the Pacific Ocean, steamed to Norfolk, Virginia, for duty as training ship for student officers of the Destroyer School. Transferred in mid-November, she headed back to New England waters only to receive orders directing her to prepare for inactivation. A visit to New York City followed and with the new year, 1946, she sailed south to Green Cove Springs, Florida, and on 23 January reported to Commander, 16th (inactive) Fleet.

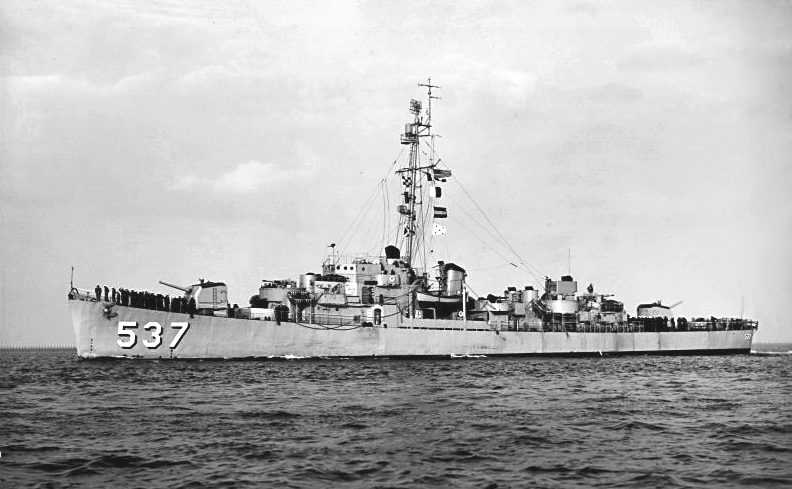
Rizzi in 1954.

=== Naval Reserve training ship ===
Decommissioned on 18 June 1946, Rizzi remained at Green Cove Springs in the Atlantic Reserve Fleet until ordered activated and assigned to the 3rd Naval District as a reserve training ship in January 1951. Recommissioned on 28 March 1951, she proceeded to New York whence she conducted training cruises-weekend and 2-week cruises along the U.S. East Coast and in the Caribbean, and summer cruises to Europe in 1953 and 1955 and to South America in 1954 for reservists in the New York City area.

=== Decommissioning and fate ===
In November 1957, Rizzi again prepared for inactivation. Decommissioned 28 February 1958, she remained in the Atlantic Reserve Fleet, berthed at Philadelphia, Pennsylvania, until the spring of 1972. At that time, she was surveyed and found to be unfit for further service. Consequently, Rizzi was stricken from the Navy list 1 August 1972. She was sold for scrapping on 5 February 1974.
