= USS Robert H. McCurdy =

Patrol vessel of the United States Navy

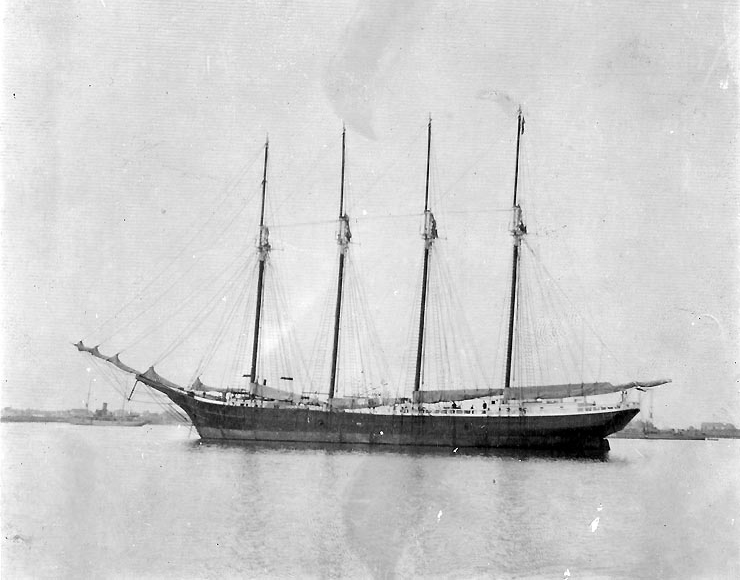
- USS Robert H. McCurdy (SP-3157) in harbor in 1918.

History

United States
- Name: USS Robert H. McCurdy
- Namesake: Previous name retained
- Builder: Cobb, Butler & Company, Rockland, Maine
- Completed: 1903
- Acquired: 25 July 1918
- Commissioned: 25 July 1918
- Decommissioned: early February 1919
- Fate: Sold June 1919
- Notes: Operated as civilian schooner Robert H. McCurdy 1903-1918

General characteristics
- Type: Patrol vessel
- Tonnage: 735 Gross register tons
- Length: 178 ft (54 m)
- Beam: 37 ft 2 in (11.33 m)
- Draft: 12 ft 1 in (3.68 m)
- Complement: 32

USS Robert H. McCurdy (SP-3096 or ID-3157) was a United States Navy patrol vessel in commission from 1918 to 1919.

== Construction, acquisition, and commissioning ==
Robert H. McCurdy was built as a civilian wooden four-masted schooner of the same name in 1903 by Cobb, Butler & Company at Rockland, Maine. In 1918, the U.S. Navy purchased her from W. S. Job & Company for use as a section patrol boat during World War I. The Navy took control of her on 25 July 1918 at Norfolk, Virginia, and commissioned her the same day at as USS Robert H. McCurdy (SP-3096 or ID-3096).

== Operational history ==
Robert H. McCurdy remained in the Norfolk area until mid-August 1918, when she moved to Lewes, Delaware, joining the submarine tender USS Savannah (Submarine Tender No. 8) there as a unit of Division 8 of the United States Atlantic Fleet submarine force. She operated from Lewes as a decoy ship teamed with a U.S. Navy submarine following her during antisubmarine patrols off the United States East Coast. It was hoped that her innocent appearance would lure unsuspecting German submarines to the surface to attack her with gunfire, allowing the submerged U.S. Navy submarine nearby to torpedo and sink them. However, Robert H. McCurdy never encountered a German submarine.

In late October 1918, Robert H. McCurdy was rebased at Cold Spring Inlet at Cape May, New Jersey. On 29 November 1918 she moved to Atlantic City, New Jersey, where she assisted in minesweeping work until 8 December 1918. She then returned to Cold Spring Inlet.

== Disposal ==
Late in January 1919, Robert H. McCurdy was towed to Philadelphia, Pennsylvania, where she arrived on 29 January 1919 for inactivation. She was both decommissioned there in February 1919 and subsequently stricken from the Navy List. She was sold in June 1919.

== Bibliography ==
- Beyer, Edward F. & Beyer, Kenneth M. (1991). "U. S. Navy Mystery Ships". Warship International. XXVIII (4). International Naval Research Organization: 322–372. ISSN 0043-0374.
