= USS Reno =

Two ships of the United States Navy have been named USS Reno, the first after Walter E. Reno, and the second after the city of Reno, Nevada.

- The first USS Reno (DD-303) was a destroyer in service from 1920 to 1930.
- The second USS Reno (CL-96) was a light cruiser in service from 1943 to 1946.

== See also ==
- Reno (disambiguation)
