= USS Relief (1904) =

Lightship, in Navy service 1918–1919

History

United States
- Name: USS Relief
- Completed: 1904
- Acquired: 29 August 1918
- Fate: Returned to United States Lighthouse Service 30 August 1919
- Notes: Operated by United States Lighthouse Service 1904-1918 and beginning in 1919

General characteristics
- Type: Lightship
- Displacement: 578 tons
- Length: 117 ft 7 in (35.84 m)
- Beam: 28 ft 8 in (8.74 m)
- Depth of hold: 12 ft (3.7 m)
- Speed: 10 knots
- Complement: 7 (original)
- Armament: none

The fifth USS Relief was a lightship that served in the United States Navy from 1918 to 1919.

Relief was built in 1904 as a light vessel for the United States Lighthouse Service, a part of the United States Department of the Treasury. She was employed as one of ten reserve vessels designated "relief", assuming the name of the station lightship she replaced when on station.

This vessel was acquired by the U.S. Navy on 29 August 1918 for World War I service and assigned to the 6th Naval District for service as a lightship.

She was returned to the U.S. Lighthouse Service on 30 August 1919, remaining on its registers through the 1920s.

The ship was featured by Huell Howser in California's Gold Episode 210.
