= USS Redfish =

USS Redfish has been the name of more than one United States Navy ship, and may refer to:

- USS Redfish (SS-395), later AGSS-395, a submarine in commission from 1944 to 1968
- USS Redfish (SSN-680), the original name planned for an attack submarine renamed USS William H. Bates (SSN-680) in 1969 prior to the beginning of construction
