= USS Riverside =

USS Riverside may refer to the following ships of the United States Navy:

- USS Riverside (1890), a wooden, schooner-rigged barge, was built during 1890 at Brooklyn, New York.
- USS Riverside (APA-102), a Bayfield-class attack transport which saw service during World War II
