= USS Regis II =

Patrol vessel of the United States Navy

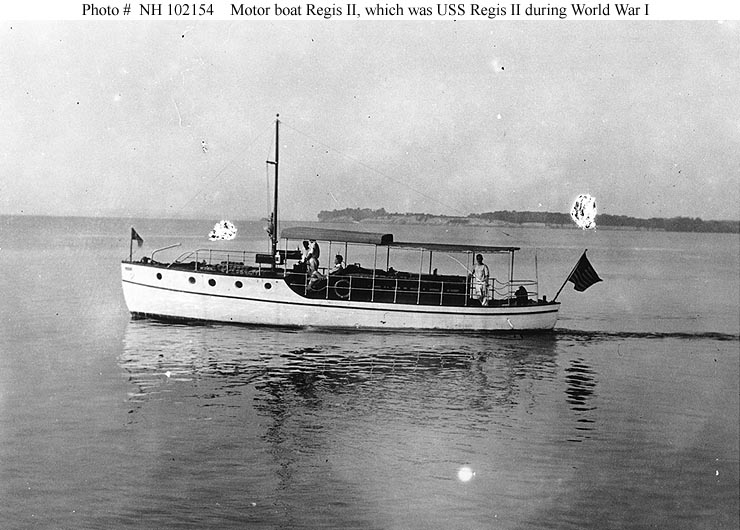
- Regis II as a private motorboat sometime between 1902 and 1917.

History

United States
- Name: USS Regis II
- Namesake: Previous name retained
- Builder: Simon Martin
- Completed: 1902
- Acquired: 16 July 1917
- Commissioned: 17 July 1917
- Fate: Returned to owner 25 January 1919
- Notes: Operated as private motor yacht or motorboat Regis II 1902-1917 and from 1919

General characteristics
- Type: Patrol vessel
- Length: 45 ft (14 m)
- Beam: 9 ft 6 in (2.90 m)
- Draft: 3 ft (0.91 m) mean
- Speed: 8 knots
- Armament: 1 × machine gun

USS Regis II (SP-1083) was a United States Navy patrol vessel in commission from 1917 to 1919.

Regis II was built as a private motor yacht or motorboat of the same name in 1902 for J. E. Kerr of Baltimore, Maryland, by Simon Martin. In 1917, her owner loaned her to the U.S. Navy for use as a section patrol boat during World War I. The Navy took delivery of her in the 5th Naval District on 16 July 1917, and she was commissioned on 17 July 1917 as USS Regis II (SP-1083).

Assigned to the 5th Naval District, Regis II served on patrol duty in the harbor at Norfolk, Virginia, in Hampton Roads, and in the lower Chesapeake Bay through the end of World War I.

The Navy returned Regis II to her owner on 25 January 1919.
