= USS Robinson =

USS Robinson may refer to more than one United States Navy ship:

- USS Robinson (DD-88), a destroyer in commission from 1918 to 1922
- USS Robinson (DD-562), a destroyer in commission from 1944 to 1964
- USS Jack C. Robinson (DE-671), a destroyer escort converted during construction into the high-speed transport USS Jack C. Robinson (APD-72)
- USS Jack C. Robinson (APD-72), a high-speed transport in commission from 1945 to 1946
