= USNS Richard G. Matthiesen =

Former United States naval vessel

History

United States
- Namesake: Richard G. Matthiesen
- Owner: Maritime Administration
- Operator: Military Sealift Command
- Builder: American Ship Building Company, Tampa, Florida
- Acquired: February 18 1986
- In service: February 18 1986
- Out of service: March 31 2011
- Stricken: March 31 2011
- Identification: IMO number: 8310102; MMSI number: 368719000; Callsign: NBBP
- Honors and awards: National Defense Service Medal; Southwest Asia Service Medal; Kuwait Liberation Medal
- Fate: Transferred to the Maritime Administration

General characteristics
- Type: Type 5 Oil tanker
- Tonnage: 21,471 tons GT; 33,095 DWT
- Length: 617 ft 2 in (188 m)
- Beam: 91 ft 6 in (28 m)
- Draft: 28 ft 4 in (9 m)
- Propulsion: 1 Sulzer 5RTA 76 diesel; 18,400 hp sustained; 1 shaft
- Speed: 33 knots (61 km/h; 38 mph)
- Capacity: 237,766 barrels of oil fuel
- Complement: 24 civilians, 18 civilians (reduced operating status)
- Armament: None
- Aviation facilities: Landing pad

USNS Richard G. Matthiesen (T-AOT-1124) was one of four tankers, known as T5s, with double hulls ice-strengthened for protection against damage during missions in extreme climates. She was part of Military Sealift Command's Sealift Program, transporting fuel for the Department of Defense. Richard G. Matthiesen had missions including refueling the National Science Foundation in Antarctica and Thule Air Base in Greenland. She was named after Richard G Matthiesen, a Merchant Marine Distinguished Service Medal recipient.

Richard G. Matthiesen went out of service on March 31 2011 and transferred to the Maritime Commission for disposal.
