= USS Raritan =

At least three United States Navy ships have been named USS Raritan, after the Raritan River in New Jersey.

- USS Raritan (1843) was a sailing frigate launched in 1843
- USCGC Raritan (WYT-93) was a harbor tug, commissioned into the United States Coast Guard in 1939, transferred to the Navy in 1941, transferred back to the Coast Guard in 1946, and decommissioned in 1988
- USS Raritan (LSM-540) was a landing ship commissioned in 1945 and decommissioned in 1959
