= USS Beaufort (AK-6) =

German cargo ship captured by United States

History

German Empire
- Name: Rheingraf
- Operator: Leonhardt and Blumberg
- Builder: Schiffswerft von Henry Koch AG, Lübeck, German Empire
- Launched: 24 February 1909
- Renamed: Rudolph Blumberg
- Fate: Seized at Pensacola, Florida, and acquired by the Navy in April 1917
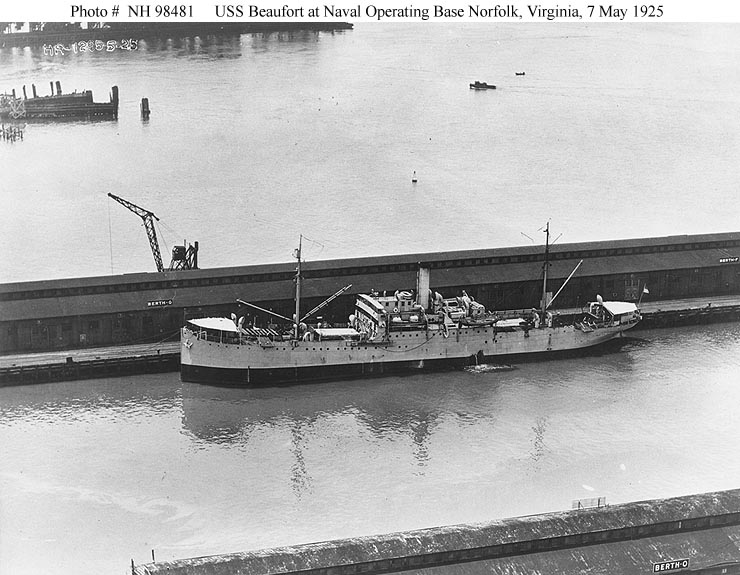
- USS Beaufort (AK-6) Tied up at Berth G, Naval Operating Base Norfolk, Virginia, on 7 May 1925.

United States
- Name: Beaufort
- Namesake: Beaufort, South Carolina
- Acquired: April 1917
- Commissioned: 20 September 1917, USS Beaufort (ID 3008)
- Decommissioned: 23 December 1925
- Reclassified: 17 July 1920, USS Beaufort (AK-6)
- Stricken: 23 December 1925
- Identification: Hull symbol:ID-3008; Hull symbol:AK-6
- Fate: Sold 22 October 1926, to a Norwegian Shipping Co., renamed SS Fjorden, foundered 12 April 1933

General characteristics
- Type: Collier
- Displacement: 1,769 long tons (1,797 t) (lt), 4,565 long tons (4,638 t) (fl)
- Length: 288 ft 10 in (88.04 m)
- Beam: 40 ft (12 m)
- Draft: 18 ft 4 in (5.59 m)
- Propulsion: system unknown
- Speed: 8 kn (9.2 mph; 15 km/h)
- Complement: 92
- Armament: four 3" guns

USS Beaufort (AK-6) was a cargo ship acquired by the U.S. Navy for service in World War I.

== Seizing a German freighter ==
The German steel-hulled collier SS Rudolph Blumberg (ex-SS Rheingraf) built in 1909 at Lübeck, Germany, was operating in the Gulf of Mexico, flying the house flag of Leonhardt and Blumberg, when she learned of the outbreak of hostilities in July 1914. She sought refuge at Pensacola, Florida.

With American entry into the global conflict and the accompanying need for auxiliary ships, SS Rudolph Blumberg was seized there by the U.S. Collector of the Port of Pensacola on 6 April 1917. Taken to New Orleans, Louisiana, to be fitted out for naval service, the ship was renamed Beaufort, given the identification number (Id. No.) 3008, and commissioned on 20 September 1917.

== World War I North Atlantic operations ==
Assigned to the Naval Overseas Transportation Service, Beaufort resumed the occupation she had carried on under a different flag; she took on a cargo of coal at Hampton Roads, Virginia, and departed Staten Island, New York, on 25 October 1917 in a convoy bound for France. Upon reaching Europe, Beaufort joined the Cross Channel Service, Coal Trade, and carried her cargoes from Cardiff, Wales, to aid the Allied war effort.

== Grounded off the coast of France ==
While thus employed, Beaufort grounded 17 March 1918 on a rocky reef off Lorient, France. Fortunately, little hull damage resulted; and, two days later, the collier was again ready for sea.

== Post-war activity ==
Sailing from Cardiff on 6 February 1919, Beaufort loaded war material and munitions at Rosyth, Scotland, for return to the United States. She arrived at Hampton Roads on 3 April 1919, and began a tour of duty with the Atlantic Fleet Train, a predecessor of the Service Force. On 17 July 1920 when the Navy adopted the alphanumeric system of ship classification and identification, she was classified as a cargo ship and designated AK-6.

Beaufort's peacetime service included voyages between Norfolk, Virginia, and Key West, Florida, and ports in the West Indies transporting coal and supplies. On several occasions she sailed from the naval ammunition depot at St. Julien's Creek, Virginia, with discarded ammunition for dumping in the mid-Atlantic.

== Inactivation and decommissioning ==
The withdrawal of U.S. Marines from Santo Domingo and a reduction in the number of marines in Haiti "considerably reduced" the "transportation requirements" to West Indian ports, so the Navy withdrew the ship from that service, and decommissioned her on 23 December 1925 at the Norfolk Navy Yard. Her name was struck from the Navy List the same day. The former Beaufort was sold on 22 October 1926 to Julius Levey of New York City, agent for a Norwegian Shipping Co., and was renamed SS Fjorden. She was reportedly lost, 12 April 1933 off Cheung Chau, Hong Kong.

== Military awards and honors ==
Beaufort's crew member were authorized the following medals:

- World War I Victory Medal (with Transport clasp)
- Haitian Campaign Medal
