= USS Rehoboth =

USS Rehoboth has been the name of more than one United States Navy ship, and may refer to:

- USS Rehoboth (SP-384), a patrol vessel in commission in 1917
- USS Rehoboth (AVP-50), which was in commission as a seaplane tender (AVP-50) from 1944 to 1947 and as an oceanographic survey ship from 1948—redesignated AGS-50 in 1949—to 1970
