= USS Regulus =

USS Regulus is a name used more than once by the United States Navy:

- USS Regulus (AK-14), commissioned in ordinary 8 August 1940
- USS Regulus (AF-57), launched 7 June 1944
