= USS Romain =

History

United States
- Name: Romain
- Namesake: A cape on the coast of South Carolina.
- Builder: Symonette Ship Building Co.
- Acquired: 18 August 1942
- In service: 25 November 1942
- Out of service: 17 March 1943
- Stricken: 28 June 1944
- Home port: Port Everglades, Florida
- Fate: Transferred to the Maritime Commission for disposal by sale 3 January 1945.
- Notes: Ship International Radio Callsign: NZHS

General characteristics
- Length: 84 feet
- Beam: 20 feet, 9 inches
- Draft: 9 feet
- Propulsion: 1 gas engine
- Complement: 10

USS Romain was a Auxiliary Wooden Schooner in service with the United States Navy briefly during World War II. Built in 1937 as Mérida by Symonette Ship Building Co., she was acquired by the U.S. Navy on 18 August 1942. She was put into service as USS Romain (IX-89) on 25 November 1942. Only in naval service for a brief 4-months, she spent them in the 7th Naval District, operating out of Port Everglades, Florida, sailing on patrol along the Florida coast and in the Bahama Islands.

She was placed out of naval service on 17 March 1943, and struck from the Naval Register on 28 June 1944. She was then transferred to the Maritime Commission for disposal by sale on 3 January 1945 and resold to her original owner, Robert C. Rathbone. She then became Debotha 5th, then after, Salt Air II in 1947. She was taken out of documentation in 1950. Her fate is unknown.

== Ship Awards ==
- American Campaign Medal
- World War II Victory Medal
