= USS Queenfish =

Two submarines of the United States Navy have borne the name USS Queenfish, named in honor of the queenfish, a small food fish found off the Pacific coast of North America.

- USS Queenfish (SS-393) was a Balao-class submarine commissioned in 1944 and struck in 1963.
- USS Queenfish (SSN-651), was a Sturgeon-class submarine, commissioned in 1966 and struck in 1992.
