= USS Royone =

History

United States
- Name: USS Royone
- Launched: 1936
- Acquired: by donation, 20 December 1949
- Commissioned: April 1950
- Decommissioned: 26 June 1967
- Stricken: 1 July 1967
- Home port: Annapolis, Maryland
- Fate: Sold, 1 July 1967

General characteristics
- Type: Yacht
- Displacement: 30 long tons (30 t)

USS Royone (IX-235) was a training ship in the United States Navy.

A former oil screw yacht, Royone was built in Bristol, Rhode Island, in 1936; donated to the United States Naval Academy on 20 December 1949; accepted by the Navy on 2 March 1950, commissioned in April 1950; and used for instruction and recreation of the midshipmen.

On 26 June 1967 she was declared excess to the needs of the Navy, and on 1 July she was struck from the Navy Directory.
