= USS Richard Peck =

History

United States
- Name: USS Richard Peck
- Builder: Harlan and Hollingsworth, Wilmington, Delaware
- Launched: 1892
- Acquired: 20 February 1943
- Commissioned: 20 February 1943
- Decommissioned: 5 November 1943
- Stricken: 16 November 1943
- Home port: Argentia, Newfoundland
- Fate: Transferred to War Shipping Administration, 9 December 1943

General characteristics
- Tonnage: 2,906 long tons (2,953 t) (gross)
- Length: 316 ft (96 m)
- Beam: 62 ft (19 m)
- Draft: 12 ft 6 in (3.81 m)
- Speed: 22 knots (41 km/h; 25 mph)

USS Richard Peck (IX-96) was an auxiliary ship of the United States Navy during 1943. Built in 1892 by Harlan and Hollingsworth, Wilmington, Delaware, she was acquired by the Navy on 20 February 1943, from the New England Steamship Company, New Haven, Connecticut, and commissioned the same day at Argentia, Newfoundland.

Richard Peck provided electrical power at Argentia during her active service. Decommissioned on 5 November 1943, at Norfolk, Virginia, she was struck from the Navy List on 16 November 1943, transferred to the War Shipping Administration on 9 December 1943, and subsequently transferred to the Pennsylvania Railroad.
