= USS Rogers =

USS Rogers has been the name of more than one United States Navy ship, and may refer to:

- USS Rogers (DE-772), a destroyer escort laid down in 1943 and renamed USS Milton Lewis (DE-772) in 1944 prior to launching
- USS Rogers (DD-876), a destroyer in commission from 1945 to 1980
