= USS Ranger (SP-369) =

Minesweeper of the United States Navy

History

United States
- Name: USS Ranger
- Namesake: A wanderer, or military scout
- Builder: Robert Jacob, City Island, New York
- Completed: 1882; rebuilt 1915
- Acquired: 10 September 1918
- Commissioned: 11 September 1918
- Stricken: 10 January 1919
- Fate: Returned to owner 10 January 1919

General characteristics
- Type: Coastal minesweeper
- Displacement: 115 tons
- Length: 137 ft 5 in (41.88 m)
- Beam: 21 ft 2 in (6.45 m)
- Draft: 9 ft 6 in (2.90 m)
- Speed: 10 knots
- Complement: 24

The sixth USS Ranger (SP-369) was a coastal minesweeper that served in the U.S. Navy from 1918 to 1919.

Ranger (SP-369) was a wooden motorboat built by T. A. Scott Company, New London, Connecticut, in 1882 and rebuilt in 1915. She was acquired by the U.S. Navy on charter on 10 September 1918 and commissioned on 11 September 1918 at Charleston, South Carolina.

Used briefly as a coastal minesweeper in the 6th Naval District during World War I, Ranger was struck from the Navy List and returned to her owner on 10 January 1919.
