= USS Roller =

Minesweeper of the United States Navy

History

United States
- Laid down: 27 December 1940
- Launched: 14 May 1941
- In service: 12 August 1941
- Out of service: 18 April 1946
- Stricken: 1 May 1946
- Fate: fate unknown

General characteristics
- Displacement: 213 tons
- Length: 97 ft 1 in (29.59 m)
- Beam: 22 ft (6.7 m)
- Draught: 8 ft 6 in (2.59 m)
- Speed: 10.0 knots
- Complement: 7
- Armament: two .30 cal (7.62 mm) machine guns

USS Roller (AMc-52) was an Accentor-class coastal minesweeper acquired by the U.S. Navy for the dangerous task of removing mines from minefields laid in the water to prevent ships from passing.

Roller was laid down 27 December 1940 at the Snow Shipyards, Rockland, Maine; launched 14 May 1941; sponsored by Miss Linda Ann Dean; and placed in service 12 August 1941.

== World War II service ==
After fitting at Boston, Massachusetts, and training at Yorktown, Virginia, the wooden hulled coastal minesweeper Roller got underway for duty in the 4th Naval District, headquartered at Philadelphia, Pennsylvania, 18 September 1941.

Equipped with magnetic and "O" type sweep gear, she operated off the busy Delaware and New Jersey coasts during all but the final weeks of World War II.

Transferred in the spring of 1945, she departed Cape May, New Jersey, 25 April and steamed to Solomons Island, Maryland, where she conducted operations for the Naval Mine Warfare Test Station until placed out of service 18 April 1946.

== Post-war deactivation ==
Roller, struck from the Navy list 1 May 1946, was transferred to the Maritime Commission for disposal 27 May 1947 and subsequently sold to Hughes Bros., Inc., of New York City.
