= USS Rivalen =

Patrol vessel of the United States Navy

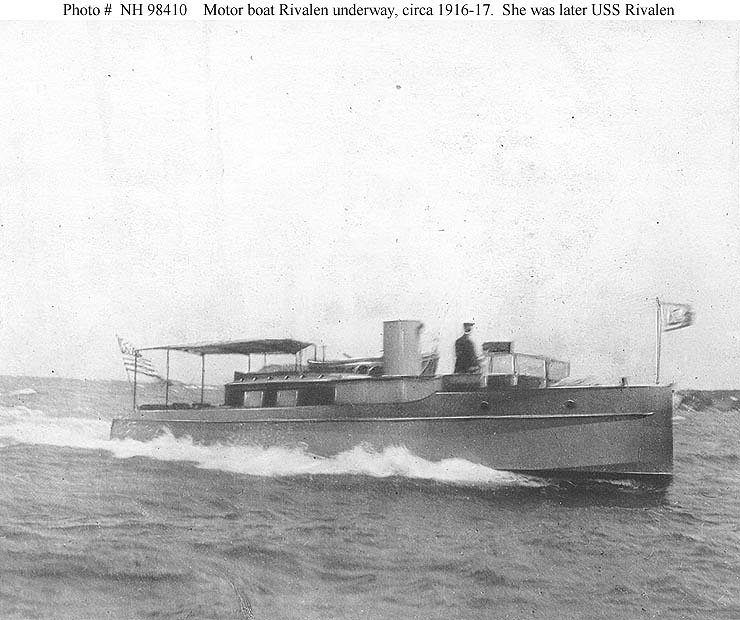
- Rivalen in private use in 1917, prior to her U.S. Navy service

History

United States
- Name: USS Rivalen
- Namesake: Previous name retained
- Builder: George Lawley & Son, Neponset, Massachusetts
- Completed: 1917
- Acquired: Leased 17 April 1917; Delivered 29 June 1917
- Commissioned: 12 May 1918
- Fate: Laid up July 1918; Returned to owner 5 May 1919
- Notes: In use as private motorboat Rivalen 1919-1921 and Tremont 1921-early 1930s

General characteristics
- Type: Patrol vessel
- Length: 43 ft (13 m)
- Beam: 9 ft (2.7 m)
- Draft: 2 ft 7 in (0.79 m)
- Speed: 19 knots
- Complement: 7
- Armament: 1 × 1-pounder gun

USS Rivalen (SP-63) was an armed motorboat that served in the United States Navy as a patrol vessel from 1917 to 1919.

Rivalen was built as a private wooden motorboat of the same name in 1917 by George Lawley & Son at Neponset, Massachusetts. The U.S. Navy acquired her for World War I service as a patrol vessel on a lease from her owner, W. Harry Brown of Pittsburgh, Pennsylvania, on 17 April 1917 and took delivery of her at the Boston Navy Yard at Boston, Massachusetts, on 29 June 1917. The Navy finally commissioned her as USS Rivalen (SP-63) on 12 May 1918.

Rivalen entered service as a patrol boat at Boston Harbor in May 1918, but the Navy soon found her unsuited for naval service and laid her up in July 1918. She then was inactive until returned to her owner on 5 May 1919.

Again in private use from 1919, Rivalen was sold to a new owner and renamed Tremont in 1921. She disappeared from yacht registers in the early 1930s.
