= USS Ripple =

USS Ripple has been the name of two United States Navy ships, it may refer to:

- USS Ripple, the name between 4 February 1916 and 10 April 1918 of a ferryboat built as USS Wave, renamed USS Faithful on 10 April 1918, and designated USS Faithful (YFB-5) on 17 July 1920 "Ripple I". DANFS.
- USS Ripple (ID-2439), a minesweeper in commission from 1918 to 1919
