= USS Rutoma =

Patrol vessel of the United States Navy

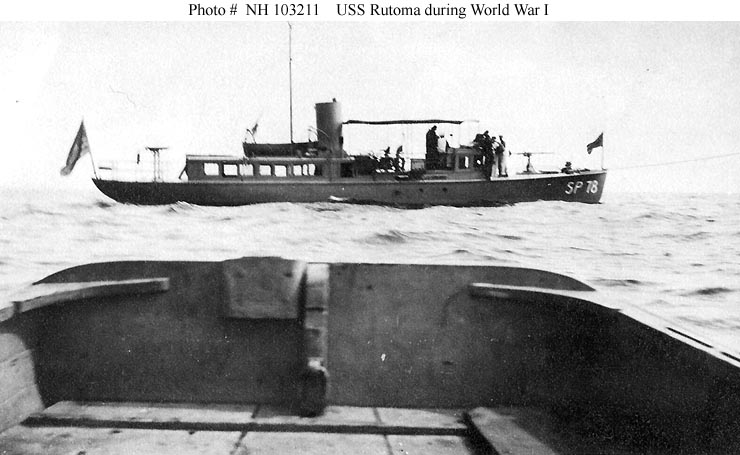
- USS Rutoma photographed over the stern of a small boat in 1917 or 1918

History

United States
- Name: USS Rutoma
- Namesake: Previous name retained
- Builder: Seabury Company, Morris Heights, New York
- Completed: 1910
- Acquired: 18 April 1917
- Commissioned: 26 April 1917
- Fate: Sunk in collision 21 February 1919; Raised 22 February 1919; Sold 16 September 1919
- Notes: Operated as private motorboat Manchonac and Rutoma 1910-1917, and as a private motorboat from 1919

General characteristics
- Type: Patrol vessel
- Displacement: 29 tons
- Length: 68 ft (21 m) or 78 ft (24 m)
- Beam: 12 ft (3.7 m)
- Draft: 3 ft 6 in (1.07 m)
- Depth of hold: 5 ft 9 in (1.75 m)
- Speed: 12 knots
- Complement: 9
- Armament: 1 × 1-pounder gun; 2 × machine guns

USS Rutoma (SP-78) was an armed motorboat that served in the United States Navy as a patrol vessel from 1917 to 1919.

Rutoma was built as the private motorboat Manchonac in 1910 by the Seabury Company at Morris Heights, New York. She had been renamed Rutoma by the time the U.S. Navy purchased her from her owner, Graham T. Thompson of New Haven, Connecticut, on 18 April 1917 for World War I service as a patrol boat. She was commissioned on 26 April 1917 as USS Rutoma(SP-78).

Rutoma patrolled in the 3rd Naval District during 1917 and 1918, operating in Long Island Sound and eastward to New Haven. Transferred to New York City at the end of the war, Rutoma was rammed and sunk on 21 February 1919 by the tug SS John L. Lewis in the East River off Pier No. 6 in New York City.

Rutoma was raised on 22 February 1919 by salvage crews from the salvage tug USS Resolute (SP-1309). She subsequently was sold on 16 September 1919 to Reinhard Hall of Brooklyn, New York, and returned to civilian use, remaining on mercantile registers into the 1930s.
