= USS Rockdale =

Cargo ship of the United States Navy

History

United States
- Name: Rockdale
- Namesake: Rockdale County, Georgia
- Ordered: as type (C1-M-AV1) hull, MC hull 2162
- Builder: Leathem D. Smith Shipbuilding Company, Sturgeon Bay, Wisconsin
- Yard number: 327
- Laid down: 15 January 1944
- Launched: 1 October 1944
- Sponsored by: Mrs. William R. Crawford
- Acquired: 5 June 1945
- Commissioned: 26 June 1945
- Decommissioned: 22 March 1946
- Stricken: 12 April 1946
- Identification: Hull symbol: AK-208; Code letters: NXNR
- Fate: Sold 11 February 1947, Herlof Andersens Rederi A/S

Norway
- Name: Apollo
- Owner: Herlof Andersens Rederi A/S
- Acquired: 11 February 1947
- Fate: Wrecked and scrapped, 1969

General characteristics
- Class & type: Alamosa-class cargo ship
- Type: C1-M-AV1
- Tonnage: 5,032 long tons deadweight (DWT)
- Displacement: 2,382 long tons (2,420 t) (standard); 7,450 long tons (7,570 t) (full load)
- Length: 388 ft 8 in (118.47 m)
- Beam: 50 ft (15 m)
- Draft: 21 ft 1 in (6.43 m)
- Installed power: 1 × Nordberg, TSM 6 diesel engine; 1,750 shp (1,300 kW)
- Propulsion: 1 × propeller
- Speed: 11.5 kn (21.3 km/h; 13.2 mph)
- Capacity: 3,945 t (3,883 long tons) DWT; 9,830 cu ft (278 m^{3}) (refrigerated); 227,730 cu ft (6,449 m^{3}) (non-refrigerated)
- Complement: 15 Officers; 70 Enlisted
- Armament: 1 × 3 in (76 mm)/50 caliber dual purpose gun (DP); 6 × 20 mm (0.8 in) Oerlikon anti-aircraft (AA) cannons

USS Rockdale (AK-208) was an Alamosa-class cargo ship that was constructed for the US Navy during the closing period of World War II. She served with distinction in the Pacific Ocean theatre of operations and returned home in 1946 to be placed into the "mothball" fleet and sold in 1947.

== Construction ==
Rockdale was laid down 15 January 1944, under US Maritime Commission (MARCOM) contract, MC hull 2162, by Leathem D. Smith Shipbuilding Company, Sturgeon Bay, Wisconsin; launched 1 October 1944; sponsored by Mrs. William R. Crawford; acquired by the Navy from MARCOM on loan-charter basis 5 June 1945; and commissioned at Galveston, Texas, 26 June 1945.

== Service history ==
=== World War II service ===
Following shakedown off Galveston, Texas, Rockdale got underway from Gulfport, Mississippi, for the Panama Canal. Transiting the Canal 27 July, she proceeded to Hollandia, New Guinea, where she arrived 2 September to unload her cargo. On 9 September she steamed for Australia, reaching Brisbane 17 September. She got underway for Manus Island 25 September arriving 3 October. Underway the next day, she made Saipan on the 10th.

Rockdale got underway on 13 October for Okinawa where she arrived 5 days later. On 1 November she sailed for the Mariana Islands and operated in that island group until getting underway for the Panama Canal on 13 January 1946. She transited the Canal on 20 February and arrived Norfolk, Virginia, on 1 March.

=== Post-war inactivation ===
Rockdale decommissioned there 22 March, was returned to the War Shipping Administration on the 26th for lay-up in the James River, and was struck from the Navy List 12 April 1946.

== Merchant service ==
Rockdale was sold, 11 February 1947, to Herlof Andersens A/S, of Norway, for $693,862.00. She was wrecked and scrapped in 1969.

== Notes ==
Citations

== Bibliography ==
Online resources

- "Rockdale (AK-208)". Dictionary of American Naval Fighting Ships. Naval History and Heritage Command. 19 October 2005. This article incorporates text from this source, which is in the public domain.
- "C1 Cargo Ships". www.ShipbuildingHistory.com. 28 August 2009.
- "Rockdale (AK-208)". NavSource. 23 May 2014.
- "Rockdale (AK-208)". United States Department of Transportation. Archived from the original on 29 June 2017.
