= USS Richard Vaux =

120-ton canal boat

USS Richard Vaux (1864), a 120-ton canal boat, was purchased by the Union Navy at Philadelphia, Pennsylvania, 16 July 1864, for use as part of the "stone fleet" of obstructions in the waterways of the Confederate States of America during the American Civil War.

Richard Vaux was laden with stone, and sent via Baltimore, Maryland, to the James River to be sunk on the bar at Trent's Reach, Virginia, to protect Union troops from Confederate attack by water.

== See also ==
- Union Blockade
