= USS Revenge =

Six ships in service to the United States have been named Revenge.

- USS Revenge (1776) was a schooner built in 1776 and served on Lake Champlain. She was either taken or burned in 1777.
- USS Revenge (1777) was a cutter in the Continental Navy. She was purchased in 1777, served until sold in 1779 and continued to harass British shipping as a privateer.
- USS Revenge (1806) was a schooner purchased in 1806 and served during the years preceding the War of 1812. She was wrecked in 1811 off the coast of Rhode Island.
- USS Revenge (1808) was a schooner built in 1808, as Gunboat No. 158. She was placed in service as Revenge in 1822 and served until 1824.
- USS Revenge (1812) was a schooner built in 1812 and purchased in 1813.
- USS Revenge (AM-110) was a World War II-era Auk-class minesweeper, commissioned in 1943 and decommissioned in 1965.
