= USS Ready =

USS Ready may refer to the following ships of the United States Navy:

- USS Ready (PG-67), a patrol gunboat in World War II
- USS Ready (PG-87), a patrol gunboat in the Vietnam War
