= USS Rigel =

USS Rigel is a name used more than once by the United States Navy:

- USS Rigel (AD-13), built in 1918 as Edgecombe by the Skinner and Eddy Corp., Seattle, Washington.
- USS Rigel (AF-58), laid down under a Maritime Administration contract on 15 March 1954 by the Ingalls Shipbuilding Corp., Pascagoula, Mississippi.
