= USS Rescue =

USS Rescue is a name used more than once by the U.S. Navy:

- USS Rescue (1850), was on loan to the U.S. Government by Henry Grinnell in 1850 for use in tracing the ill-fated May 1845 Arctic expedition.
- USS Rescue (1861), purchased for the Navy on 21 August 1861; fitted out at Philadelphia, Pennsylvania and ordered to join the Potomac Flotilla.
- USS Rescue (1899), a salvage tug commissioned 25 September 1918.
- USS Rescue (AH-18) was commissioned 17 May 1941 as USS Antaeus (AG-67).
