= Ransom B. Fuller =

Steamship

History

United States
- Name: Ransom B. Fuller
- Builder: New England Company
- Completed: 1902
- Fate: Scrapped ca 1935

General characteristics
- Displacement: 2329 tons
- Length: 317 ft 6 in (96.77 m)
- Beam: 40 ft 1 in (12.22 m)
- Draft: 14 ft (4.3 m)
- Propulsion: One 1,600hp steam engine with side-wheel paddle
- Speed: 5 kn (9.3 km/h; 5.8 mph)
- Complement: 90

SS Ransom B. Fuller was a steamship built in 1902 by the New England Company in Bath, Maine for the Eastern Steamship Corporation in New York, N.Y. The hull was lengthened in 1910 for operations between Portland, Maine and Boston, Massachusetts. She ran aground in the Kennebec River in 1912.

During World War I she was chartered by the United States Navy on 26 November 1917 to serve as a barracks ship at New London, Connecticut. USS Ransom B. Fuller served in that capacity until returned to the Eastern Steamship Company on 15 April 1918.

She was reportedly scrapped in 1935.
