= USS Redwing =

USS Redwing is a name the United States Navy has used more than once in naming its vessels:

- USS Redwing (AM-48), a minesweeper in naval service 1919–1924.
- USS Redwing (ARS-4), ex-USS Redwing (AM-48) in United States Coast Guard service 1924–1943.
- USS Redwing (AMS-200), a minesweeper in naval service 1955–1959.
- Redwing (YTB-783), a large harbor tugboat in naval service 1965–2003.

== See also ==
- USFS Red Wing, a United States Bureau of Fisheries fishery patrol vessel in commission from 1928 to 1939
