= USS Ramona =

United States Navy vessel

History

United States
- Laid down: 1920
- Acquired: 15 July 1942
- In service: 5 August 1942
- Out of service: 1 April 1943
- Stricken: 18 July 1944
- Fate: Returned to owner

General characteristics
- Displacement: 126 tons
- Length: 109 ft (33 m)
- Beam: 23 ft 6 in (7.16 m)
- Draught: 14 ft 4 in (4.37 m)

USS Ramona (IX-76), an unclassified miscellaneous vessel, was the only ship of the United States Navy to be named for a title character in a novel (Ramona by Helen Hunt Jackson). A steel-hulled schooner, her keel was laid down in 1920 by the Herreshoff Manufacturing Company, in Newport, Rhode Island. She was acquired by the Navy under bareboat charter from S. M. Spalding of Los Angeles, California, on 15 July 1942 and was placed in service 5 August 1942.

Originally assigned to the 11th Naval District, Ramona was transferred to the Western Sea Frontier on 31 August 1942. Homeported at San Diego, California, during her eight months in service, she patrolled off the California coast until placed out of service 1 April 1943. Her name was struck from the Naval Vessel Register on 18 July 1944 and she was returned to her owner on 5 August 1944.
