= USS Register =

USS Register has been the name of more than one United States Navy ship, and may refer to:

- USS Register (DE-308), a destroyer escort renamed USS Creamer on 10 September 1943 while under construction
- USS Register (DE-233), destroyer escort converted during construction into the high-speed transport USS Register (APD-92)
