= USS Russell =

Two ships of the United States Navy have borne the name USS Russell. The first was named in honor of Rear Admiral John Henry Russell and the second was named for Admiral Russell and his son, Commandant of the Marine Corps John Henry Russell, Jr.

- The first, USS Russell (DD-414), was a Sims-class destroyer, launched in 1938 and struck in 1945.
- The second, USS Russell (DDG-59), is an Arleigh Burke-class guided-missile destroyer, launched in 1993 and still in service.

== See also ==
- USS Richard B. Russell (SSN-687)
