= USS Road Runner =

Minesweeper of the United States Navy

- USS Road Runner drawing

History

United States
- Ordered: as Treasure Island
- Laid down: 1939
- Launched: 1939
- Acquired: 27 November 1940
- In service: 2 June 1941
- Out of service: 15 September 1944
- Stricken: 14 October 1944
- Fate: Sold to her former owner on 5 February 1945

General characteristics
- Displacement: 175 tons
- Length: 81 ft 0 in (24.69 m)
- Beam: 20 ft 8 in (6.30 m)
- Draught: 4 ft 5 in (1.35 m)
- Speed: 9.0 knots
- Complement: 16
- Armament: two .30 cal (7.62 mm) machine guns

USS Road Runner (AMc-35) was a coastal minesweeper acquired by the United States Navy for the task of removing mines from minefields laid in the water to prevent ships from passing.

Road Runner was named after the bird of that name: a speedy, largely terrestrial bird of the cuckoo family, found from California to Mexico and eastward to Texas.

Road Runner was built in 1939 as Treasure Island, California, by Western Boat Building Co, Tacoma, Washington; acquired by the Navy on 27 November 1940 from Mr. August Felando of San Pedro, Los Angeles; converted at South Coast Co., Newport Beach, California, and placed in service on 2 June 1941.

== World War II service ==
Road Runner, a wooden coastal minesweeper, served her three-year, World War II career with the 11th Naval District and the Western Sea Frontier with a homeport of San Pedro and a home yard of Mare Island, California.

Her operations involved daily minesweeping out of San Pedro, sometimes running to Santa Catalina Island or south to San Diego.

== Deactivation ==
Road Runner was taken out of service on 15 September 1944. She was struck from the Navy list on 14 October 1944, transferred to the War Shipping Administration on 5 February 1945, and sold to her former owner.
