= USS Reeves =

USS Reeves may refer to the following ships of the United States Navy:

- USS Reeves (DE-94), a Buckley-class destroyer escort delivered to the Royal Navy in 1943 as HMS Cosby (K559).
- USS Reeves (DE-156), a Buckley-class destroyer escort in commission from 1943 to 1946.
- USS Reeves (DLG-24), a Leahy-class destroyer leader in commission from 1964 to 1993, reclassified as a guided-missile cruiser (CG-24) in 1975.
