= USS Roberts =

USS Roberts may refer to more than one United States Navy ship:

- USS Roberts (DE-749), a destroyer escort in service from 1944 to 1964
- USS John Q. Roberts (DE-235), a destroyer escort converted during construction into the high-speed transport USS John Q. Roberts (APD-94)
- USS John Q. Roberts (APD-94), a high-speed transport in commission from 1944 to 1946
- USS Samuel B. Roberts, the name of various ships
