= USS Quinnebaug =

Multiple ships of the United States Navy have been named USS Quinnebaug.

- USS Quinnebaug (1866) was a sloop-of-war, commissioned in 1867 and decommissioned in 1870.
- USS Quinnebaug (1875) was a corvette, commissioned in 1878 and decommissioned in 1889.
- USS Quinnebaug (SP-1687)
- USS Quinnebaug (SP-2478)
- USS Quinnebaug (AOG-71) was a gasoline tanker.
