= USS Roselle (SP-350) =

Minesweeper of the United States Navy

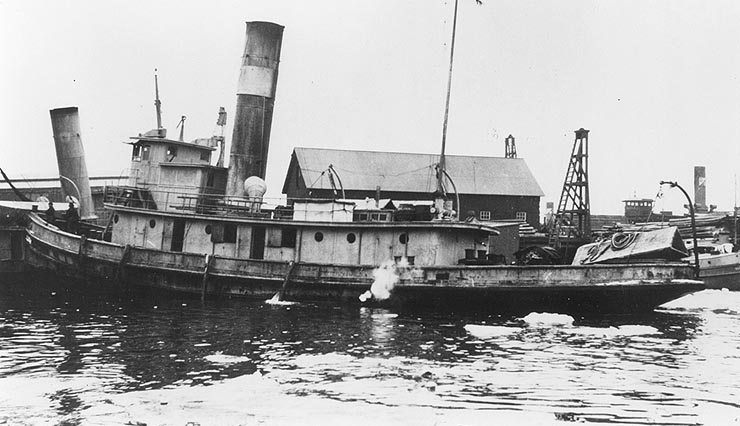
- Roselle in commercial service, probably sometime before her 1917 U.S. Navy service as the minesweeper USS Roselle (SP-350).

History

United States
- Name: USS Roselle
- Namesake: Previous name retained
- Completed: 1903
- Acquired: 10 May 1917
- Commissioned: 22 September 1917
- Fate: Returned to owner 31 December 1917
- Notes: Operated as commercial tug Roselle 1903–1917 and 1918-1936 and as commercial tug Fearless from 1936 to probably 1942

General characteristics
- Type: Minesweeper
- Tonnage: 220 gross register tons
- Length: 110 ft 1 in (33.55 m)
- Beam: 24 ft (7.3 m)
- Draft: 13 ft 10 in (4.22 m)
- Speed: 12 knots
- Complement: 21
- Armament: 1 × 1-pounder gun

The first USS Roselle (SP-350) was a minesweeper that served in the United States Navy during 1917. Roselle was built as a commercial steam harbor tug of the same name in 1903 by Neafie and Levy at Philadelphia. On 10 May 1917, the U.S. Navy acquired her from her owners, the Central Railroad Company of New Jersey, for use as a minesweeper during World War I. She was commissioned on 22 September 1917 as USS Roselle (SP-350). Assigned to the 3rd Naval District, Roselle was based at Tompkinsville, Staten Island, New York. She conducted minesweeping patrols in Long Island Sound.

On 31 December 1917, the Navy returned Roselle to the Central Railroad Company of New Jersey, which required her services for work deemed vital to national defense. Roselle continued in commercial service after World War I under various owners. In 1936, she was renamed Fearless. Fearless's name disappeared from registers of commercial vessels in 1942.
