= USS Raccoon (SP-506) =

Patrol vessel of the United States Navy

History

United States
- Name: USS Raccoon
- Namesake: Previous name retained
- Builder: George Lawley & Son, Neponset, Massachusetts
- Launched: 1915
- Completed: 1915
- Acquired: 5 May 1917
- Commissioned: 5 May 1917
- Fate: Returned to owner 17 January 1919
- Notes: Operated as private motorboat Raccoon 1915-1917 and 1919-1924 and Constance 1924-1925

General characteristics
- Type: Patrol vessel
- Tonnage: 16 GRT
- Length: 50 ft (15 m)
- Beam: 10 ft 1 in (3.07 m)
- Draft: 3 ft 6 in (1.07 m)
- Speed: 22 knots (41 km/h; 25 mph)
- Complement: 6
- Armament: 1 × 1-pounder gun; 1 × machine gun

The first USS Raccoon (SP-506) was a United States Navy patrol vessel in commission from 1917 to 1919.

== Construction and career ==
Raccoon was launched in 1915 as a private wooden-hulled motorboat of the same name by George Lawley & Son at Neponset, Massachusetts, and completed that year. On 5 May 1917, the U.S. Navy acquired her from her owner, Francis W. Fabyan of Cambridge, Massachusetts, for use as a section patrol vessel during World War I. She was commissioned as USS Raccoon (SP-506) the same day.

Raccoon operated on section patrol duty at New London, Connecticut, until December 1917, when she was transferred to Newport, Rhode Island. She patrolled at Newport through the end of World War I.

Raccoon's armament was removed on 3 December 1918, and she was returned to Fabyan on 17 January 1919 and resumed service as a private motorboat. Following two subsequent changes in ownership, she was renamed Constance in 1924. She disappeared from mercantile registers in 1925.
