= USS Quail (AM-377) =

Minesweeper of the United States Navy

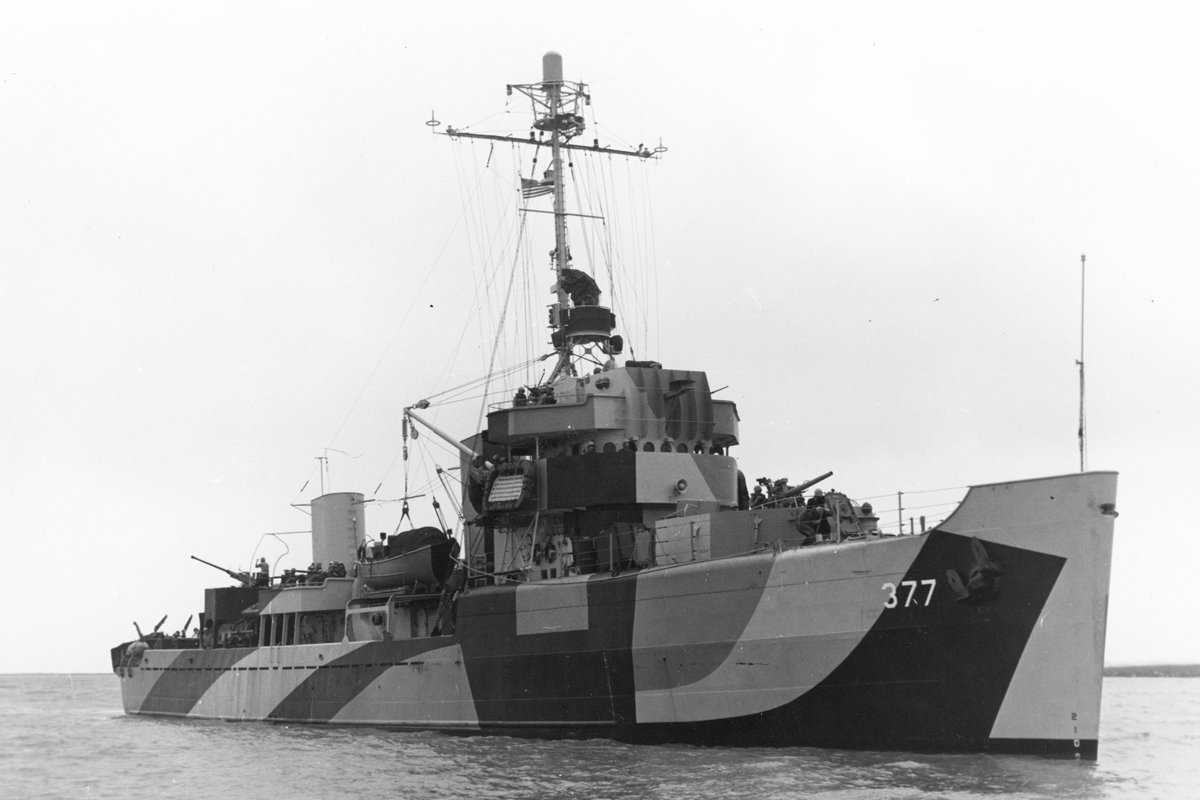
- Quail probably at Little Creek, Virginia in early 1945.

History

United States
- Name: USS Quail
- Builder: Savannah Machine and Foundry Co., Savannah, Georgia
- Laid down: 12 April 1944
- Launched: 20 August 1944
- Commissioned: 5 March 1945
- Decommissioned: April 1946
- Recommissioned: 1950 (?)
- Decommissioned: 12 August 1955
- Reclassified: MSF-377, 7 February 1955
- Stricken: 1 December 1966
- Honours and awards: 1 battle stars (World War II)
- Fate: Sold for scrapping

General characteristics
- Class & type: Auk-class minesweeper
- Displacement: 890 long tons (904 t)
- Length: 221 ft 3 in (67.44 m)
- Beam: 32 ft (9.8 m)
- Draft: 10 ft 9 in (3.28 m)
- Speed: 18 knots (33 km/h; 21 mph)
- Complement: 100 officers and enlisted
- Armament: 1 × 3"/50 caliber gun; 2 × 40 mm guns; 2 × 20 mm guns; 2 × Depth charge tracks

USS Quail (AM-377/MSF-377) was an Auk-class minesweeper acquired by the United States Navy for the dangerous task of removing mines from minefields laid in the water to prevent ships from passing.

Quail was named after the "quail," a migratory game bird.

It was the second ship in the U.S. Navy to be named USS Quail, and was laid down by the Savannah Machine and Foundry Co., Savannah, Georgia, 12 April 1944; launched 20 August 1944; sponsored by Miss Vivian Rahn; and commissioned 5 March 1945.

== Pacific Ocean operations ==
After fitting out and shakedown, Quail got underway 10 May for Guantanamo Bay, Cuba, to conduct antisubmarine exercises. She then transited the Panama Canal to arrive in San Diego, California. She departed for the Pacific Ocean theater of operation on 4 June, arriving Saipan on 28 August, where she was assigned to the Marianas Group.

Quail sailed for Okinawa, arriving 19 September, and then for Wakayama Wan, south coast of Honshū, Japan. She conducted minesweeping operations in the Pacific Ocean until 4 April 1946, when she reported for inactivation at San Diego, California.

== Decommissioning ==
Decommissioned, Quail later returned to active duty with the U.S. Atlantic Fleet. Redesignated MSF-377, 7 February 1955, she was placed out of commission, in reserve, and berthed at Green Cove Springs, Florida, 12 August 1955. She was struck from the Naval Vessel Register 1 December 1966, and was disposed of by scrapping.

== Awards ==
Quail received one battle star for World War II service.
