= USS Rhea (AMc-58) =

Minesweeper of the United States Navy

History

United States
- Launched: 9 August 1941
- Acquired: 31 December 1940
- In service: 15 October 1941
- Out of service: 22 January 1946
- Stricken: 7 February 1946
- Fate: Sold

General characteristics
- Displacement: 340 tons
- Length: 98 ft 6 in (30.02 m)
- Beam: 24 ft (7.3 m)
- Draught: 11 ft (3.4 m)
- Speed: 10.0 knots
- Complement: 17
- Armament: two .50 cal (12.7 mm) machine guns

USS Rhea (AMc-58) was a coastal minesweeper acquired by the U.S. Navy for the dangerous task of removing mines from minefields laid in the water to prevent ships from passing.

The first ship to be named Rhea by the Navy, AMc-58 was laid down as a wooden purse-seiner, Hull No. 250, by the Martinolich Shipbuilding Company; purchased on the ways by the Navy 31 December 1940 and designated AMc-58; named Rhea, 5 March 1941; launched 9 August 1941; sponsored by Miss Marjorie Strong; and placed in service 15 October 1941.

== World War II service ==
Fitted out at San Diego, California, Rhea, equipped with acoustical, magnetic, and "O"-type gear, remained on the U.S. West Coast, at San Francisco, California, until she sailed west in early March 1942 to assume duties in the 14th Naval District. Arriving at Pearl Harbor 11 March, she operated in Hawaiian waters until she returned to San Diego after the end of World War II.

Placed out of service 22 January 1946, she was struck from the Navy list 7 February 1946; released to the Maritime Commission 30 December 1947, and, subsequently, sold to Demiter J. Callian.
