= USS Rockport (SP-738) =

Patrol vessel of the United States Navy

History

United States
- Name: USS Rockport (SP-738)
- Builder: Adams Shipbuilding Co., East Boothbay, ME
- Launched: 1917
- Acquired: 2 October 1917
- Commissioned: as USS Ajax (SP 738), 16 February 1918
- Decommissioned: 18 February 1919
- Fate: Sold 16 September 1919

General characteristics
- Displacement: 200 t
- Length: 124 ft 7 in (37.97 m)
- Beam: 25 ft 7 in (7.80 m)
- Draft: 13 ft 6 in (4.11 m)
- Speed: 10 knots (19 km/h)
- Complement: 23
- Armament: one 3-pounder

The second USS Rockport (SP-738) was built during 1917 and 1918 by Adams Shipbuilding Co., East Boothbay, Maine, as the wooden scientific research vessel Ajax for service in Labrador waters and acquired 2 October 1917 for U.S. Navy service from A. Fabbri of New York City, while still under construction. Commissioned 16 February 1918. Ajax was renamed Rockport 20 February 1918.

Rockport was reassigned to the 1st Naval District 1 January 1918 and operated on section patrol duty based at Boston into 1919. She decommissioned 18 February 1919 and was sold 16 September 1919 to Thomas S. Longridge of Belmont, Mass.
