= USS Racine (PF-100) =

Tacoma-class frigate

History

United States
- Name: Racine
- Namesake: City of Racine, Wisconsin
- Builder: American Ship Building Company, Cleveland, Ohio
- Laid down: 14 September 1943
- Launched: 15 March 1944
- Commissioned: 22 January 1945
- Decommissioned: 27 June 1946
- Stricken: 19 July 1946
- Fate: Sold for scrapping, 2 December 1947

General characteristics
- Class & type: Tacoma-class frigate
- Displacement: 1,430 long tons (1,453 t) light; 2,415 long tons (2,454 t) full
- Length: 303 ft 11 in (92.63 m)
- Beam: 37 ft 6 in (11.43 m)
- Draft: 13 ft 8 in (4.17 m)
- Propulsion: 2 × 5,500 shp (4,101 kW) turbines; 3 boilers; 2 shafts
- Speed: 20 knots (37 km/h; 23 mph)
- Complement: 190
- Armament: 3 × 3"/50 dual purpose guns (3x1); 4 x 40 mm guns (2×2); 9 × 20 mm guns (9×1); 1 × Hedgehog anti-submarine mortar; 8 × Y-gun depth charge projectors; 2 × Depth charge tracks

USS Racine (PF-100), a Tacoma-class frigate, was the first ship of the United States Navy to be named for Racine, Wisconsin.

== Construction ==
The first Racine (PF-100) was laid down by the American Ship Building Company, in Cleveland, Ohio, 14 September 1943; launched on 15 March 1944, sponsored by Mrs. Francis H. Wendt; and commissioned on 22 January 1945, at Houston, Texas.

== Service history ==
A Navy patrol frigate crewed by the Coast Guard, Racine underwent shakedown off Bermuda and Guantánamo Bay, Cuba, escorting the Italian submarine Atropo from one to the other. Returning to the east coast, she departed Norfolk, Virginia, on 2 April for Oran, Algeria, with convoy UGS 84, returning to the United States with convoy GUS 86.

After training exercises in Casco Bay, Maine, and conversion at New York to a weather patrol ship for distant duty, Racine steamed on 7 August for the Panama Canal and Pearl Harbor. On 6 September she departed Pearl Harbor for Tacloban, Leyte Gulf, Philippine Islands, arriving there on 23 September to serve as a weather station ship. On 14 April 1946 she departed Samar, Philippine Islands, to return to the United States, arriving at Seattle on 12 May.

Racine decommissioned at Bremerton, Washington, on 27 June 1946 and was struck from the Navy list on 19 July 1946. She was sold to Franklin Ship Wrecking Company, of Hillside, New Jersey, on 2 December 1947 for scrapping.
