= USS Quest (SP-171) =

Patrol vessel of the United States Navy

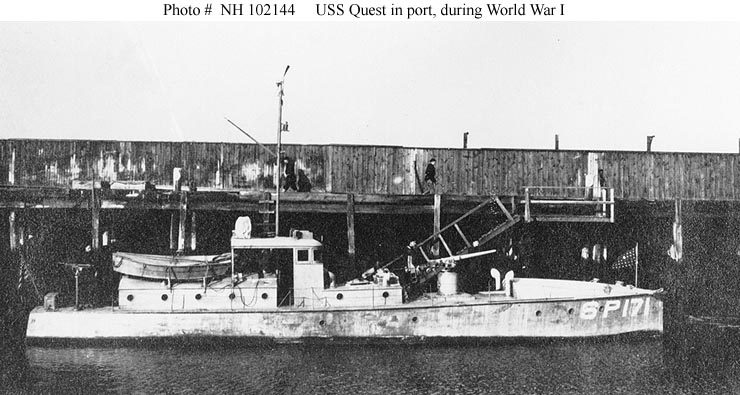
- USS Quest during World War I.

History

United States
- Name: USS Quest
- Namesake: Previous name retained
- Builder: Greenport Basin and Drydock Company, Greenport, New York
- Completed: 1916
- Acquired: 26 July 1917
- Commissioned: 8 September 1917
- Fate: Returned to owner 7 January 1919
- Notes: Operated as civilian motorboat Whippet and Quest 1916-1917 and as Quest from 1919

General characteristics
- Type: Patrol vessel
- Displacement: 12.5 tons
- Length: 60 ft (18 m)
- Beam: 10 ft (3.0 m)
- Draft: 1 ft 8 in (0.51 m)
- Speed: 22 knots
- Armament: 1 × 3-pounder gun; 2 × machine guns

The first USS Quest (SP-171) was a United States Navy patrol vessel in commission from 1917 to 1919.

Quest was built as the civilian motorboat Whippet for U.S. Navy Lieutenant Commander Daniel Bacon in 1916 by the Greenport Basin and Drydock Company at Greenport on Long Island, New York, using the same hull design as some submarine chasers then being constructed for the Imperial Russian Navy; though under civilian ownership, Whippet may have been intended for possible U.S. Navy use as part of the contemporary Preparedness Movement. She soon was renamed Quest.

The U.S. Navy chartered Quest from her owner on 26 July 1917 for World War I service as a patrol vessel. She was commissioned on 8 September 1917 as USS Quest (SP-171).

Quest was assigned to the 2nd Naval District and based at New Bedford, Massachusetts. She performed section patrol duty along the coast of southern New England for the rest of World War I.

Quest was returned to her owner on 7 January 1919 at Greenport.
