= USS Radiant (ID-1324) =

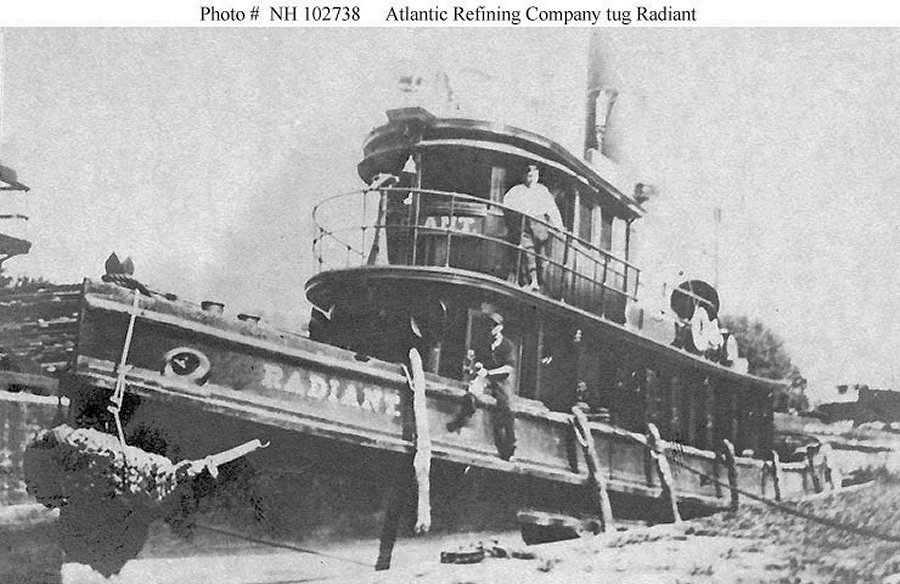
- Radiant sometime between 1903 and 1917.

History

United States
- Owner: Atlantic Refining Company
- Builder: Neafie & Levy, Philadelphia, Pennsylvania
- Completed: 1903
- Acquired: Never
- Commissioned: Never
- Notes: Registered as ID-1324 for potential US Navy service

General characteristics
- Type: Tugboat
- Tonnage: 81 GRT (Note: NavSource Online states that both the Gross register tonnage and displacement tonnage were 81 tons, although it is very unlikely that the two tonnages were identical.)
- Displacement: 81 tons
- Beam: 18 ft (5.5 m)
- Draft: 9 ft (2.7 m)

USS Radiant (ID-1324) was the proposed designation for a tugboat that never served in the United States Navy.

Radiant was a commercial tug that was built in 1903 by Neafie & Levy at Philadelphia, Pennsylvania. During the period of the United States' participation in World War I, the US Navy inspected her for possible acquisition by the Navy and assigned her the hull number ID-1324 in anticipation of commissioning her as USS Radiant. However, the Navy never took possession of her, and she remained in civilian service with her owners, the Atlantic Refining Company of Philadelphia.
