= USS Reindeer (ATA-189) =

Tugboat of the United States Navy

History

United States
- Name: Reindeer
- Builder: Levingston Shipbuilding Co., Orange, Texas
- Laid down: 11 September 1944
- Launched: 19 October 1944
- Commissioned: 20 December 1944
- Decommissioned: 29 August 1947
- Stricken: 1 September 1962
- Fate: Sold by the Maritime Administration, 28 March 1975, for non-transportation use, Arctic Seafood Corp

General characteristics
- Class & type: Sotoyomo-class auxiliary fleet tug
- Displacement: 534 t.(lt) 835 t.(fl)
- Length: 143 ft (44 m)
- Beam: 33 ft (10 m)
- Draft: 13 ft (4.0 m)
- Propulsion: diesel-electric engines, single screw
- Speed: 13 knots (24 km/h; 15 mph)
- Complement: 45
- Armament: one single 3 in (76 mm) dual purpose gun mount; two single 20 mm AA gun mounts

The third Reindeer (ATA-189), originally projected as ATR-116, was laid down by the Levingston Shipbuilding Co., Orange, Texas, 18 September 1944; launched 19 October 1944; and commissioned 20 December 1944.

Following shakedown in the Gulf of Mexico, Reindeer transited the Panama Canal, 30 January 1945, and arrived at Pearl Harbor 11 March. She then undertook towing operations to Eniwetok, Guam, Ulithi, Leyte, Guadalcanal, Hollandia, and back to Leyte where she was at war's end. Shifting to Okinawa in mid-September, she operated there until December, then moved on to Guam for operations until April 1946. She returned to Pearl Harbor 30 May via Manus and Kwajalein.

Operating out of San Diego and San Pedro from July through September, she transited the Panama Canal in October, reached Norfolk 2 November, then steamed to Orange, Tex., arriving 19 November. She was employed by the 19th Fleet for the next year and a half on towing assignments along the Gulf Coast from Galveston, Texas, to Mayport, Florida., and up to Charleston (in February 1947). Inactivation followed and she decommissioned at Orange, Texas, 29 August 1947. A unit of the "mothball" fleet, she was berthed at Orange until moved to Galveston, 21 November 1948, and finally to Green Cove Springs, Florida, 25 June 1958. She remained berthed at Green Cove Springs until transferred to the Maritime Administration in March 1961, and berthed in the National Defense Reserve Fleet at James River, Virginia, where she remained until 1970.
