= USS Rocket (1862) =

Tugboat of the United States Navy

History

United States
- Name: USS Rocket
- Ordered: as J. P. Billard
- Laid down: Date unknown
- Launched: 1862
- Acquired: 12 October 1863
- Commissioned: 1863
- Decommissioned: 1899
- Stricken: 27 October 1899
- Fate: Sold, 28 December 1899

General characteristics
- Type: Tugboat
- Displacement: 187 long tons (190 t)
- Length: 85 ft 8 in (26.11 m)
- Beam: 18 ft 10 in (5.74 m)
- Draft: 7 ft (2.1 m)
- Depth of hold: 8 ft (2.4 m)
- Propulsion: Screw propelled
- Speed: 8.5 knots (15.7 km/h; 9.8 mph)

USS Rocket was a tugboat acquired by the Union Navy during the American Civil War. She was used by the Navy to patrol navigable waterways of the Confederacy to prevent the South from trading with other countries.

Rocket, built at Mystic, Connecticut, in 1862 as the wooden harbor tug J. P. Billard, was purchased for the Navy on 12 October 1863 from Copeland & Howe at New York City and renamed the same day.

== Service during the American Civil War ==
Rocket served as an ordnance tug carrying weapons and ammunition in New York Navy Yard during and after the Civil War. Reboilered in 1884, Rocket was subsequently transferred to Boston Navy Yard to perform yard tug duties.

== Service during the Spanish–American War ==
Thoroughly overhauled at Portsmouth Navy Yard (Maine) in 1889, Rocket's last service was as a fireboat and tug in Boston Navy Yard through the Spanish–American War.

== Final decommissioning ==
Stricken from the Navy List on 27 October 1899, Rocket was sold on 28 December 1899 to Carrie I. Hall at Newport, Rhode Island.

== See also ==
- Union Blockade
