= USS Radiant (AMc-99) =

Minesweeper of the United States Navy

History

United States
- Laid down: 26 June 1941
- Launched: 27 September 1941
- In service: 11 February 1942
- Out of service: 5 December 1945
- Stricken: 12 March 1946
- Fate: Sold, 7 February 1947

General characteristics
- Displacement: 228 tons (full load)
- Length: 97 ft 0 in (29.57 m)
- Beam: 22 ft 0 in (6.71 m)
- Draught: 9 ft 6 in (2.90 m)
- Speed: 10 knots
- Complement: 17
- Armament: two .50 cal (12.7 mm) machine guns

USS Radiant (AMc-99) was an Accentor-class coastal minesweeper acquired by the U.S. Navy for the dangerous task of removing mines from minefields laid in the water to prevent ships from passing.

Radiant was laid down by Anderson and Cristofani, San Francisco, California, 26 June 1941; launched 27 September 1941; sponsored by Mrs. V. Moyland; and placed in service 11 February 1942.

== World War II service ==
This wooden-hulled coastal minesweeper, equipped with magnetic, acoustic, and moored minesweep gear, was originally assigned to the 13th Naval District, with a home yard of Puget Sound. She operated off the Pacific Northwest until assigned to the newly-formed Seventeenth Naval District (Alaska and Aleutian islands) on 12 April 1944. Reassigned to the 13th Naval District 5 September 1944, she again served along the U. S. Northwest coast.

Radiant was placed out of service 5 December 1945. Radiant was struck from the Navy list 12 March 1946, transferred to the Maritime Commission, and sold to North Shore Packing Co., Ltd., 7 February 1947.
