= USS Reedbird (AMS-51) =

U.S. Navy minesweeper

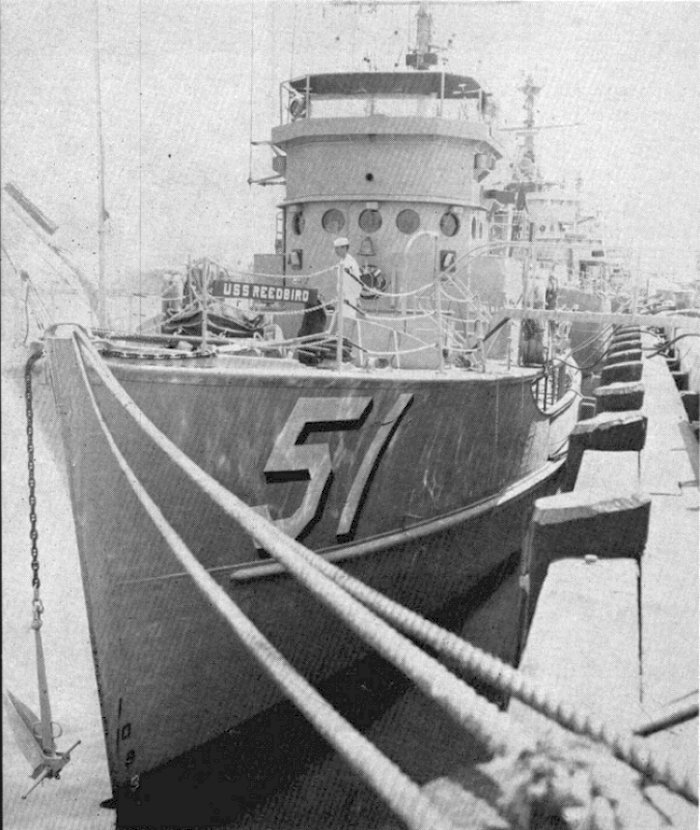

History

United States
- Ordered: as YMS-291
- Laid down: 29 January 1943
- Launched: 20 April 1943
- Commissioned: 9 August 1943
- Decommissioned: 1 November 1946
- In service: 1 September 1947
- Out of service: 1968
- Stricken: 1 October 1968
- Fate: fate unknown

General characteristics
- Displacement: 380 (full load)
- Length: 136 ft (41 m)
- Beam: 24 ft 6 in (7.47 m)
- Draught: 10 ft (3.0 m)
- Speed: 15 knots
- Complement: 32
- Armament: one 3 in (76 mm) gun mount, two 20 mm. machine guns, 2 depth charge tracks, 2 depth charge projectors

USS Reedbird (AMS-51/YMS-291) was a YMS-1-class minesweeper of the YMS-135 subclass acquired by the U.S. Navy for the dangerous task of removal of mines that had been placed in coastal waters to prevent ships from passing.

== Operational history ==
The second ship to be named Reedbird by the Navy was laid down as YMS-291 by the Associated Shipbuilders, Seattle, Washington, 29 January 1943; launched 20 April 1943, and commissioned 9 August 1943.

Delayed by a lack of equipment, YMS-291 completed shakedown 11 November 1943 and 4 days later reported for 5 months duty with the Western Sea Frontier. In mid-April 1944 she headed west to join the U.S. 5th Fleet's Amphibious Force for Operation Forager, the invasion and occupation of the Marianas. Assigned to TG 52.12, the minesweeping and hydrographic survey group, she commenced operations in the Marianas with the assault on Saipan, 15 June, continued them through operations against Guam and Tinian, into the new year, 1945. In late March, she steamed north, operated in the Iwo Jima area through the first week in April, then returned to Saipan, whence she sailed for the United States.

Arriving at San Pedro, California, 19 May, YMS-291 headed west again 20 July. Brief operations in Hawaii and in the Marshalls followed and, after the cessation of hostilities, she returned to Saipan where she joined task force TF 95 and continued westward for postwar sweeping operations in Japanese and Korean waters. From 3 November to 7 December she swept channels in the Fukuoka area, then shifted to Honshū and until March 1946 operated primarily in the Inland Sea.

YMS-291 departed Kobe for the United States 11 March. Arriving at San Francisco, California, 26 April, she was ordered to the U.S. East Coast whence she proceeded up the Atlantic coast, ascended the St. Lawrence River and entered the Great Lakes, arriving at her homeport, Chicago, Illinois, in the fall. There on 1 November 1946, she decommissioned and was placed in service for duty as a Naval Reserve Training Ship.

Named Reedbird and redesignated AMS-51, 1 September 1947, she trained Reservists of the 9th Naval District for 3 years. In November 1949 she headed for New Orleans, Louisiana, thence sailed to Orange, Texas, where she was placed out of service 6 December 1949 and berthed as a unit of the Atlantic Reserve Fleet.

She was recommissioned 15 February 1951 and assigned to the U.S. Atlantic Fleet. For the next 6½ years, Reedbird redesignated MSCO-51 on 7 February 1955, remained on the east coast, operating primarily in the Charleston, South Carolina, Yorktown, Virginia, Newport, Rhode Island, and Key West, Florida, areas on various assignments ranging from local operations and training exercises, including schoolship and Naval Reserve training duties, to operational testing for the Naval Ordnance Lab and hydrographic surveys.

Reassigned to the Pacific coast and to reserve training duties in September 1957, Reedbird transited the Panama Canal and in November arrived at San Diego, California, where she decommissioned 16 December.

Attached to the 11th Naval District as Naval Reserve Training Ship, she remained in southern California until transferred, 6 years later, to the 3rd Naval District and assigned reserve training duty at Portsmouth, New Hampshire.

The MSCO continued her training duties there until ordered to Philadelphia, Pennsylvania, in the summer of 1968 for inactivation. Then placed out of service and stripped, she was struck from the Navy list on 1 October 1968.

== Awards and honors ==
YMS-291 earned two battle stars during World War II.
