= USS Rickwood =

Patrol vessel of the United States Navy

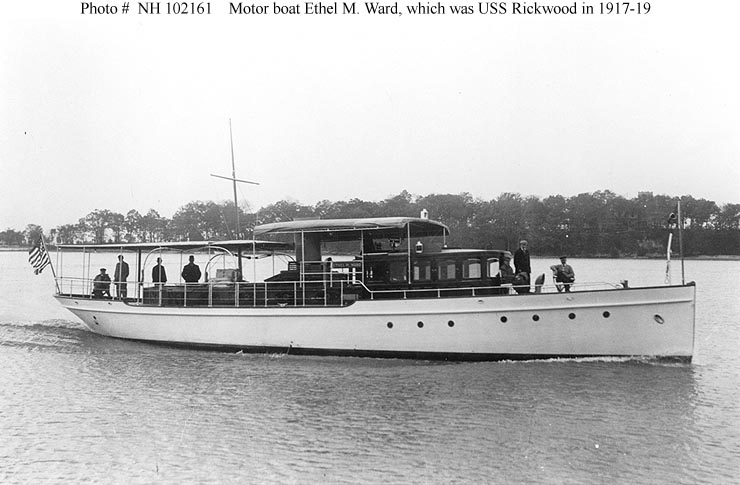
- Rickwood prior to World War I as the private motorboat Ethel M. Ward.

History

United States
- Name: USS Rickwood
- Namesake: Previous name retained
- Builder: Matthews Boat Company, Port Clinton, Ohio
- Completed: 1910
- Acquired: 9 June 1917
- Commissioned: 18 June 1917
- Fate: Returned to owner 3 March 1919
- Notes: Operated as private motorboat Ethel M. Ward and Rickwood 1910-1917 and as Rickwood 1919-1955

General characteristics
- Type: Patrol vessel
- Tonnage: 40 gross register tons
- Length: 72 ft 2.33 in (22.0048 m)
- Beam: 13 ft 6 in (4.11 m)
- Draft: 4 ft 3 in (1.30 m)
- Speed: 9 knots
- Complement: 9
- Armament: 1 × 3-pounder gun

USS Rickwood (SP-597) was a United States Navy patrol vessel in commission from 1917 to 1919.

Rickwood was built as the private motorboat Ethel M. Ward by the Matthews Boat Company at Port Clinton, Ohio, in 1910. She later was renamed Rickwood.

On 9 June 1917, the U.S. Navy acquired Rickwood from her owner, A. H. Woodward of Woodward, Alabama, for use as a section patrol boat during World War I. She was commissioned as USS Rickwood (SP-597) on 18 June 1918.

Assigned to Naval Air Station Pensacola at Pensacola, Florida, Rickwood patrolled the Florida coast near Pensacola for the rest of World War I and into January 1919. She also recovered downed aircrews and aircraft and performed other local search and rescue work, provided ferry service between the naval air station and the city of Pensacola, and performed local towing work.

On 28 January 1919, Rickwood was reassigned from Naval Air Station Pensacola to Naval Station Pensacola.

Rickwood was returned to Woodward on 3 March 1919. After that, she had a long civilian career, remaining on mercantile registers until 1955.
