= USS Ruff (AMc-59) =

Minesweeper of the United States Navy

History

United States
- Ordered: as Speaker
- Laid down: 1940
- Launched: 24 April 1941
- Acquired: 31 December 1940
- In service: 31 October 1941
- Out of service: 23 January 1946
- Stricken: 7 February 1946
- Fate: Disposed of, 29 August 1947

General characteristics
- Displacement: 340 tons
- Length: 98 ft 6 in (30.02 m)
- Beam: 24 ft (7.3 m)
- Draught: 11 ft (3.4 m)
- Speed: 10.0 knots
- Complement: 17
- Armament: two .50 cal (12.7 mm) machine guns

USS Ruff (AMc-59) was a coastal minesweeper acquired by the U.S. Navy for the dangerous task of removing mines from minefields laid in the water to prevent ships from passing.

The first ship to be named Ruff by the Navy, AMc-59, originally named Speaker, was laid down in 1940 by Martinolich Shipbuilding Co., San Diego, California; acquired by the Navy 31 December 1940; named Ruff and designated AMc-59 on 5 March 1941; launched 24 April 1941; sponsored by Miss Martha Jane Shown; and placed in service 31 October 1941.

== World War II service ==
Assigned the 14th Naval District, Ruff was escorted to Pearl Harbor where she arrived 11 March 1942 for duty. A coastal minesweeper equipped with acoustical, magnetic and "O" type gear, she operated in the Hawaiian Islands throughout the war. From January 1943 through September, she was stationed at the section base at Bishops' Point, Oahu, Hawaii. She remained with the Hawaiian local defense forces through September 1945.

Ruff was placed out of service at San Diego 23 January 1946, was struck from the Navy list 7 February 1946, and released to the Maritime Commission for disposal 29 August 1947.
