= USS Reliable (SP-352) =

American patrol vessel during World War I

History

United States
- Name: USS Reliable
- Notes: No records regarding Reliable's construction, acquisition, naval service, or fate have been found

General characteristics
- Type: Probably a patrol vessel
- Notes: No records regarding Reliable's characteristics and performance have been found

USS Reliable (SP-352) was a boat or ship which the United States Navy at least considered for service during World War I. Although she received the section patrol number 352, no record of her characteristics or service have been found.
