= USS Roamer (SP-1047) =

Patrol vessel of the United States Navy

History

United States
- Name: USS Roamer
- Namesake: Previous name retained
- Builder: Herreshoff Manufacturing Company, Bristol, Rhode Island
- Completed: 1902
- Acquired: 29 June 1917
- Commissioned: 20 July 1917
- Decommissioned: 28 January 1919
- Stricken: 17 June 1919
- Fate: Sold 19 July 1919
- Notes: Operated as civilian launch Roamer 1902-1917

General characteristics
- Type: Patrol vessel
- Length: 93 ft (28 m)
- Beam: 17 ft 2 in (5.23 m)
- Draft: 5 ft (1.5 m)
- Propulsion: Steam engine
- Speed: 10 knots
- Complement: 16
- Armament: 2 × 1-pounder guns; 2 × machine guns

The first USS Roamer (SP-1047) was a United States Navy patrol vessel in commission from 1917 to 1919.

Roamer was built as a civilian steam launch of the same name in 1902 by Herreshoff Manufacturing Company at Bristol, Rhode Island. On 29 June 1917, the U.S. Navy acquired her from the State of Florida at Tallahassee, Florida, for use as a section patrol boat during World War I. She was commissioned on 20 July 1917 as USS Roamer (SP-1047).

Assigned to the 8th Naval District, Roamer carried out patrol duties for the rest of World War I.

Roamer was decommissioned on 28 January 1919. She was stricken from the Navy List on 17 June 1919 and sold to Frank A. Egan of New Rochelle, New York, on 19 July 1919.
