= USS SC-501 =

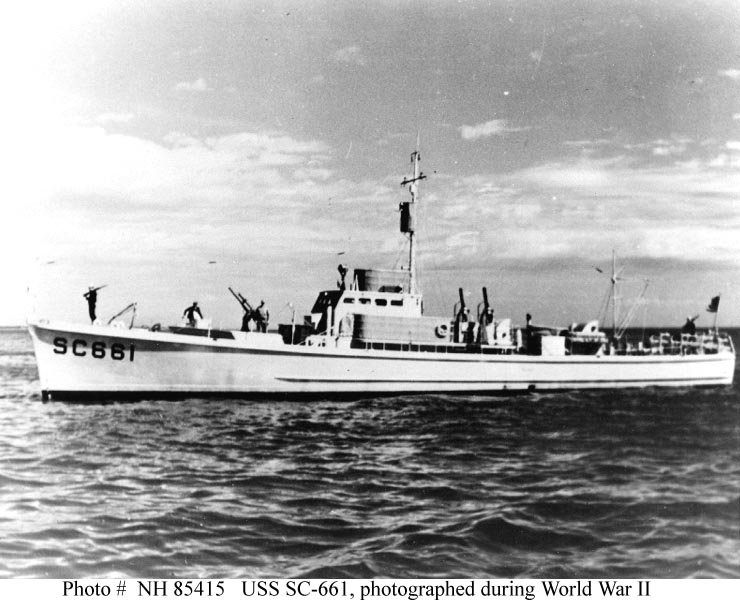
- USS SC-661, a fellow SC-497 class submarine chaser.

History

United States
- Name: USS SC-499
- Operator: United States Navy; United States Coast Guard
- Builder: Seabrook Yacht Corporation
- Laid down: 29 April 1941
- Launched: 24 January 1942
- Stricken: 5 June 1946
- Fate: Sold on 20 December 1946.

General characteristics
- Class & type: SC-497 class submarine chaser
- Type: submarine chaser
- Displacement: 148 tons
- Length: 110 ft 10 in (34 m)
- Beam: 17 ft (5 m)
- Draft: 6 ft 6 in (2 m)
- Propulsion: 2 × 800bhp General Motors 8-268A diesel engines, Snow and Knobstedt single reduction gear; 2 × shafts
- Speed: 21 knots
- Complement: 28
- Armament: 1 × 40 mm gun mount; 2 × .50 cal (12.7 mm) machine guns; 2 × Y-guns; 2 × ducts

USS SC-501 was a SC-497 class submarine chaser that served in the United States Coast Guard and later the United States Navy during World War II. She was originally laid down as PC-501 on 29 April 1941 by the Seabrook Yacht Corporation in Houston, Texas, and launched on 24 January 1942. She was reclassified SC-501 on 8 April 1943, and acquired from the Coast Guard on 9 April 1943. She was reclassified as Unclassified Miscellaneous Vessel IX-100 on 21 April 1943 and named Racer on 3 May 1943. She was in service from 27 May 1943 to 21 May 1946. She was struck from the Navy Register on 5 June 1946 and sold to the private market on 20 December 1946.
