= List of Victory ships (Q-R) =

This is a list of Victory ships with names beginning with Q or R.

== Description ==
A Victory ship was a cargo ship. The cargo ships were 455 feet 3 inches (138.76 m) overall, 436 feet 6 inches (133.05 m) between perpendiculars They had a beam of 62 feet 0 inches (18.90 m), a depth of 38 feet 0 inches (11.58 m) and a draught of 28 feet 0 inches (8.53 m). They were assessed at 7,612 GRT, 4,555 NRT and 10,750 DWT.

The ships were powered by a triple expansion steam engine, driving a steam turbine via double reduction gear. This gave the ship a speed of 15.5 knots (28.7 km/h) or 16.5 knots (30.6 km/h), depending on the machinery installed.

Liberty ships had five holds. No. 1 hold was 57 feet 6 inches (17.53 m) long, with a capacity of 81,715 cubic feet (2,313.9 m^{3}), No. 2 hold was 45 feet 0 inches (13.72 m) long, with a capacity of 89,370 cubic feet (2,531 m^{3}), No. 3 hold was 78 feet 0 inches (23.77 m) long, with a capacity of 158,000 cubic feet (4,500 m^{3}), No. 4 hold was 81 feet 0 inches (24.69 m) long, with a capacity of 89,370 cubic feet (2,531 m^{3}) and No. 5 hold was 75 feet 0 inches (22.86 m) long, with a capacity of 81,575 cubic feet (2,309.9 m^{3}).

In wartime service, they carried a crew of 62, plus 28 gunners. The ships carried four lifeboats. Two were powered, with a capacity of 27 people and two were unpowered, with a capacity of 29 people.

== Queens Victory ==
Queens Victory was built by California Shipbuilding Corporation, Terminal Island, Los Angeles, California. Her keel was laid on 17 March 1945. She was launched on 12 May and delivered on 7 June. Built for the War Shipping Administration (WSA), she was operated under the management of Burns Steamship Company. Laid up in Suisun Bay in 1950. Returned to service in 1966 due to the Vietnam War. Operated under the management of Weyerhaeuser Steamship Company. Laid up in Suisun Bay in 1973. She was for disposal in 2006.

== Quinault Victory ==
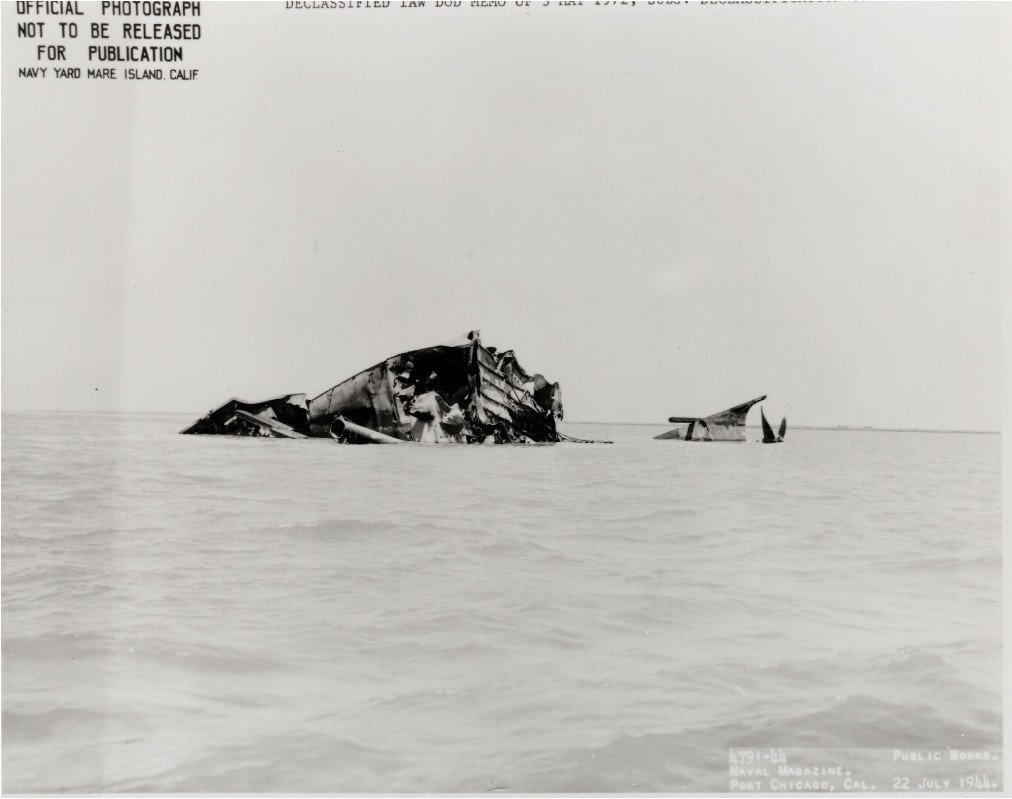
The wreck of Quinault Victory after the Port Chicago disaster.

Quinault Victory was built by Oregon Shipbuilding Corporation, Portland, Oregon. Her keel was laid on 3 May 1944. She was launched on 17 June and delivered on 11 July. Built for the WSA, she was operated under the management of United States Lines. She was destroyed in the Port Chicago disaster on 17 July 1944 at Port Chicago, California when the Liberty ship E. A. Bryan exploded as it was being loaded with ammunition.

== Radcliffe Victory ==
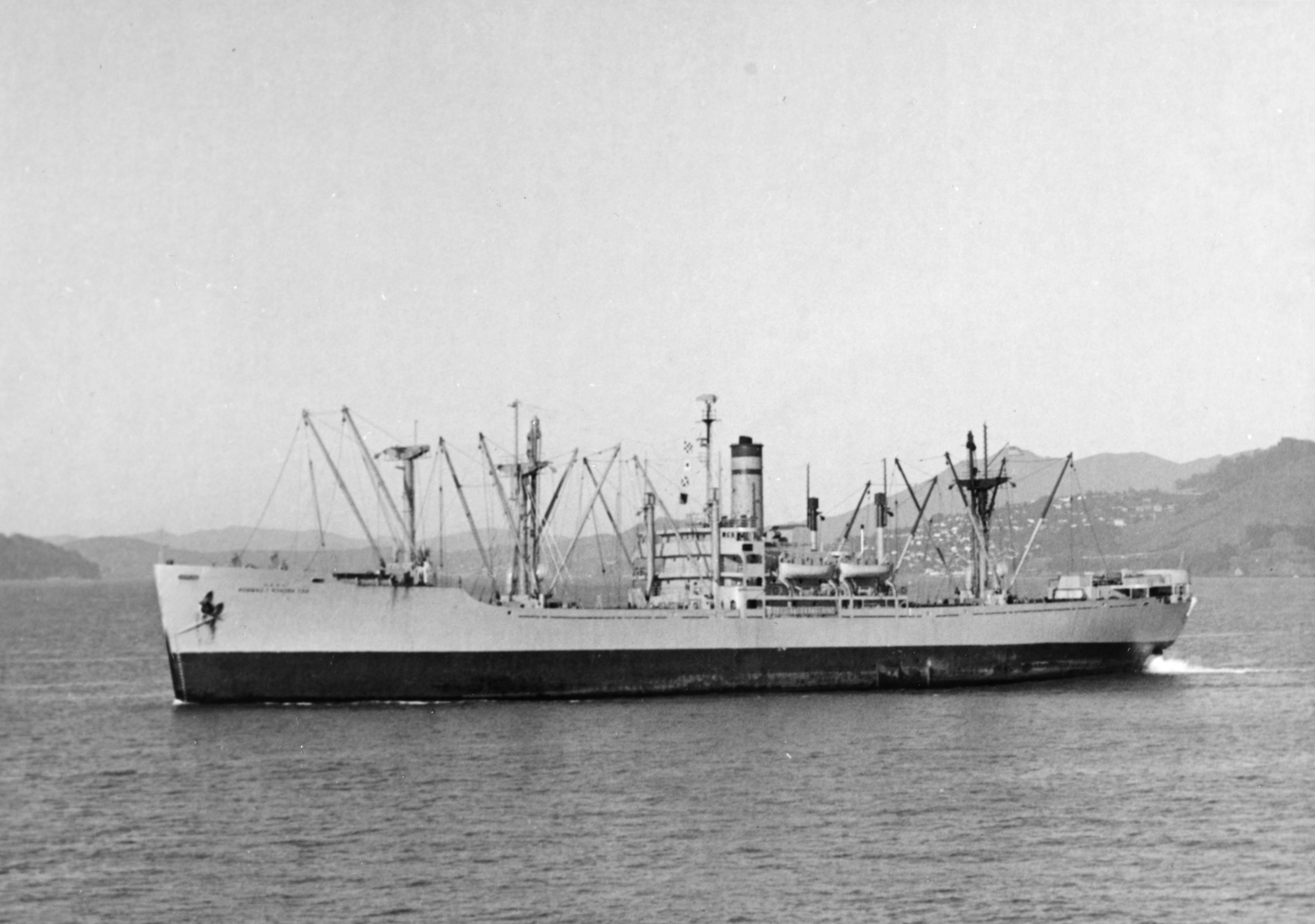
USNS Sgt. Andrew Miller

Radcliffe Victory was built by Permanente Metals Corporation, Richmond, California. Her keel was laid on 3 March 1945. She was launched on 14 April and delivered on 9 May. Built for the WSA, she was operated under the management of American West African Lines. To the United States Army Transportation Corps in 1946 and renamed Sgt. Andrew Miller. To the United States Navy in 1950. Operated by the Military Sea Transportation Service. To the United States Maritime Administration in 1976. Laid up in the James River. She was sold for scrapping in 1983.

== Randall ==
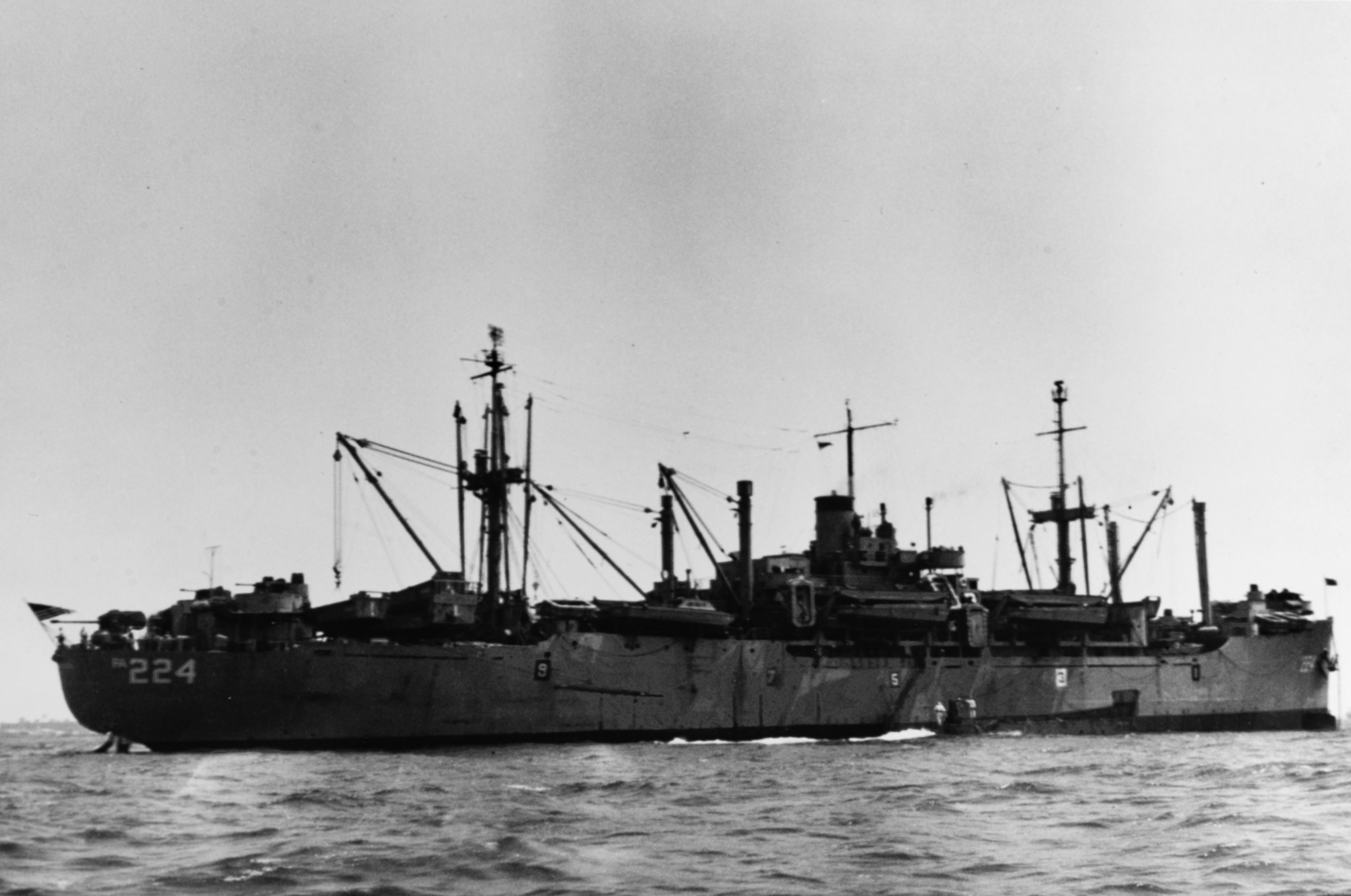
USS Randall

Randall was built by Permanente Metals Corporation. Her keel was laid on 15 September 1944. She was launched on 15 November and delivered on 16 December. Built for the United States Navy. Decommissioned in 1956 and laid up in reserve at Orange, Texas. To the United States Maritime Administration in 1960. Laid up at Mobile, Alabama. She was sold for scrapping at Panama City, Florida in October 1971.

== Rawlins ==
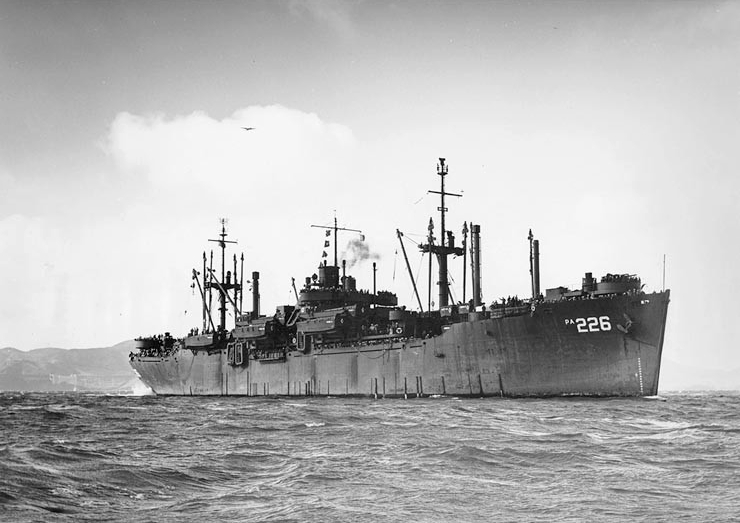
USS Rawlins

Rawlins was built by Kaiser Company, Vancouver, Washington. Her keel was laid on 10 August 1944.She was launched on 21 October and delivered on 10 November. Built for the United States Navy. Decommissioned in 1946 and placed in reserve. To the United States Maritime Administration in 1959. Laid up in the James River. She was scrapped at Kaohsiung, Taiwan in 1988.

== Red Oak Victory ==
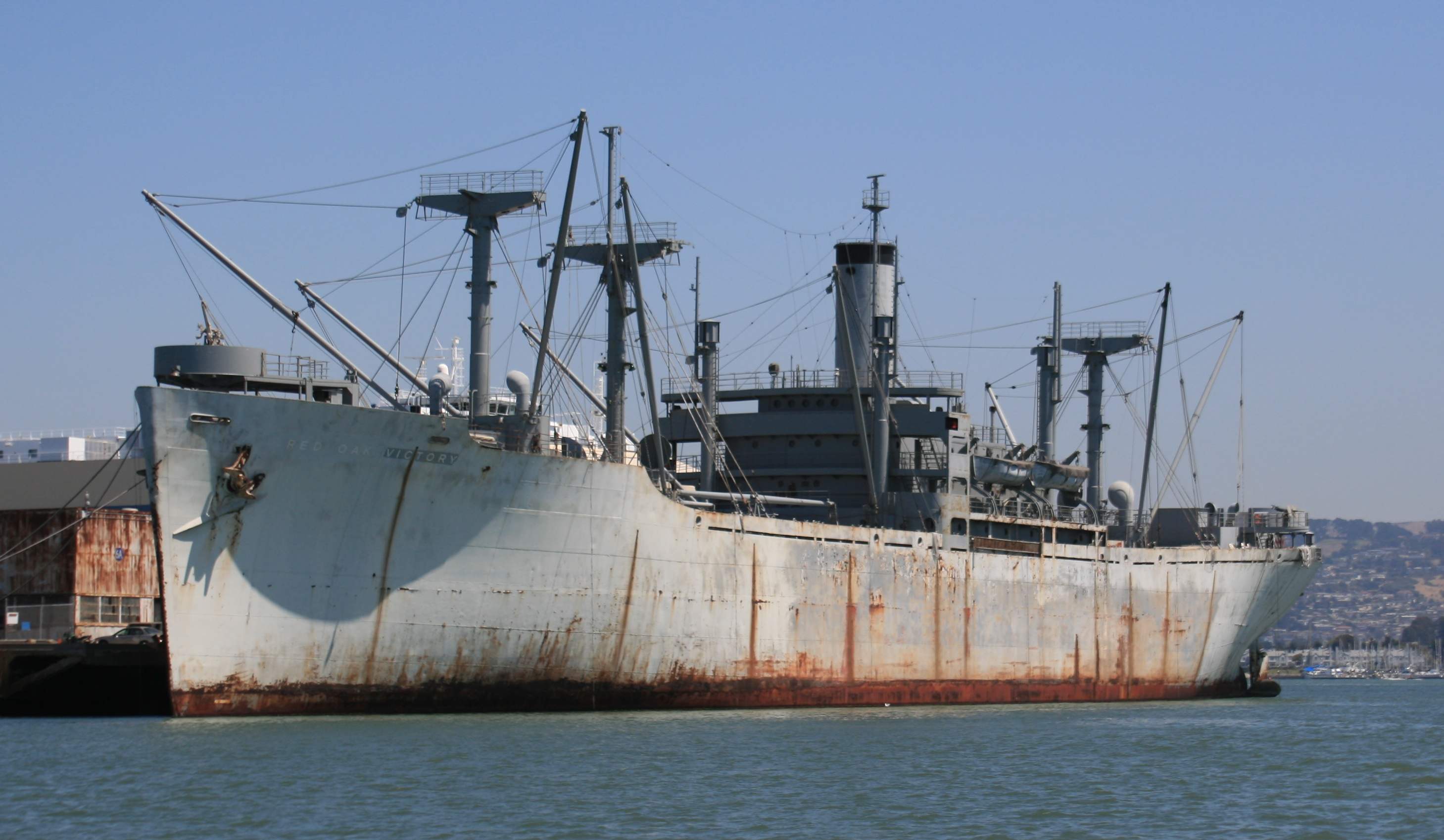
Red Oak Victory

Red Oak Victory was built by Permanente Metals Corporation. Her keel was laid on 9 September 1944. She was launched on 9 November and delivered on 5 December. Built for the United States Navy. To the United States Maritime Commission (USMC) in 1946. Laid up in Suisun Bay. To Luckenbach Steamship Co., Inc. in 1947. Laid up in Suisin Bay in 1948. Returned to service in 1951 due to the Korean War. Laid up at Astoria, Oregon in 1953. Returned to service in 1956. Laid up in Suisun Bay in 1957. Returned to service in 1966 due to the Vietnam War. Operated under the management of American Mail Line. Laid up in Suisin Bay in 1968. Restored as a museum ship in 1998.

== Reed Victory ==
Reed Victory was built by Oregon Shipbuilding Corporation. Her keel was laid on 20 February 1945. She was launched on 3 April and delivered on 28 April. Built for the WSA, she was operated under the management of American President Lines. Sold in 1946 to N.V. Vereenigde Nederlandsche Scheepvaarts Maatschappij, Den Haag, Netherlands and renamed Gaasterkerk. She was scrapped at Whampoa Dock, Hong Kong in August 1970.

== Rensselaer Victory ==
Rensselaer Victory was a troop transport built by California Shipbuilding Corporation. Her keel was laid on 22 December 1944. She was launched on 16 February 1945 and delivered on 15 March. Built for the WSA, she was operated under the management of Matson Navigation Co. Sold in 1946 to N.V. Vereenigde Nederlandsche Scheepvaarts Maatschappij and renamed Molenkerk. Sold in 1962 to Waywiser Navigation Co., Taiwan and renamed Hwa-Lee. Renamed Harriet Victory in 1964. She was sold for scrapping at Kaohsiung in 1969, but remained in service. She was scrapped at Kaohsiung in August 1970.

== Renville ==
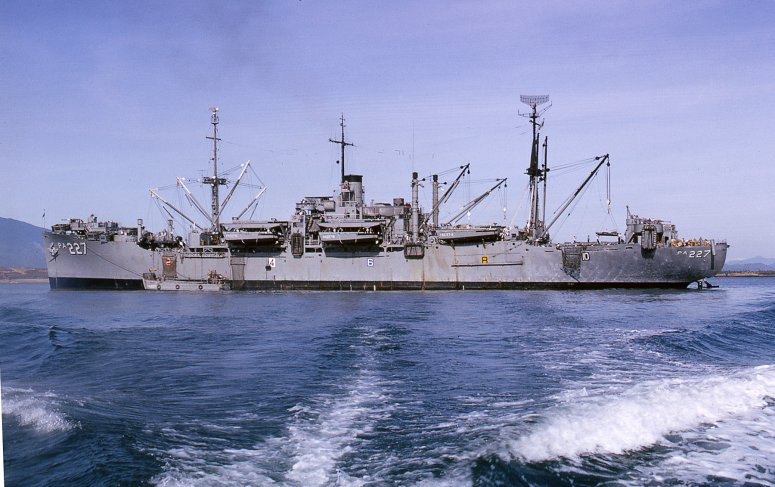
USS Renville

Renville was built by Kaiser Company. Her keel was laid on 19 August 1944. She was launched on 25 October and delivered on 15 November. Built for the United States Navy. Decommissioned at Mare Island Naval Shipyard, Vallejo, California in 1949. Recommissioned in 1952 due to the Korean War. To the United States Maritime Administration in 1968. Laid up in Suisun Bay. She was scrapped in 1982.

== Rice Victory ==
Rice Victory was built by California Shipbuilding Corporation. Her keel was laid on 24 April 1945. She was launched on 16 June and delivered on 12 July. Built for the WSA, she was operated under the management of American President Lines. Laid up in the James River in 1947. She was scrapped at Kaohsiung in 1989.

== Rider Victory ==
Rider Victory was built by California Shipbuilding Corporation. Her keel was laid on 31 January 1945. She was launched on 26 March and delivered on 18 April. Built for the WSA, she was operated under the management of Coastwise Line. Laid up in Suisun Bay in 1948. Returned to service in 1966 due to the Vietnam War. Operated under the management of Alaska Steamship Company. Laid up in Suisun Bay in 1973. She was awaiting disposal in 2009.

== Ripon Victory ==
Ripon Victory was built by Permanente Metals Corporation. Her keel was laid on 25 May 1945. She was launched on 3 July and delivered on 21 August. Built for the WSA, she was operated under the management of Moore-McCormack Lines. Sold in 1947 to China Mutual Steam Navigation Company, Liverpool, United Kingdom and renamed Myrmidon. She was scrapped at Kaohsiung in September 1971.

== Rockbridge ==
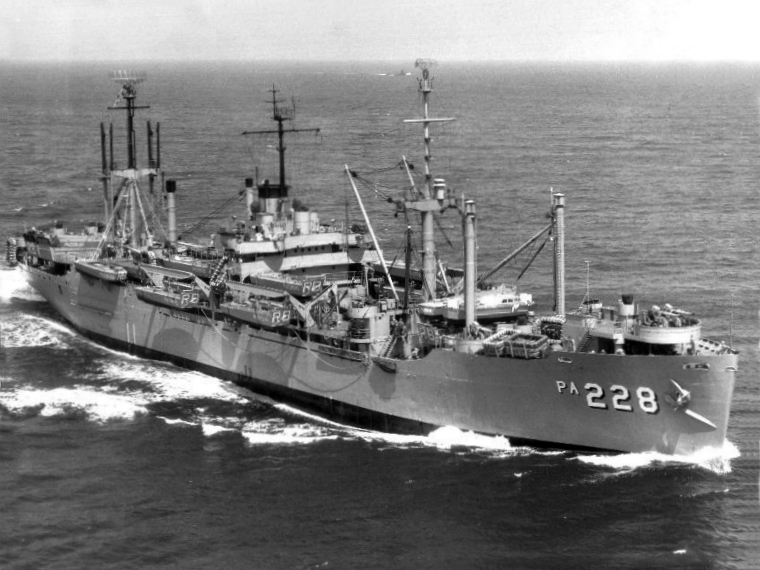
USS Rockbridge

Rockbridge was built by Kaiser Company. Her keel was laid on 2 September 1944. She was launched on 28 October and delivered on 18 November. Built for the United States Navy. Decommissioned in 1947. Recommissioned in 1950 due to the Korean War. Decommissioned in 1958. To United States Maritime Commission in 1969. She was scrapped at Baltimore, Maryland that year.

== Rock Hill Victory ==
Rock Hill Victory was built by Bethlehem Fairfield Shipyard, Baltimore. Her keel was laid on 15 February 1945. She was launched on 6 April and delivered on 2 May. Built for the WSA, she was operated under the management of United States Navigation Company. Laid up in the James River in 1946. Sold in 1947 to Compania Argentina de Navigation Dodero, Buenos Aires, Argentina and renamed Entre Rios. Sold in 1949 to Flota Argentina de Navigation de Ultramar, Buenos Aires. Rebuilt in 1957 to include accommodation for passengers. Sold in 1961 to Empresa Lineas Maritimas, Buenos Aires. She was scrapped at Campana, Argentina in 1978.

== Rockingham ==
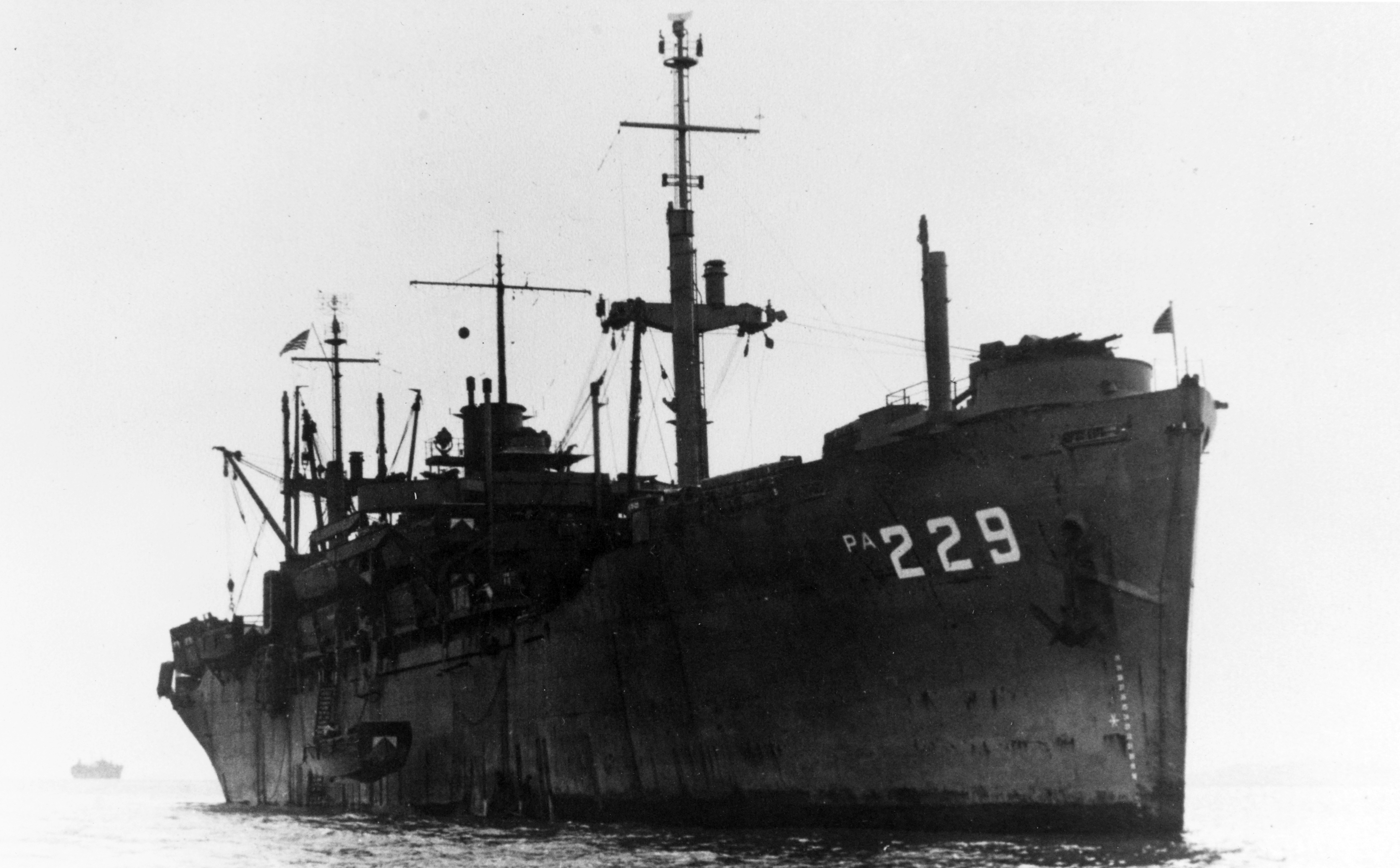
USS Rockingham

Rockingham was built by Kaiser Company. Her keel was laid on 12 September 1944. She was launched on 1 November and delivered on 22 November. Built for the United States Navy. Decommissioned in 1947 and laid up in reserve at San Francisco. To the United States Maritime Administration in 1958. Laid up at Astoria. Later transferred to Suisun Bay. She was scrapped in 1979.

== Rockland Victory ==
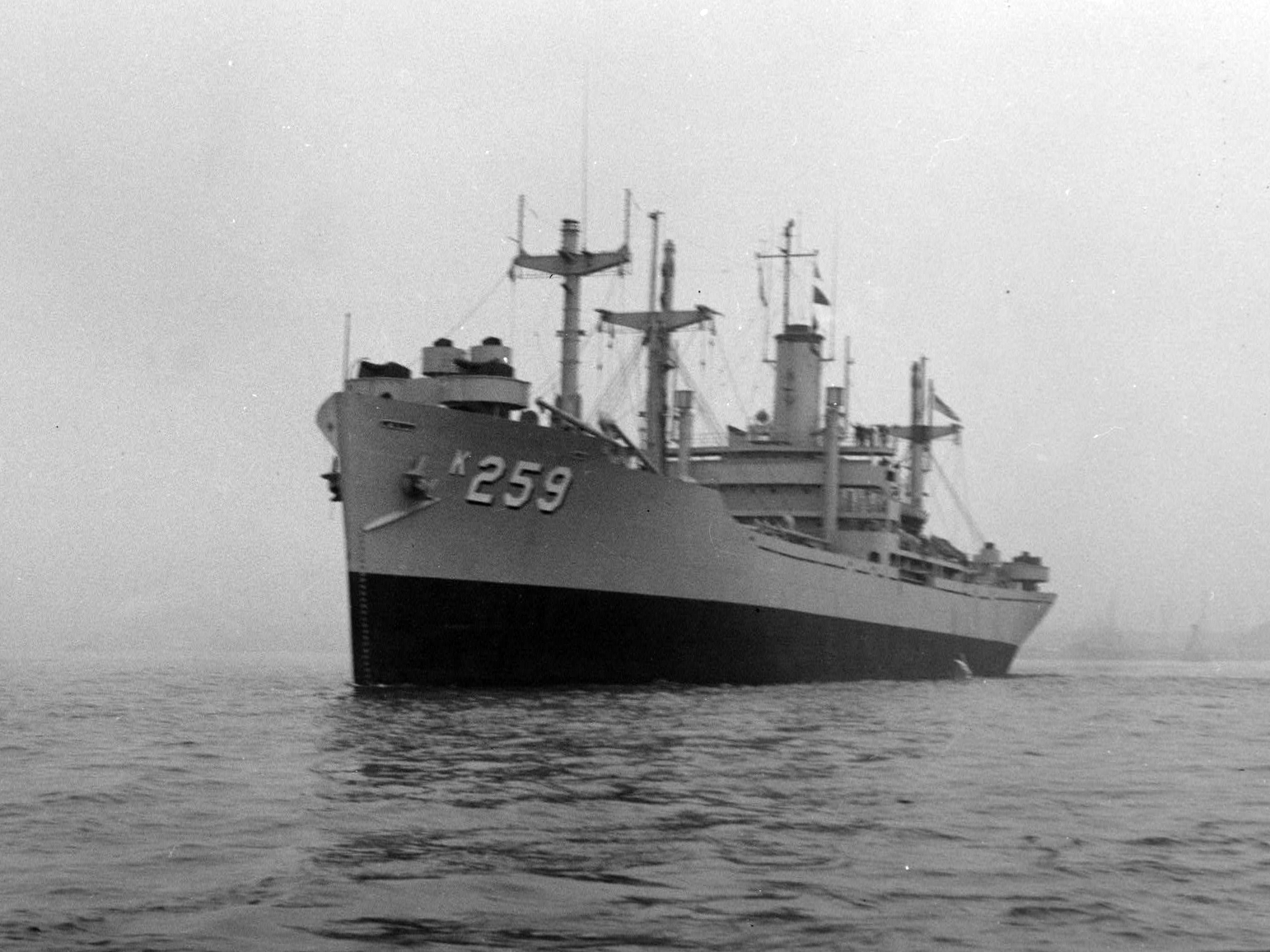
USS Alcor

Rockland Victory was built by Oregon Shipbuilding Corporation. Her keel was laid on 28 February 1944. She was launched on 29 April and delivered on 19 May. Built for the WSA, she was operated under the management of Waterman Steamship Corporation. Laid up at Wilmington, North Carolina in 1948. Later transferred to the James River. To the United States Navy in 1951 and renamed Alcor. She was scrapped at La Spezia, Italy in May 1970.

== Rock Springs Victory ==
Rock Springs Victory was built by Oregon Shipbuilding Corporation. Her keel was laid on 4 December 1944. She was launched on 12 January 1945 and delivered on 22 February. Built for the WSA, she was operated under the management of American South African Line. Laid up at Wilmington, North Carolina in 1948. Later transferred to the James River. Sold in 1963 to Peninsular Navigation Corp., New York and renamed Seneca. Sold in 1965 to U.S. Tankers Corp and renamed Express Buffalo. Sold in 1966 to American Sealanes Inc., New York and renamed American Pride. She was scrapped at Kaohsiung in April 1970.

== Rockwall ==
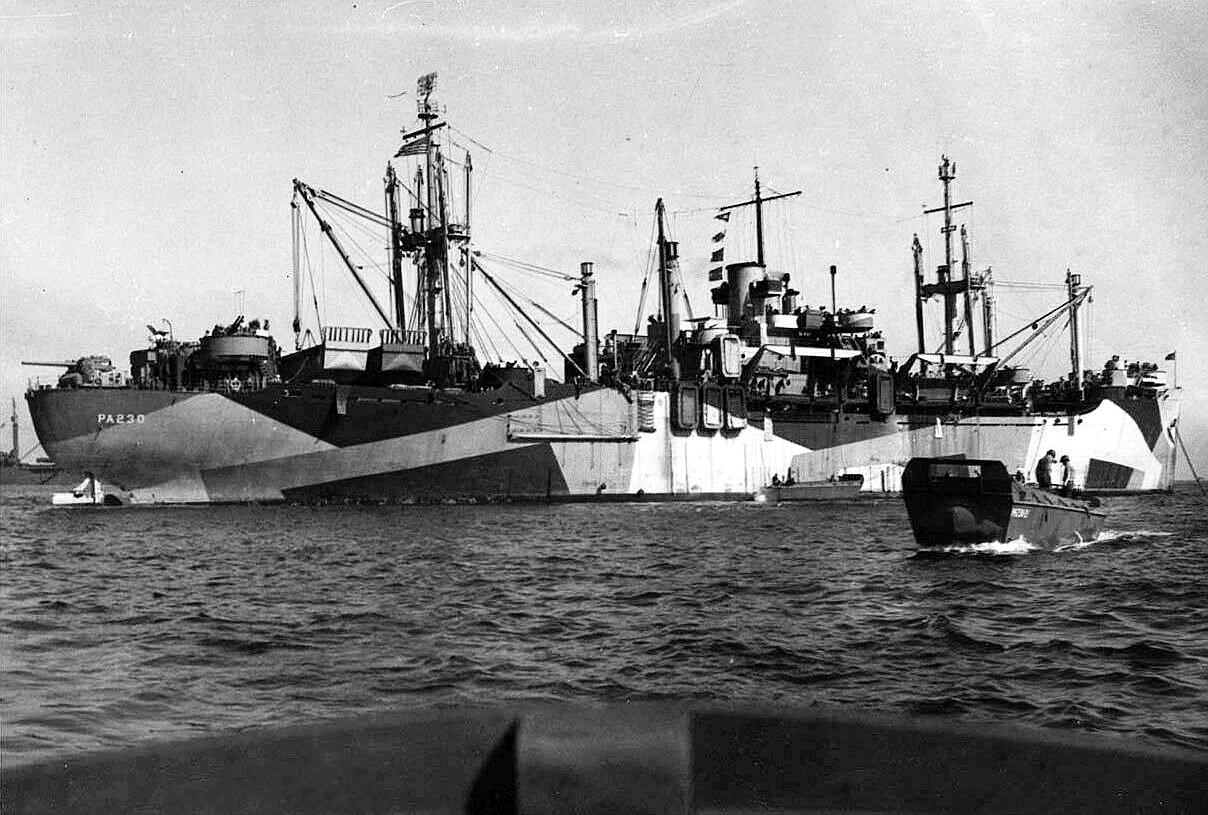
USS Rockwall

Rockwall was built by Kaiser Company. Her keel was laid on 9 September 1944. She was launched on 5 November and delivered on 26 November. Built for the United States Navy. Decommissioned in 1947. Recommissioned in 1951 due to the Korean War. Decommissioned in 1955. To the United States Maritime Commission in 1959. Laid up in the James River. She was scrapped in Spain in 1986.

== Rollins Victory ==
Rollins Victory was a troop transport built by Bethlehem Fairfield Shipyard. Her keel was laid on 17 May 1945. She was launched on 2 July and delivered on 31 July. Built for the WSA, she was operated under the management of North Atlantic & Gulf Steamship Company. Laid up in the James River in 1946. Sold in 1947 to Compania Argentina de Navigation de Ultramar, Buenos Aires and renamed Patagonia Victory. Sold in 1948 to Holland Amerika Lijn and renamed Arendsdijk. Renamed Arendsdyk in 1954. Sold in 1961 to International Export Lines, Nassau, Bahamas and renamed Hongkong Exporter. She was scrapped at Kaohsiung in July 1972.

== Roswell Victory ==
Roswell Victory was built by California Shipbuilding Corporation. Her keel was laid on 19 May 1945. She was launched on 17 July and delivered on 25 August. Built for the WSA, she was operated under the management of Burns Steamship Company. Laid up at Wilmington, North Carolina in 1948. Later transferred to the James River. She was scrapped at Kaohsiung in 1988.

== Rushville Victory ==
Rushville Victory was a troop transport built by Bethlehem Fairfield Shipyard. Her keel was laid on 3 March 1945. She was launched on 24 April and delivered on 22 May. Built for the WSA, she was operated under the management of Dichmann, Wright & Pugh, Inc. Laid up in the James River in 1946. Sold in 1947 to A/S Det Ostasiatiske Kompagni, Copenhagen, Denmar and renamed Nikobar. Sold in 1954 to Deniz Nikilyati, Istanbul, Turkey and renamed Aydin. Sold in 1955 to D. B. Deniz Nakliyati T.A.S., Istanbul. She collided with the French ship Charles Tellier in the Scheldt on 11 February 1958 and sank. Aydin was on a voyage from Antwerp, Belgium to Istanbul. Salvage was abandoned in March and she was abandoned as a total loss.

== Rutgers Victory ==
Rutgers Victory was built by California Shipbuilding Corporation. Her keel was laid on 12 December 1944. She was launched on 2 February 1945 and delivered on 5 March. Built for the WSA, she was operated under the management of Burns Steamship Company. Laid up at Astoria in 1949. Later transferred to the James River. She was scrapped at Castellón de la Plana, Spain in 1985.

== Rutland ==
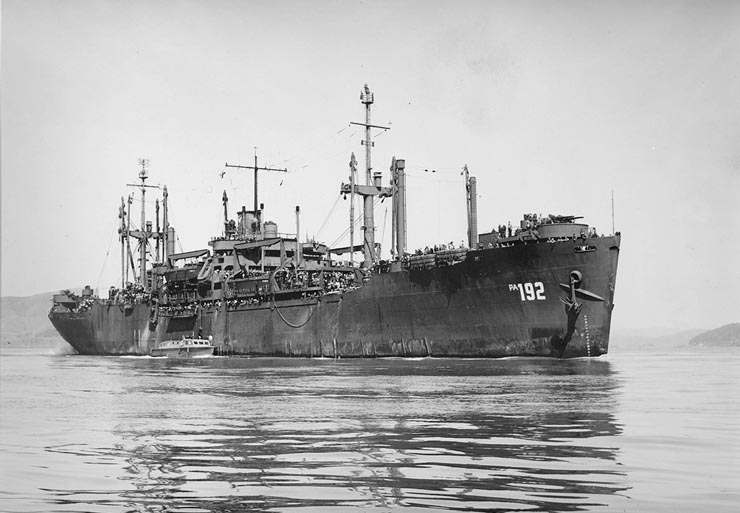
USS Rutland

Rutland was built by Kaiser Company. Her keel was laid on 4 May 1944. She was launched on 10 August and delivered on 29 September. Built for the United States Navy. Decommissioned in 1946 and laid up in reserve at Norfolk, Virginia. To the United States Maritime Administration in 1959. Laid up in the James River. She was scrapped in 1982.

== Rutland Victory ==
Rutland Victory was built by Oregon Shipbuilding Corporation. Her keel was laid on 20 March 1944. She was launched on 9 May and delivered on 29 May. Built for the WSA, she was operated under the management of United States Lines. Sold in 1948 to American President Lines and renamed President Fillimore. Sold in 1962 to Victory Shipping Enterprises, Wilmington, Delaware and renamed Smith Victory. Renamed U.S. Victory in 1965. Sold in 1967 to AEC Shipping Corp., Wilmington, Delaware. Sold in 1969 to Transpacific Container Services, Liberia and renamed Oriental Arrow. Converted to a container ship, now 7,511 GRT. Sold in 1972 to Universal Enterprise Inc., Liberia and renamed Oriental Ace. She sprang a leak and sank in the Pacific Ocean (32°05′N 152°43′E) on 13 February 1976.
