= USS Hidalgo =

Cargo ship of the United States Navy

History

United States
- Name: Hidalgo
- Namesake: Hidalgo County, New Mexico, and; Hidalgo County, Texas
- Ordered: as type (C1-M-AV1) hull, MC hull 2120
- Builder: Walter Butler Shipbuilders, Inc., Superior, Wisconsin
- Yard number: 38
- Laid down: date unknown
- Launched: 28 July 1944
- Sponsored by: Mrs. Claude Pepper
- Commissioned: 4 August 1945
- Decommissioned: 26 April 1946
- Stricken: 8 May 1946
- Identification: Hull symbol: AK-189; Code letters: NENR
- Fate: Sold in 25 February 1947

Turkey
- Name: Rize
- Namesake: Rize Province
- Owner: Deniz Nakliyati T.A.O., Turkey
- Acquired: 25 February 1947
- Home port: Istanbul, Turkey
- Identification: IMO number: 5297311
- Fate: Scrapped in August 1982 at Aliağa, Turkey

General characteristics
- Class & type: Alamosa-class cargo ship
- Type: C1-M-AV1
- Tonnage: 5,032 long tons deadweight (DWT)
- Displacement: 2,382 long tons (2,420 t) (standard); 7,450 long tons (7,570 t) (full load)
- Length: 388 ft 8 in (118.47 m)
- Beam: 50 ft (15 m)
- Draft: 21 ft 1 in (6.43 m)
- Installed power: 1 × Nordberg, TSM 6 diesel engine; 1,750 shp (1,300 kW)
- Propulsion: 1 × propeller
- Speed: 11.5 kn (21.3 km/h; 13.2 mph)
- Capacity: 3,945 t (3,883 long tons) DWT; 9,830 cu ft (278 m^{3}) (refrigerated); 227,730 cu ft (6,449 m^{3}) (non-refrigerated)
- Complement: 15 Officers; 70 Enlisted
- Armament: 1 × 3 in (76 mm)/50 caliber dual purpose gun (DP); 6 × 20 mm (0.8 in) Oerlikon anti-aircraft (AA) cannons

USS Hidalgo (AK-189) was an Alamosa-class cargo ship that was constructed for the U.S. Navy during the closing period of World War II. She was declared excess-to-needs and returned to the U.S. Maritime Commission.

== Construction ==
Hidalgo was a diesel-powered C1-M-AV1 cargo hull, was launched 28 July 1944 under Maritime Commission contract, MC hull 2120, by Walter Butler Shipbuilding, Inc., Superior, Wisconsin, sponsored by Mrs. Claude Pepper, wife of the Senator from Florida; placed in service while being towed to Galveston, Texas, and commissioned 4 August 1945.

== Service history ==
=== World War II Pacific Theatre operations ===
After conducting a brief shakedown cruise off the coast of Texas, Hidalgo sailed to the Panama Canal Zone for routing to the Pacific Ocean 5 September 1945, but the war's end brought orders to proceed to Norfolk, Virginia.

=== Post-war decommissioning ===
The ship arrived in Hampton Roads, Virginia, 11 March 1946 and decommissioned 26 April 1946. Subsequently, she was sold to Turkey for $693,862.00 and serves as cargo ship SS Rize in merchant service.

== Merchant service ==
Hidalgo was renamed Rize in 1947. Along with her sister ships, ex-Antrim, renamed Kars, ex-Craighead, renamed Kastamonu, and ex-Bullock, renamed Edirne, she would, for the next 15 years, provide cargo service between Turkey and Northern Europe. She was finally broken up in the Turkish port of Aliağa in August 1982.

== Honors and awards ==
Qualified Hidalgo personnel were eligible for the following:

- American Campaign Medal
- World War II Victory Medal

== Notes ==
Citations

== Bibliography ==
Online resources

- "Hidalgo (AK-189)". Dictionary of American Naval Fighting Ships. Naval History and Heritage Command. 16 July 2015. This article incorporates text from this source, which is in the public domain.
- "C1 Cargo Ships". www.ShipbuildingHistory.com. 28 August 2009.
- "USS Hidalgo (AK-189)". NavSource. 29 August 2014.
- "Hidalgo". United States Department of Transportation. Archived from the original on March 16, 2016.
