= USS Craighead =

Cargo ship of the United States Navy

History

United States
- Name: Craighead
- Namesake: Craighead County, Arkansas
- Ordered: as type (C1-M-AV1) hull, MC hull 2148
- Builder: Froemming Brothers, Milwaukee, Wisconsin
- Yard number: 20
- Laid down: 1944
- Launched: 28 February 1945
- Sponsored by: Mrs. W. R. Provoost
- Acquired: 31 July 1945
- Commissioned: 5 September 1945
- Decommissioned: 18 January 1946
- Stricken: 7 February 1946
- Identification: Hull symbol: AK-175; Code letters: NEWO
- Fate: Sold, 24 February 1947

Turkey
- Name: Kastamonu
- Namesake: Province of Kastamonu
- Owner: Deniz Nakliyati T.A.O., Turkey
- Acquired: 24 February 1947
- Home port: Istanbul, Turkey
- Identification: IMO number: 5183209
- Fate: Scrapped in January 1984 at Aliağa, Turkey

General characteristics
- Class & type: Alamosa-class cargo ship
- Type: C1-M-AV1
- Tonnage: 5,032 long tons deadweight (DWT)
- Displacement: 2,382 long tons (2,420 t) (standard); 7,450 long tons (7,570 t) (full load)
- Length: 388 ft 8 in (118.47 m)
- Beam: 50 ft (15 m)
- Draft: 21 ft 1 in (6.43 m)
- Installed power: 1 × Nordberg, TSM 6 diesel engine; 1,750 shp (1,300 kW)
- Propulsion: 1 × propeller
- Speed: 11.5 kn (21.3 km/h; 13.2 mph)
- Capacity: 3,945 t (3,883 long tons) DWT; 9,830 cu ft (278 m^{3}) (refrigerated); 227,730 cu ft (6,449 m^{3}) (non-refrigerated)
- Complement: 15 Officers; 70 Enlisted
- Armament: 1 × 3 in (76 mm)/50 caliber dual purpose gun (DP); 6 × 20 mm (0.8 in) Oerlikon anti-aircraft (AA) cannons

USS Craighead (AK-175) was an Alamosa-class cargo ship commissioned by the U.S. Navy for service in World War II. She was responsible for delivering troops, goods and equipment to locations in the war zone.

== Construction ==
Craighead was launched 28 February 1945, by Froemming Brothers, Inc., Milwaukee, Wisconsin, under a Maritime Commission contract, MC hull 2148; sponsored by Mrs. W. R. Provoost; transferred to the Navy 31 July 1945; and commissioned 5 September 1945.

== Service history ==
=== Post-World War II activity ===
Craighead sailed from Galveston, Texas, 25 September 1945 and arrived at Davisville, Rhode Island, 4 October to load cargo for construction battalions on the US West Coast. She sailed from Davisville 25 October, arriving at San Pedro, California, 15 November. After sailing on cargo duty between Port Hueneme, San Pedro, and San Francisco, California, she sailed 14 December 1945 for Norfolk, Virginia, where she arrived 5 January 1946.

=== Post-war decommissioning ===
Craighead was decommissioned 18 January 1946 and returned to the Maritime Commission the same day for disposal.

== Merchant service ==
Craighead was sold to the Republic of Turkey in 1947, for $693,862. She was transferred to the shipping company of Deniz Nakliyati T.A.O., Istanbul, Turkey, and renamed Kastamonu and reflagged to Turkish. Along with her sister ships, ex-Antrim, renamed Kars, ex-Bullock, renamed Malatya, and ex-Hidalgo, renamed Rize, she would, for the next 15 years, provide cargo service between Turkey and Northern Europe. She was finally broken up in the Turkish port of Aliağa in January 1984.

== Notes ==
Citations

== Bibliography ==
Online resources

- "Craighead". Dictionary of American Naval Fighting Ships. Naval History and Heritage Command. This article incorporates text from this source, which is in the public domain.
- "C1 Cargo Ships". www.ShipbuildingHistory.com. 28 August 2009.
- "Craighead (AK-175)". NavSource. 8 November 2013.
- "Craighead". United States Department of Transportation. Archived from the original on November 3, 2016.
