= SS Smith Victory =

SS Smith Victory is the name of the following Victory ships:

- SS Smith Victory (1945), wrecked and scrapped in 1968
- SS Smith Victory (1962), launched in 1944 as SS Rutland Victory, sank in 1976
