= USS Bullock =

Cargo ship of the United States Navy

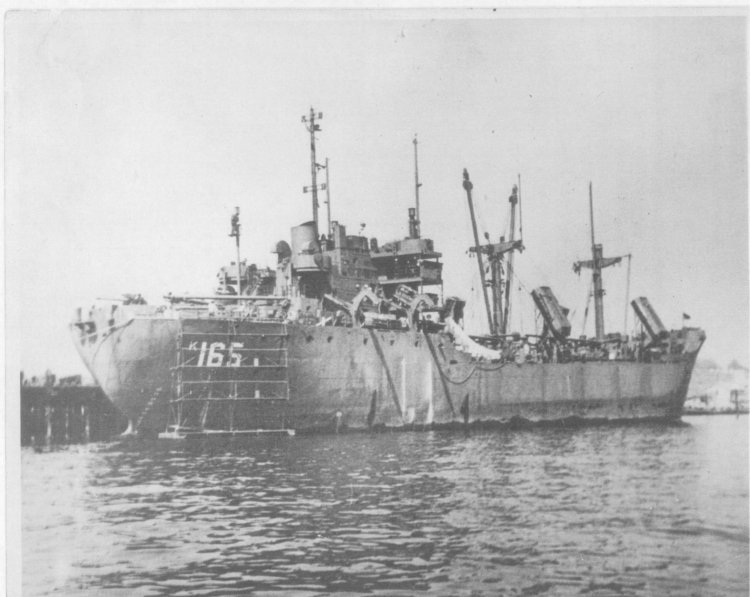
- USS Bullock (AK-165) moored pierside.

History

United States
- Name: Bullcok
- Namesake: Bullock County, Alabama
- Ordered: as type (C1-M-AV1) hull, MC hull 2110
- Builder: Kaiser Shipbuilding Co., Richmond, California
- Yard number: 67
- Laid down: 26 September 1944
- Launched: 2 December 1944
- Sponsored by: Mrs. J. L. Barker
- Acquired: 2 March 1945
- Commissioned: 2 March 1945
- Decommissioned: 13 March 1946
- Stricken: 28 March 1946
- Identification: Hull symbol: AK-165; Code letters: NEVH
- Fate: Sold 20 January 1947

Turkey
- Name: Edirne (1947–1948); Adana (1948); Malatya (1948–1983)
- Namesake: Province of Edirne; Province of Adana; Province of Malatya
- Owner: Deniz Nakliyati T.A.O., Turkey
- Acquired: 18 February 1947
- Home port: Istanbul, Turkey
- Identification: IMO number: 5218212
- Fate: Scrapped in January 1982 at Aliağa, Turkey

General characteristics
- Class & type: Alamosa-class cargo ship
- Type: C1-M-AV1
- Tonnage: 5,032 long tons deadweight (DWT)
- Displacement: 2,382 long tons (2,420 t) (standard); 7,450 long tons (7,570 t) (full load)
- Length: 388 ft 8 in (118.47 m)
- Beam: 50 ft (15 m)
- Draft: 21 ft 1 in (6.43 m)
- Installed power: 1 × Nordberg, TSM 6 diesel engine; 1,750 shp (1,300 kW)
- Propulsion: 1 × propeller
- Speed: 11.5 kn (21.3 km/h; 13.2 mph)
- Capacity: 3,945 t (3,883 long tons) DWT; 9,830 cu ft (278 m^{3}) (refrigerated); 227,730 cu ft (6,449 m^{3}) (non-refrigerated)
- Complement: 15 Officers; 70 Enlisted
- Armament: 1 × 3 in (76 mm)/50 caliber dual purpose gun (DP); 6 × 20 mm (0.8 in) Oerlikon anti-aircraft (AA) cannons

USS Bullock (AK-165) was an Alamosa-class cargo ship commissioned by the U.S. Navy for service in World War II. She was responsible for delivering troops, goods and equipment to locations in the war zone.

== Construction ==
Bullock was laid down under a Maritime Commission contract, MC hull 2110, on 26 September 1944, at Richmond, California, by Kaiser Cargo, Inc.; launched on 2 December 1944; sponsored by Mrs. J. L. Barker; acquired by the Navy on 2 March 1945; and commissioned that same day.

== Service history ==
=== World War II Pacific Theatre operations ===
After a brief fitting out period at Oakland, California, the new cargo ship, with its inexperienced crew, got underway on 19 March 1945 for a shakedown cruise. Trial runs, tests of operating gear, and a full-scale battle problem pointed out deficiencies in both ship and crew that received intensive work during the succeeding weeks. Bullock returned to San Francisco, California, on 12 April and loaded hull and engine spares, radio and radar gear, and frozen and chilled provisions to carry to the Admiralty Islands and the Philippine Islands. Bullock departed San Francisco on 20 April and headed for Manus where she arrived 23 days later.

=== Operating in "rear areas" ===
Between 13 May and 14 December, Bullock ferried military passengers and cargo between Manus, the Philippines, the Netherlands East Indies, and New Guinea. Having entered the war late and consigned to rear areas, the cargo ship never faced an enemy air or surface attack, although, while underway, she still steered zigzag courses and held battle drills because the threat of submarine attack, remote though it was, still existed. Bullock's mission did not change with the cessation of hostilities in August. She continued to transport supplies until 14 December, when she weighed anchor at Manila Bay and headed for the United States.

=== Post-war decommissioning ===
Bullock transited the Panama Canal on 28 January 1946 and reported to the Atlantic Fleet for duty. She arrived in Norfolk, Virginia, on 8 February, but received orders to Baltimore, Maryland, to be decommissioned. Bullock was decommissioned and returned to the Maritime Commission on 13 March 1946, and her name was struck from the Navy list on 28 March 1946. She was purchased by Dichmann, Wright & Pugh, Inc. in January 1947 for the Turkish government, for whom she began operation in 1947 under the name Edirne.

== Turkish service ==
Bullock went through several name changes in 1947 and 1948. She was renamed Edirne in 1947, then Adana in 1948, and then again in 1948 she was renamed Malatya. Along with her sister ships, ex-Antrim, renamed Kars, ex-Craighead, renamed Kastamonu, and ex-Hidalgo, renamed Rize, she would, for the next 15 years, provide cargo service between Turkey and Northern Europe. She was finally broken up in the Turkish port of Aliağa in December 1982.

== Military awards and honors ==
The record does not indicate any battle stars for Bullock. However, her crew was eligible for the following medals:

- American Campaign Medal
- Asiatic-Pacific Campaign Medal
- World War II Victory Medal
- Philippines Liberation Medal

== Notes ==
Citations

== Bibliography ==
Online resources

- Walker, Mary P. (23 November 2005). "Bullock". Dictionary of American Naval Fighting Ships. Naval History and Heritage Command. This article incorporates text from this source, which is in the public domain.
- "C1 Cargo Ships". www.ShipbuildingHistory.com. 28 August 2009.
- "USS Bullock (AK-165)". NavSource. 18 July 2014.
- "Bullock". United States Department of Transportation. Archived from the original on November 3, 2016.
