= Charles Beightler =

United States Navy officer

Charles S. Beightler
- Born: Charles Sprague Beightler; January 12, 1898; Marysville, Ohio, US
- Died: August 19, 1982 (aged 84); El Cajon, California, US
- Military career
- Allegiance: United States
- Branch: United States Navy
- Rank: Rear Admiral
- Awards: Bronze Star

Charles Sprague Beightler (January 12, 1898 – August 19, 1982) served in the United States Navy, commanding vessels during World War II in the Pacific, and ultimately achieving the rank of rear admiral.

== Early life ==
Beightler was born in Marysville, Ohio, the son of William P. Beightler, President of the Perfect Cigar Company, and Joana Sprague, daughter of Franklin B. Sprague. His brothers were Robert S. Beightler and Donald, father of Dr. Charles S. Beightler.

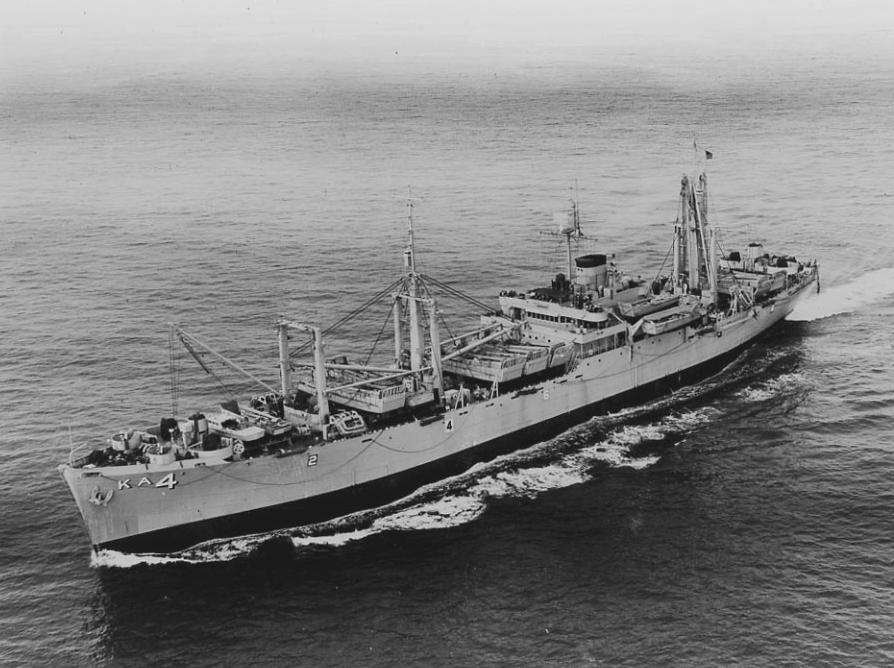
Beightler commanded the USS Electra in the Pacific Theater from June 1943 to September 1944.

== College and military ==
In 1916, he enrolled at the Ohio State University and was a member of the freshmen basketball squad and Alpha Sigma fraternity. Later that year he left the university and enrolled at the United States Naval Academy in Annapolis. He would graduate with the class of 1920 having achieved the rank of Midshipmen.

By 1924 he was a Lieutenant instructing on the USS Farquhar in Florida, and by 1926 he training at the Great Lakes Station.

== World War II ==
During World War II, he would command the USS Electra from June 23, 1943, to September 20, 1944, and USS Rawlins from November 11, 1944, to April 1, 1946, in the Pacific Theater, earning a Bronze Star for extraordinary achievement.

== Personal life ==
He was married to Bonita Pennicke, a United States Naval Nurse. He died on August 19, 1982, in El Cajon, California, and is interred at Arlington National Cemetery.
