= USS Zebra =

Cargo ship of the United States Navy

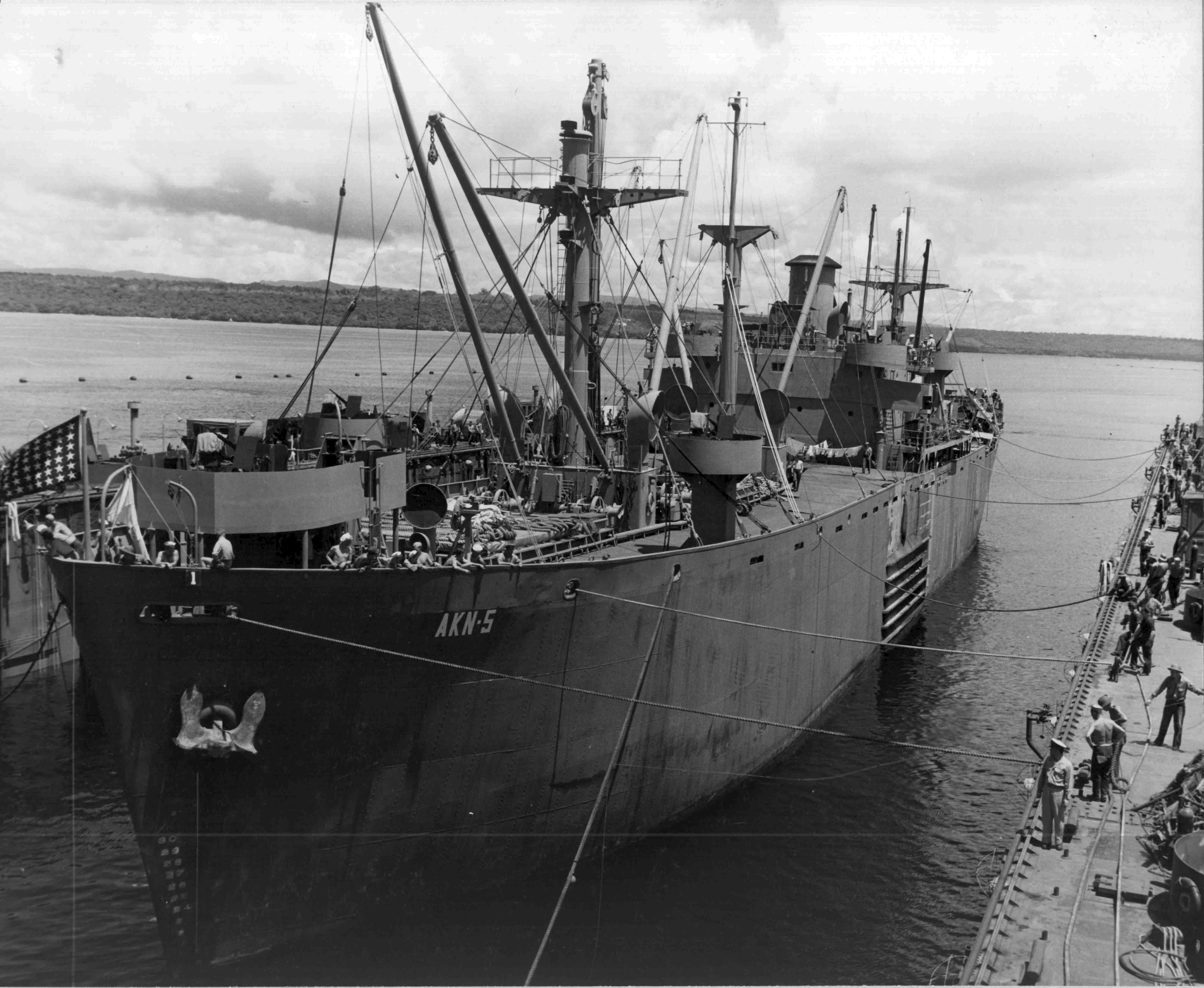
- USS Zebra (AKN-5) departing a floating drydock at Espiritu Santo, New Hebrides Islands, after total rehabilitation to operable status, 29 February 1944, two days after being commissioned AKN-5.

History

United States
- Name: Matthew Lyon; Zebra
- Namesake: Matthew Lyon; The zebra
- Builder: Permanente Metals Corporation, Richmond, California
- Laid down: 18 March 1943
- Launched: 11 April 1943
- Acquired: 1 October 1943
- Commissioned: 27 February 1944
- Decommissioned: 21 January 1946
- Reclassified: IX-107, 1 October 1943; AKN-5, 27 February 1944
- Stricken: 7 February 1946
- Identification: ON 243284 (Matthew Lyon)
- Honors and awards: 1 battle star (World War II)
- Fate: Awarded to Union Minerals & Alloys Corporation for scrapping on 28 March 1972 for $35,621.54.

General characteristics
- Class & type: Indus-class net cargo ship
- Displacement: 14,350 long tons (14,580 t) full
- Length: 441 ft 6 in (134.57 m)
- Beam: 56 ft 11 in (17.35 m)
- Draft: 28 ft 4 in (8.64 m)
- Speed: 12.5 knots (23.2 km/h; 14.4 mph)
- Complement: 228 officers and enlisted
- Armament: 1 × 5 in (130 mm) gun; 4 × 40 mm guns

USS Zebra (AKN-5) was an Indus-class net cargo ship (Note: Indus (AKN-1) was converted shortly after completion as a net cargo ship as were Sagittarius (AKN-2) and Tuscana (AKN-3). The other AKNs were conversions from other hull types.) in the service of the United States Navy in World War II. The ship was originally the Matthew Lyon, an EC2-S-C1 Liberty ship, operated for the War Shipping Administration (WSA) as a cargo vessel by an agent until severely damaged by torpedo in August 1943. While at Espiritu Santo in the New Hebrides awaiting likely scrapping the Navy acquired the vessel under bareboat charter to be used as a net cargo ship transporting reclaimed anti-submarine netting.

After repairs the ship was placed in service under the name Zebra, designated IX-107, in October. After success in the role the ship underwent conversion and was commissioned USS Zebra designated AKN-5, one of six net cargo ships and one of four Liberty conversions to that role.

== Construction ==
Zebra was laid down 18 March 1943 as the Liberty ship Matthew Lyon (MCE hull 535), a basic EC2-S-C1 type Liberty, by Permanente Metals Corporation, Richmond No. 1 Yard, Richmond, California, under a Maritime Commission contract. The keel was laid 18 March 1943, launch on 11 April 1943 sponsored by Mrs. Harry H. Feldhahn and delivery to the War Shipping Administration (WSA) on 26 April 1943.

== Merchant service history ==
Operated for the WSA by a civilian contractor, Dichmann, Wright & Pugh, Inc., the ship plied the waters of the Pacific during the summer of 1943. On 12 August, while voyaging to Espiritu Santo in the New Hebrides, she received severe damage as the result of a torpedo fired by I-11. The ship reached port under her own power with one of her 41 merchant sailors and 18-man Naval Armed Guard injured. At Espiritu Santo the ship languished in Segond Channel for several weeks, apparently headed for scrapping.

== Service history ==
Late in September, a naval officer recognized her potential for emergency service as a net cargo ship; and, on 1 October 1943, she was acquired under bareboat agreement from WSA and placed in service as Zebra (IX-107). It was the only ship of the Navy to bear this name. Her subsequent success in that role prompted her complete conversion to a net cargo ship and her total rehabilitation to operable status. On 15 February 1944, redesignated AKN-5, Zebra was placed in commission on 27 February 1944, while in drydock at Espiritu Santo. The ship was one of six ships and one of four Liberty types converted to net transports.

=== Salvaging net gear, 1944 ===
During the first three months of her commissioned service, Zebra remained at Espiritu Santo, completing her partial conversion to a net cargo ship. She began her first mission on 1 June, when she started loading a cargo of reclaimed net material and put to sea on 8 June, bound for New Caledonia. The ship arrived in Nouméa, on 11 June, unloaded her net material, and took on a general cargo destined for the Fiji Islands. She departed Nouméa, on 19 June, arrived at Suva, three days later, unloaded, and began taking on reclaimed net material. On 27 June, she moved to the other side of the island where she began loading material salvaged from the Nandi net installations. The ship completed loading on 5 July, and headed back to New Caledonia, that same day. Zebra entered Nouméa, on 8 July, and discharged her load of salvaged net gear. Following 10 days at Nouméa, the net cargo ship embarked upon a circuit of various South Pacific islands to collect nets and equipment salvaged from the harbor defense installations. Through the remainder of the summer, the ship visited Tongatapu; Bora Bora; Tutuila and Upolu, Samoa; and Funafuti. At each island, she stopped long enough to unload part of the general cargo she had taken on at Nouméa, and pick up each installation's salvaged net gear. She departed her last port of call on that voyage, Funafuti, in the Ellice Islands, on 23 August, and returned to Nouméa, five days later.

=== Palau Islands ===
Zebra remained at Nouméa, until 15 September. On that day, she embarked upon a voyage which took her closer to war and which brought her first actual net-laying mission. The ship arrived in Eniwetok Lagoon, on 24 September, and remained there until 3 October, when she continued on toward the Western Carolines. Reaching Ulithi Atoll, on 8 October, the net cargo ship immediately began installing net gear around the anchorage with two of her sister ships, Sagittarius (AKN-2) and Tuscana (AKN-3). They completed their mission by 10 November, and Zebra loaded the unused net material for transportation to the Palaus. She departed Ulithi, that same day, and entered Barnum Bay, near Peleliu, two days later. While the fighting on Peleliu continued, the net cargo ship assembled a net installation for the protection of a wharf about to be constructed at the island. She concluded that portion of her mission on 14 November, and headed north in company with two net tenders to the anchorage at Kossol Roads. There, she spent 11 days assembling over two miles of net and supporting equipment. At the conclusion of that assignment, Zebra received orders to Pearl Harbor. She departed the Palaus, on 25 November, stopped at Eniwetok, briefly on 4 December, and arrived in Hawaii, on 15 December. At Pearl Harbor, she underwent 20 days of repairs and modifications before loading net gear in preparation for her next mission.

=== Iwo Jima, 1945 ===
She remained at Pearl Harbor, through the end of January 1945, awaiting sailing orders. Finally, the ship got underway on 5 February, bound for Iwo Jima. She stopped at Eniwetok, between 16 February and 21 February, and then continued her voyage. Two days out of Eniwetok, Zebra's convoy received orders changing its destination from Iwo Jima, to Saipan, in the Marianas. Zebra, two net tenders, and a destroyer, however, received instructions to continue on to their original destination as a result of battle damage to her sister ship Keokuk (AKN-4). The little task unit arrived off Iwo Jima, on 28 February, and Zebra immediately began double duty, laying nets and serving as flagship for all minecraft in the vicinity. She stayed at Iwo Jima for 42 days, laying nets in spite of adverse weather, heavy seas, and fire from the enemy garrison. She also superintended the laying of ship moorings and performed several salvage jobs including pulling Zuni (ATF-95) and LST-727 off the Iwo Jima beach.

=== California ===
Zebra concluded her tour of duty at Iwo Jima, on 11 April, and shaped a course back to Eniwetok, where she arrived on 18 April. Continuing east, the ship entered Pearl Harbor, on 28 April, for a four-day layover before resuming her voyage to the West Coast. On 11 May, the net cargo ship arrived in San Francisco, California, to complete her conversion to a net cargo ship. She entered the Oakland yard of the Moore Dry Dock Company on 14 May. Work continued until mid-July when she received orders to participate in net laying experiments at Tiburon, California. Though speeded up, her conversion had not been completed when she slipped her moorings on 25 July, to join the operations up the bay at Tiburon. That duty lasted until 3 August, at which time the ship returned to Moore Drydock Co. to complete the remaining conversion work. On 26 August, she made her post-conversion, full power trial run and, soon thereafter, received orders assigning her to the Administrative Command, Minecraft, located at Pearl Harbor.

=== Post-war activities, 1945–1946 ===
The ship stood out of San Francisco Bay, on 31 August, and arrived in Pearl Harbor, on 8 September. She remained in Hawaii only 12 days. On 20 September, she headed back to the western Pacific to collect salvaged net equipment. Carrying a small cargo of mine gear for the Marshall Islands command, she steamed to Kwajalein, where she arrived on 30 September, and unloaded her cargo before proceeding on to Iwo Jima. Zebra arrived at the latter island on 9 October, loaded net gear, and then headed for the Marianas, on 29 October. The ship made port at Saipan, on 1 November, unloaded the salvaged net equipment at the Saipan stockpile, and began loading passengers and equipment for return to the United States.

She departed Saipan, on 15 November, and stopped at Guam, on 16 November. There, she unloaded some mine-sweeping gear before resuming the voyage on 29 November. Steaming by way of Pearl Harbor, Zebra arrived at Pear Harbor, on 11 December, and departed on 13 December, for the Canal Zone, arriving there on 31 December 1945. Routed on to Norfolk, Virginia, she reported to the Commandant, 5th Naval District, on 8 January 1946.

== Decommissioning ==
Zebra was decommissioned at Norfolk on 21 January 1946, and simultaneously returned to the War Shipping Administration. Her name was struck from the Navy List on 7 February 1946. Zebra was awarded one battle star for service during World War II. On 21 January 1946, the ship was laid up at Lee Hall, Virginia, with her name reverted to Matthew Lyon, was under the reserve fleet repair program in the James River fleet during the mid-1950s, then awarded to Union Minerals & Alloys Corporation for scrapping on 28 March 1972, for $35,621.54.

== Bibliography ==
- Clancey, Patrick (26 January 2004). "Ships of the U.S. Navy, 1940-1945 — AKN—Net Cargo Ships". HyperWar Foundation.
- Colton, Tim (October 13, 2010). "Kaiser Permanente No. 1, Richmond CA". ShipbuildingHistory.
- Cressman, Robert J. (1999). "The Official Chronology of the U.S. Navy in World War II". Contemporary History Branch, Naval Historical Center (now Naval History & Heritage Command).
- Maritime Administration. "MATTHEW LYON". Ship History Database Vessel Status Card. Maritime Administration. Archived from the original on December 12, 2019.
- Naval History And Heritage Command. "Zebra". Dictionary of American Naval Fighting Ships. Naval History And Heritage Command. This article incorporates text from this source, which is in the public domain.
- Sayers, Ken W. (2019). U.S. Navy Auxiliary Vessels: A History and Directory from World War I to Today. Jefferson, North Carolina: McFarland & Company, Inc. ISBN 9781476672564. LCCN 2019013656.
