= USS Rockwall =

Haskell-class attack transport ship

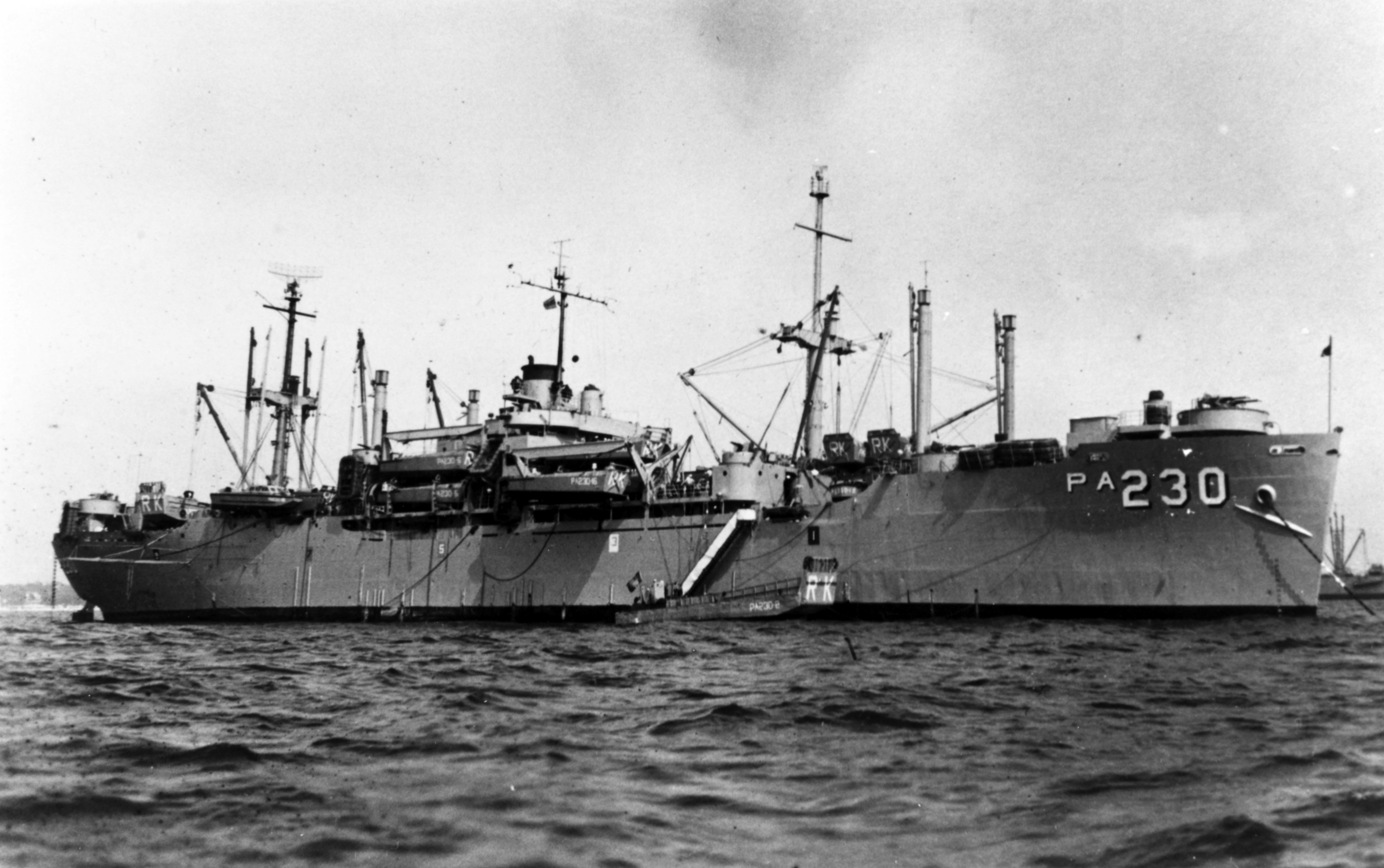

History

United States
- Name: USS Rockwall (APA-230)
- Namesake: Rockwall County, Texas
- Builder: Kaiser Shipbuilding
- Laid down: 9 September 1944
- Launched: 5 November 1944
- Acquired: 14 January 1945
- Commissioned: 14 January 1945
- Decommissioned: 28 September 1955
- Stricken: 1 December 1958
- Honours and awards: One battle star for World War II
- Fate: Disposed of 1 August 1983, fate unknown

General characteristics
- Class & type: Haskell-class attack transport
- Displacement: 6,873 tons (lt), 14,837 t. (fl)
- Length: 455 ft
- Beam: 62 ft
- Draft: 24 ft
- Propulsion: 1 x Westinghouse geared turbine, 2 x Combustion Engineering header-type boilers, 1 x propeller, designed shaft horsepower 8,500
- Speed: 18 knots
- Boats & landing craft carried: 2 x LCM, 12 x LCVP, 3 x LCPU
- Capacity: 86 Officers 1,475 enlisted
- Crew: 56 Officers, 480 enlisted
- Armament: 1 x 5"/38 caliber dual-purpose gun mount, 1 x quad 40mm gun mount, 4 x twin 40mm gun mounts, 10 x single 20mm gun mounts
- Notes: MCV Hull No. 676, hull type VC2-S-AP5

USS Rockwall (APA-230) was a Haskell-class attack transport that served in the United States Navy from 1945 to 1947 and from 1951 to 1955. She was scrapped in 1984.

== History ==
Rockwall was named after Rockwall County, Texas. She was laid down for the United States Maritime Commission on 9 September 1944 by Kaiser Shipbuilding of Vancouver, Washington; launched on 5 November; acquired by the Navy on loan-charter 14 January 1945, and commissioned on the same day at Astoria, Oregon.

=== World War II ===
After shakedown off the California coast, Rockwall sailed for Saipan, where she debarked a Marine Rocket Detachment and a Naval Construction Regiment 12 April. With other attack transports, she practiced amphibious operations and maneuvers off Lanai and Maui, 1–5 May. She then made a hydrographic survey on Palahinu Beach, Lanai, before arriving at Pearl Harbor on 7 May.

She departed on 24 May, with Marines and debarked them at Okinawa 10 June. The next day, Rockwall sailed for Ulithi, and on 18 May, took on board the 5th Military Police Battalion of the U.S. Marines at Guam and carried them to Iwo Jima.

Rockwall began her homeward voyage with officers and enlisted men from Iwo Jima 29 June, picked up further troops at Tinian on 4 July, and arrived at San Francisco on 24 July.

Rockwall carried Army replacements to Manila on 9 September and loaded stores and embarked Army troops at Leyte Gulf on 13 September. She sortied on 18 September with Appalachian, the amphibious force flagship, and a convoy of 24 attack transports and attack cargo ships for Honshū, Japan. The force arrived on 25 September and began unloading.

Rockwall sailed on 29 September for Shanghai, China, joining the destroyer escort Woodson as escort on 4 October and arrived 6 October. She embarked 1,728 passengers on 11 October and arrived at Seattle, Washington on 26 October. Rockwall made two more voyages to the Philippines.

==== Peacetime Operations ====
During the spring of 1946, she took part as a support vessel in Operation Crossroads, the atomic bomb tests at Bikini Atoll designed to test the effectiveness of nuclear weapons on warships. Over 200 warships participated in the experiments, 75 of them as targets, the rest as support vessels.

Rockwall was then transferred to the Amphibious Force, U.S. Atlantic Fleet, and soon began amphibious training operations in the Caribbean. On 15 March 1947, Rockwall was decommissioned and entered the Atlantic Reserve Fleet.

=== Cold War ===
The ship was recommissioned on 3 March 1951 at San Francisco. Her duties during the next 4 years were varied. Rockwall carried 1,500 Army troops to Bremerhaven, Germany in August 1952. The next spring, she took part in refresher training off Guantanamo Bay, Cuba. In January 1954, the transport embarked Marines at Morehead City, North Carolina, for a 5-month tour of duty in the Mediterranean with the 6th Fleet. She returned to Norfolk, Virginia on 27 May and began a series of amphibious operations off the beaches of Virginia and Vieques Island near Puerto Rico.

==== Final decommissioning ====
Rockwall entered the Reserve Fleet again 4 June 1955 and decommissioned 28 September. On 1 December 1958, she was struck from the Navy List and was transferred to the custody of the Maritime Administration, after which she was berthed in James River, Virginia. She was disposed of by MARAD on 1 August 1983. She was then towed to Barcelona, where she was scrapped by Balboa Desguaces Maritimos, S.A., in early 1984.

== Awards ==
For her service in World War II, Rockwall earned one battle star.
