= John McKinley =

U.S. Supreme Court justice from 1838 to 1852

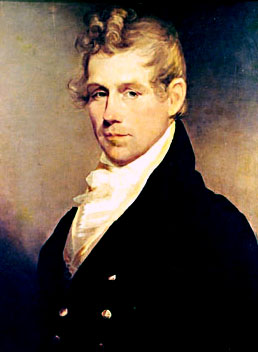

Associate Justice of the Supreme Court of the United States
- In office April 22, 1837 – July 19, 1852
- Nominated by: Martin Van Buren
- Preceded by: Seat established
- Succeeded by: John Archibald Campbell

United States Senator from Alabama
- In office March 4, 1837 – April 22, 1837
- Preceded by: Gabriel Moore
- Succeeded by: Clement Clay
- In office November 27, 1826 – March 3, 1831
- Preceded by: Israel Pickens
- Succeeded by: Gabriel Moore

Member of the U.S. House of Representatives from Alabama's 2nd district
- In office March 4, 1833 – March 3, 1835
- Preceded by: Samuel Mardis
- Succeeded by: Joshua Martin

Personal details
- Born: May 1, 1780 Culpeper County, Virginia, U.S.
- Died: July 19, 1852 (aged 72) Louisville, Kentucky, U.S.
- Resting place: Cave Hill Cemetery; Louisville, Kentucky, U.S.
- Party: Democratic-Republican (c. 1815–1825); Jacksonian/Democratic (1826–1852)
- Other political affiliations: Federalist (before 1815)

John McKinley (May 1, 1780 – July 19, 1852) was a United States Senator from the state of Alabama and an associate justice of the Supreme Court of the United States.

== Early life ==
McKinley was born in Culpeper County, Virginia, on May 1, 1780, to Andrew McKinley and Mary (Logan) McKinley (sister of Benjamin Logan). His family moved to Kentucky in 1783. There, he read law and was admitted to the bar in 1800, practicing in Frankfort and in Louisville. During the War of 1812, he was actively involved in military affairs and wrote to President James Madison expressing his desire to serve and requesting a major's commission, but he did not receive a commission.

He was partners with John Coffee and James Jackson and others in the Cypress Land Company and as such, in 1818, he moved to Alabama. He established legal practice in Huntsville, and also actively engaged in land speculation.

== Political career ==
McKinley was elected to the Alabama House of Representatives in August 1820. the next year he moved his family from Huntsville to Florence, and so was ineligible for re-election.

When failing health forced John Williams Walker to resign from the United States Senate in 1822, Mckinley was the favored candidate in the special election to fill the vacancy, but lost to William Kelly by a one-vote margin.

November 27, 1826, he was elected as a Jacksonian to finish the unexpired term of Senator Henry H. Chambers, who died in office. When he sought re-election in 1830, he lost to Gabriel Moore.

During the 1830s, McKinley was twice elected to the Alabama House, in 1831 and 1836. In between he served one term in the United States House of Representatives, during the 1833–35 23rd Congress. There he was a champion of President Andrew Jackson's political agenda. He also was a Presidential Elector in the 1836 presidential election, casting his vote for Martin Van Buren. McKinley was again elected to the U.S. Senate in 1836, this time easily defeating Gabriel Moore. He did not remain in office long however, as he resigned in April 1837, to take a seat on the United States Supreme Court.

== Supreme Court service ==
The number of seats on the Supreme Court was expanded from seven to nine in March 1837, as a result of the Eighth and Ninth Circuits Act. This allowed President Jackson the opportunity to appoint two new associate justices, which he did on March 3, 1837, his last full day in office. The newly seated Senate of the 25th Congress confirmed both nominees; but one, William Smith, subsequently declined to serve.

President Martin Van Buren offered McKinley a recess appointment to the vacant seat on April 22, 1837, and later formally nominated him to for it on September 18, 1837. McKinley was confirmed by the United States Senate on September 25, 1837, by a voice vote.

McKinley was assigned to the ninth circuit, which encompassed the states of: Alabama, Mississippi, Louisiana, and Arkansas.

During his 14 years on the Court, McKinley wrote 22 opinions, several of which were dissenting opinions in the interest of preserving States' rights.

Noteworthy opinions include: Bank of Augusta v. Earle (1839); Groves v. Slaughter (1841); Pollard v. Hagan (1845) and Passenger Cases (1849).

== Personal life ==
McKinley was married twice. In 1814, he married Juliana Bryan (d. 1822). They had three children: Elizabeth, Andrew and Mary. In 1824, he married Elizabeth Armistead (d. 1891). They had no children.

In 1821, McKinley was appointed to serve on the original board of trustees for the University of Alabama and helped plan the campus design and curriculum. He was also a founding member of the First Presbyterian Church of Florence, Alabama, where he was elected as an elder in 1826.

McKinley owned twelve slaves at the time of the 1850 census.

McKinley moved his family to Louisville, Kentucky soon after his appointment to the Supreme Court. He later died there on July 19, 1852, at the age of 72, and is buried at Cave Hill Cemetery.

== Legacy and honors ==
The community of McKinley, Alabama is named in his honor.

The World War II Liberty ship SS John McKinley was named in his honor.

== See also ==
- List of justices of the Supreme Court of the United States

U.S. House of Representatives
Preceded by Samuel Mardis	Member of the U.S. House of Representatives from Alabama's 2nd congressional district March 4, 1833 – March 3, 1835	Succeeded by Joshua Martin
U.S. Senate
Preceded by Israel Pickens	U.S. senator (Class 3) from Alabama; 1826–1831; Served alongside: William King	Succeeded by Gabriel Moore
Preceded by Gabriel Moore	U.S. senator (Class 3) from Alabama; 1837; Served alongside: William King	Succeeded by Clement Clay
Legal offices
New seat	Associate Justice of the Supreme Court of the United States; 1838–1852	Succeeded by John Campbell
