= SS John McKinley =

World War II Liberty ship of the United States

History

United States
- Name: John McKinley
- Namesake: John McKinley
- Owner: War Shipping Administration (WSA)
- Operator: Dichman, Wright, and Pugh
- Ordered: as type (EC2-S-C1) hull, MC hull 1495
- Builder: J.A. Jones Construction, Brunswick, Georgia
- Cost: $1,952,888
- Yard number: 111
- Way number: 1
- Laid down: 23 March 1943
- Launched: 31 July 1943
- Sponsored by: Myrtle McCranie Willacoochee
- Completed: 20 August 1943
- Identification: Call Signal: KIQY
- Fate: Laid up in National Defense Reserve Fleet, Suisun Bay, 19 October 1945; Delivered for scrapping, 7 February 1967

General characteristics
- Class & type: Liberty ship; type EC2-S-C1, standard
- Tonnage: 10,865 LT DWT; 7,176 GRT
- Displacement: 3,380 long tons (3,434 t) (light); 14,245 long tons (14,474 t) (max)
- Length: 441 feet 6 inches (135 m) oa; 416 feet (127 m) pp; 427 feet (130 m) lwl
- Beam: 57 feet (17 m)
- Draft: 27 ft 9.25 in (8.4646 m)
- Installed power: 2 × Oil fired 450 °F (232 °C) boilers, operating at 220 psi (1,500 kPa); 2,500 hp (1,900 kW)
- Propulsion: 1 × triple-expansion steam engine, (manufactured by General Machinery Corp., Hamilton, Ohio); 1 × screw propeller
- Speed: 11.5 knots (21.3 km/h; 13.2 mph)
- Capacity: 562,608 cubic feet (15,931 m^{3}) (grain); 499,573 cubic feet (14,146 m^{3}) (bale)
- Complement: 38–62 USMM; 21–40 USNAG
- Armament: Varied by ship; Bow-mounted 3-inch (76 mm)/50-caliber gun; Stern-mounted 4-inch (102 mm)/50-caliber gun; 2–8 × single 20-millimeter (0.79 in) Oerlikon anti-aircraft (AA) cannons and/or, 2–8 × 37-millimeter (1.46 in) M1 AA guns

SS John McKinley was a Liberty ship built in the United States during World War II. She was named after John McKinley, an Associate Justice of the Supreme Court of the United States and U.S. Senator from Alabama.

== Construction ==
John McKinley was laid down on 23 March 1943, under a United States Maritime Commission (MARCOM) contract, MC hull 1495, by J.A. Jones Construction, Brunswick, Georgia; sponsored by Myrtle McCranie Willacoochee, and launched on 31 July 1943.

== History ==
She was allocated to Dichman, Wright, and Pugh, on 20 August 1943. On 19 October 1945, she entered the National Defense Reserve Fleet in Suisun Bay. She was sold to Zidell Exploration, Inc., Portland, Oregon, for $45,101, and delivered for scrapping on 7 February 1967.

== Bibliography ==
- "Jones Construction, Brunswick GA". ShipbuildingHistory.com. 13 October 2010.
- "Liberty Ships – World War II".
- Maritime Administration. "John McKinley". Ship History Database Vessel Status Card. U.S. Department of Transportation, Maritime Administration. Archived from the original on 12 December 2019.
- Davies, James (May 2004). "Specifications (As-Built)" (PDF). p. 23.
- "SS John McKinley".
