= USS Rawlins =

1944 attack transport ship in United States Navy

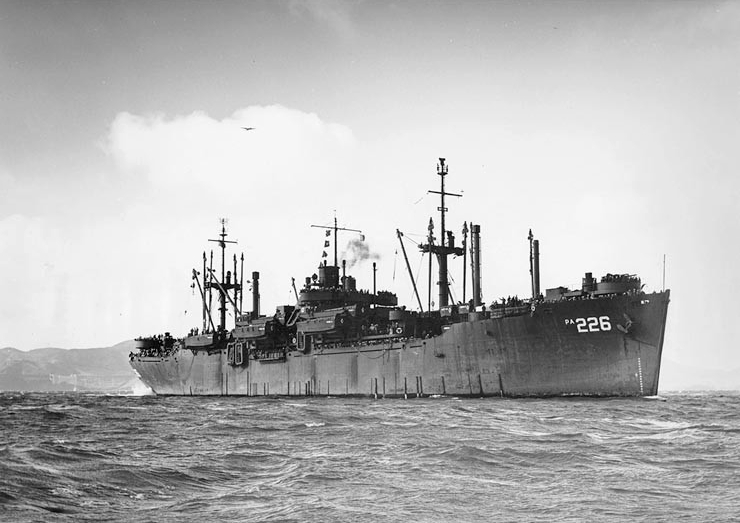
- Rawlins in San Francisco Bay, circa in late 1945

History

United States
- Name: USS Rawlins (APA-226)
- Namesake: Rawlins County, Kansas
- Builder: Kaiser Shipbuilding
- Laid down: 10 August 1944
- Launched: 21 October 1944
- Sponsored by: Mrs C. C. Connors
- Acquired: 11 November 1944
- Commissioned: 11 November 1944
- Decommissioned: 15 November 1946
- Stricken: 1 October 1958
- Honours and awards: One battle star for World War II service
- Fate: Sold for scrap, August 1987

General characteristics
- Class & type: Haskell-class attack transport
- Displacement: 6,873 tons (lt), 14,837 t. (fl)
- Length: 455 ft
- Beam: 62 ft
- Draft: 28 ft 1 in
- Propulsion: 1 x Westinghouse geared turbine, 2 x Combustion Engineering header-type boilers, 1 x propeller, designed shaft horsepower 8,500
- Speed: 18 knots
- Boats & landing craft carried: 2 x LCM, 12 x LCVP, 3 x LCPU
- Capacity: 86 Officers 1,475 Enlisted
- Crew: 56 Officers, 480 enlisted
- Armament: 1 x 5"/38 caliber dual-purpose gun mount, 1 x quad 40mm gun mount, 4 x twin 40 mm gun mounts, 10 x single 20mm gun mounts
- Notes: MCV Hull No. 672, hull type VC2-S-AP5

USS Rawlins (APA-226) was a Haskell-class attack transport in service with the United States Navy from 1944 to 1946. She was scrapped in 1987.

== History ==
Rawlins was named after Rawlins County, Kansas. She was built under Maritime Commission contract (MCV hull 672), was laid down by Kaiser Shipbuilding of Vancouver, Washington on 10 August 1944, launched 21 October 1944, and delivered to the Maritime Commission 10 November 1941. She was acquired by the Navy on loan-charter basis and commissioned 11 November 1944, Comdr. C. S. Beightler in command.

=== World War II ===
Following shakedown and training off the California coast Rawlins put into San Francisco for loading and routing to South Pacific ports. On 16 January 1945, she sailed for New Caledonia with miscellaneous cargo and Army replacement units. After delivery to Nouméa, she continued on to Guadalcanal, arriving 8 February to join TransRon 18, then rehearsing for Operation Iceberg, the assault on Okinawa.

==== Invasion of Okinawa ====
On 14 March Rawlins, with 1st Marine Division units embarked, got underway for Ulithi for final logistics and on 27 March sailed for the Hagushi beaches on Okinawa. Arriving 1 April she remained until the 5th then retired to Saipan, whence she continued east to San Francisco. In July she returned to Okinawa with reinforcements, then, in early August, carried fresh troops to the Philippines from the east coast.

=== Post-war ===
After the cessation of hostilities, Rawlins ferried occupation troops to Japan, then at the end of October was assigned to transport Army troops from the Philippines to San Francisco. On 27 July 1946 she terminated her last Operation Magic Carpet run at Pearl Harbor, then swung south, transited the Panama Canal, and on 5 August arrived at Norfolk for inactivation.

=== Decommissioning and fate ===
Navy owned as of 26 May 1946, Rawlins decommissioned 15 November 1946 and was berthed at Norfolk as a unit of the Atlantic Reserve Fleet. There for the next 12 years, Rawlins was transferred to the Maritime Administration 19 September 1958 and her name was struck from the Navy List 1 October 1958. She was sold for scrap in August 1987.

== Awards ==
Rawlins received one battle star for World War II service.
