= USS Rockbridge =

Attack transport

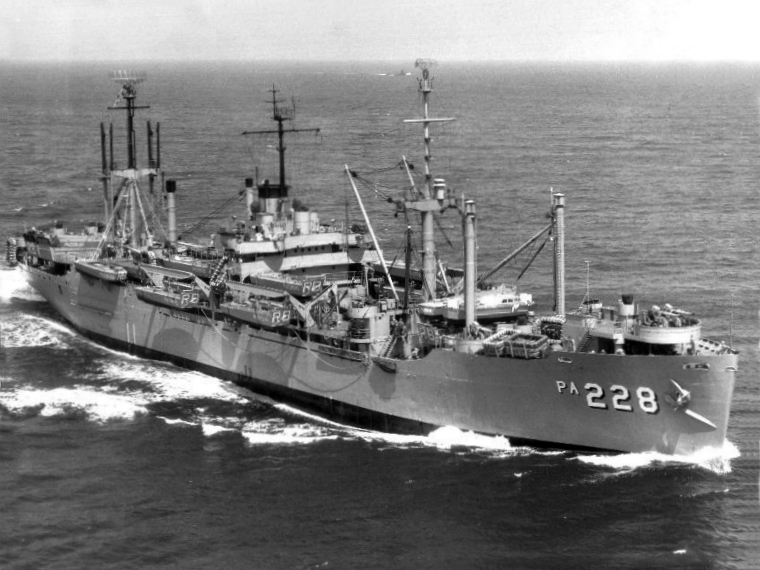

History

United States
- Name: USS Rockbridge
- Namesake: Rockbridge County, Virginia
- Builder: Kaiser Shipbuilding Company, Vancouver, Washington
- Laid down: 2 September 1944
- Launched: 28 October 1944
- Commissioned: 18 November 1944
- Decommissioned: 8 March 1947
- Recommissioned: 23 December 1950
- Decommissioned: 29 November 1968
- Stricken: 1 December 1968
- Honors and awards: 1 battle star (World War II)
- Fate: Sold for scrapping, 27 May 1969
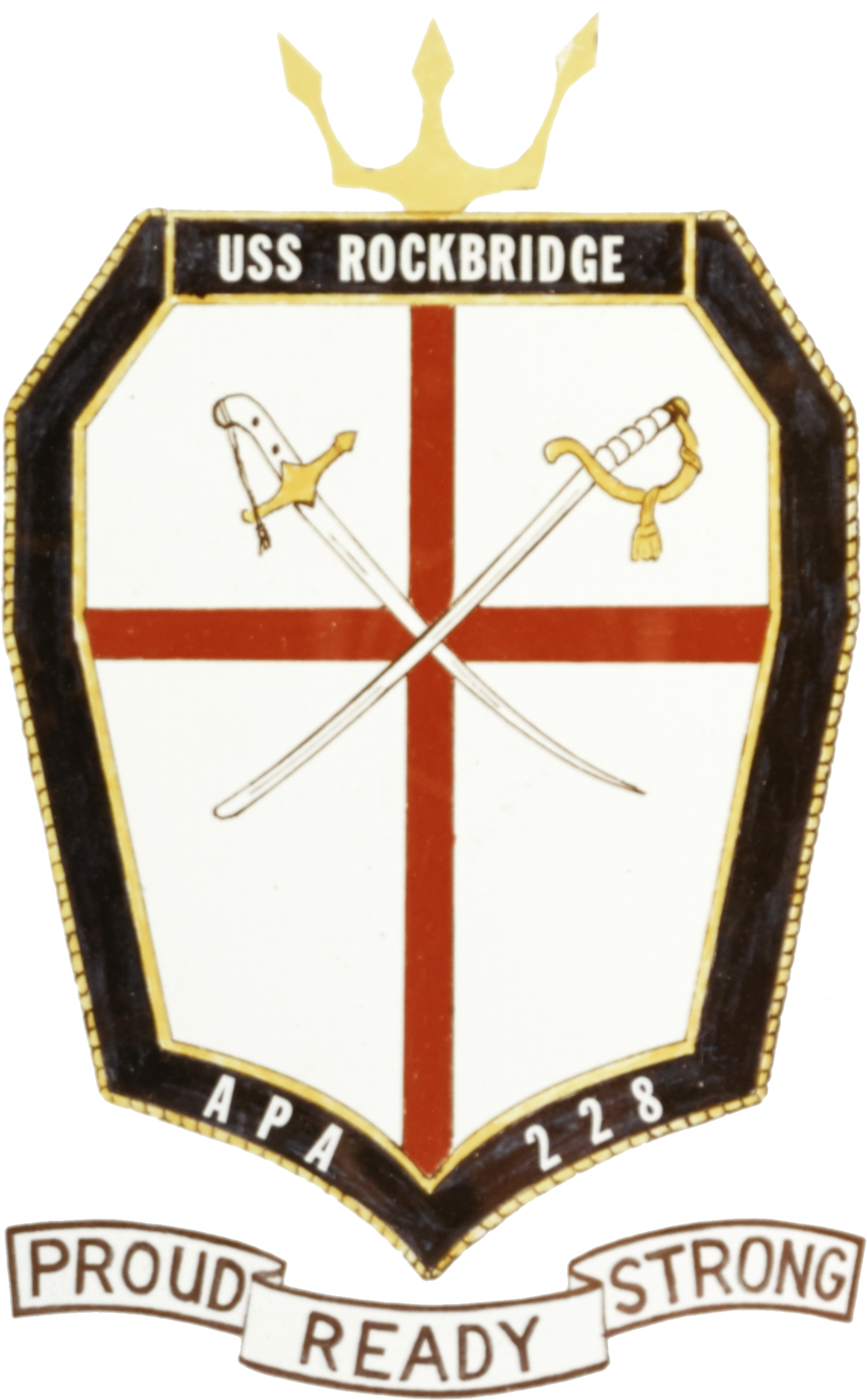
- Badge

General characteristics
- Class & type: Haskell-class attack transport
- Displacement: 12,450 long tons (12,650 t) full
- Length: 455 ft (139 m)
- Beam: 62 ft (19 m)
- Draft: 24 ft (7.3 m)
- Propulsion: 1 × Joshua Hendy geared turbine; 8,500 shp (6,338 kW)
- Speed: 17.7 knots (32.8 km/h; 20.4 mph)
- Troops: 1,561 troops
- Complement: 536 officers and enlisted
- Armament: 1 × 5"/38 caliber guns; 1 × quad 40 mm gun; 4 × twin 40 mm guns; 10 × single 20 mm guns

USS Rockbridge (APA-228) was a Haskell-class attack transport in service with the United States Navy from 1944 to 1947 and from 1950 to 1968. She was scrapped in 1969.

== History ==
Rockbridge was named for Rockbridge County in Virginia. She was laid down for the Maritime Commission (MCV hull 674) on 2 September 1944 by the Kaiser Shipbuilding Company in Vancouver, Washington, launched on 28 October 1944; sponsored by Mrs. C. J. Hearn, acquired by the Navy on loan-charter on 18 November 1944; and commissioned the same day.

=== 1944–1947 ===
The new attack transport arrived at Pearl Harbor on 4 February 1945, sailed for Iwo Jima on the 20th, and operated off that island for two weeks. She returned to Seattle, Washington, on 28 May and on 6 June embarked Army troops for Okinawa. Rockbridge arrived at the Hagushi anchorage on 24 July to debark the men and discharge cargo. During the six days she spent off Okinawa, the ship was harassed by night air attacks, but suffered no damage because of the concealing smoke made by all the vessels in the harbor.

Rockbridge was off Ulithi in mid-August when the Japanese surrender was announced. During September and October she made two voyages to Japan with occupation troops and then joined the "Magic Carpet" fleet to bring home servicemen eligible for discharge.

Assigned to Joint Task Force 1 in the spring of 1946, she served as a floating hotel for the crews of target vessels Arkansas (BB-33), New York (BB-34), and Salt Lake City (CA-25) during that summer's atomic bomb tests on Bikini.

Rockbridge was decommissioned on 8 March 1947 and entered the Pacific Reserve Fleet.

=== 1950–1968 ===
After the outbreak of hostilities in Korea, she was ordered reactivated. She was recommissioned on 23 December 1950, and in May 1951 joined Amphibious Force, U.S. Atlantic Fleet.

From 1951 to 1968, the transport participated in numerous amphibious training programs at Onslow Beach, North Carolina, Little Creek, Virginia; Guantanamo Bay, Cuba; and Vieques, Puerto Rico.

During her long service, she made eight Mediterranean cruises. Highlights included her participation in "Weldfast" a large-scale NATO operation in 1953, standby alert for possible evacuation of U.S. citizens from Egypt during the 1956 Suez Canal nationalization crisis, and aid to earthquake victims of Greece in 1953; and to flood victims in France in 1959.

During the Cuban Missile Crisis in the fall of 1962, Rockbridge carried reinforcements to Guantanamo Bay and returned to the United States for additional troops, which she held in combat readiness until December. In January 1964 Rockbridge, along with other ships from Phibron 8, was in Cristobal, Panama during the riots. She spent roughly 45 days tied up at the Coco Solo Naval Air Station. During July, 1966, the transport took part in the production of an amphibious training film, Boat Group Tactics, filmed in Hampton Roads, Virginia. Rockbridge also starred in The Proud and Profane and supported the filming of PT-109. A boat crew from Rockbridge was assigned to the film crew to operate the LCVP and Japanese landing craft used in the film.

Rockbridge was again decommissioned on 29 November 1968, struck from the Navy List on 1 December 1968 and sold to Boston Metals Company of Baltimore, Maryland, on 27 May 1969 for scrapping.

== Awards ==
For her World War II service, Rockbridge received one battle star.
