= SS Rushville Victory =

Victory ship of the United States

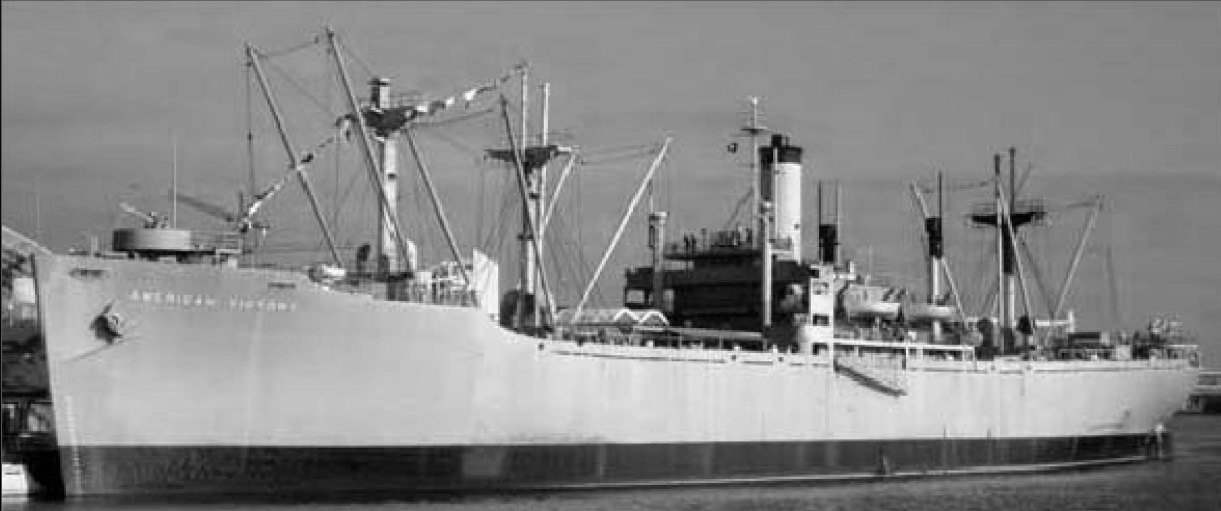
- VC2-S-AP2 type Victory ship

History

United States
- Name: SS Rushville Victory
- Namesake: City of Rushville, Illinois
- Owner: War Shipping Administration
- Operator: Dichmann, Wright & Pugh, Inc.
- Builder: Bethlehem-Fairfield Shipyard Corp.
- Laid down: March 3, 1945
- Launched: April 24, 1945
- Completed: May 22, 1945
- Renamed: Nikobar 1947, then Aydin 1954
- Fate: Sold to private; sank 1958

General characteristics
- Tonnage: 7,607 tons (GRT), 4,551 tons (NRT)
- Displacement: 15,200 tons (full load), 10,875 tons (lightweight)
- Length: 455 ft (139 m)
- Beam: 62 ft (19 m)
- Draft: 28 ft (8.5 m)
- Propulsion: 2 B&W oil-fired steam boilers, 2 steam turbines, single propeller, 6,000 shp (4,500 kW)
- Speed: 16 knots (30 km/h; 18 mph)
- Troops: 1597
- Armament: 1 × 5-inch (127 mm)/38 caliber gun; 1 × 3-inch (76 mm)/50 caliber gun; 8 × 20 mm Oerlikon
- Notes: Hull Type: C2-S-AP2; MCV hull No. 651

SS Rushville Victory was a Victory ship-based troop transport built for the US Army Transportation Corps (USAT) late in World War II under the Emergency Shipbuilding program. It saw service in the European Theater of Operations in 1945, 1946 and in the immediate post-war period repatriating US troops.

After being briefly laid up in the US, Rushville Victory was sold for private cargo shipping in 1947 and sank near Antwerp in 1958.

== History ==
=== Construction ===
SS Rushville Victory was laid down on March 3, 1945, as a US Maritime Commission (MARCOM) Type C2 ship-based VC2-S-AP2, MCV hull No. 651, by Bethlehem-Fairfield Shipyard of Baltimore, Maryland. SS Rushville Victory was the last of the 50 Victory ships built by the Bethlehem Ship Corporation. She was launched on April 24, 1945, and later converted into a dedicated troopship. She was operated on behalf of the US Army Transportation Corps (USAT) by Dichmann, Wright & Pugh, Inc.

Beginning on May 25, 1945, Rushville Victory was converted to a troopship along with six other Victory cargo ships at the Savannah Waterfront by the Savannah Machine & Foundry Company. Her cargo holds were converted to mess halls, exercise places, and sleeping areas with hammocks and bunk beds.

=== Operation ===
As a transport allocated to USAT, the Rushville Victory was crewed by US Merchant Marines, protected by a contingent of the US Navy Armed Guards, and had a complement of the US Army Transportation Corps (Water Division) aboard for troop administration. She was armed with a 5-inch (127 mm) stern gun for use against submarines and surface ships, and a bow-mounted 3-inch (76 mm) gun and eight 20 mm cannon for use against aircraft.

Her Atlantic Ocean crossings include:

- Departed Le Havre, France, October 3, 1945, and arrived in the Port of New York on October 11, 1945.
- Departed Calais, France, on October 31, 1945, and arrived in New York on November 12, 1945.
- Departed Marseille, France, on November 24, 1945, and arrived in New York on December 7, 1945.
- Departed Le Havre, France, and arrived in New Jersey on January 5, 1946.
- Departed Antwerp, Belgium, with 1,530 troops, including the: 3235th and 3006th Ordnance Depot Company, 7th Medical Convalescence Hospital, 39th Heavy Signal Construction Battalion, 4423rd Quartermaster Depot Supply Company and the 355th Quartermaster Railhead Company and arrived on February 2, 1946, in New York.

In April 1946, the Rushville Victory took German POWs from New York to Antwerp; this included the crews of the U-boats U-530 and U-977.

As part of Operation Magic Carpet she took US troops home from European port cities known as Cigarette Camps.

Near the end of 1946, with her Atlantic crossings completed, she was laid up in the James River in Virginia as part of the National Defense Reserve Fleet.

== Private use and sinking ==
Rushville Victory was sold in 1947 to A/S Det Ostasiatiske Kompagni of Copenhagen, Denmark and renamed MV Nikobar. In 1954 she was sold to Deniz Nikilyati in Istanbul, Turkey and renamed SS Aydin. In 1955 she was sold to D. B. Deniz Nakliyati T.A.S. of Istanbul and kept her name. On February 11, 1958, The Aydin had a collision with the MS Charles Tellier, owned by French Cie de Messageries Maritimes. After the collision she ran aground in the Schelde River near Antwerp to avoid sinking. She was abandoned and declared a total loss; her masts could be seen above the water line for many years.

== See also ==
- Victory Ship
- Liberty Ship
