= USS Woodson =

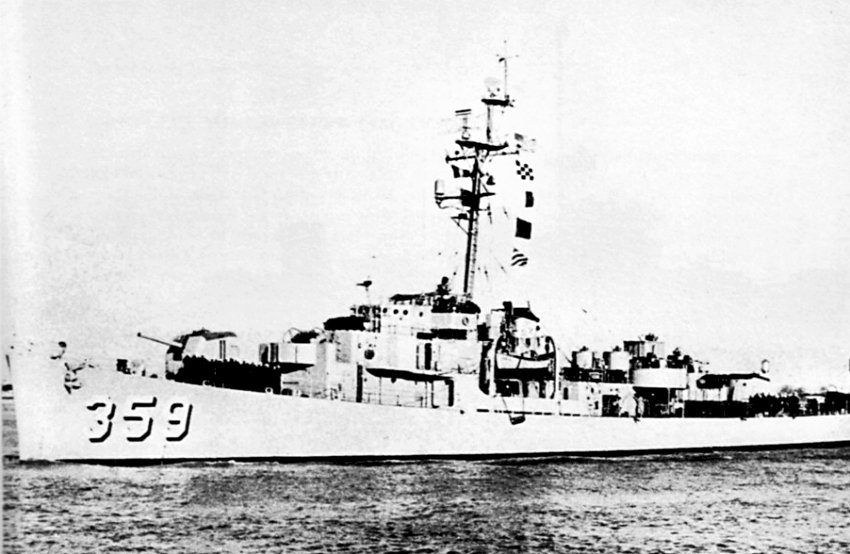
- USS Woodson (DE-359) underway c. the 1950s

History

United States
- Name: Woodson
- Namesake: Jeff Davis Woodson
- Builder: Consolidated Steel Corporation, Orange, Texas
- Laid down: 7 March 1944
- Launched: 29 April 1944
- Commissioned: 24 August 1944
- Decommissioned: 15 January 1947
- Commissioned: 19 May 1951
- Decommissioned: 11 August 1962
- In service: 16 May 1959
- Stricken: 1 July 1965
- Identification: DE-359
- Fate: Sold for scrap, 16 August 1966

General characteristics
- Class & type: John C. Butler-class destroyer escort
- Displacement: 1,350 long tons (1,372 t)
- Length: 306 ft (93 m)
- Beam: 36 ft 8 in (11.18 m)
- Draft: 9 ft 5 in (2.87 m)
- Propulsion: 2 boilers, 2 geared turbine engines, 12,000 shp (8,900 kW); 2 propellers
- Speed: 24 knots (44 km/h; 28 mph)
- Range: 6,000 nmi (11,000 km; 6,900 mi) at 12 kn (22 km/h; 14 mph)
- Complement: 14 officers, 201 enlisted
- Armament: 2 × single 5 in (127 mm) guns; 2 × twin 40 mm (1.6 in) AA guns; 10 × single 20 mm (0.79 in) AA guns; 1 × triple 21 in (533 mm) torpedo tubes; 8 × depth charge throwers; 1 × Hedgehog ASW mortar; 2 × depth charge racks

USS Woodson (DE-359) was a John C. Butler-class destroyer escort acquired by the United States Navy during World War II. The primary purpose of the destroyer escort was to escort and protect ships in convoy, in addition to other tasks as assigned, such as patrol or radar picket.

Woodson was named in honor of Jeff Davis Woodson, who was awarded the Navy Cross posthumously for his valiant effort during the Battle of Midway. The ship's keel was laid down on 7 March 1944 at Orange, Texas, by the Consolidated Steel Corp., Ltd. The vessel was launched on 29 April 1944; sponsored by Mrs. Joyce M. Woodson and commissioned on 24 August 1944.

== Namesake ==
Jeff Davis Woodson was born on 10 June 1908 in Autman, Texas. He enlisted in the United States Navy on 23 June 1926 at Little Rock, Arkansas. Earning his first rating as a fireman third class in four months, he served on USS Aroostook and advanced to the rating of fireman second class on 1 January 1929. That summer, he transferred to an aviation squadron, VJ-1B, and began training as an aviation machinist's mate. In April 1929, he took a reduction in rank to enter the aviation field and became an aviation machinist's mate third class. However, after training at the Naval Air Station, San Diego, California, and pilot training at the Naval Air Station, Pensacola, Florida, he was advanced to the rating of aviation pilot first class.

During the 1930s he served in various patrol and scouting squadrons and served a tour of duty on USS Lexington. By the late spring of 1937, he had advanced to the rating of chief aviation machinist's mate. During 1940 and 1941, he served successively in VU-1, the destroyer USS Benham and at the naval air stations located at Norfolk, Virginia, and Pensacola. On 2 September 1941, he joined Torpedo Squadron 8 (VT-8) attached to USS Hornet. For the next few months, he and his ship conducted training out of Norfolk. That routine continued after the attack on Pearl Harbor on 7 December. On 7 April 1942 he was temporarily promoted to the rank of lieutenant, junior grade.

As a Douglas TBD Devastator torpedo bomber pilot in VT-8, Woodson took part in the pivotal Battle of Midway on 4 June 1942. Woodson and the rest of the squadron attacked the Japanese aircraft carriers without fighter cover and in the face of withering antiaircraft fire and heavy Japanese fighter opposition. Though all of VT-8's aircraft were shot down, they succeeded in diverting Japanese fighter cover and preventing further launches of Japanese carrier aircraft, thus contributing to the United States Navy's victory in the battle. Woodson was killed during the attack. Woodson was awarded the Navy Cross posthumously and shared in the Presidential Unit Citation awarded to VT-8 for its actions in the Battle of Midway.

== Operational history ==
=== World War II North Atlantic operations ===
After fitting out at Galveston, Texas, the destroyer escort embarked upon her shakedown cruise on 11 September. En route to her training area in the vicinity of Bermuda, she assisted the survivors of the destroyer Warrington which had sunk off the U.S. East Coast during a hurricane. Woodson rescued a number of survivors, carried them to Norfolk, Virginia, and then resumed shakedown training around Bermuda. The warship completed that training and arrived in Boston, Massachusetts, on 25 October. After two weeks of post-shakedown availability, she stood out of Boston on 6 November, bound for Norfolk where she spent the remainder of the month serving as a school ship for the Operational Training Command, Atlantic Fleet.

=== Transferred to the Pacific Fleet ===
On the last day of November, she departed Norfolk and shaped a course for the Pacific Ocean and duty with the U.S. 7th Fleet in the southwestern Pacific Ocean. Steaming via the Panama Canal, the Galápagos Islands, and Bora Bora in the Society Islands, she arrived at Hollandia on the northern coast of New Guinea on 3 January 1945. Upon her arrival, the destroyer escort was assigned to convoy duty between New Guinea and the Philippines, primarily on the Hollandia-to-Leyte run. Early in April, however, she dropped her runs to New Guinea and limited her operations to escort missions among major ports in the Philippines such as Leyte, Lingayen Gulf, and Manila Bay. That duty lasted until 25 May when she reported to the Commander, Task Group (TG) 71.5 at Subic Bay for duty escorting submarines to and from their war patrol release points. When not engaged in her primary duty, Woodson participated in post-refit exercises with submarines and conducted antisubmarine patrols. Such activities occupied her through the end of hostilities and until the end of August.

=== End-of-war activity ===
On 31 August, she was detached from task group TG 71.5 and departed Subic Bay, bound for the Ryukyus. At Okinawa on 4 September, she became an element of task group TG 70.3, the escort group for the occupation forces headed for northern China and Korea. On 5 October, she left Okinawa and steamed to Shanghai, where she arrived late the following day. She next returned to Leyte and remained there until 22 October, when she headed back to Okinawa, where she joined another China occupation convoy which sailed in early November. At Hong Kong at mid-month, the destroyer escort departed again on the 21st and shaped a course for Okinawa, where she arrived on 24 November. Two days later, she began her voyage home.

=== Stateside-based operations ===
Stopping at Pearl Harbor en route, Woodson arrived in San Pedro, Los Angeles, on 16 December to begin inactivation overhaul. On 16 May 1946, she was placed in commission, in reserve, and remained so until 15 January 1947 at which time she was decommissioned. Except for a brief period during the winter of 1948 and 1949 when she made a round-trip run under tow to Long Beach, California, for an overhaul, she remained at San Diego, California, until the spring of 1951. On 19 May 1951, Woodson was recommissioned at San Diego.

The warship spent most of the summer of 1951 conducting shakedown training and other local operations along the coast of southern California. On 4 September, she got underway from San Diego on her way to the east coast. Steaming via the Panama Canal, Woodson arrived in Newport, Rhode Island, in mid-September and began local operations. On 19 October, the warship departed the Newport area to participate in the annual Atlantic Fleet exercises held in the vicinity of Puerto Rico. She returned to Newport on 17 November and remained there through the end of the year.

On 16 January 1952, the destroyer escort headed for Philadelphia, Pennsylvania, where she arrived two days later. There, she began a three-month overhaul at the Philadelphia Naval Shipyard. Woodson completed repairs on 22 April and headed back to Newport but under tow given by Atakapa.

She reentered Newport on 25 April but remained there less than two weeks, departing again on 7 May. She reached Guantanamo Bay, Cuba, four days later and began six weeks of refresher training. The destroyer escort completed that assignment on 20 June and set course—via Ciudad Trujillo, Dominican Republic—for Newport. The warship reentered her home port on 28 June. Two days later, she became an element of the newly formed Hunter-Killer Group, Atlantic Fleet, under the overall command of Rear Admiral Daniel V. Gallery.

=== Hunter-killer operations ===
For the next five years, Woodson ranged the length of the Atlantic coast of the United States from Newport in the north to Cuba and the West Indies in the south. Her activities consisted mostly of type training and independent ship's exercises. Frequently, however, she served as target ship for submarines engaged in training and as school ship for the Fleet Sonar School located at Key West, Florida. Fleet exercises, special projects, and periodic overhauls also added further variety to her schedule of operations. During June 1957, she also participated in the International Fleet Review held at Norfolk. That same month, her home port was changed from Newport, Rhode Island, to Key West, Florida. Summer brought a midshipman cruise down the St. Lawrence River to Quebec, Canada, and thence back to Boston and finally to Norfolk. On 16 August, she finally entered her new home port for the first time since her reassignment.

=== First Mediterranean cruise ===
Her stay there proved brief for, on 30 August, she embarked upon her first voyage to the Mediterranean in company with Escort Squadron 1 (CortRon) 12. She arrived at Naples, Italy, on 14 September and, soon thereafter, began a full round of NATO exercises, highlighted by amphibious assault training at Souda Bay, Crete. At the conclusion of her Mediterranean assignment on 6 November, she departed Gibraltar and headed via the Azores to Key West. Upon her arrival in Key West on 20 November, Woodson saw CortRon 12 broken up and parceled out ship by ship to various ports to support the training of Naval Reserve units.

=== Training Naval Reservists ===
She got underway on 2 December; headed for her own new home port, New Orleans, Louisiana; and arrived there two days later. For the remainder of her active career, Woodson cruised the waters of the Gulf of Mexico and the West Indies training New Orleans–based naval reservists. On 16 May 1959, her status was reduced from in commission to in service, though her mission, Naval Reserve training, remained the same. She helped naval reservists to polish their skills both at dockside at New Orleans and underway in the Gulf of Mexico until 11 August 1962 when she was placed in reserve.

=== Final decommissioning ===
Following inspection and survey in June 1965, her name was struck from the Navy List on 1 July 1965. She was sold for scrapping to the Boston Metals Co., of Baltimore, Maryland, on 16 August 1966.
