= Dichmann, Wright & Pugh, Inc. =

Former US Shipping Company

- Company type: Shareholder
- Industry: transportation and shipping
- Founded: 1925 in Norfolk, Virginia
- Key people: Vilh Dichmann; Bland Saunders Wright; Frank C. Pugh; Clint B. Sellers; Alan Smith

Dichmann, Wright & Pugh, Inc. was a shipping company founded in Norfolk, Virginia in 1925 by Vilh Dichmann, Bland Saunders Wright, Frank C. Pugh, Clint B. Sellers, and Alan Smith. Pugh had operated a company office in Philadelphia. Clint B. Sellers operated a company office in New York City. Saunders Wright was Dichmann, Wright & Pugh, Inc. President. Alan Smith was the company secretary and treasurer. Bland Saunders Wright worked in the Dichmann, Wright & Pugh, Inc. headquarters in Norfolk until his death on October 16, 1944. After Wright death, Alan Smith became president of Dichmann, Wright & Pugh, Inc and John M. Levick became assistant secretary and treasurer. With the start of World War II Dichmann, Wright & Pugh, Inc. supported the war effort.

== World War II ==
Dichmann, Wright & Pugh, Inc. fleet of ships were used to help the World War II effort. During World War II Dichmann, Wright & Pugh, Inc. operated Merchant navy ships for the United States Shipping Board. During World War II Dichmann, Wright & Pugh, Inc. was active with charter shipping with the Maritime Commission and War Shipping Administration. Dichmann, Wright & Pugh, Inc. operated Liberty ships and Victory ships for the merchant navy. The ship was run by its Dichmann, Wright & Pugh, Inc. crew and the US Navy supplied United States Navy Armed Guards to man the deck guns and radio.

== Ships ==
Ships owned:

- USS Bullock (AK-165) purchased in 1947

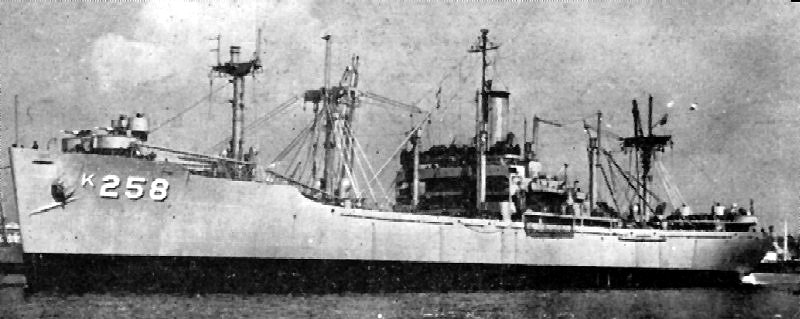
A Victory ship of World War II

Liberty ship of World War II

  - World War II operated:
  - Liberty Ships:
- SS Matthew Lyon
- Barbara Frietchie
- Paul Dunbar
- Rushville Victory, troop ship
- Lloyd S. Carlson
- Luther S. Kelly
- George Sharswood
- Sidney Wright
- Matthew Lyon
- David Wilmot, post war work in 1946
- William H. Kendrick, post war work in 1947
- William H. Wilmer
- Thomas Say post war work in 1947
- Niels Poulson, on Sept. 14, 1946 hit mined off Gorgona, Italy, towed to Leghorn but was total lose.
- Ezra Meech
- Arlie Clark
- Henry M. Robert
- Frederick H. Baetjer
- SS John McKinley
- James Moore, troop ship
  - Victory ship operated:
- SS Rushville Victory

- C1 Cargo ship
- MS Sea Witch
- USS Antrim (AK-159)

== See also ==
- World War II United States Merchant Navy
