= USS Rockingham =

US Navy attack transport

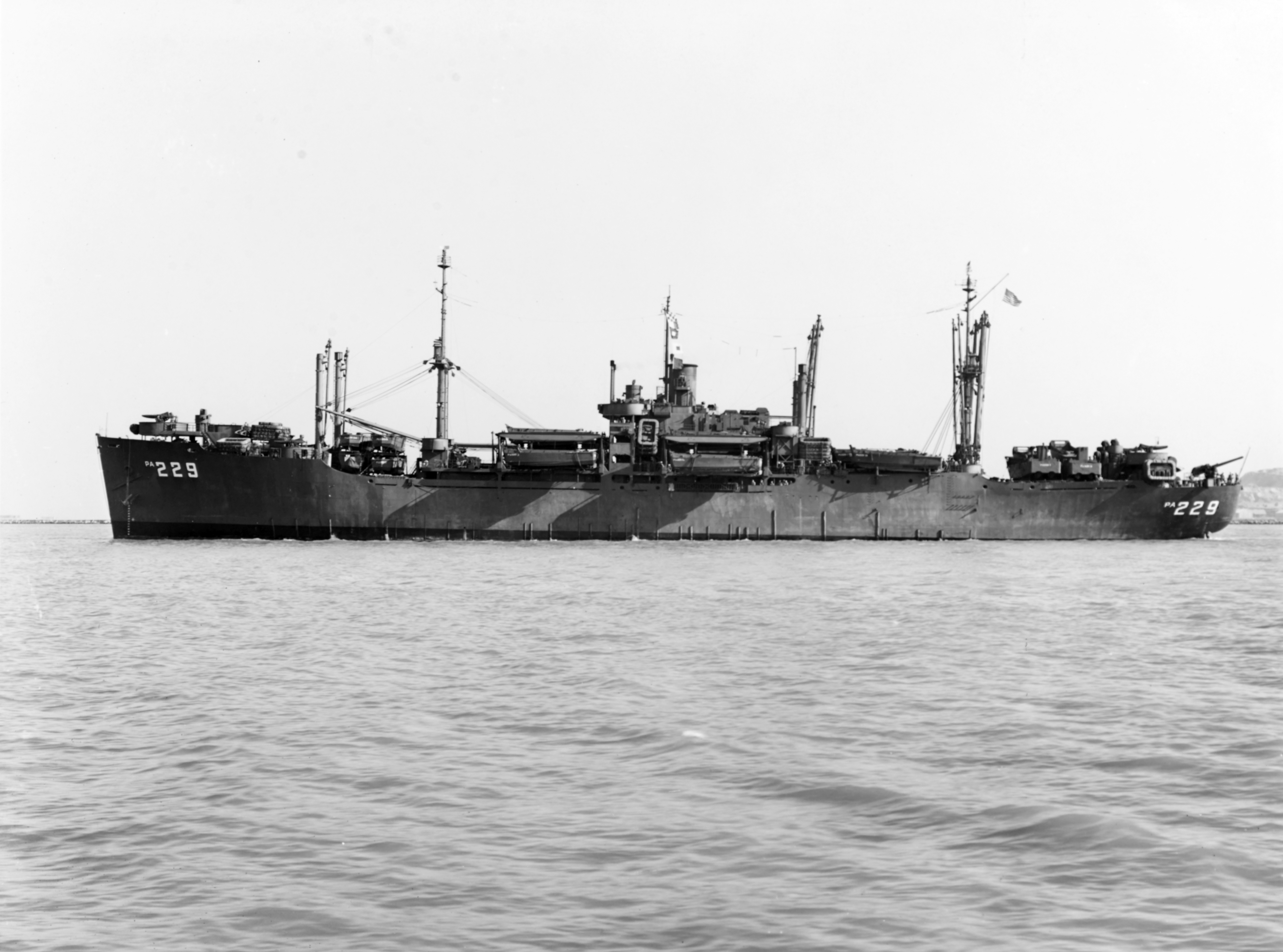

History

United States
- Name: USS Rockingham (APA-229)
- Namesake: Rockingham County, New Hampshire; Rockingham County, North Carolina; Rockingham County, Virginia
- Ordered: as type VC2-S-AP5
- Laid down: 11 September 1944
- Launched: 1 November 1944
- Completed: 22 November 1944
- Acquired: 22 November 1944
- Commissioned: 22 November 1944
- Decommissioned: 17 March 1947
- Reclassified: Amphibious Transport (LPA-229), 1 January 1969
- Stricken: 1 October 1958
- Fate: Sold for scrap, 2 October 1979

General characteristics
- Class & type: VC2-S-AP3 Victory ship
- Type: Troop Transport
- Tonnage: 7612 GRT, 4,553 NRT
- Displacement: 12,450 tons (full load)
- Length: 455 ft 0 in (138.68 m)
- Beam: 62 ft 0 in (18.90 m)
- Draught: 24 ft 0 in (7.32 m)
- Installed power: 8,500 shp (6,300 kW)
- Propulsion: HP & LP turbines geared to a single 20.5-foot (6.2 m) propeller
- Speed: 17 knots
- Troops: 87 Officers; 1,475 Enlisted
- Complement: 536
- Armament: 1 × 5 inch (127 mm)/38 caliber gun; four twin 40 mm gun AA gun mounts; one quad 40mm AA gun mount; 10 × 20 mm Oerlikon

USS Rockingham (APA/LPA-229) was a Haskell-class attack transport in service with the United States Navy from 1944 to 1947. She was scrapped in 1979.

== History ==
Rockingham was laid down as Victory ship 11 September 1944 by Kaiser Shipbuilding Corp., Vancouver, Washington; launched 1 November 1944; sponsored by Mrs. Lynn Norman Carlson; acquired by the Navy from the Maritime Commission on a loan-charter basis and commissioned at Astoria, Oregon, 22 November 1944.

=== World War II ===
Following trials at Seattle, Washington, and shakedown off San Pedro, California, Rockingham reported to the U.S. Pacific Fleet on 30 December 1944. After amphibious training off the southern California coast, she was underway on 16 February 1945 from San Diego, California, with cargo for Pearl Harbor. Following further training exercises in the Hawaiian Islands, she steamed on 10 March for Eniwetok and Saipan with over a thousand U.S. Army men. Operating in the Marianas until 15 April, she departed Saipan with over 1,200 troops and officers for Ulithi and Okinawa.

==== Battle of Okinawa ====
On 26 April she debarked her troops at Okinawa. On 27 April, Rockingham experienced the first of many enemy air attacks, witnessing the sinking by a suicide Kamikaze plane of nearby SS Canada Victory. The next morning, Rockingham joined USS New Mexico (BB-40) in splashing a kamikaze. On 1 May Rockingham sent boats to assist USS Terror (CM-5), hit and badly damaged by a suicide plane, taking on board 55 casualties. On 4 May she got underway in convoy for Ulithi, Pearl Harbor, and San Francisco. There she loaded over 1,300 troops and got underway on 6 June for Eniwetok, Ulithi, and Manila where she debarked her passengers.

=== Post-war ===
Returning to San Francisco, California, on 28 July she loaded some 1,600 Army troops and got underway on 14 August, the first U.S. naval vessel to leave San Francisco Bay following the announcement of peace. She proceeded to Eniwetok, Ulithi and Manila where she debarked her troops. Embarking 1,500 new Army troops there, she got underway on 17 September for Japan. After unloading troops on the Tokyo Plain, she proceeded to Leyte and Samar to pick up veterans and returned to San Francisco, on 5 November. She then made another "Operation Magic Carpet" run to the Philippines reaching Los Angeles, California, on 23 December.

==== Operation Crossroads ====
Remaining on the U.S. West Coast until 11 March, she steamed for Eniwetok and Kwajalein to participate in the Joint Task Force 1 atomic bomb tests. Returning to San Francisco by way of Pearl Harbor on 29 April, she was back at Pearl on 14 May. Proceeding on to Kwajalein and Bikini Atoll where she arrived on 1 June, she returned to Pearl Harbor briefly on 11 June, then steamed back to Bikini and Kwajalein before finally steaming for Pearl Harbor and San Francisco, where she arrived on 12 September 1946.

=== Decommissioning and fate ===
She was detached from Operation Crossroads, on 14 September 1946; and, following radiological clearance, reported to the U.S. 19th Fleet on 5 December 1946. She was placed out of commission in the Pacific Reserve Fleet at San Francisco on 17 March 1947. The Commander, Columbia River Group, accepted custody of Rockingham from the Commander, San Francisco Group, on 18 June 1953. She was transferred to the Maritime Administration at Astoria, Oregon, on 26 September 1958 and struck from the Navy list on 1 October 1958. She was scrapped by Don Kur Steel Corporation of South Korea. Removed from Maritime Administration records 19 November 1979.

== Awards ==
Rockingham earned one battle star for World War II service.
