= SS Rutland Victory =

Victory ship of the United States

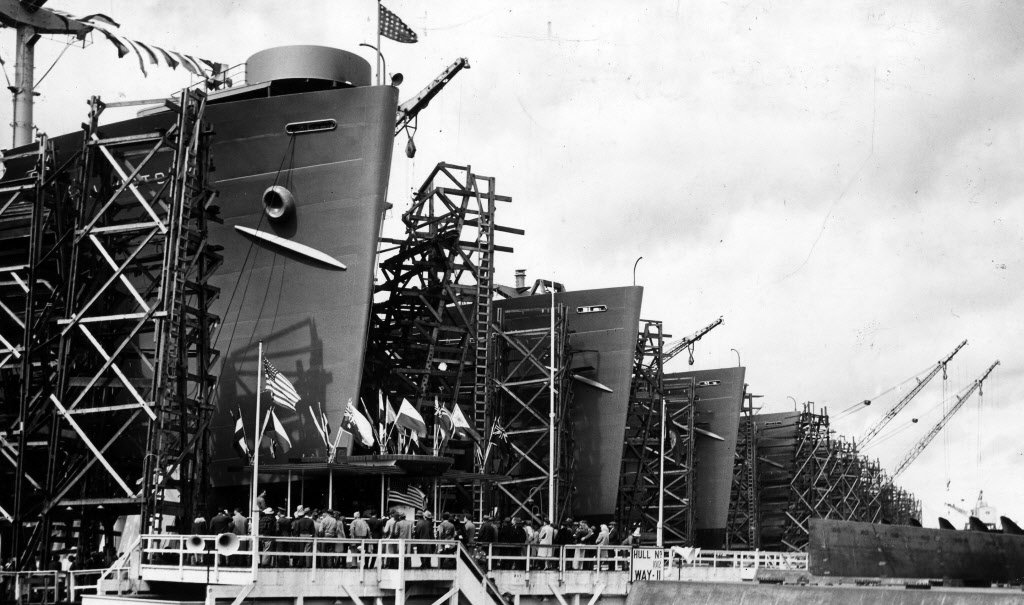
- Rutland Victory and sister ships at the Oregon Shipbuilding Company in Portland, Oregon

History

United States
- Name: Rutland Victory
- Namesake: Rutland, Vermont
- Owner: War Shipping Administration
- Operator: United States Lines
- Builder: Oregon Shipbuilding Company
- Laid down: March 20, 1944
- Launched: May 9, 1944
- Sponsored by: Mrs. Ada May Brannon
- Christened: May 19, 1944
- Completed: May 29, 1944
- Fate: Sold to private use, sank in 1976

General characteristics
- Class & type: VC2-S-AP3 Victory ship
- Tonnage: 7612 GRT, 4,553 NRT
- Displacement: 15,200 tons
- Length: 455 ft (139 m)
- Beam: 62 ft (19 m)
- Draft: 28 ft (8.5 m)
- Installed power: 8,500 shp (6,300 kW)
- Propulsion: HP & LP turbines geared to a single 20.5-foot (6.2 m) propeller
- Speed: 16.5 knots
- Boats & landing craft carried: 4 Lifeboats
- Complement: 62 Merchant Marine and 28 US Naval Armed Guards
- Armament: 1 × 5 inch (127 mm)/38 caliber gun; 1 × 3 inch (76 mm)/50 caliber gun; 8 × 20 mm Oerlikon

SS Rutland Victory was a Victory ship built during World War II under the Emergency Shipbuilding program. It was built and launched by the Oregon Shipbuilding Corporation on May 9, 1944, and completed on May 29, 1944. The ship's United States Maritime Commission designation was VC2-S-AP3 and hull number 104 (1020). The ship was Oregon Shipbuilding Corporation's 20th victory ship. The Maritime Commission turned it over for Merchant navy operation to a civilian contractor, the United States Lines.

Mrs. Ada May Brannor, of La Grande, Oregon, christened the SS Rutland Victory. She worked at the Oregon Shipbuilding Corporation yard on the swing shift. Mrs. Brannor was given a gold jewel case with her name and the ship engraved on it.

== World War II ==
In 1944, for the vessel's first mission, the Rutland Victory took ammunition from Washington, D.C., to Pearl Harbor.

On August 29, 1944, the Rutland Victory transferred cargo to and from the USS Massachusetts (BB-59) at Enewetak Atoll. Task force 38 was at the Enewetak Atoll in August 1944 and the Rutland Victory delivered cargo and goods to the Task force. In May 1945, she traveled from California to Iwo Jima with 82 days-worth of supplies for the American troops stationed at Iwo Jima for the purpose of preparing them for the Battle of Okinawa, lasting from April 1 to June 22, 1945. After the war she moved to ports where supplies were required.

== Honors ==
Rutland Victory earned Battle Stars for combat action from June 17, 1945, to June 30, 1945, at the Battle of Okinawa at Okinawa in the Pacific Ocean. On those days, the Rutland Victory used its deck guns to defend itself and other ships from Japanese Kamikaze plane attacks.

== Film ==
A short film about the Panama Canal featured the Rushville Victory crossing was made entitled "Ocean to Ocean: Panama Canal"; it shows the crossing of the Rushville Victory through the Panama canal to demonstrate how the canal worked. The film is now part of a DVD titled "USN Oil Tankers Supply and Cargo Ships" by Campbell films, with a running time of 8:10 min.

== Private use ==
In 1948, the SS Rutland Victory was sold to the American President Lines of San Francisco and renamed the SS President Fillmore. In 1962, the boat was sold to Victory Shipping Enterprises Inc. from Wilmington, Delaware and renamed SS Smith Victory. In 1965, Victory Shipping Enterprises renamed it the SS US Victory. The vessel was later sold to Transpacific Container Services of Liberia in 1969 and renamed the SS Oriental Arrow. In 1969, Transpacific Container Services converted it to a 7,511 g.t. container ship and in 1972, it was sold to Universal Enterprise Inc. of Monrovia, Liberia, and renamed the SS Oriental Ace.

In 1976, the Oriental Ace sank. The SS Oriental Ace, operating as a Liberian container ship, started to leak in rough seas on its way from Seattle to Kobe, Japan. The crew abandoned ship into the lifeboats and it sank on February 13, 1976, at 32.05N 152.43E, 600 miles East of Tokyo, Japan.

== Sources ==
- Sawyer, L.A. and W.H. Mitchell. Victory ships and tankers: The history of the 'Victory' type cargo ships and of the tankers built in the United States of America during World War II, Cornell Maritime Press, 1974, 0-87033-182-5.
- United States Maritime Commission:
- Victory Cargo Ships
