= USS Antrim (AK-159) =

Cargo ship of the United States Navy

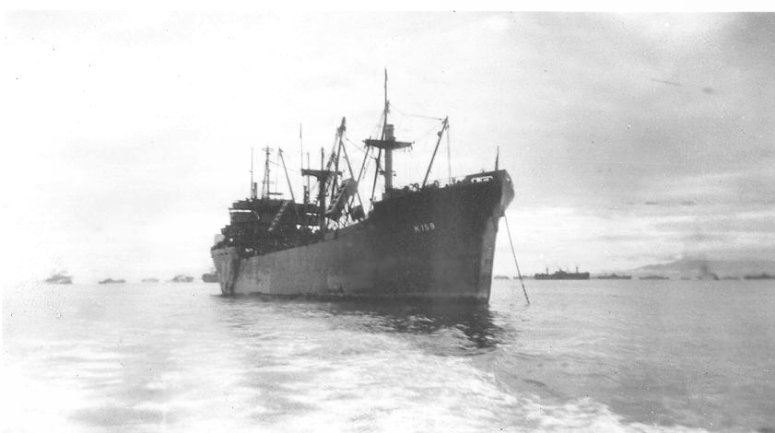
- USS Antrim (AK-159) at anchor, date and location unknown

History

United States
- Name: Antrim
- Namesake: Antrim County, Michigan
- Ordered: as type (C1-M-AV1) hull, MC hull 2104
- Builder: Kaiser Shipyard's Richmond Shipyard, Richmond, California
- Yard number: 61
- Laid down: 18 April 1944
- Launched: 17 July 1944
- Sponsored by: Mrs. F. H. Horstman
- Commissioned: 31 October 1944
- Decommissioned: 3 April 1946
- Stricken: 17 April 1946
- Identification: Hull symbol: AK-159; Code letters: NEUQ
- Fate: Sold, 13 January 1947

Turkey
- Name: Kars
- Namesake: Province of Kars
- Owner: Deniz Nakliyati T.A.O., Turkey
- Acquired: 13 January 1947
- Home port: Istanbul, Turkey
- Identification: IMO number: 5182748
- Fate: Scrapped in January 1983 at Aliağa, Turkey

General characteristics
- Class & type: Alamosa-class cargo ship
- Type: C1-M-AV1
- Tonnage: 5,032 long tons deadweight (DWT)
- Displacement: 2,382 long tons (2,420 t) (standard); 7,450 long tons (7,570 t) (full load)
- Length: 388 ft 8 in (118.47 m)
- Beam: 50 ft (15 m)
- Draft: 21 ft 1 in (6.43 m)
- Installed power: 1 × Nordberg, TSM 6 diesel engine; 1,750 shp (1,300 kW)
- Propulsion: 1 × propeller
- Speed: 11.5 kn (21.3 km/h; 13.2 mph)
- Capacity: 3,945 t (3,883 long tons) DWT; 9,830 cu ft (278 m^{3}) (refrigerated); 227,730 cu ft (6,449 m^{3}) (non-refrigerated)
- Complement: 15 Officers; 70 Enlisted
- Armament: 1 × 3 in (76 mm)/50 caliber dual purpose gun (DP); 6 × 20 mm (0.8 in) Oerlikon anti-aircraft (AA) cannons

USS Antrim (AK-159) was an Alamosa-class cargo ship in the United States Navy. She was named for Antrim County, Michigan.

== Construction ==
The first Antrim was laid down under a Maritime Commission contract, MC hull 2104, on 18 April 1944, at the Richmond Shipyard, Richmond, California, by Kaiser Cargo, Inc.; launched on 17 July 1944; sponsored by Mrs. F. H. Horstman; and, after her delivery to and acceptance by the Navy on 31 October 1944, was commissioned the same day.

== Service history ==
After the completion of her fitting out, Antrim conducted her shakedown training out of San Pedro, Los Angeles, completing this by 13 December. Subsequently, pushing on for Hawaii, she reached Pearl Harbor on New Year's Day, 1945, but got underway again three days later, bound for the Western Pacific. After calling at Eniwetok, Ulithi, and Kossol Roads, Antrim reached Leyte on 9 February to unload her cargo.

Operating under the aegis of Service Squadron 9 through the end of the war with Japan, the vessel carried cargo between Manus, in the Admiralty Islands, and Philippine ports. She conducted three such voyages during the periods from 19 March to 27 April; from 30 May to 22 June; and from 6 to 30 August. After supporting the occupation of Japan through the autumn, Antrim departed the Western Pacific on 4 January 1946 and proceeded singly to the Panama Canal Zone, reaching Cristobal on 20 February. Ultimately, Antrim arrived at Norfolk, Virginia, on 4 March where she decommissioned on 3 April.

Delivered to the War Shipping Administration (WSA) three days later, Antrim's name was struck from the Navy list on 17 April 1946. Records indicate that the ship briefly operated under the United States flag, with the firm of Dichmann, Wright & Pugh, Inc. of San Francisco, California, in 1947, before being transferred to Turkish registry the following year. Renamed Kars and homeported at Istanbul, Turkey, the erstwhile Navy cargo ship operated under the Turkish flag into the 1980s.

== Bibliography ==
- "Antrim I (AK-159)". Dictionary of American Naval Fighting Ships. Naval History and Heritage Command. 18 June 2015.
- "C1 Cargo Ships". ShipbuildingHistory.com. 28 August 2009.
- "USS Antrim (AK-159)". NavSource. 11 July 2014.
