= List of Liberty ships (G) =

This is a list of Liberty ships with names beginning with G.

== Description ==
The standard Liberty ship (EC-2-S-C1 type) was a cargo ship 441 feet 6 inches (134.57 m) long overall, with a beam of 56 feet 10 3/4 inches (17.34 m). It had a depth of 37 feet 4 inches (11.38 m) and a draft of 26 feet 10 inches (8.18 m). It was powered by a triple expansion steam engine, which had cylinders of 24 1/2 inches (62 cm), 37 inches (94 cm) and 70 inches (180 cm) diameter by 48 inches (120 cm) stroke. The engine produced 2,500ihp at 76rpm. Driving a four-blade propeller 18 feet 6 inches (5.64 m) in diameter, could propel the ship at 11 knots (20 km/h).

Cargo was carried in five holds, numbered 1–5 from bow to stern. Grain capacity was 84,183 cubic feet (2,383.8 m^{3}), 145,604 cubic feet (4,123.0 m^{3}), 96,429 cubic feet (2,730.6 m^{3}), 93,190 cubic feet (2,639 m^{3}) and 93,190 cubic feet (2,639 m^{3}), with a further 49,086 cubic feet (1,390.0 m^{3}) in the deep tanks. Bale capacity was 75,405 cubic feet (2,135.2 m^{3}), 134,638 cubic feet (3,812.5 m^{3}), 83,697 cubic feet (2,370.0 m^{3}), 82,263 cubic feet (2,329.4 m^{3}) and 82,435 cubic feet (2,334.3 m^{3}), with a further 41,135 cubic feet (1,164.8 m^{3}) in the deep tanks.

It carried a crew of 45, plus 36 United States Navy Armed Guard gunners. Later in the war, this was altered to a crew of 52, plus 29 gunners. Accommodation was in a three deck superstructure placed midships. The galley was equipped with a range, a 25 US gallons (95 L) stock kettle and other appliances. Messrooms were equipped with an electric hot plate and an electric toaster.

== Gabriel Duvall ==
Gabriel Duvall was built by California Shipbuilding Corporation, Terminal Island, Los Angeles, California. Her keel was laid on 11 September 1942. She was launched on 13 October and delivered on 31 October. She was scrapped at Terminal Island in 1962.

== Gabriel Franchere ==
Gabriel Franchere was built by Oregon Shipbuilding Corporation, Portland, Oregon, and named for Gabriel Franchère. Her keel was laid on 27 November 1943. She was launched on 12 December and delivered on 29 December. Built for the War Shipping Administration (WSA), she was operated under the management of Isthmian Steamship Company. To the French Government in 1946, operated under the management of Compagnie Générale Transatlantique. Renamed Argentan in 1947. Management transferred to Sociètè Navale Delmas-Vieljeux in 1954. She was scrapped at Barcelona, Spain in June 1971.

== Galen L. Stone ==
Galen L. Stone was built by New England Shipbuilding Corporation, South Portland, Maine. Her keel was laid on 13 July 1944. She was launched on 31 August and delivered on 15 September. Built for the WSA, she was operated under the management of Eastern Steamship Co. Management transferred to Fall River Steamship Co., Fall River, Massachusetts in 1946. Sold to her managers in 1947, renamed Yankee Star in 1948. Sold to Dolphin Steamship Co., New York later that year. Renamed Demostar in 1949 and placed under the management of Triton Shipping Inc. Renamed Oceanstar in 1950. Sold in 1960 to Proteus Shipping Co. and renamed Pyrgos. Reflagged to Greece, remaining under the same management. Sold in 1960 to Synthia Shipping Co., Panama. Reflagged to Liberia and operated under the management of Nereus Shipping. She was scrapped at Kaohsiung, Taiwan in February 1967.

== Gaspar de Portola ==
Gaspar de Portola was built by California Shipbuilding Corporation. Her keel was laid on 3 November 1942. She was launched on 4 December and delivered on 12 December. Built for the WSA, she was operated under the management of Lykes Brothers Steamship Company. She ran aground on the Quita Sueno Reef, in the Caribbean Sea on 7 June 1943 whilst on a voyage from Panama to Key West, Florida. She was refloated on 31 July and towed to Savannah, Georgia, where she was declared a constructive total loss. She was towed to Baltimore, Maryland in December 1946 for use as a fire prevention training hulk by the United States Coast Guard at Fort McHenry. She was scrapped at Baltimore in 1948.

== General Vallejo ==
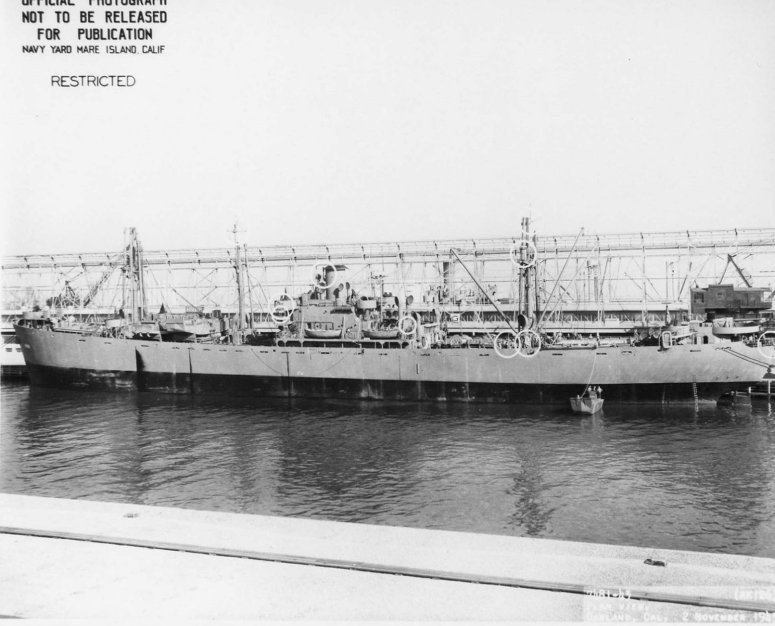
USS Megrez

General Vallejo was built by California Shipbuilding Corporation. Her keel was laid on 31 March 1943. She was launched 23 April and delivered on 6 May. To the United States Navy in October 1943 and renamed Megrez. Converted for naval use at Bethlehem Steel Co., San Francisco, California. Returned to United States Maritime Commission (USMC) in September 1947 and laid up in Suisun Bay. She was sold to shipbreakers in Portland, Oregon in June 1974.

== George Abernethy ==
George Abernethy was built by Oregon Shipbuilding Corporation, and named for George Abernethy. Her keel was laid on 29 May 1942. She was launched on 11 July and delivered on 25 July. She was scrapped at Baltimore in October 1960.

== George A. Custer ==
George A. Custer was built by California Shipbuilding Corporation. Her keel was laid on 15 August 1942. She was launched on 23 September and delivered on 10 October. She was scrapped at Seattle, Washington in 1961.

== George Ade ==
George Ade was built by J. A. Jones Construction Company, Panama City, Florida. Her keel was laid on 30 June 1944. She was launched on 9 August and delivered on 25 August. Built for the WSA, she was operated under the management of American-West African Line. Torpedoed and damaged in the Atlantic Ocean off the coast of North Carolina by U-518 on 12 September 1944 whilst on a voyage from Mobile, Alabama to the United Kingdom. She was towed to Chesapeake Bay. Subsequently repaired. Laid up in reserve post-war, she was scrapped at Panama City, Florida in September 1968.

== George A. Lawson ==
George A. Lawson was built by New England Shipbuilding Corporation. Her keel was laid on 14 December 1944. She was launched on 21 February 1945 and delivered on 13 March. Built for the WSA, she was operated under the management of West India Steamship Inc. Management transferred to Sword Line Inc. in 1946. Laid up in the James River in 1948. She was sold in 1951 to Pacific Range Steamship Corp., New York. Sold in 1952 to Pan Oceanic Navigation Corp., New York. Sold in 1957 to Drycargo Shipping Corp. and renamed Penn Mariner. Reflagged to Liberia and operated under the management of Penn Shipping Co. Sold in 1958 to Penntrans Co., New York and reflagged to the United States. Sold in 1961 to Union Navigation Corp and Reflagged to Panama. Sprang a leak and sank in the Indian Ocean 270 nautical miles (500 km) north east of Ceylon (12°07′N 85°38′E) on 20 June 1964 whilst on a voyage from Calcutta, India to Kobe, Japan.

== George A. Marr ==
George A. Marr was built by Delta Shipbuilding Company. Her keel was laid on 10 January 1944. She was launched on 27 February and delivered on 22 March. Built for the WSA, she was operated under the management of Overlakes Freight Corp. Sold in 1947 to M. Kulukundis and renamed Stathes J. Yannaghas. Reflagged to Greece. Sold later that year to Kassos Steam Navigation Co., Syra, Greece. Operated under the management of Rethymnis. Sold in 1951 to Paroh Steamship Co. and renamed Ania. Operated under the management of I. & A. Pezas. Sold in 1953 to I. K. & I. Pezas. Sold in 1956 to Pelops Maritime Co. Operated under the management of World Tramping Agencies. Sold in 1959 to Yukun Compania Navigation, Panama and renamed Grammatiki. Remained under the Greek flag and operated under the management of Martran Steamship Co. Sprang a leak in the Pacific Ocean (40°38′N 159°31′W) on 7 February 1965 whilst on a voyage from Tacoma to Formosa. She sank the next day.

== George A. Pope ==
George A. Pope was built by Permanente Metals Corporation, Richmond, California. Her keel was laid on 1 February 1944. She was launched on 20 February and delivered on 28 February. Built for the WSA, she was operated under the management of Pope & Talbot Inc. Sold in 1946 to Pacific Maritime Co., Panama and renamed Pacific Ocean. Operated under the management of Dow & Symmers. Management transferred to Nomikos in 1949. Sold in 1952 to Transvaal Compania Navigation, Panama and renamed Aliki P. Reflagged to Honduras and operated under the management of Paular Maritime Co., New York. Sold to her managers in 1953, then sold the next year to Transolas Compania Navigation, Panama. Reflagged to Greece and placed under the management of Paular Maritime Co. Sold in 1955 to Antarios Compania Navigation, Panama and renamed Panagiotis Xilas. Reflagged to Liberia and operated under the management of A. Lusi Ltd. Reflagged to Lebanon in 1962. Sold in 1963 to Razani Compania Navigation, Panama and renamed Razani. Remained under the Lebanese flag and same management. She was scrapped at Onomichi, Japan in August 1963.

== George Bancroft ==
George Bancroft was built by California Shipbuilding Corporation. Her keel was laid on 3 June 1942. She was launched on 15 July and delivered on 4 August. She was scrapped at Baltimore in February 1960.

== George B. Cortelyou ==
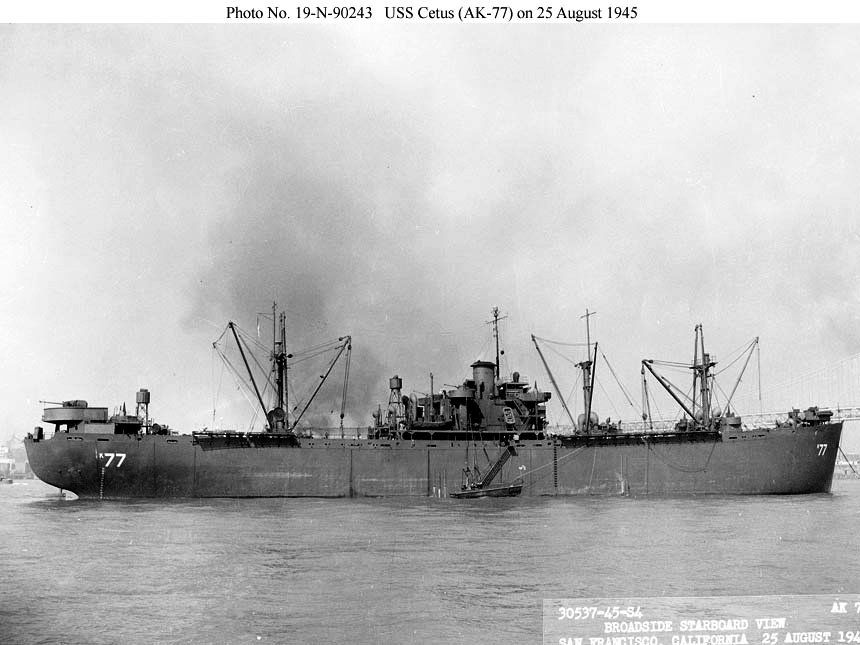
USS Cetus

George B. Cortelyou was built by Permanente Metals Corporation. Her keel was laid on 21 November 1942. She was launched on 26 December and delivered on 4 January 1943. To the United States Navy and renamed Cetus. To WSA in November 1945. Renamed George B. Cortelyou and laid up in the James River. She was scrapped at Bilbao, Spain in March 1972.

== George Bellows ==
George Bellows was built by Todd Houston Shipbuilding Corporation. Her keel was laid on 7 July 1943. She was launched on 21 August and delivered on 4 September. Built for the WSA, she was operated under the management of R. A. Nicol & Co. Sold in 1947 to Goulandris Bros., London, United Kingdom and renamed Evanthia. Sold the next year to P. J. Goulandris Sons, Piraeus, Greece. Operated under the management of Capeside Steamship Co. Sold in 1958 to United Shipping & Trading Co. of Greece, Piraeus. Sold in 1960 to Staco Compania Maritima, Panama and renamed Evie. Remained under the Greek flag and operated under the management of D. J. Negroponte. Sold in 1965 to Deko Trading SA, Panama and renamed Albino. Reflagged to Liberia and operated under the management of Olympic Maritime SA. Sold in 1967 to Orcades Maritime Financiera Panama, Panama. Remained under the Liberian flag. She was scrapped at Bilbao in December 1969.

== George Berkeley ==
George Berkeley was built by Permanente Metals Corporation. Her keel was laid on 10 May 1942. She was launched on 2 June and delivered on 14 June. She was scrapped at Kobe in December 1960.

== George B. McClellan ==
George B. McClellan was built by Permanente Metals Corporation. Her keel was laid on 16 February 1942. She was launched on 6 June and delivered on 27 June. Laid up at Beaumont, Texas post-war, she was scrapped at Brownsville, Texas in October 1973.

== George B. McFarland ==
George B. McFarland was built by Permanente Metals Corporation. Her keel was laid on 1 May 1944. She was launched on 21 May and delivered on 29 May. She was scrapped at New Orleans, Louisiana in March 1964.

== George B. Porter ==
George B. Porter was built by Permanente Metals Corporation. Her keel was laid on 6 December 1943. She was launched on 24 December and delivered on 31 December. Built for the WSA, she was operated under the management of Pope & Talbot Inc. Sold in 1947 to Garibaldi Società Co-op di Navigazione a Resp. Ltda, Genoa, Italy and renamed Aspromonte. She was scrapped at La Spezia, Italy in October 1966.

== George B. Selden ==
George B. Selden was built by Permanente Metals Corporation. Her keel was laid on 29 September 1942. She was launched on 9 November and delivered on 16 November. She was scrapped at Tsuneishi, Japan in December 1960.

== George C. Childress ==
George C. Childress was built by Todd Houston Shipbuilding Corporation. Her keel was laid on 25 May 1943. She was launched on 5 July and delivered on 17 July. Built for the WSA, she was operated under the management of Grace Line Inc. Sold in 1947 to Hadjipateras, Piraeus and renamed Hadjipateras. Ran aground off Koronje Island, Burma (16°32′N 94°14′E) and sank on 27 July 1967 whilst on a voyage from Calcutta to Rangoon, Burma.

== George C. Yount ==
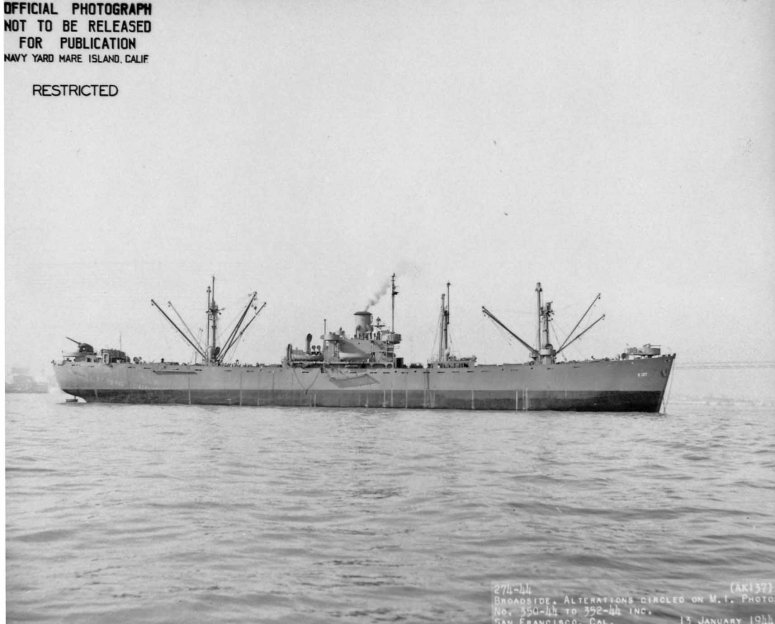
USS Ascella

George C. Yount was built by California Shipbuilding Corporation. Her keel was laid on 7 January 1943. She was launched as George C. Yount on 4 February and delivered to the United States Navy as Ascella on 21 February. Decommissioned at Pearl Harbor, Hawaii in August 1946. Returned to USMC in May 1947 and renamed George C. Yount. Towed to San Francisco and laid up in Suisun Bay. She was scrapped at Terminal Island in June 1964.

== George Calvert (I) ==
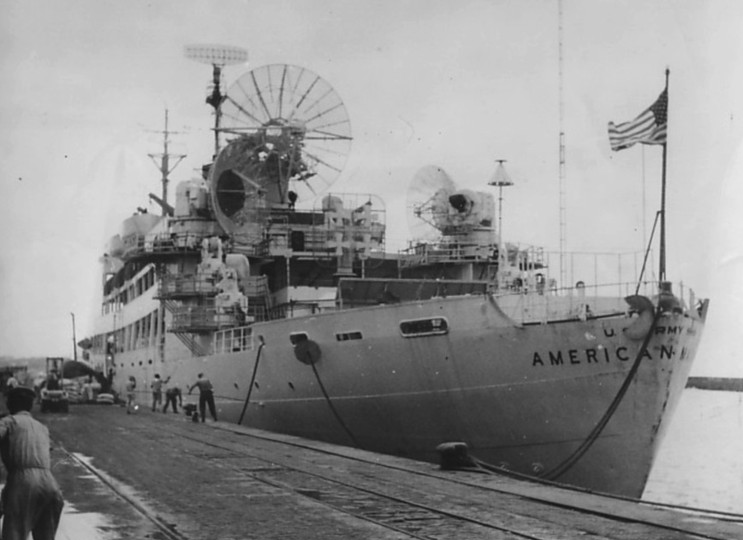
USAS American Mariner

George Calvert was built by Bethlehem Fairfield Shipyard. Her keel was laid on 15 August 1941. She was launched on 30 December. Incomplete hull finished at Baltimore as American Mariner for United States Coast Guard maritime training service. Subsequently transferred to United States Army and later to United States Army Air Force. Converted at Brooklyn Naval Yard in 1961 to a Missile Range Ship. To the United States Navy in January 1964. Decommissioned on 1 July 1966, she was scuttled as a target ship in Chesapeake Bay in October 1966.

== George Calvert (II) ==
George Calvert was built by Bethlehem Fairfield Shipyard. Her keel was laid on 19 November 1941. She was launched on 14 March and delivered on 30 April. Built for the WSA, she was operated under the management of A. H. Bull & Co. She was torpedoed and damaged off the coast of Cuba (22°55′N 84°26′W) by U-753 on 20 May 1942 whilst on a voyage from Baltimore to Bandar Shapur, Iran. She consequently broke in three and sank.

== George Chaffey ==
George Chaffey was built by California Shipbuilding Corporation. Her keel was laid on 18 October 1942. She was launched on 18 November and delivered on 8 December. To the United States Navy in December 1953. Subsequently, laid up at Mobile, she was scrapped at Panama City, Florida in February 1972.

== George Chamberlain ==
George Chamberlain was built by Oregon Shipbuilding Corporation. Her keel was laid on 7 July 1942. She was launched on 14 August and delivered on 26 August. To the United States Navy in December 1953. Subsequently, laid up in the Hudson River. She was sold to shipbreakers in Karachi, Pakistan in December 1970. Resold, she was scrapped at Bilbao in October 1972.

== George Cleeve ==
George Cleeve was built by New England Shipbuilding Corporation. Her keel was laid on 4 May 1943. She was launched on 23 June and delivered on 30 June. Built for the WSA, she was operated under the management of American Export Lines. She was torpedoed and damaged in the Mediterranean Sea off Bône, Algeria by U-969 on 22 February 1944 and was beached. She was salvaged in 1952 and scrapped at Savona, Italy.

== George Clement Perkins ==
George Clement Perkins was built by Permanente Metals Corporation. Her keel was laid on 1 April 1944. She was launched on 20 April and delivered on 28 April. Built for the WSA, she was operated under the management of Weyerhauser Steamship Co. Management transferred to T. J. Stevenson & Co. in 1946. Laid up at Olympia, Washington in 1948. Sold in 1951 to Excelsior Steamship Corp. and renamed Seamonitor. Operated under the management of Orion Shipping & Trading Co. Sold in 1957 to Grainfleet Inc. and renamed Grain Trader. Operated under the management of Grainfleet Steamship Co. Sold in 1958 to Herald Steamship Corp. and renamed Maria H. Operated under the management of Seaways Shipping Corp. Sold in 1962 to Seagate Steamship Co. and renamed Mount Rainier. Operated under the management of Suwannee Steamship Co. Lengthened at Tokyo, Japan in 1962. Now 511 feet 6 inches (155.91 m) and 8,584 GRT. Management transferred to A. H. Bull & Co. later that year. Sold in 1963 to Gloria Steamship Co. and renamed Duval, remaining under the same management. She was scrapped at Kaohsiung in August 1969.

== George Clymer ==
George Clymer was built by Oregon Shipbuilding Corporation. Her keel was laid on 26 November 1941. She was launched on 19 February 1942 and delivered on 8 April. Built for the WSA, she was operated under the management of American Export Lines. She suffered a broken propeller shaft 600 nautical miles (1,100 km) south west of Ascension Island on 30 May 1942 whilst on a voyage from Portland, Oregon to Cape Town, Union of South Africa. After drifting for a week, she was attacked by a motor torpedo boat from the German auxiliary cruiser Michel. She was abandoned and capsized. Shelled by HMS Alcantara on 7 June (at 14°32′S 20°31′W), she subsequently sank.

== George Coggeshall ==
George Coggeshall was built by Permanente Metals Corporation. Her keel was laid on 14 February 1944. She was launched on as George Coggeshall 17 March and delivered as Sukhona on 15 April. To the Soviet Union under Lend-Lease. She was scrapped at Castellón de la Plana, Spain in June 1971.

== George Crile ==
George Crile was built by Permanente Metals Corporation. Her keel was laid on 27 April 1944. She was launched on 17 May and delivered on 26 May. Laid up in the James River post-war, she was scrapped at Panama City, Florida in November 1972.

== George Davidson ==
George Davidson was built by Oregon Shipbuilding Corporation. Her keel was laid on 5 May 1943. She was launched on 25 May and delivered on 2 June. She was scrapped at Baltimore in March 1962.

== George Davis ==
George Davis was built by North Carolina Shipbuilding Company. Her keel was laid on 29 November 1942. She was launched on 30 December and delivered on 13 January 1943. She was scrapped at Baltimore in June 1960.

== George Dewey ==
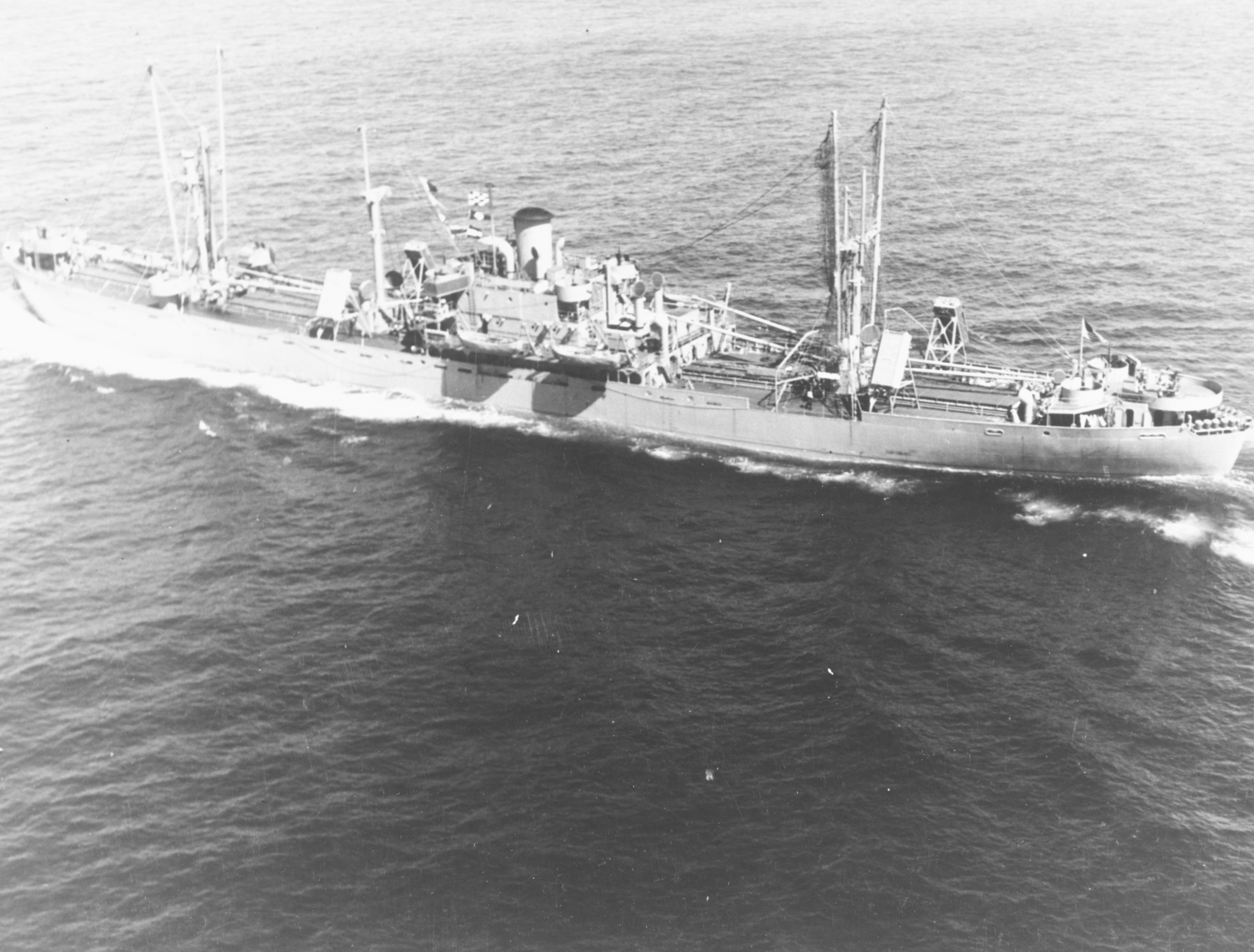
George Dewey

George Dewey was built by St. Johns River shipbuilding Company. Her keel was laid on 8 May 1943. She was launched on 5 August and delivered on 27 August. She was scuttled off Port Mansfield, Texas on 25 April 1976.

== George D. Prentice ==
George D. Prentice was built by Permanente Metals Corporation. Her keel was laid on 4 March 1943. She was launched on 7 April and delivered on 21 April. Used as a grain storage ship in 1954. She was scrapped at Portland, Oregon in November 1969.

== George Durant ==
George Durant was built by North Carolina Shipbuilding Company. Her keel was laid on 9 July 1943. She was launched on 7 August and delivered on 15 August. She was scrapped at Philadelphia in July 1961.

== George Eastman ==
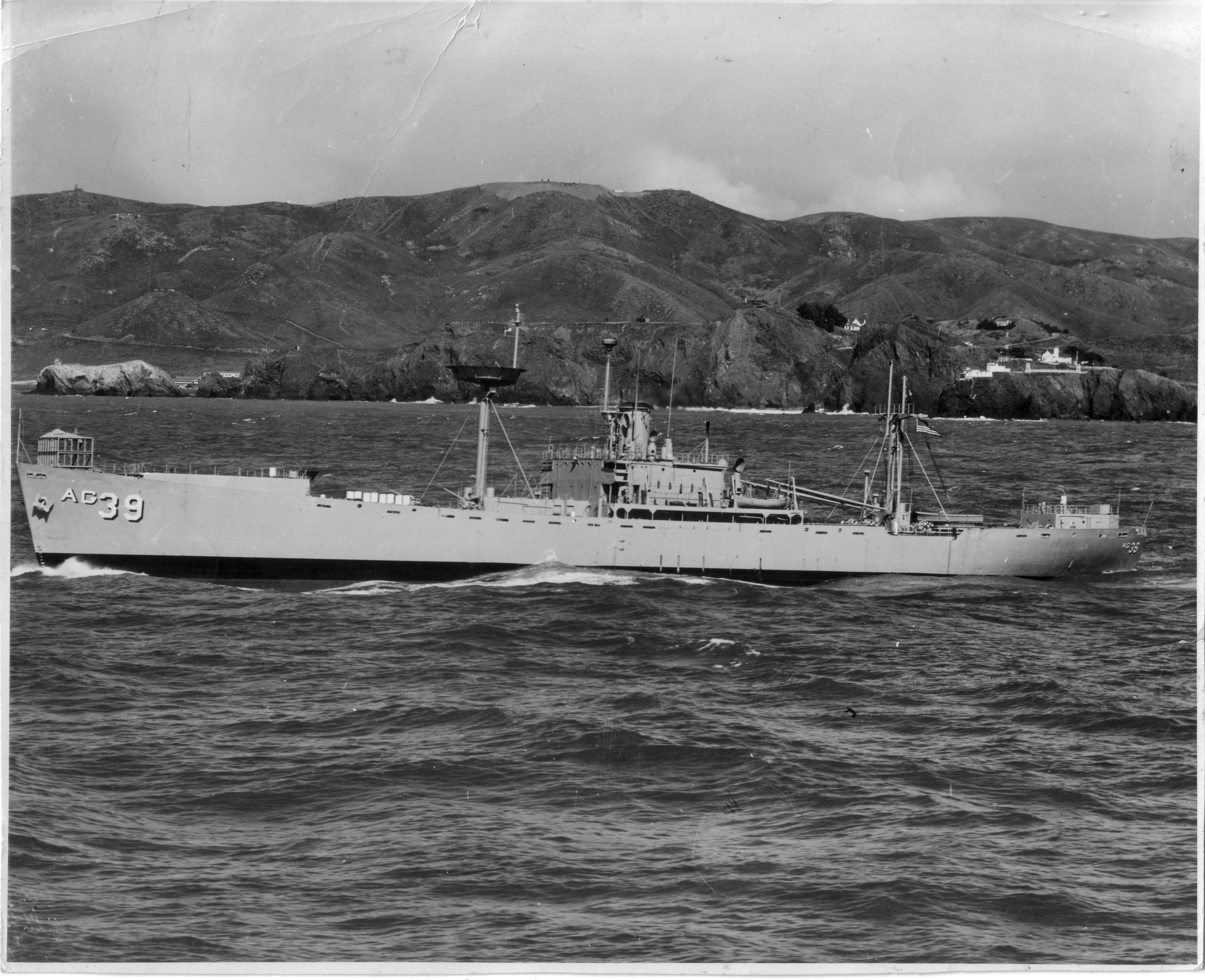
YAG-39

George Eastman was built by Permanente Metals Corporation. Her keel was laid on 24 March 1943. She was launched on 20 April and delivered on 5 May. Laid up in Suisun Bay in June 1948. Returned to service in December 1951 due to the Korean War. Transferred to the United States Navy in June 1952. Given the Pennant number YAG-39 but not named. Converted to a monitoring and measuring ship for use in nuclear bomb experiments, capable of being operated remotely. Place in reserve at San Diego, California in October 1957. Recommissioned in 1962. Name George Eastman in July 1963. Subsequently, laid up. She was scrapped at Richmond in February 1977.

== George E. Badger ==
George E. Badger was built by North Carolina Shipbuilding Company. Her keel was laid on 27 December 1942. She was launched on 26 January 1943 and delivered on 6 February. Laid up in the James River post-war, she was scrapped at Alicante, Spain in April 1972.

== George E. Goodfellow ==
George E. Goodfellow was built by Permanente Metals Corporation. Her keel was laid on27 May 1944. She was launched on 17 June and delivered on 30 June. To the Soviet Union and renamed General Panfilov. Arrived at Vladivostok on 28 September 1976 for scrapping.

== George E. Hale ==
George E. Hale was built by California Shipbuilding Corporation. Her keel was laid on 23 December 1942. She was launched on 19 January 1943 and delivered on 6 February. She was scrapped at Bellingham, Washington in September 1961.

== George Eldridge ==
George Eldridge was built by New England Shipbuilding Corporation. Her keel was laid on 6 March 1944. She was launched on 18 April and delivered on 28 April. She was scrapped at Baltimore in 1958.

== George E. Merrick ==
George E. Merrick was built by St. Johns River Shipbuilding Corporation. Her keel was laid on 20 March 1944. She was launched on 4 May and delivered on 21 May. Built for the WSA, she was operated under the management of United States Lines. Laid up in the Hudson River in 1948. Sold in 1951 to Saxon Steamship Corp., New York and renamed Saxon. Sold in 1956 to Aspin Steamship Co. Operated under the management of Isbrandtsen & Co. Sold in 1961 to Guiardo Compania Navigation, Panama and renamed Panagia Kounistra. Reflagged to Greece and operated under the management of Zaharias Sitinas. Sprang a leak in January 1972 whilst on a voyage from Tampa to Manzanillo, Mexico. She put in to Cristobal, Panama. Scrapped at Golden Horn, Turkey in September 1972.

== George E. Pickett ==
George E. Pickett was built by Todd Houston Shipbuilding Corporation. Her keel was laid on 16 February 1943. She was launched on 31 March and delivered on 19 April. Laid up at Wilmington, North Carolina post-war. She was scrapped at Kearny in March 1969.

== George E. Waldo ==
George E. Waldo was built by St. Johns River Shipbuilding Corporation. Her keel was laid on 18 September 1944. She was launched on 23 October and delivered on 31 October. Built for the WSA, she was operated under the management of Shephard Steamship Co. Management transferred to Matson Navigation Co., San Francisco in 1946, then sold to Matson later that year. Renamed Hawaiian Forester in 1947. Sold in 1955 to Weyerhauser Steamship Co, Newark, New Jersey in 1955 and renamed C. R. Musser. Sold in 1969 to Reliance Carriers SA, Panama and renamed Reliance Serenity. Operated under the management of Hong Kong Maritime Co. Sold in 1970 to Luzon Stevedoring Corp., Manila, Philippines and renamed LSCO Bulktrain. She arrived at Kaohsiung for scrapping in February 1974.

== George Flavel ==
George Flavel was built by Oregon Shipbuilding Corporation. Her keel was laid on 11 March 1943. She was launched on 31 March and delivered on 8 April. She was scrapped at Oakland, California in August 1968.

== George F. Patten ==
George F. Patten was built by New England Shipbuilding Corporation. Her keel was laid on 29 March 1943. She was launched on 22 May and delivered on 29 May. She was scrapped at Pusan, South Korea in September 1970.

== George Gale ==
George Gale was built by Delta Shipbuilding Company. Her keel was laid on 1 April 1942. She was launched on 15 July and delivered on 19 August. Laid up in Puget Sound post-war, she was scrapped at Portland, Oregon in January 1970.

== George G. Crawford ==
George G. Crawford was built by J. A. Jones Construction Company, Brunswick. Her keel was laid on 16 November 1943. She was launched on 1 January 1944 and delivered on 13 January. Built for the WSA, she was operated under the management of American Liberty Steamship Co. Sold in 1947 to Rethymnis & Kulukundis, Piraeus and renamed Megalohari. Sold in 1950 to J. Theodorakopoulos, Athens. Operated under the management of Transworld Maritime Transport Corp. Sold in 1957 to Michalinos Maritime & Commercial, Piraeus and renamed Calliopi Michalos. Sold in 1962 to N. Michalos & Sons, Chios. Operated under the management of Victoria Steamship Co. She struck the quay at Lobito, Angola in June 1971, damaging her plating. The damage was aggravated by weather on 19 June. She developed a leak in the Atlantic Ocean (28°30′S 15°12′E) and was escorted in to Cape Town, South Africa, where temporary repairs were made. She was scrapped at Valencia, Spain in December 1971.

== George Gershwin ==
George Gershwin was built by California Shipbuilding Corporation. Her keel was laid on 29 March 1943. She was launched on 22 April and delivered on 4 May. Laid up at Mobile post-war, she was scuttled off Horn Island, Mississippi on 4 December 1975.

== George Gipp ==
George Gipp was built by Permanente Metals Corporation. Her keel was laid on 21 April 1943. She was launched on 16 May and delivered on 28 May. Laid up at Mobile post-war, she was scrapped at Mobile in July 1971.

== George G. Meade ==
George G. Meade was a limited troop carrier built by California Shipbuilding Corporation. Her keel was laid on 17 August 1942. She was launched on 25 September and delivered on 13 October. Built for the WSA, she was operated under the management of Weyerhauser Steamship Co. Torpedoed and damaged in the Atlantic Ocean 200 nautical miles (370 km) off Paramaribo, Dutch Guiana (7°11′N 52°30′W) by U-510 on 9 March 1943 whilst on a voyage from Bahia, Brazil to Paramaraibo. She was towed in to Paramaraibo, then towed to New York, where she was repaired. To the French Government in 1947 and renamed Rouen. Operated under the management of Compagnie Générale Transatlantique. Ran aground at Los Vilos, Chile on 12 May 1952. Refloated and towed to Valparaíso. Sold in 1953 to Bahia Salinas Compania Navigation, Panama and renamed Gannet. Reflagged to Liberia and operated under the management of Goulandris Bros. Reflagged to Greece in 1963. She was scrapped at Kaohsiung in May 1969.

== George Handley ==
George Handley was built by Southeastern Shipbuilding Corporation. Her keel was laid on 22 May 1942. She was launched on 7 December and delivered on 4 March 1943. She was scrapped at Kearny in December 1964.

== George Hawley ==
George Hawley was built by New England Shipbuilding Corporation. Her keel was laid on 6 April 1944. She was launched on 20 May and delivered on 31 May. Built for the WSA, she was operated under the management of Sprague Steamship Co. Torpedoed and damaged in the English Channel off The Lizard, United Kingdom by U-1199 on 22 January 1945 whilst on a voyage from Cherbourg, France to the Mumbles, United Kingdom. She was towed in to Plymouth and beached. She was scuttled at sea in October 1946 with a cargo of obsolete chemical ammunition.

== George H. Dern ==
George H. Dern was a limited troop carrier built by Permanente Metals Corporation. Her keel was laid on 16 November 1942. She was launched on 19 December and delivered on 28 December. Built for the WSA, she was operated under the management of Seas Shipping Co. To the French Government in 1946, operated under the management of Chargeurs Réunis. Renamed Calais in 1947. Sold in 1960 to Almavita Compania Navigation, Panama and renamed Almavita. Reflagged to Greece and operated under the management of Victoria Steamship Co. She was scrapped at Kaohsiung in May 1969.

== George H. Flanders ==
George H. Flanders was built by Oregon Shipbuilding Corporation. Her keel was laid on 15 March 1943. She was launched on 3 April and delivered at 11 April. Built for the WSA, she was operated under the management of W. R. Chamberlain & Co. To the Dutch Government in 1947 and renamed Boerhaave. Renamed Alamak that year and placed under the management of Van Nievelt, Goudriaan & Co., Rotterdam. Sold to her managers in 1949. Sold in 1958 to Tito Campanella, Genoa and renamed Gerolamo Campanella. Sold to the Polish Government in 1961 and renamed Huta Ferrum. Operated under the management of Polska Żegluga Morska. Sold to her managers in 1972. She was scrapped at Split, Yugoslavia in November 1972.

== George H. Himes ==
George H. Himes was built by Oregon Shipbuilding Corporation. Her keel was laid on 26 June 1943. She was launched on 16 July and delivered on 24 July. Built for the WSA, she was operated under the management of Shepard Steamship Co. Torpedoed and damaged by Japanese aircraft off Guadalcanal, Solomon Islands on 11 October 1943. She was beached at Koli Point. Subsequently refloated and repaired. Sold in 1947 to T. N. Epiphaniades Steamship Co., Piraeus and renamed Georgios Panoras. Operated under the management of Nomikos London Ltd. Management transferred to Furness, Withy & Co. in 1948, then T. P. Rose Richards Ltd. in 1950. Renamed Nicolaos Epiphaniades in 1956. Exploded and caught fire at Odessa, Soviet Union on 15 March 1961. Refloated in October and detained by Soviet authorities. Reported scrapped in September 1964.

== George H. Pendleton ==
George H. Pendleton was built by Bethlehem Fairfield Shipyard. Her keel was laid on 6 June 1943. She was launched on 10 July and delivered on 19 July. Laid up at Mobile post-war, she was scrapped at Panama City, Florida in November 1970.

== George H. Powell ==
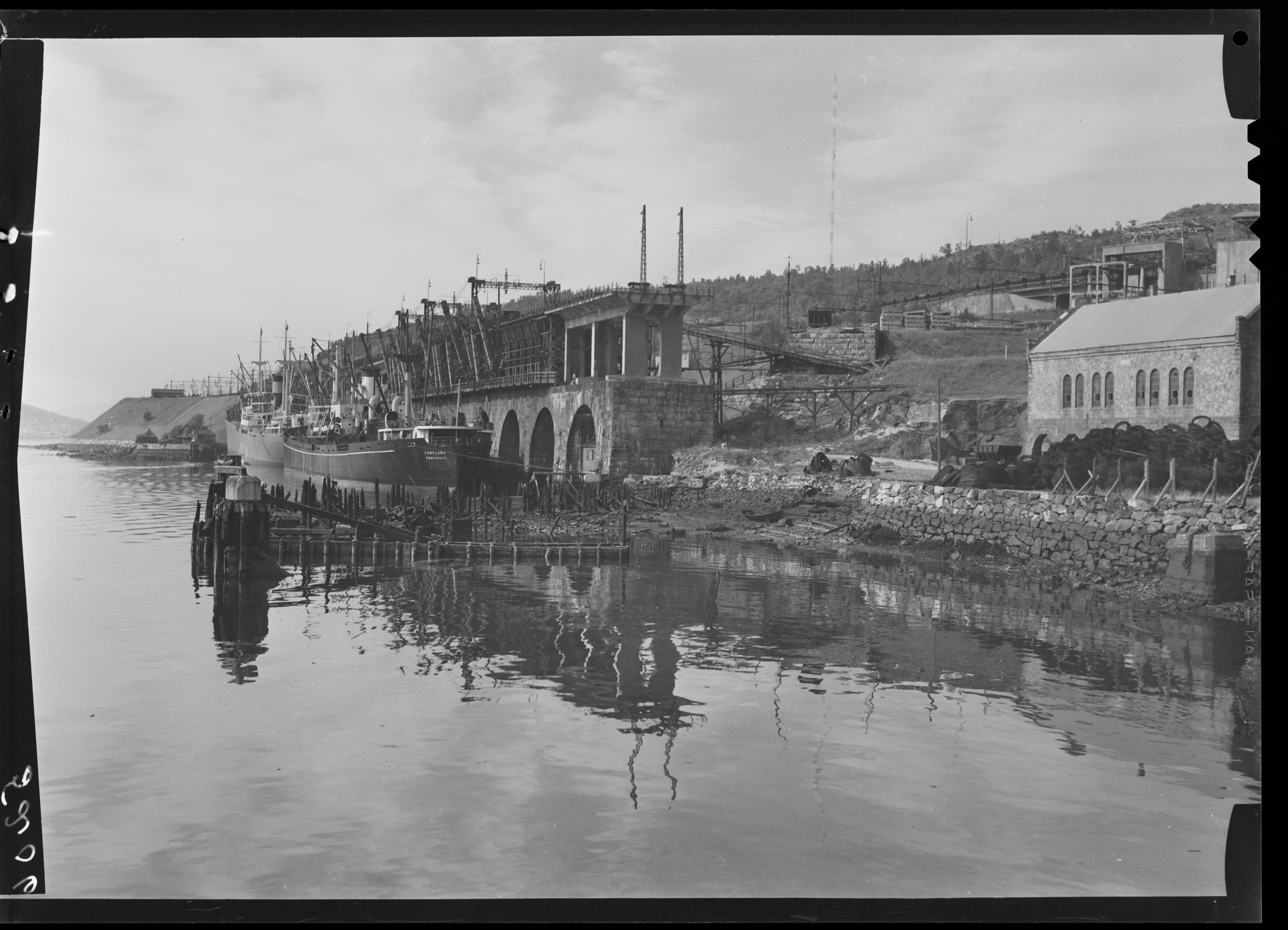
Grønland

George H. Powell was built by Permanente Metals Corporation. Her keel was laid on 16 November 1943. She was launched on 4 December and delivered on 16 December. Built for the WSA, she was operated under the management of Pope & Talbot Inc. Sold in 1946 to Det Danske Franske D/S A/S and renamed Grønland. Operated under the management of F. Hahn Petersen. Sold in 1951 to Compania de Comercia y Vapores, Panama and renamed Barka. Reflagged to Liberia and operated under the management of D. J. Negropontis. Sold in 1957 to Compania Oceanica de Navigation, Panama, remaining under the same flag and management. Sold in 1958 to Siracusana SpA di Transporti, Genoa and renamed Siracusano. She was scrapped at Vado Ligure in September 1962.

== George H. Thomas ==
George H. Thomas a limited troop carrier built by Oregon Shipbuilding Corporation. Her keel was laid on 7 August 1942. She was launched on 9 September and delivered on 21 September. Built for the WSA, she was operated under the management of Grace Line Inc. Sold in 1947 to Constantine Konialidis, Montevideo, Uruguay and renamed Aristarchos. Sold in 1948 to Society Armamente Aristomenis, Panama and renamed Resolute. Reflagged to Honduras. Sold in 1949 to Compania Maritima La Empresa, Puerto Cortes, Honduras. Operated under the management of Embiricos Ltd. Reflagged to Panama in 1950. Sold in 1955 to Hartland Steamship & Trading Co., Panama and renamed Cape Palmas. Reflagged to Liberia and operated under the management of Tharros Shipping Co. Management transferred to Pegasus Ocean Services in 1964, then to Carras Maritime Corp. in 1965. Sprang a leak in the Atlantic Ocean in July 1967 whilst on a voyage from Tampa to Bombay, India. She was beached at Tarrafal, Cape Verde on 15 July. Refloated on 25 August and towed to Saint Vincent. Arrested for debts owed in September. Reported sinking in April 1968. She was looted and set afire between May 1968 and November 1969. Sold that month to Lisbon buyers who hoped to refloat her, but she was reported still sunk in 1970.

== George H. Williams ==
George H. Williams was built by Oregon Shipbuilding Corporation. Her keel was laid on 7 May 1942. She was launched on 18 June and delivered on 30 June. She was scrapped at Philadelphia in August 1960.

== George Inness ==
George Inness was built by Permanente Metals Corporation. Her keel was laid on 6 July 1943. She was launched as George Inness on 28 July and delivered as Sambre on 9 August. To the United Kingdom under Lend-Lease. Built for the Ministry of War Transport (MoWT), she was operated under the management of Cunard White Star Line Ltd. Returned to USMC in 1947 and renamed George Inness. Laid up in the James River. She was scrapped at Baltimore in April 1961.

== George K. Fitch ==
George K. Fitch was built by Permanente Metals Corporation. Her keel was laid on 3 October 1943. She was launched on 22 October and delivered on 30 October. Built for the WSA, she was operated under the management of American-Hawaiian Steamship Company. Sold in 1947 to Waterman Steamship Corporation, Mobile and renamed Governor Bibb. Sold in 1948 to North Eastern Steamship Corp. and renamed North Sky. Operated under the management of Orion Shipping & Trading Corp. Sold in 1954 to Nordestal Society Armamente, Panama and renamed Agia Thalassina. Reflagged to Liberia, remaining under the same management. Sold in 1955 to Avila Compania Navigation, Panama. Remaining under the Liberian flag and operated under the management of World Seas Shipping Co. She arrived at Montevideo with severe damage on 29 September 1965, having run aground whilst on a voyage from Necochea, Argentina to Civitavecchia, Italy. She was laid up unrepaired. Sold in 1966 to Providencia de Navigacão, Montevideo and renamed Maria Teresa. She was towed to Santander, Spain for scrapping in September 1968.

== George Kenny ==
George Kenny was built by California Shipbuilding Corporation. Her keel was laid on 18 July 1943. She was launched on 9 August and delivered on 22 August. She was scrapped at Baltimore in July 1960.

== George L. Baker ==
George L. Baker was built by Oregon Shipbuilding Corporation. Her keel was laid on 5 March 1943. She was launched on 26 March and delivered on 2 April. Built for the WSA, she was operated under the management of Weyerhauser Steamship Co. To the Dutch Government in 1947 and renamed Kamerlingh Onnes. Operated under the management of Koninklijke Rotterdamsche Lloyd, Rotterdam. Sold to her managers in 1950 and renamed Tomini. Operated under the management of Willem Ruys & Zonen. Sold in 1957 to NV Scheepvaart Maatschappij Triton and renamed Triton, remaining under the same management. Sold in 1962 to Bacong Shipping Co. and renamed Southern Cross. Reflagged to Panama and operated under the management of Southern Industrial Projects. Sold in 1964 to Panama Merchants Steamship and renamed Mindanao Merchant. Operated under the management of Philippine Merchants Steamship Co. Sold in 1965 to South Pacific Coast Shipping Co. and renamed Brothers. Operated under the management of Kenneth Lewis. Management transferred to Lasco Shipping Co. in 1966. She was scrapped at Pusan in July 1969.

== George L. Curry ==
George L. Curry was built by Oregon Shipbuilding Corporation. Her keel was laid on 5 July 1943. She was launched on 26 July and delivered on 2 August. Built for the WSA, she was operated under the management of R. A. Nicol & Co. Sold in December 1946 to Waages Tankrederi II A/S, Oslo and renamed Runa. Operated under the management of Hagb. Waage. Sold in September 1953 to Compania Armadora Pegasus S.A., Monrovia, Liberia and renamed Pegasus. Operated under the management of Goulandris Bros. Reflagged to Costa Rica in 1955, then Greece in 1959. Sold in 1964 to Eastward Shipping Corp., Monrovia and renamed Eastward. Operated under the management of East Sun Textile Co. Sold in 1965 to United Forward Marine Corp., Monrovia and renamed United Forward. Operated under the management of United Forward Development Corp. Arrived at Kaohsiung for scrapping on 26 March 1968. Scrapping commenced on 1 June.

== George Leonard ==
George Leonard was built by Delta Shipbuilding Company. Her keel was laid on 31 May 1942. She was launched on 20 August and delivered on 19 September. She was scrapped at New Orleans in February 1964.

== George L. Farley ==
George L. Farley was built by New England Shipbuilding Corporation. Her keel was laid on 22 May 1944. She was launched on 12 July and delivered on 20 July. Laid up at Beaumont post-war, she was scuttled off South Padre Island, Texas on 8 October 1975.

== George L. Shoup ==
George L. Shoup was built by Oregon Shipbuilding Corporation. Her keel was laid on 9 April 1943. She was launched as George L. Shoup on 28 April and delivered as Pskov on 6 May. Transferred to the Soviet Union. She was scrapped at Faslane, United Kingdom in September 1970.

== George Luks ==
George Luks was built by Permanente Metals Corporation. Her keel was laid on 11 December 1943. She was launched on 31 December and delivered on 8 January 1944. She was scrapped at Kobe in May 1961.

== George Matthews ==
George Matthews was built by California Shipbuilding Corporation. Her keel was laid on 28 February 1942. She was launched on 9 May and delivered on 11 June. She was scrapped at Oakland in July 1967.

== George M. Bibb ==
George M. Bibb was built by Oregon Shipbuilding Corporation. Her keel was laid on 2 January 1943. She was launched on 31 January and delivered on 8 February. She was scrapped at Panama City, Florida in November 1962.

== George M. Cohan ==
George M. Cohan was built by Bethlehem Fairfield Shipyard. Her keel was laid on 2 June 1943. She was launched on 4 July and delivered on 14 July. Built for the WSA, she was operated under the management of Shepard Steamship Co. Sold in 1949 to Palmer Shipping Corp., Wilmington, North Carolina and renamed Harry T. Sold in 1952 to National Waterways Corporation and renamed General Patton. Operated under the management of National Shipping & Trading Corp. Sold in 1954 to Almargro Compania Navigation, Panama and renamed National Fighter. Reflagged to Liberia, remaining under the same management. Lengthened at Kobe in 1955, now 511 feet 6 inches (155.91 m) long and 8,537 GRT. Sold in 1961 to Hellenic Shipping & Industries Co., Piraeus and renamed Mesologi. Reflagged to Liberia in 1963. Sold in 1968 to Sareha Shipping Lines and renamed Blue Sand. Remained under the Liberian flag and operated under the management of Milos Santos. She was scrapped at Sakaide, Japan in November 1969.

== George Middlemas ==
George Middlemas was built by Permanente Metals Corporation. Her keel was laid on 22 February 1944. She was launched on 11 March and delivered on 20 March. She was scrapped at Philadelphia in 1960.

== George M. Pullman ==
George M. Pullman was built by Permanente Metals Corporation. Her keel was laid on 14 March 1943. She was launched on 11 April and delivered on 26 April. Built for the WSA, she was operated under the management of American President Lines. Sold in April 1946 to Skibs A/S Avanti, Oslo and renamed Silvana. Operated under the management of Tschudi & Eitzen. Sold in 1955 to Zephyr Compania Navigation, Puerto Limon and renamed Zephyr. Operated under the management of C. M. Lemos & Co. Sold in 1959 to Dido Compania Navigation SA, Piraeus and renamed Seiros. She was scrapped at Chiba, Japan in December 1963, or in the first quarter of 1964.

== George M. Shriver ==
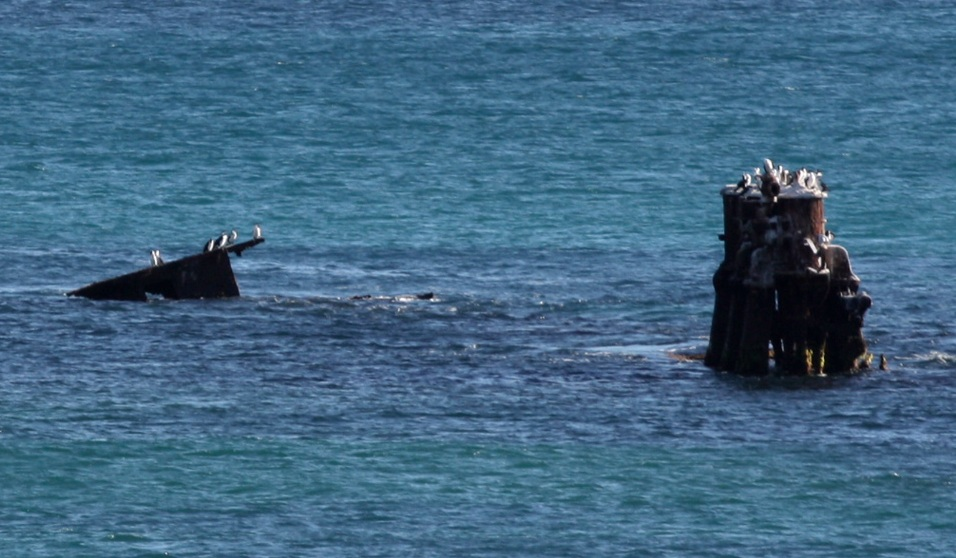
The wreck of Alkimos, September 2012.

George M. Shriver was built by Bethlehem Fairfield Shipyard. Her keel was laid on 18 September 1943. She was launched as George M. Shriver on 11 October and delivered as Viggo Hansteen on 18 October. To Norway under Lend-Lease. Sold in January 1947 to S. Ugelstad Rederi, Oslo. Operated under the management of S. Ugelstad. Sold in 1948 to A/S Asplund, Moss, Norway. Operated under the management of Rønneburg & Galtung. Sold in 1953 to Alkimos Shipping Co. S.A., Puerto Limon and renamed Alkimos. Operated under the management of Faros Shipping Co. Reflagged to Greece in 1959. Ran aground 170 nautical miles (310 km) north of Fremantle, Australia on 20 March 1963 and was severely damaged. She was refloated on 25 March and towed in to Fremantle. Departed for Hong Kong under tow on 30 May. The towline broke the next day and she ran aground (at 31°38′S 115°41′E). She was refloated on 11 February 1964. She was driven ashore on 2 May but was refloated. She was driven ashore again on 1 July and declared a constructive total loss. Subsequently, sold to Fremantle shipbreakers and partly scrapped. Wreck still in situ as of September 2012.

== George M. Verity ==
George M. Verity was built by Bethlehem Fairfield Shipyard. Her keel was laid on 10 August 1944. She was launched on 12 September and delivered on 29 September. Built for the WSA, she was operated under the management of United States Lines. Sold in 1947 to Calmar Steamship Corp., New York and renamed Seamar. Sold in 1955 to Bethlehem Steel Corp. Operated under the management of Calmar Steamship Corp. Renamed Wilmar in 1965. Sold in 1967 to Pacific Shipbreaking Corp., Portland, Oregon. Sold in 1968 to Yabut Ocean Lines and renamed Yrene Yabut. Reflagged to the Philippines and operated under the management of A. H. Carroll. She was scrapped at Hong Kong in March 1969.

== George N. Drake ==
George N. Drake was built by New England Shipbuilding Corporation. Her keel was laid on 18 January 1945. She was launched as George N. Drake on 13 March, she was delivered as Carl Oftedal on 28 March. Built for the Norwegian Government, she was sold in 1946 to Det Bergenske D/S, Bergen, Norway. Renamed Brant County in 1947. She collided with the American tanker Southern Cross in Delaware Bay on 28 March 1950. Both ships were damaged. Sold in 1954 to Halvorsen Shipping Co., Bergen and renamed Matang. Sold in 1956 to Hedwigshutte Kohlen & Kokswerke, Hamburg, West Germany and renamed Hedwigshutte. Sold in 1960 to Morania Compania Navigation and renamed Saronis. Reflagged to Greece and operated under the management of A. Luisi Ltd. Management transferred to J. C. Carras & Sons in 1965. She was scrapped at Kaohsiung in January 1968.

== George N. Seger ==
George N. Seger was built by New England Shipbuilding Corporation. Her keel was laid on 17 June 1944. She was launched on 8 August and delivered on 19 August. She was scrapped at Portland, Oregon in November 1967.

== George P. Garrison ==
George P. Garrison was built by Todd Houston Shipbuilding Corporation. Her keel was laid on 31 May 1943. She was launched as George P. Garrison on 12 July and completed as Belgian Liberty on 27 July. To the Belgian Government under Lend-Lease. Returned to the United States Government in 1947. Renamed George P. Garrison and laid up in the Hudson River. To the United States Department of Commerce (USDoC) in 1951. Operated under the management of Prudential Steamship Corporation, New York. Laid up in the Hudson River in 1952. Scuttled off the Virginia Capes in 1975.

== George P. McKay ==
George P. McKay was built by Oregon Shipbuilding Corporation. Her keel was laid on 25 October 1943. She was launched on 13 November and delivered on 24 November. Built for the WSA, she was operated under the management of Alaska Steamship Co. To the Dutch Government in 1947 and renamed Hemony. Renamed Leopoldskerk later that year and operated under the management of Vereenigde Nederlandsche Scheepaarts Maatschappij, Den Haag. Sold to her managers in 1950. Sold in 1962 to Concordia Shipping Corp and renamed Atticos. Reflagged to Lebanon and operated under the management of Transmarine Shipping Agencies. She was scrapped at Shanghai in May 1969.

== George Poindexter ==
George Poindexter was built by Delta Shipbuilding Company. Her keel was laid on 17 April 1943. She was launched on 18 May and delivered on 30 May. She was scrapped at Tacoma in May 1967.

== George Pomutz ==
George Pomutz was built by Delta Shipbuilding Company. Her keel was laid on 23 June 1944. She was launched on 3 August and delivered on 15 September. Laid up in the James River post-war, she was scrapped at Barcelona in July 1970.

== George Popham ==
George Popham was built by New England Shipbuilding Corporation. Her keel was laid on 1 September 1943. She was launched on 21 October and delivered on 8 November. She was scrapped at Philadelphia in 1967.

== George Read ==
George Read was built by Permanente Metals Corporation. Her keel was laid on 7 June 1942. She was launched on 30 July and delivered on 19 August. Laid up in the James River post-war, she was scrapped at Kearny in August 1971.

== George R. Holmes ==
George R. Holmes was built by Bethlehem Fairfield Shipyard. Her keel was laid on 5 June 1944. She was launched on 11 July and delivered on 24 July. Built for the WSA, she was operated under the management of Sprague Steamship Co. Management transferred to American Mail Line in 1946. Laid up at Beaumont in 1948. Sold to Arrow Steamship Co., New York in 1951 and renamed Jules Fribourg. Sold in 1956 to Bethlehem Steel Corp. and renamed Kenmar. Operated under the management of Calmar Steamship Corp. Sold in November 1967 to Pacific Shipwrecking Co., Portland, Oregon. Sold in March 1968 to Yabut Ocean Lines and renamed Corinne S. Yabut. Reflagged to the Philippines and operated under the management of A. H. Carroll. She was scrapped at Kaohsiung in September 1969.

== George Rogers Clark ==
George Rogers Clark was built by Permanente Metals Corporation. Her keel was laid on 20 November 1942. She was launched on 2 January 1943 and delivered on 13 January. Built for the WSA, she was operated under the management of De La Rama Steamship Company, Inc. To the French Government in 1947 and renamed Orleans. Operated under the management of Compagnie Marsellaise de Navigation Coloniale. Management transferred to Louis Dreyfus et Compagnie in 1948. Sold in 1960 to Société Navigation Caennaise, Anet. G. Lamy et Compagnie, Caen. She was scrapped at Hamburg in September 1963.

== George Ross ==
George Ross was built by Permanente Metals Corporation. Her keel was laid on 30 March 1942. She was launched on 29 June and delivered on 14 July. She was scrapped at Portland, Oregon in November 1966.

== George R. Poole ==
George R. Poole was built by J. A. Jones Construction Company, Brunswick. Her keel was laid on 7 December 1944. She was launched on 8 January 1945 and delivered on 19 January. Built for the WSA, she was operated under the management of Sprague Steamship Co. She was scrapped at Baltimore in March 1968.

== George S. Boutwell ==
George S. Boutwell was built by Permanente Metals Corporation. Her keel was laid on 30 November 1942. She was launched on 31 December and delivered on 11 January 1943. Built for the WSA, she was operated under the management of Alaska Packers Association. Sold in 1947 to Sedden & Christenson, San Francisco. Sold in 1949 to Seven Seas Steamship Corp. Operated under the management of Blidberg Rothchild Company. Management transferred to Orion Shipping & Trading Co. in 1952. Renamed Seaglider in 1953. Sold in 1955 to Ships & Freighters Inc. and renamed Rayvah. Operated under the management of T. & J. Stevenson & Co. Reflagged to Liberia in 1957. Management transferred to Ocean Cargoes Inc. in 1960. Sold in 1961 to Bleakley Transportation Co., New York and renamed Cara Sea. Sold in 1962 to Conestoga Carriers Corp. and renamed Diana B. Operated under the management of G. T. Bates & Co. Returned to USDoC in 1963, then sold to Zidelli Explorations Inc. She was scrapped at Portland, Oregon in April 1964.

== George Sharswood ==
George Sharswood was built by Bethlehem Fairfield Shipyard. Her keel was laid on 11 January 1943. She was launched on 19 February and delivered on 6 March. Built for the WSA, she was operated under the management of Dichmann, Wright & Pugh. Sold in 1947 to East Harbor Trading Corp., New York and renamed New Rochelle Trails. Sold in 1950 to Merchants Steamship Corp. and renamed North Light. Operated under the management of Orion Shipping & Trading Co. Sold in 1953 to Delphi Steamship Co., remaining under the same management. Sold in 1955 to Columbia Steamship Co. and renamed Willamette Trader. Sold in 1956 to Standard Steamship Corp. Operated under the management of West Coast Steamship Co., Portland, Oregon. Sold to her managers in 1958. Returned to USDoC in 1961, the sold to Zidelli Explorations Inc. She was scrapped at Tacoma in 1962.

== George Shiras ==
George Shiras was a limited troop carrier built by Bethlehem Fairfield Shipyard. Her keel was laid on 22 December 1942. She was launched on 5 February 1943 and delivered on 15 February. Built for the WSA, she was operated under the management of Prudential Steamship Corporation. Sold in 1946 to Atlantic Maritime Co., Panama and renamed Atlantic Breeze. Operated under the management of Boyd, Weir & Sewell. Management transferred to S. Livanos & Co. in 1948, then Maritime Brokers Inc. in 1952. Sold in 1962 to Prekookeanska Plovidba, Bar, Yugoslavia and renamed Cetinje. Operated under the management of Anglo-Yugoslavia Shipping Co. She was scrapped at Split in March 1968.

== George Steers ==
George Steers was built by Todd Houston Shipbuilding Corporation. Her keel was laid on 22 January 1944. She was launched on 4 March and delivered on 17 March. She was scrapped at Baltimore c. 1961.

== George Sterling ==
George Sterling was built by Permanente Metals Corporation. Her keel was laid on 30 August 1943. She was launched on 19 September and delivered on 27 September. She was scrapped at Portland, Oregon in June 1958.

== George S. Wasson ==
George S. Wasson was built by New England Shipbuilding Corporation. Her keel was laid on 22 October 1943. She was launched on 7 December and delivered on 23 December. Built for the WSA, she was operated under the management of R. A. Nicol & Co. She was damaged by a mine 5 nautical miles (9.3 km) off The Smalls on 31 January 1944 whilst on a voyage from Portland, Maine to Avonmouth, United Kingdom. She put in to Milford Haven, United Kingdom. Scuttled as a blockship as part of Gooseberry 1, off Verreville, France on 8 June 1944. Foundered during storms between 19 and 22 June. Abandoned at a total loss on 16 July.

== George T. Angell ==
George T. Angell was built by New England Shipbuilding Corporation. Her keel was laid on 22 November 1943. She was launched on 8 January 1944 and delivered on 19 January. Built for the WSA, she was operated under the management of American Export Lines. Sold in 1946 to Tirrana S.A. di Navigazione, Naples, Italy and renamed Firenze. Sold in 1953 to Società Anonima Importazione Carboni e Navigazione, Savona, Italy. Sold in 1956 to Lauro & Montella, Naples and renamed Sileno. Sold in 1960 to Achille Lauro, Naples and renamed Iris. She was scrapped at La Spezia in April 1969.

== George Taylor ==
George Taylor was built by Permanente Metals Corporation. Her keel was laid on 27 April 1942. She was launched on 9 July and delivered on 28 July. She was scrapped at Alameda, California in August 1961.

== George Thacher ==
George Thacher was built by California Shipbuilding Corporation. Her keel was laid on 5 May 1942. She was launched on 23 June and delivered on 16 July. Built for the WSA, she was operated under the management of Moore-McCormack Lines. Torpedoed and sunk in the Atlantic Ocean off the coast of French Equatorial Africa (1°50′S 8°00′E) by U-126 on 1 November 1942 whilst on a voyage from Charleston, South Carolina to Mombasa, Kenya.

== George Uhler ==
George Uhler was built by Bethlehem Fairfield Shipyard. Her keel was laid on 21 August 1943. She was launched on 16 September and delivered on 24 September. Built for the WSA, she was operated under the management of Isthmian Steamship Corp. Management transferred to Prudential Steamship Corporation in 1946. Sold to her managers in 1947. Sold in 1952 to United States Navigation Co. Sold later that year to Philadelphia & Norfolk Steamship Co., Wilmington, Delaware and renamed Southern Trader. Sold in 1954 to National Shipping & Trading Corp., New York and renamed National Trader. Sold later that year to Ortegal Compania Navigation, Panama. Reflagged to Liberia and operated under the management of her previous owner. Lengthened at Maizuru, Japan in 1955. Now 511 feet 6 inches (155.91 m) long and 8,490 GRT. Caught fire in the Yucatan Channel off Cape San Antonio, Cuba (22°20′N 85°22′W) and abandoned by her crew on 16 December 1960 whilst on a voyage from Vitoria to Mobile. She was towed in to Mobile on 23 December. Declared a constructive total loss, she was scrapped in Japan in 1961.

== George Vancouver ==
George Vancouver was built by Kaiser Company, Vancouver, Washington. Her keel was laid on 15 April 1942. She was launched on 4 July and delivered on 22 July. Laid up a Beaumont post-war. She sank off the coast of Texas on 29 October 1976 whilst being towed to a scuttling site off Freeport, Texas.

== George Vickers ==
George Vickers was built by Bethlehem Fairfield Shipyard. Her keel was laid on 19 June 1943. She was launched on 22 July and delivered on 30 July. She was scrapped at Baltimore in 1960.

== George Von L. Meyer ==
George Von L. Meyer was built by Permanente Metals Corporation. Her keel was laid on 4 September 1942. She was launched on 23 September and delivered on 2 October. She was scrapped at Portland, Oregon in December 1959.

== George W. Alther ==
George W. Alther was built by Delta Shipbuilding Company. Her keel was laid on 14 April 1944. She was launched on 22 May and delivered on 22 July. Built for the WSA, she was transferred to the USDoC in 1946. Sold in 1951 to Paroh Steamship Corporation, Wilmington and renamed Annioc. Renamed Venetia in 1956. Sold in 1957 to Sirius Compania Maritima y Comercial S. A., Monrovia. Sold in 1959 to Eastern Star Maritima S.A., Monrovia and renamed Auromar. Sold in 1964 to Cosmos Marine Development Corp., Monrovia and renamed Cosmos Campella. She was scrapped at Kaohsiung in June 1968.

== George Walton ==
George Walton was built by Southeastern Shipbuilding Corporation. Her keel was laid on 18 June 1942. She was launched on 21 January 1943 and delivered on 30 March. She caught fire 350 nautical miles (650 km) west of Cape Flattery, Washington on 6 November 1951 whilst on a voyage from Portland, Oregon to Bombay and was abandoned by her crew. She was taken in tow, but sank 40 nautical miles (74 km) north west of Cape Flattery on 18 November.

== George Washington Carver ==
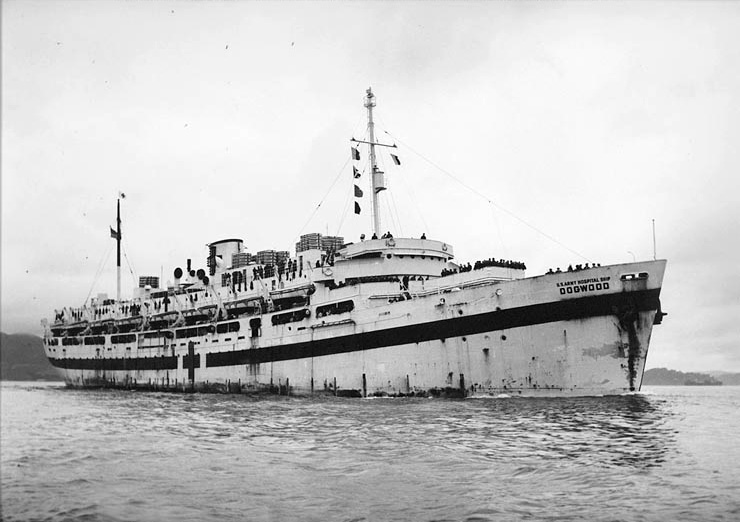
USAHS Dogwood

George Washington Carver was built by Permanente Metals Corporation. Her keel was laid on 12 April 1943. She was launched on 7 May and delivered on 24 May. To the United States Army in November 1943. Renamed Dogwood and converted to a hospital ship. Converted to a troopship at San Francisco in January 1946 and renamed George Washington Carver. Returned to the United States Government later that year. She was scrapped at Oakland in January 1964.

== George W. Cable ==
George W. Cable was built by Delta Shipbuilding Company. Her keel was laid on 27 September 1944. She was launched as George W. Cable on 6 November and delivered to the United States Navy as Hecuba on 30 November. Converted for naval use by Todd-Johnson Dry Dock Co., New Orleans. Placed in reserve at Pearl Harbor in June 1946. Returned to USMC in June 1947 and renamed George W. Cable. Towed to San Francisco and laid up in Suisun Bay. She was scrapped at Portland, Oregon in 1965.

== George W. Campbell ==
George W. Campell was a limited troop carrier built by Oregon Shipbuilding Corporation. Her keel was laid on 22 December 1942. She was launched on 15 January 1943 and delivered on 22 January. Built for the WSA, she was operated under the management of Weyerhauser Steamship Co. To the French Government in 1946. Operated under the management of Compagnie Générale Transatlantique. Renamed St. Valery en Caux in 1947. Management transferred to Compagnie des Messageries Maritimes in 1948. Renamed St. Valery in 1949, reverting to St. Valery en Caux in 1956. Management transferred to Fraimer Transports Petroliers in 1961. Sold in 1962 to Naviera y Financiera Ltda. and renamed Henriette. Reflagged to Lebanon and operated under the management of Dabinovic SA. She was scrapped at Hong Kong in August 1967.

== George W. Childs ==
George W. Childs was built by Bethlehem Fairfield Shipyard. Her keel was laid on 9 June 1943. She was launched on 16 July and delivered on 26 July. Built for the WSA, she was operated under the management of Dichmann, Wright & Pugh. In January 1944, she was damaged when her cargo shifted whilst on a voyage from New York to the United Kingdom. She put in to Loch Ewe on 1 February and ran aground there. She was refloated on 27 February and towed to Greenock. Scuttled as a blockship as part of Gooseberry 2, off Saint-Laurent, France on 8 June 1944. Foundered during storms between 19 and 22 June. Abandoned at a total los son 16 July.

== George Weems ==
George Weems was built by Bethlehem Fairfield Shipyard. Her keel was laid on 19 August 1942. She was launched on 26 September and delivered on 7 October. Built for the WSA, she was operated under the management of Moore-McCormack Lines. She ran aground on the East Finngrund Bank, off Gävle, Sweden on 10 January 1948 whilst on a voyage from Hudiksvall, Sweden to Baltimore. She was refloated on 12 January and towed in to Stockholm, where she was declared a constructive total loss, and laid up. Sold in October 1948 to Skibs A/S Mirva, Oslo for $175,000. Placed under the management of Simonsen & Astrup. Temporary repairs were made at Finnboda Varv, Stockholm. She was towed to Hamburg in December for repairs by Deutsche Werft. Transferred in March 1949 to Skibs A/S Mirva & A/S Fidelio, Oslo and renamed Myken. Transferred in 1950 to Skibs A/S Mesna & A/S Fidelio, Oslo. Sold in June 1951 to Halieta Compania Naviera SA, Panama and renamed Cavolidi. Operated under the management of Orion Shipping & Trading Co. Sold in 1953 to Compania Maritima Italo-Panamense, Panama & Genoa and renamed Cocle. Reflagged to Panama. Sold later that year to Farwest Maritime Trading Corp., Panama. Operated under the management of her previous owner. Sold in 1959 to White Eagle Maritime Co. Ltd., Panama and renamed White Eagle. Operated under the management of Maritime Brokers Inc. Sold in 1963 to United White Shipping Co. Ltd., Panama. Transferred in 1964 to United White Shipping Co. Ltd., Piraeus. Operated under the management of S. Livanos. She ran aground on the south point of San Clemente Island, California (32°55′N 118°33′W) on 10 November 1966 whilst on a voyage from a Japanese port to San Diego. Abandoned as a constructive total loss.

== George Westinghouse ==
George Westinghouse was built by Permanente Metals Corporation. Her keel was laid on 8 September 1942. She was launched on 20 October and delivered on 31 October. She was scrapped at Panama City, Florida in September 1961.

== George Whitefield ==
George Whitefield was built by Southeastern Shipbuilding Corporation. Her keel was laid on 22 May 1943. She was launched on 6 August and delivered on 24 August. Built for the WSA, she was operated under the management of A. H. Bull & Co. Sold in August 1947 to Borges Rederi A/S, Tønsberg, Norway and renamed Wilford. Operated under the management of Hans Borge until 1956. Sold in 1957 to Polena Società di Navigazione, Genoa and renamed Orata. Sold in 1963 to Sovtorgflot, Odessa, Soviet Union and renamed Daryal. Port of registry changed to Ilyichyovsk in 1972. Withdrawn from shipping registers that year. Sold for scrapping in 1985.

== George W. Julian ==
George W. Julian was built by Oregon Shipbuilding Corporation. Her keel was laid on 25 April 1943. She was launched on 14 May and delivered on 22 May. She was scrapped at Tacoma in 1961.

== George W. Kendall ==
George W. Kendall was a tanker built by Delta Shipbuilding Company. Her keel was laid on 19 May 1943. She was launched 10 July and delivered on 13 September. Built for the WSA, she was operated under the management of American Republics Corp. Sold in 1948 to T. J. Stevenson & Co., New York and renamed Dorothy Stevenson. Rebuilt as a cargo ship at Mobile in 1949. Sold in 1954 to Cambridge Steamship Corp. and renamed Cambridge. Reflagged to Liberia and operated under the management of her previous owner. Sold in 1956 to Pulaski Transport Line and renamed Wolna Polska. Sold in 1957 to .Cambridge Steamship Corp. and renamed Cambridge. Operated under the management of T. J. Stevenson & Co. Management transferred to Ocean Freighting & Brokerage Corp. in 1959. Sold in 1961 to Yi Ming Navigation Corp., Taipei, Taiwan and renamed Yi Ming. Placed under the Chinese flag. Reflagged to Taiwan in 1965. She was scrapped at Kaohsiung in March 1968.

== George W. Lively ==
George W. Lively was built by Todd Houston Shipbuilding Corporation. Her keel was laid on 16 August 1943. She was launched on 4 October and delivered on 15 October. She was scrapped at Philadelphia in June 1966.

== George W. McCrary ==
George W. McCrary was built by Permanente Metals Corporation. Her keel was laid on 20 October 1942. She was launched on 28 November and delivered on 7 December. She was scrapped at Kearny in December 1967.

== George W. Norris ==
George W. Norris was built by J. A. Jones Construction Company, Brunswick. Her keel was laid on 31 October 1944. She was launched on 2 December and delivered on 12 December. Built for the WSA, she was operated under the management of Prudential Steamship Corp. She ran aground and was wrecked at Tanegashima, Japan on 6 March 1946.

== George W. Woodward ==
George W. Woodward was built by Bethlehem Fairfield Shipyard. Her keel was laid on 12 May 1943. She was launched on 9 June and delivered on 24 June. She was scrapped at Faslane in 1960.

== George Wythe ==
George Wythe was built by Bethlehem Fairfield Shipyard. Her keel was laid on 22 September 1941. She was launched on 22 March 1942 and delivered on 9 May. Laid up in the James River post-war, she was scrapped at Bilbao in December 1970.

== Geronimo ==
Geronimo was built by Permanente Metals Corporation. Her keel was laid on 5 May 1943. She was launched on 29 May and delivered on 9 June. She was scrapped at Tacoma in 1960.

== G. H. Corless ==
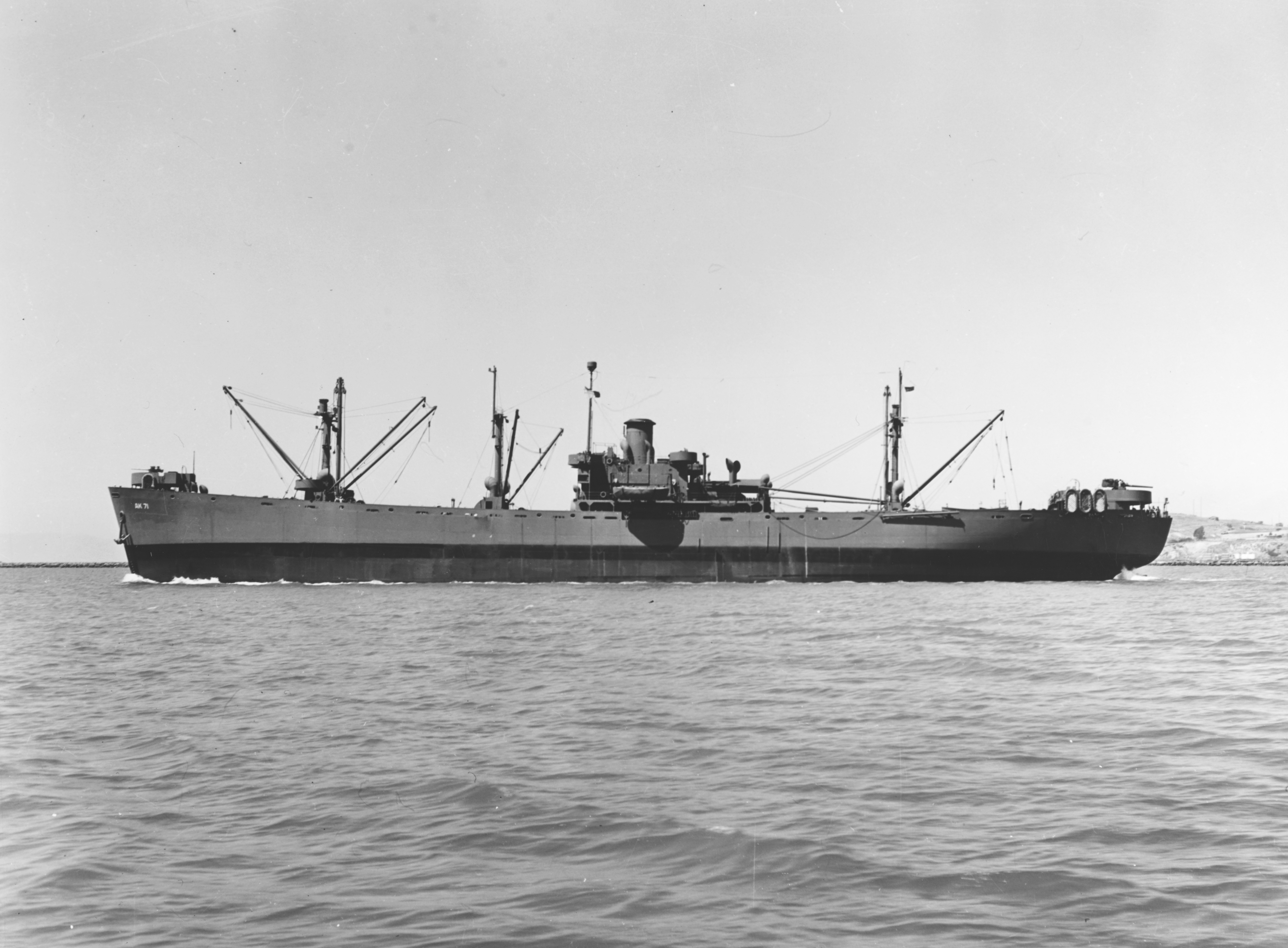
USS Adhara

G. H. Corless was built by Permanente Metals Corporation. Her keel was laid on 16 September 1942, she was launched as G. H. Corliss on 27 October and delivered on 6 November as Adhara for the United States Navy. Returned to WSA in December 1945 and renamed G. H. Corliss. Laid up in the James River post-war, she was scrapped at Gandia, Spain in March 1972.

== Gideon Welles ==
Gideon Welles was a limited troop carrier built by Oregon Shipbuilding Corporation. Her keel was laid on 19 July 1942. She was launched on 23 August and delivered on 7 September. Built for the WSA, she was operated under the management of Pope & Talbot Inc. Sold in 1946 to International Investment Corp., Panama. Renamed Pioneer in 1947 and placed under the management of Panama R. P. & Nicolini Hermanos. Sold in 1949 to Unione Società per Azione, Genoa and renamed Punta Plaia. Sold in 1950 to Società per Azione Emanuele V. Parodi, Genoa and renamed Isa Parodi. Sold in 1960 to Polska Żegluga Morska and renamed Kopalia Myslowice. Converted to a floating warehouse in 1966. She was scrapped at Gdańsk, Poland in December 1969.

== Gilbert M. Hitchcock ==
Gilbert M. Hitchcock was built by Permanente Metals Corporation. Her keel was laid on 3 April 1944. She was launched on 22 April and delivered on 30 April. She was scrapped at Portland, Oregon in February 1967.

== Gilbert Stuart ==
Gilbert Stuart was built by Oregon Shipbuilding Corporation. Her keel was laid on 31 March 1943. She was launched on 20 April and delivered on 27 April. Built for the WSA, she was operated under the management of American Mail Line. Sold in 1947 to Hellenic Lines Ltd., Piraeus & New York and renamed Hellenic Sky. Placed under the management of P. G. Callimanopulos in 1953. Laid up at Piraeus in 1971. She was sold to shipbreakers at Istanbul, Turkey in January 1973.

== Glamorgan Seam ==
Glamorgan Seam was a collier built by Delta Shipbuilding Company. Her keel was laid on 22 February 1945. She was launched on 18 April and delivered on 7 June. Built for the WSA, she was operated under the management of Sprague Steamship Co., Boston, Massachusetts. Sold to her managers in 1946. Renamed Plymouth in 1948. Sold in 1963 to Marine Navigation Co. and renamed Marine Merchant. Operated under the management of Marine Transport Lines. She was scrapped at Kaohsiung in July 1968.

== Glen Curtiss ==
Glen Curtiss was built by Permanente Metals Corporation. Her keel was laid on 21 March 1943. She was launched on 18 April and delivered on 30 April. Built for the WSA, she was operated under the management of United States Lines. Sold in 1947 to Società Anonyme di Navigazione Lussino, Trieste, Italy and renamed Absirto. Sold in 1959 to Plamar SA, Panama and renamed Albino. Operated under the management of Olympic Maritime SA. Sold in 1961 to Raymond & Maksoume, Beirut, Lebanon and renamed Malou. Sold in 1962 to Phoebus D. Kyprianou, Beirut. She was scrapped at Shanghai in November 1969.

== Gouverneur Morris ==
Gouverneur Morris was built by Oregon Shipbuilding Corporation. Her keel was laid on 29 March 1943. She was launched as Gouverneur Morris on 18 April and delivered as Leningrad on 26 April. Renamed Ivan Kulibin in 1962. Delivered to a shipyard in Vladivostok for scrapping in September 1974.

== Grace Abbott ==
Grace Abbott was built by Bethlehem Fairfield Shipyard. Her keel was laid on 29 August 1942. She was launched on 10 October and delivered on 17 October. She was scrapped at Portland, Oregon in September 1967.

== Grace R. Hebard ==
Grace R. Hebard was built by Oregon Shipbuilding Corporation. Her keel was laid on 17 November 1943. She was launched on 6 December and delivered on 21 December. She was scrapped at Philadelphia in May 1966.

== Graham Taylor ==
Graham Taylor was built by Oregon Shipbuilding Corporation. Her keel was laid on 27 February 1943. She was launched as Graham Taylor on 21 March and delivered to the Soviet Union as Mikhail Kutusov on 28 March. She was scrapped at Nakhodka, Soviet Union in January 1973.

== Grant P. Marsh ==
Grant P. Marsh was built by Oregon Shipbuilding Corporation. Her keel was laid on 1 December 1943. She was launched as Grant P. Marsh on 16 December and delivered as Valery Chkalov on 30 December. To the Soviet Union under Lend-Lease. Deleted from shipping registers c.1964.

== Grant Wood ==
Grant Wood was built by St. Johns River Shipbuilding Company. Her keel was laid on 6 August 1943. She was launched on 14 October and delivered on 26 October. Built for the WSA, she was operated under the management of American Export Lines. Sold in 1947 to Società M. Bottiglieri fu G. Torre, Genoa and renamed Orsolina. Sold in 1948 to Vincenzo Bottiglieri, Torre del Greco, Italy. Sold in 1949 to Michele Bottiglieri, Torre del Greco. Sold in 1951 to Giovanni Bottliglieri, Torre del Greco. She was scrapped at La Spezia in September 1970.

== Granville S. Hall ==
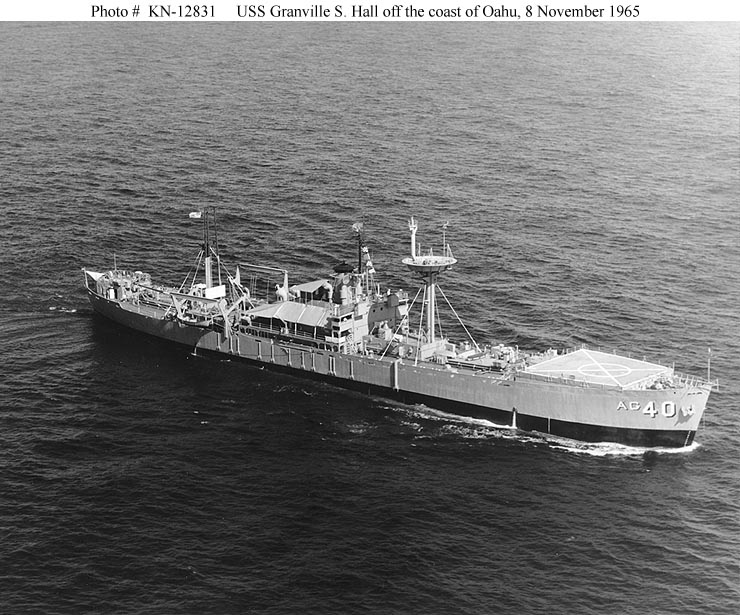
USS Granville S. Hall

Granville S. Hall was built by J. A. Jones Construction Company, Panama City. Her keel was laid on 16 September 1944. She was launched on 24 October and delivered on 7 November. Laid up in Suisun Bay in June 1952. To the United States Navy in June 1953. Converted to an experimental minesweeper at Mare Island Naval Shipyard, Vallejo, California. Took part in Operation Castle in March 1954. Placed in reserve at San Diego in 1957. Recommissioned in May 1962. Subsequently placed in reserve at Pearl Harbor. She was scrapped in Japan in May 1972.

== Granville Stuart ==
Granville Stuart was built by California Shipbuilding Corporation. Her keel was laid on 15 June 1943. She was launched as Granville Stuart on 11 July and delivered as Samaritan on 23 July. To the MoWT under Lend-Lease. Operated under the management of Cunard White Star Line Ltd. Sold to her managers in 1947 and renamed Vandalia. Sold in 1954 to Marine Transport Co., Panama and renamed Sideris. Operated under the management of Rethymnis & Kulukundis. Management transferred to Margaronis Navigation Agency in 1956. Sold in 1969 to Transmarine Carriers Corp. Reflagged to Liberia, remaining under the same management. She was scrapped at Barcelona in July 1971.

== Gratia ==
Gratia was built by Delta Shipbuilding Company. Her keel was laid on 14 September 1944. She was launched as John W. Draper on 21 October and delivered to the United States Navy as Gratia on 20 November. Placed in reserved at Pearl Harbor in July 1946. To USMC in July 1947. Renamed John W. Draper and laid up in Suisun Bay. Scrapped at Richmond in April 1965.

== Grenville M. Dodge ==
Grenville M. Dodge was built by Permanente Metals Corporation. Her keel was laid on 5 January 1943. She was launched on 9 February and delivered on 20 February. Laid up in the James River post-war, she was scrapped at Philadelphia in March 1974.

== Grover C. Hutcherson ==
Grover C. Hutcherson was built by St. Johns River Shipbuilding Company. Her keel was laid on 21 November 1944. She was launched on 22 December and delivered on 31 December. Laid up in the James River post-war, she was scrapped at Castellón de la Plana in December 1972.

== Gus W. Darnell ==
Gus W. Darnell was built by Todd Houston Shipbuilding Corporation. Her keel was laid on 14 April 1944. She was launched on 22 May and delivered on 31 May. Built for the WSA, she was operated under the management of J. H. Winchester & Co. Torpedoed and damaged by Japanese aircraft off Samar Island, Philippines on 23 November 1944 whilst on a voyage from an American port to Leyte, Philippines. She was beached, then later refloated. Declared a constructive total loss. Subsequently repaired in situ. To the United States Navy on 2 September 1945 and renamed Justin. Returned to WSA in January 1946 and renamed Gus W. Darnell. Laid up in Suisun Bay. She was scrapped at Terminal Island in June 1954.

== Gutzon Borglum ==
Gutzon Borglum was built by California Shipbuilding Corporation. Her keel was laid on 22 July 1943. She was launched on 14 August and delivered on 30 August. She was damaged in a typhoon in the Pacific Ocean in 1945 and ran aground. Refloated, but collided with a United States Navy tug. Declared a constructive total loss. Towed to the United States and laid up in the James River. She was transferred to the United States Navy in 1959 and was scuttled in 1959 or 1960.

== G. W. Goethals ==
G. W. Goethals was built by Oregon Shipbuilding Corporation. Her keel was laid on 27 October 1942. She was launched on 22 November and delivered on 2 December. Laid up in the James River post-war, she was scrapped at Castellón de la Plana in February 1973.
