= George Shiras Jr. =

US Supreme Court justice from 1892 to 1903

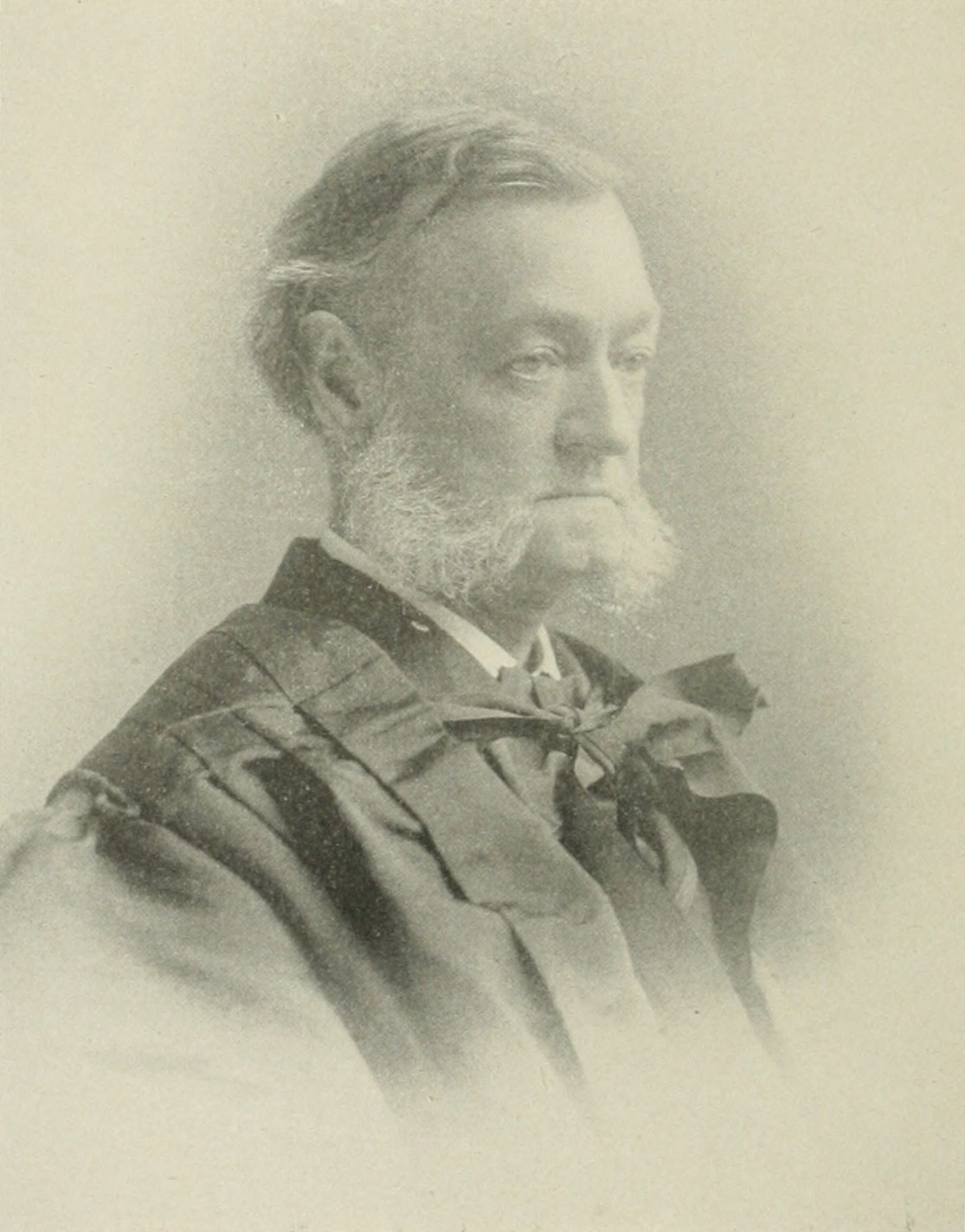
- Shiras c. 1899

Associate Justice of the Supreme Court of the United States
- In office October 10, 1892 – February 23, 1903
- Nominated by: Benjamin Harrison
- Preceded by: Joseph Bradley
- Succeeded by: William Day

Personal details
- Born: January 26, 1832 Pittsburgh, Pennsylvania, U.S.
- Died: August 2, 1924 (aged 92) Pittsburgh, Pennsylvania, U.S.
- Resting place: Allegheny Cemetery
- Party: Republican
- Spouse: Lillie Kennedy (m. 1857; died 1912)
- Children: 1
- Education: Yale University (BA)

George Shiras Jr. (January 26, 1832 – August 2, 1924) was an American lawyer who served as an associate justice of the Supreme Court of the United States from 1892 to 1903. At that time of his appointment, he had 37 years of private legal practice but had never judged a case. He is noted for his conservative voting with the majority in Pollock v. Farmers' Loan & Trust Co. and in Plessy v. Ferguson.

== Life and career ==
Shiras was born in Pittsburgh, Pennsylvania, January 26, 1832. He attended Ohio University and then graduated from Yale College, Phi Beta Kappa, in 1853. He began law school at Yale Law School, but left before earning a law degree. He finished his training by reading law at a law office, then practiced law in Dubuque, Iowa, from 1855 to 1858, and in Pittsburgh, Pennsylvania, from 1858 to 1892. In Pittsburgh, he became a prominent corporate attorney, and he was noted for his honesty and pragmatism while representing some of the nation's industrial giants.

On July 19, 1892, Shiras was nominated by President Benjamin Harrison as an associate justice, to succeed Joseph P. Bradley. He was recommended for the post by his third cousin, Secretary of State James G. Blaine. Shiras was confirmed by the United States Senate on July 26, 1892, and took the judicial oath of office on October 10, 1892.

Although Shiras sat on the Court for more than 10 years authoring 253 majority decisions and 14 dissents, he is noted for his votes on just two landmark cases, Pollock v. Farmers' Loan & Trust Co. (1895), and Plessy v. Ferguson (1896). He sided with the majority in the 5–4 decision in Pollock to strike down the Income Tax Act of 1894 as unconstitutional. Some historians believe Shiras was the pivotal Justice who switched his vote, while other historians suspect that it was either Justice Horace Gray or Justice David Brewer. Regardless, the ruling in Pollock led to the need for a constitutional amendment to impose a federal income tax, and in 1913, the Sixteenth Amendment to the United States Constitution was ratified. Shiras also voted with the 7–1 majority in Plessy v. Ferguson, which upheld the constitutionality of racial segregation under the doctrine of separate but equal, and which was effectively overruled in 1954.

Shiras retired from the Supreme Court on February 23, 1903. He died on August 2, 1924, in Pittsburgh, Pennsylvania as a result of a fall followed by pneumonia. He is buried in Allegheny Cemetery in Pittsburgh.

His son, George Shiras III, served as a member of the United States House of Representatives for Pennsylvania.

== Legacy ==
The World War II Liberty ship SS George Shiras was named in his honor.

== See also ==
- List of justices of the Supreme Court of the United States

== Notes ==
Legal offices
Preceded by Joseph Bradley	Associate Justice of the Supreme Court of the United States; 1892–1903	Succeeded by William Day
