= SS George Shiras =

Liberty ship of WWII

History

United States
- Name: George Shiras
- Namesake: George Shiras
- Owner: War Shipping Administration (WSA)
- Operator: Prudential Steamship Corporation
- Ordered: as type (EC2-S-C1) hull, MCE hull 939
- Awarded: 30 January 1942
- Builder: Bethlehem-Fairfield Shipyard, Baltimore, Maryland
- Cost: $1,073,496
- Yard number: 2089
- Way number: 14
- Laid down: 22 December 1942
- Launched: 5 February 1943
- Sponsored by: Mrs. Roberson Thompson
- Completed: 15 February 1943
- Identification: Call sign: KKAP
- Fate: Sold 8 November 1946

United States
- Owner: Atlantic Maritime Company, Inc.
- Renamed: Atlantic Breeze
- Fate: Scrapped 1968

General characteristics
- Class & type: Liberty ship; type EC2-S-C1, standard
- Tonnage: 10,865 LT DWT; 7,176 GRT
- Displacement: 3,380 long tons (3,434 t) (light); 14,245 long tons (14,474 t) (max)
- Length: 441 feet 6 inches (135 m) oa; 416 feet (127 m) pp; 427 feet (130 m) lwl
- Beam: 57 feet (17 m)
- Draft: 27 ft 9.25 in (8.4646 m)
- Installed power: 2 × Oil fired 450 °F (232 °C) boilers, operating at 220 psi (1,500 kPa); 2,500 hp (1,900 kW)
- Propulsion: 1 × triple-expansion steam engine, (manufactured by General Machinery Corp., Hamilton, Ohio); 1 × screw propeller
- Speed: 11.5 knots (21.3 km/h; 13.2 mph)
- Capacity: 562,608 cubic feet (15,931 m^{3}) (grain); 499,573 cubic feet (14,146 m^{3}) (bale)
- Complement: 38–62 USMM; 21–40 USNAG
- Armament: Varied by ship; Bow-mounted 3-inch (76 mm)/50-caliber gun; Stern-mounted 4-inch (102 mm)/50-caliber gun; 2–8 × single 20-millimeter (0.79 in) Oerlikon anti-aircraft (AA) cannons and/or, 2–8 × 37-millimeter (1.46 in) M1 AA guns

SS George Shiras was a Liberty ship built in the United States during World War II. She was named after George Shiras, an American lawyer who served as an Associate Justice of the Supreme Court of the United States, from 1892 to 1903.

== Construction ==
George Shiras was laid down on 22 December 1942, under a Maritime Commission (MARCOM) contract, MCE hull 939, by the Bethlehem-Fairfield Shipyard, Baltimore, Maryland; she was sponsored by Mrs. Roberson Thompson, and launched on 5 February 1943.

== History ==
She was allocated to the Prudential Steamship Corp., on 15 February 1943.

On 8 November 1946, she was sold for $544,506, to Atlantic Maritime Company, Inc., for service. She scrapped in 1968.

== Bibliography ==
- "Bethlehem-Fairfield, Baltimore MD". www.ShipbuildingHistory.com. 7 August 2021.
- Maritime Administration. "George Shiras". Ship History Database Vessel Status Card. U.S. Department of Transportation, Maritime Administration.
- Davies, James (May 2004). "Specifications (As-Built)" (PDF). p. 23.
- "SS George Shiras".
