= USS Ascella =

Cargo ship of the United States Navy

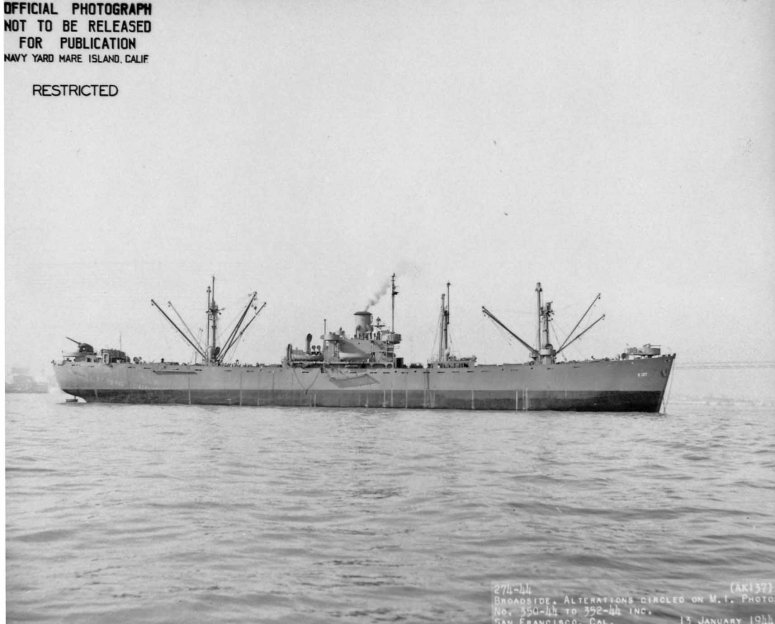
- Broadside view of USS Ascella (AK-137) off San Francisco, CA., 13 January 1944.

History

United States
- Name: George C. Yount
- Namesake: George C. Yount
- Owner: War Shipping Administration (WSA)
- Operator: American President Lines (APL)
- Ordered: as a Type EC2-S-C1 hull, MCE hull 708
- Builder: California Shipbuilding Corporation, Terminal Island, Los Angeles, California
- Yard number: 133
- Way number: 5
- Laid down: 7 January 1943
- Launched: 4 February 1943
- Sponsored by: Mrs. Elizabeth Rickenbacker (Eddie Rickenbacker's mother)
- In service: 21 February 1943
- Fate: transferred to the US Navy, 30 November 1943

United States
- Name: Ascella
- Namesake: The star Ascella
- Acquired: 30 November 1943
- Commissioned: 7 January 1944
- Decommissioned: 13 August 1946
- Renamed: Ascella, 14 December 1943
- Refit: modified for Naval service at Matson Navigation Company, San Francisco, California
- Stricken: 22 May 1947
- Identification: Hull symbol: AK-137; Code letters: NHDB
- Fate: Sold for scrapping, 7 July 1964, withdrawn, 27 July 1964

General characteristics
- Class & type: Crater-class cargo ship
- Type: Type EC2-S-C1
- Displacement: 4,023 long tons (4,088 t) (standard); 14,550 long tons (14,780 t) (full load)
- Length: 441 ft 6 in (134.57 m)
- Beam: 56 ft 11 in (17.35 m)
- Draft: 28 ft 4 in (8.64 m)
- Installed power: 2 × Western Pipe and Steel Company header-type boilers, 220psi 450°; 2,500 shp (1,900 kW)
- Propulsion: 1 × Joshua Hendy vertical triple-expansion reciprocating steam engine; 1 × shaft
- Speed: 12.5 kn (23.2 km/h; 14.4 mph)
- Capacity: 7,800 t (7,700 long tons) DWT; 444,206 cu ft (12,578.5 m^{3}) (non-refrigerated)
- Complement: 21 officers 180 enlisted
- Armament: 1 × 5 in (127 mm)/38 caliber dual-purpose (DP) gun; 1 × 3 in (76 mm)/50 caliber DP gun; 2 × 40 mm (1.57 in) Bofors anti-aircraft (AA) gun mounts; 6 × 20 mm (0.79 in) Oerlikon cannon AA gun mounts

USS Ascella (AK-137) was a Crater-class cargo ship commissioned by the US Navy for service in World War II. Ascella was named after Ascella, a star in the constellation Sagittarius. She was responsible for delivering troops, goods and equipment to locations in the Asiatic-Pacific Theater.

== Construction ==
Ascella was laid down 7 January 1943, under a Maritime Commission (MARCOM) contract, MC hull No. 708, as the Liberty ship SS George C. Yount, by California Shipbuilding Corporation, Terminal Island, Los Angeles, California; launched 4 February 1943; sponsored by Mrs. E. Rickenbacker; acquired by the Navy 30 November 1943; renamed Ascella 14 December 1943; converted by the Matson Navigation Company, San Francisco, California; and commissioned at Hunters Point, 7 January 1944.

== Service history ==
Two days after commissioning, the cargo ship arrived at the Naval Supply Depot, Oakland, California, to load stores, provisions, and ammunition. Following brief shakedown training, she departed San Francisco, California, on 21 January. Nine days later, Ascella entered port at Pearl Harbor and began discharging her cargo.

=== Delivering supplies to troops in the South Pacific ===
On 3 February, she shifted berths and began loading supplies bound for the US Army occupation garrison on newly won Kwajalein in the Marshall Islands. A week later, the vessel was put to sea and, after a nine-day voyage, entered the lagoon at Kwajalein. She spent the remainder of February unloading her cargo before departing Kwajalein on 3 March. After interrupting her voyage at Pearl Harbor to drop off three landing craft for repairs, the ship returned to the Naval Supply Depot, Oakland, on 23 March. There she took on another load of supplies, embarked 83 Navy men for passage to Hawaii, and stood out of San Francisco Bay. She entered Pearl Harbor on 10 April, and began a four-day visit during which her passengers disembarked and she loaded ammunition and armory equipment. On 14 April, Ascella set sail for the Marshall Islands with another 44 passengers embarked.

=== Replenishing Fifth Fleet ships ===
Upon her arrival in Majuro lagoon, the cargo ship began replenishing the warships of Task Force (TF) 58. During her sojourn there, she also provided berthing spaces for her officer passengers until the middle of the first week in May. On 6 June, she took on board 47 U.S. Marines for passage to Roi Island at Kwajalein, where the ship remained and loaded defective ammunition and empty shell cases until 21 June. On that day, Ascella embarked 51 Navy passengers and weighed anchor for Hawaii. She stopped at Oahu from 30 June to 3 July, to debark 24 of her passengers and unload her cargo. Another eight days at sea preceded her 11 July, arrival back at San Francisco.

=== Supporting Central Pacific bases ===
After disembarking the remaining 27 passengers, the ship started loading dry stores and provisions bound for the fleet in the Central Pacific. She got underway on 24 July, and reached Pearl Harbor on 1 August. During the next two days, the cargo ship debarked passengers and took on mail bound for the Central Pacific. Returning to sea on 3 August, Ascella resumed the voyage west and stood into the lagoon at Eniwetok Atoll on 15 August, for a month's visit. In addition to serving as station stores ship issuing supplies to various units of the fleet, she also provided berthing spaces for transient sailors. After transferring what remained of her cargo to Silica on 11 September, Ascella embarked 53 hospital patients for transportation to Hawaii on 16 September, and began the voyage that same day. She reached Pearl Harbor on 25 September, exchanged her patient-passengers for 56 California-bound sailors, and continued on her way on 27 September. On 6 October, the ship pulled into San Pedro, Los Angeles, and disembarked her passengers.

=== New Guinea operations ===
Three weeks of voyage repairs and cargo loading operations followed her return to the California coast. She got underway again on 27 October, to carry supplies, this time to the fleet in the southwestern Pacific. Ascella made a stop at Pearl Harbor to take on fuel and water before continuing on to her first destination, Finschhafen, New Guinea. She arrived at that port on 23 November, but remained only a few hours. Two days later, the cargoman hauled into Seeadler Harbor at the island of Manus in the Admiralties. Her stay there brought more provisioning duty and lasted until 15 December. On that day, the ship cleared Manus for a run to the Palaus and the Carolines.

=== New Zealand operations ===
Following stops at Kossol Passage and at Ulithi, she departed the latter port on 10 January 1945, and shaped a course for New Zealand. Ascella moored at Princess Dock, Auckland, on 24 January. Another consignment of general stores and provisions hoisted on board, she steamed out of Auckland on 1 February. The cargo ship delivered supplies to Nouméa, New Caledonia, between 5 and 9 February, and, with another group of passengers embarked, resumed her voyage. Ascella entered Seeadler Harbor once more on 16 February, and discharged supplies and passengers. Having exchanged one group of passengers for another, the ship returned to sea on 24 February.

=== Her last assignment of the war ===
Ascella and her passengers were bound for the same duty station, Ulithi Atoll in the Carolines. They arrived there on 28 February, and the cargo ship began her last assignment of World War II. Throughout the final campaigns -- Okinawa and the US 3rd Fleet–US 5th Fleet air assault on the Japanese home islands—the cargo ship remained at Ulithi issuing stores and provisions to the warships prosecuting those actions. One mission—a round-trip voyage from Ulithi to Pearl Harbor and back in late July and early August—interrupted her service in the lagoon. Her assignment as station stores ship at Ulithi ended nine days after the formal surrender of Japan.

=== End-of-war operations ===
On that day, 11 September 1945, she weighed anchor for similar duty at Okinawa in the Ryukyu Islands. After duty at Okinawa from 16 September to 23 October, Ascella moved on to Samar in the central Philippines where she issued stores and provisions from 5 November to 24 December. Forced to get underway on Christmas Eve Day, she celebrated the holiday at sea before entering Shanghai, China, on 30 December 1945. The cargo ship served as an accommodation ship at Shanghai through the first week of April 1946. On 10 April, she departed Shanghai and headed for the Marianas. Ascella performed some unspecified duty at Guam for about three weeks between 16 April and 5 May.

== Post-war assignments ==
On the latter day, the ship weighed anchor and set sail for the United States. Following 18 days at sea, she arrived back in San Francisco on 22 May. Later, she moved to Stockton, California, where she loaded provisions before getting underway on 29 June, for Hawaii. She arrived in the Pearl Harbor Naval Shipyard on 6 July, and began inactivation procedures. Ascella was placed out of commission at Pearl Harbor on 13 August 1946.

== Post-war decommissioning ==
There, she remained until the spring of 1947, when she was towed to San Francisco, to be returned to MARCOM. Her name was struck from the Navy list on 22 May 1947, her name was reverted to her merchant name, George C. Yount. She was transferred to MARCOM for layup with the National Defense Reserve Fleet, Suisun Bay Group, Benicia, California, 28 May 1947.

== Fate ==
On 7 July 1964, she was sold to National Metal & Steel Corporation, for $49,653.18, to be scrapped. She was removed from the fleet 27 July 1964.

== Awards ==
No battle stars are indicated for Ascella in current Navy records. However, her crew was eligible for the following medals and campaign ribbons:

- China Service Medal (extended)
- American Campaign Medal
- Asiatic-Pacific Campaign Medal (1)
- World War II Victory Medal
- Navy Occupation Service Medal (with Asia clasp)

== Notes ==
Citations

== Bibliography ==
Online resources

- "Ascella". Dictionary of American Naval Fighting Ships. Naval History and Heritage Command. 18 June 2015. This article incorporates text from this source, which is in the public domain.
- "California Shipbuilding, Los Angeles CA". ShipbuildingHistory.com. 13 October 2010.
- "USS Ascella (AK-137)". NavSource. 11 July 2014.
- "ASCELLA (AK-137)". United States Department of Transportation. Archived from the original on 12 December 2019.
- "GEORGE C. YOUNT". United States Department of Transportation. Archived from the original on 12 December 2019.
