= USS Justin (IX-228) =

WWII military passenger and mail ship

History

United States
- Name: Gus W. Darnell; Justin
- Namesake: Gus W. Darnell; Justin
- Ordered: as Gus W. Darnell
- Builder: Todd Houston Shipbuilding Corporation
- Launched: 22 May 1944
- Acquired: 2 September 1945
- Commissioned: 4 September 1945
- Decommissioned: 23 January 1946
- Identification: IX-228
- Fate: Sold 25 May 1954 and scrapped

General characteristics
- Displacement: 3,381 tons
- Length: 441 ft 6 in (134.57 m)
- Beam: 56 ft 11 in (17.35 m)
- Draft: 27 ft 11 in (8.51 m)
- Speed: 11 kn (20 km/h)
- Complement: 210
- Armament: 1 x 3 in (76 mm) gun; 1 x 5 in (130 mm) gun; 3 x 20 mm cannon

USS Justin (IX-228), formerly the liberty ship Gus W. Darnell, was built by Todd Houston Shipbuilding Corporation, Houston, Texas, in 1944. She was operated as a cargo ship in the Pacific and acquired by the US Navy on 2 September 1945; and commissioned at Guiuan Roadstead, Philippine Islands on 4 September 1945.

Justin departed for Shanghai, China, 20 October where she embarked naval passengers for transport to the United States. She picked up a cargo of 3,000 bags of mail at Guam before arriving San Francisco, California 23 December 1945. Justin decommissioned at San Francisco 23 January 1946 and was turned over to the War Shipping Administration. She was placed in the National Defense Reserve Fleet at Suisun Bay, California, until being sold 25 May 1954 to the Boston Metals Corporation and scrapped.
