= SS George Weems =

Liberty ship of WWII

History

United States
- Name: George Weems
- Namesake: George Weems
- Owner: War Shipping Administration (WSA)
- Operator: Moore-McCormack Lines, Inc.
- Ordered: as type (EC2-S-C1) hull, MCE hull 918
- Awarded: 1 January 1942
- Builder: Bethlehem-Fairfield Shipyard, Baltimore, Maryland
- Cost: $1,047,783
- Yard number: 2068
- Way number: 16
- Laid down: 19 August 1942
- Launched: 26 September 1942
- Sponsored by: Miss Elizabeth Chew Weems
- Completed: 7 October 1942
- Identification: Call sign: KHKI
- Fate: Sold to Norway, 10 November 1948

Norway
- Name: Myken
- Owner: Skibs A/S Mirva (1948—1950); A/S Mirva & A/S Fido (1950); Skibs A/S Mesna & A/S Fidelio (1951)
- Operator: Simonsen & Astrup (1948—1951)
- Fate: Sold, 1951

Panama
- Name: Cavolidi
- Owner: Halieta Cia. Nav., SA
- Operator: Orion Shipping & Trading Co.
- Fate: Sold, 1953

Panama
- Name: Cocle
- Owner: Cia Marittima Italo-Panamense (1953—1954); Farwest Maritime Trading Corp. (1954—1959)
- Operator: Cia Marittima Italo-Panamense (1953—1959)
- Fate: Sold, 1959

Panama
- Name: White Eagle
- Owner: White Eagle Maritime Co.
- Operator: Maritime Brokers Inc.
- Fate: Sold, 1963

Greece
- Name: White Eagle
- Owner: United White Shipping Co.
- Operator: S. Livanos
- Fate: Grounded 11 October 1966 and declared Total Loss

General characteristics
- Class & type: Liberty ship; type EC2-S-C1, standard
- Tonnage: 10,865 LT DWT; 7,176 GRT
- Displacement: 3,380 long tons (3,434 t) (light); 14,245 long tons (14,474 t) (max)
- Length: 441 feet 6 inches (135 m) oa; 416 feet (127 m) pp; 427 feet (130 m) lwl
- Beam: 57 feet (17 m)
- Draft: 27 ft 9.25 in (8.4646 m)
- Installed power: 2 × Oil fired 450 °F (232 °C) boilers, operating at 220 psi (1,500 kPa); 2,500 hp (1,900 kW)
- Propulsion: 1 × triple-expansion steam engine, (manufactured by General Machinery Corp., Hamilton, Ohio); 1 × screw propeller
- Speed: 11.5 knots (21.3 km/h; 13.2 mph)
- Capacity: 562,608 cubic feet (15,931 m^{3}) (grain); 499,573 cubic feet (14,146 m^{3}) (bale)
- Complement: 38–62 USMM; 21–40 USNAG
- Armament: Varied by ship; Bow-mounted 3-inch (76 mm)/50-caliber gun; Stern-mounted 4-inch (102 mm)/50-caliber gun; 2–8 × single 20-millimeter (0.79 in) Oerlikon anti-aircraft (AA) cannons and/or, 2–8 × 37-millimeter (1.46 in) M1 AA guns

SS George Weems was a Liberty ship built in the United States during World War II. She was named after George Weems, who in 1828, established steamship travel on the Rappahannock River.

== Construction ==
George Weems was laid down on 19 August 1942, under a Maritime Commission (MARCOM) contract, MCE hull 918, by the Bethlehem-Fairfield Shipyard, Baltimore, Maryland; she was sponsored by Miss Elizabeth Chew Weems, a descendant of George Weems, and was launched on 26 September 1942.

== History ==
She was allocated to Moore-McCormack Lines, Inc., on 7 October 1942. On 10 January 1948, she was grounded at 81°1′N 18°25′E and declared a Constructive Total Loss. On 10 November 1948, she was sold and transferred to Norway. After several owner and name changes, sailing as White Eagle, she was again grounded, this time on San Clemente Island, California, at 32°55′N 118°33′W, and again declared a Total Loss.

== Bibliography ==
- "Bethlehem-Fairfield, Baltimore MD". www.ShipbuildingHistory.com. 14 August 2008.
- Maritime Administration. "George Weems". Ship History Database Vessel Status Card. U.S. Department of Transportation, Maritime Administration.
- Davies, James (May 2004). "Specifications (As-Built)" (PDF). p. 23.
- "SS George Weems".
