= USS George Eastman =

American cargo ship laid down in 1943

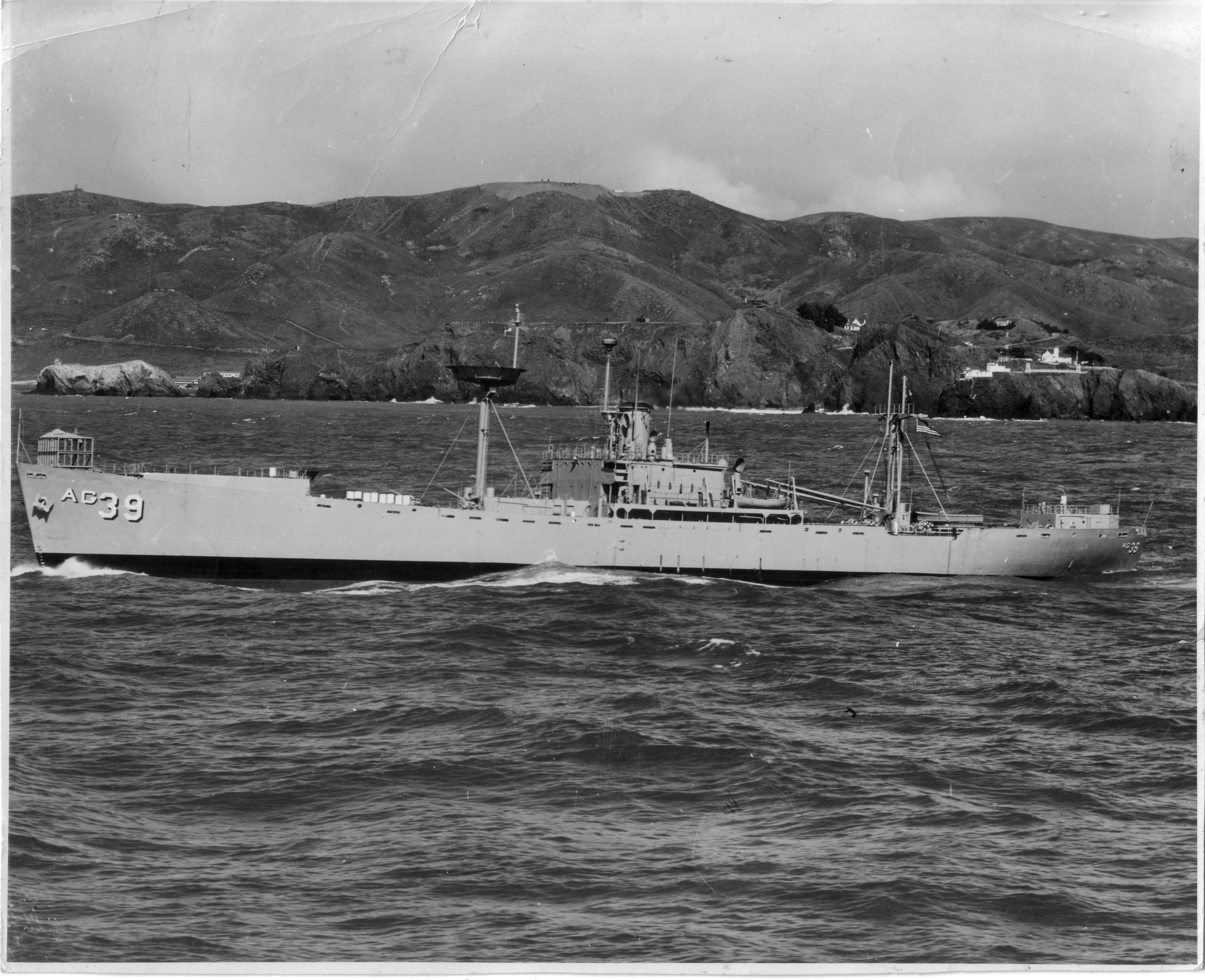
- USS George Eastman (YAG-39) after being refitted with scientific equipment

History

United States
- Name: George Eastman
- Namesake: George Eastman
- Builder: Permanente Metals Corp., Richmond, California
- Laid down: 24 March 1943
- Launched: 20 April 1943
- Acquired: 2 April 1953
- In service: 20 October 1953, as USS YAG-39
- Out of service: 21 October 1957
- Reclassified: YAG-39 (Miscellaneous Auxiliary Service Craft), May 1953
- Commissioned: 20 October 1962
- Renamed: USS George Eastman (YAG-39), 3 July 1963
- Fate: Sold for scrapping, 15 June 1976

General characteristics
- Type: Type EC2-S-C1 hull
- Displacement: 3,890 long tons (3,952 t) light; 11,600 long tons (11,786 t) full load
- Length: 442 ft (135 m)
- Beam: 57 ft (17 m)
- Draft: 30 ft (9.1 m)
- Propulsion: Reciprocating steam engine, single shaft, 1,950 shp (1,454 kW)
- Speed: 10 knots (19 km/h; 12 mph)
- Complement: 100
- Armament: None

USS George Eastman (YAG-39), a "Liberty-type" cargo ship, was laid down under Maritime Commission contract on 24 March 1943 by Permanente Metals Corp., Yard 2, Richmond, California; launched on 20 April 1943; sponsored by Mrs. Ann Troutman; and delivered under charter from War Shipping Administration to Pacific-Atlantic Steamship Co., Vancouver, Washington, on 5 May 1943.

== Merchant Cargo Carrier ==
She operated as a merchant cargo carrier until placed in the National Defense Reserve Fleet at Suisun Bay, California, on 24 June 1948. Later taken out of reserve, she was chartered to Pacific Far East Line, Inc., San Francisco, California, on 24 December 1951 and operated as a merchantman in the Far East during the Korean War. On 2 June 1952 she was transferred by the Maritime Administration to the custody of the U.S. Navy at Suisun Bay, California.

== Conversion to YAG-39 ==
Acquired by the U.S. Navy on 2 April 1953, she was designated YAG-39 the following month. She was then fitted out with numerous scientific instruments, including nuclear detection and measurement devices, which enabled her to conduct contamination and fallout measurement tests after nuclear explosions. Manned by an experimental crew in a specially protected control cubicle, she also was fitted with electronic remote control gear that enabled her to serve as a robot ship.

== Supporting atomic testing in the Pacific ==
Following extensive conversion, YAG-39 was placed in service at San Francisco, California, on 20 October 1953. Assigned to Joint Task Force 7, she steamed to Eniwetok, Marshall Islands, where from March through May 1954 she participated in atomic tests at the Pacific Proving Grounds. During "Operation Castle", a nuclear test series, she gathered fallout data and carried out experimental ship protection studies. After returning to San Francisco, California, she was placed out of service from June until February 1955.

In May, YAG-39 again served with Joint Task Force 7 during "Operation Wigwam", the deep underwater nuclear test carried out in the Eastern Pacific. During the next 10 months she operated between the West Coast and Hawaii, and conducted various experimental tests before returning to Eniwetok on 8 April 1956 to participate in additional nuclear tests. From 21 May to 23 July she took part in four nuclear-proving tests during Operation Redwing and gathered scientific data to advance knowledge of the atom and the effects of nuclear fission.

Departing Eniwetok on 28 July, YAG-39 steamed via Pearl Harbor to San Francisco, California, where she arrived on 16 August. After receiving additional scientific equipment, she departed San Francisco on 6 February 1957 to resume experimental operations off the California coast. During the next few months she steamed with YAG-40 while testing advanced weapons and ship protection systems. Towed to San Diego, California, 21 October for inactivation, she was placed out of service on 1 November and assigned to the Pacific Reserve Fleet at San Diego.

== Project 112 and Project SHAD ==
Reactivated in 1962, YAG-39 commissioned at San Francisco, California, on 20 October. With her sister ship, YAG-40, she departed San Francisco, California, on 15 November for Pearl Harbor, where she arrived 24 November for underway training. Assigned to Service Squadron 5, she operated off Hawaii and carried out extensive experimental tests in the fields of ship protection systems and scientific warfare analysis. On 3 July 1963 she was assigned her former merchant name, George Eastman.

From 1963, USS George Eastman operated as a research ship between the Hawaiian Sea Frontier and the equatorial area of the mid-Pacific, providing valuable support for various scientific research and defense projects of the Department of Defense. She sailed to the West Coast in April 1966 for a three-month overhaul; and, following her return to Pearl Harbor on 18 August, she resumed research cruises in Hawaiian waters. Her support activities continued through 1966 into 1967.

This ship participated in the U. S. Navy's Top Secret biological and chemical warfare testing program. Project SHAD, an acronym for Shipboard Hazard and Defense, was part of a larger effort called Project 112, which was conducted during the 1960s. Project SHAD encompassed tests designed to identify U.S. warships' vulnerabilities to attacks with chemical or biological warfare agents and to develop procedures to respond to such attacks while maintaining a war-fighting capability.from 1962 until 1972 when President Nixon officially discontinued the program. The USS George Eastman's sister ship, the USS Granville S. Hall (YAG-40) also participated as a floating laboratory and administrative command ship in Project SHAD along with five L.T. Tugboats, a submarine and aircraft. Sarin and VX nerve gas were sprayed on the USS George Eastman by the tugs and aircraft as well as E.coli, simulants for biological and chemical agents such as anthrax and a number of other diseases, tracers and mosquitoes.

USS George Eastman directly participated in the following Project 112/ Project SHAD tests:

- 63-1 Eager Belle I
- 63-1 Eager Belle II
- 64-2 Flower Drum I
- 65-4 Magic Sword
- 65-17 Fearless Johnny
- 66-13 Half Note

== Decommissioning ==
USS George Eastman was decommissioned (date unknown); struck From the Naval Register (date unknown); disposed of by MARAD sale, on 1 July 1976; and, final disposition, scrapped in 1977.

== See also ==
- Research vessel
- Nuclear testing
- United States Navy Designations (Temporary)
