= USS Granville S. Hall =

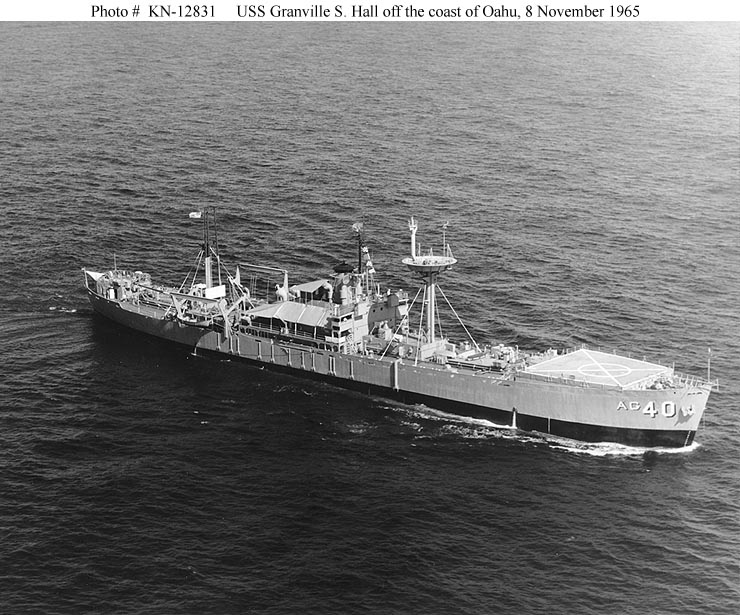
- USS Granville S. Hall off the coast of Oahu, 8 November 1965

History

United States
- Name: Granville S. Hall
- Namesake: Granville Stanley Hall
- Owner: War Shipping Administration (WSA)
- Operator: A.L.Burbank & Co., Ltd.
- Ordered: as type (EC2-S-C1) hull, MC hull 2325
- Builder: J.A. Jones Construction, Panama City, Florida
- Cost: $620,529
- Yard number: 66
- Way number: 4
- Laid down: 16 September 1944
- Launched: 24 October 1944
- Sponsored by: Mrs.Isabell Gabriel
- Completed: 7 November 1944
- Identification: Call sign: KTEK
- Fate: Placed in the Suisun Bay Reserve Fleet, Suisun Bay, California, 15 October 1948; Placed in the Suisun Bay Reserve Fleet, Suisun Bay, California, 9 June 1952; Transferred to US Navy, 18 May 1953

United States
- Name: YAG-40
- Acquired: 18 May 1953
- Out of service: 1957
- Fate: Placed in the Pacific Reserve Fleet, San Diego, California

United States
- Name: Granville S. Hall
- Commissioned: 20 October 1962
- Decommissioned: May 1971
- Stricken: May 1972
- Identification: Hull symbol: YAG-40; Call sign: NWOM
- Fate: Sold for scrapping, 31 January 1972, withdrawn from fleet, 9 March 1972

General characteristics
- Class & type: Liberty ship; type EC2-S-C1, standard
- Tonnage: 10,865 LT DWT; 7,176 GRT
- Displacement: 3,380 long tons (3,434 t) (light); 14,245 long tons (14,474 t) (max)
- Length: 441 feet 6 inches (135 m) oa; 416 feet (127 m) pp; 427 feet (130 m) lwl
- Beam: 57 feet (17 m)
- Draft: 27 ft 9.25 in (8.4646 m)
- Installed power: 2 × Oil fired 450 °F (232 °C) boilers, operating at 220 psi (1,500 kPa); 2,500 hp (1,900 kW)
- Propulsion: 1 × triple-expansion steam engine, (manufactured by Filer and Stowell, Milwaukee, Wisconsin); 1 × screw propeller
- Speed: 11.5 knots (21.3 km/h; 13.2 mph)
- Capacity: 562,608 cubic feet (15,931 m^{3}) (grain); 499,573 cubic feet (14,146 m^{3}) (bale)
- Complement: 38–62 USMM; 21–40 USNAG
- Armament: Varied by ship; Bow-mounted 3-inch (76 mm)/50-caliber gun; Stern-mounted 4-inch (102 mm)/50-caliber gun; 2–8 × single 20-millimeter (0.79 in) Oerlikon anti-aircraft (AA) cannons and/or, 2–8 × 37-millimeter (1.46 in) M1 AA guns

Granville S. Hall was a Liberty ship named after Granville S. Hall. She was built at the J.A. Jones Construction, Panama City, Florida, and launched in 1944, to serve as a civilian cargo ship. In 1953 she was acquired by the United States Navy for use as a miscellaneous auxiliary service craft under the designation YAG-40. As YAG-40 she took part in Operation Castle before being laid up again in 1957. Reactivated in 1962, she was commissioned as Granville S. Hall (YAG-40) and participated in Project SHAD and Project 112. She was scrapped in 1972.

== Service history ==
Granville S. Hall (YAG-40) was laid down on 16 September 1944, under a Maritime Commission (MARCOM) contract, MC hull 2325, as the Liberty Ship Granville S. Hall, by J.A. Jones Construction, Panama City, Florida. She was launched 24 October 1944, sponsored by Mrs. Isabelle Gabriel, wife of resident MARCOM plant engineer; and placed in service 7 November 1944, for cargo ship duty with A.L.Burbank & Co., Ltd. She entered the National Defense Reserve Fleet at Suisun Bay in California, 15 October 1948.

Granville S. Hall was taken out of reserve in May 1953, and transferred to the US Navy and designated YAG-40. She was fitted out with scientific instruments of all kinds, including nuclear detection and measurement devices which enabled her to explore fallout areas and carry out ship decontamination tests. Granville S. Hall was also equipped with remote control devices which allowed her to be operated by a small crew in a sealed hold, and thus making her able to explore fallout areas of heavy concentration. She took part in the Operation Castle atomic bomb tests from March to May 1954, and other radioactivity and remote control tests. She was placed in the San Diego Reserve Fleet, in late 1957.

Reactivated again in May 1962, she was placed in commission 20 October 1962, as Granville S. Hall (YAG-40), at Triple A Machine Shop, San Francisco, California. Granville S. Hall and her sister ship, George Eastman, were ordered to Pearl Harbor, Hawaii, arriving there 24 November, for underway training. Following completion of training she resumed her scientific work.

During the remainder of the 1960s, AG-40 served as a floating laboratory and administrative command ship during Project SHAD ("Shipboard Hazards & Defense") and Project 112, where their mission was to evaluate the effectiveness of shipboard detection and protective procedures against biological/chemical warfare agents and to determine the distance released agents could travel. A measure of plutonium contamination on Johnston Atoll was another mission for the ship. During the remainder of the decade, she served in connection with Project SHAD ("Shipboard Hazards & Defense"), an investigation of the threats posed to Navy ships by chemical and biological agents. During the Apollo 13 mission, Granville S. Hall was pressed into Task Force 130 as the backup recovery vessel waiting near the predicted constant-gee target point while the Iwo Jima waited at the primary target point. These missions ended in the early 1970s and, in May 1971, after a rescue mission to the La Balsa expedition, Granville S. Hall was stricken from the Naval Vessel Register and turned over to the Maritime Administration. She was sold for scrapping in March 1972.

== Bibliography ==
- "Granville S. Hall (YAG-40)". Dictionary of American Naval Fighting Ships. Navy Department, Naval History and Heritage Command. 13 July 2015. This article incorporates text from this source, which is in the public domain.
- "Jones Construction, Panama City FL". www.ShipbuildingHistory.com. 13 October 2010.
- Davies, James (May 2004). "Specifications (As-Built)" (PDF). p. 23.
- "SS Granville S. Hall".
- "USS Granville S. Hall (YAG-40)". NavSource. 24 February 2017.
