= USS Resolute =

USS Resolute may refer to the following ships operated by the United States Navy:

- USS Resolute (1860), a steamer in commission from 1861 to 1865
- USS Resolute (1894), an auxiliary cruiser and transport in commission from 1898 to 1899
- USS Resolute (SP-1309), a tug in commission from 1918 to 1919
- USS Resolute (SP-3218), a tug in commission in 1919
- USS Resolute (SP-3003), a motorboat placed in commission as a ship's tender in 1918
- USS Resolute (YT-458), a tug in commission from May 1943 to November 1944 which was renamed USS Evea (YT-458) in June 1943
- USS Resolute (AFDM-10), a medium auxiliary floating drydock
- HSV Resolute (JHSV-5), a joint high speed vessel completed in 2015 as USNS Trenton (T-EPF-5)
