= SP5 =

SP5 may refer to:

- 1982 SP5, an alternate name for 9915 Potanin, a C-type main belt asteroid
- 1978 SP5, an alternate name for 15675 Goloseevo, a Main-belt Asteroid discovered on September 27, 1978
- SP5, a postcode in the SP postcode area
- sp5, spinal trigeminal tract and nucleus
- A civilian variant of the Heckler & Koch MP5
- Socket SP5, a CPU socket for AMD server CPUs

SP-5 may refer to:

- USS Tacony (SP-5), an armed yacht that served in the United States Navy as a patrol vessel from 1917 to 1918
- one of the three versions of the 9x39 mm rifle cartridge
- Specialist Fifth Class, a rank in the United States Army
- a model of steam toy made by British manufacturer Mamod
