= Port of Detroit =

- Interactive map of Port of Detroit

Location
- Country: United States
- Location: Detroit, Michigan
- Coordinates: 42°15′27″N 83°7′20″W

Details
- Opened: 1933
- Owned by: Detroit/Wayne County Port Authority
- Type of Harbor: Natural
- Land area: 80 acres (32 ha)
- Executive Director: Mark Schrupp
- Chairman: Jonathan C. Kinloch

Statistics
- Vessel arrivals: 1,333 (2011)
- Annual cargo tonnage: 13,738,737 (2011)
- Website portdetroit.com

The Port of Detroit is located along the west side of the Detroit River, and is the largest inland port in the state of Michigan. The port is overseen by the Detroit/Wayne County Port Authority, a five-member board of directors appointed by the State of Michigan, Wayne County and the City of Detroit. The authority coordinates river commerce on the waters and shoreline of Wayne County. The port consists of multiple marine terminals handling general, liquid, and bulk cargo as well as passengers. The Port of Detroit's single most valuable commodity is steel, and the largest commodity handled by tonnage is ore. Other important commodities handled at the port include stone, coal and cement.

== Overview ==
The port authority is governed by a board composed of five members. Two members are appointed by the government of the city of Detroit, two members are appointed by the Wayne County Commission and one member is appointed by the Governor of Michigan. These parties also provide the operational funding for the authority. Day-to-day operations are overseen by a hired executive director. The authority is charged with the assisting in the application doling out of state and federal grants, as well as facilitating capital improvements of the port. The authority is also involved in environmental programs, such as removing abandoned vessels from local waterways, and is permitted to finance bonds for port terminals or other development along the riverfront.

== History ==
The Detroit Wayne County Port District was established in 1933, though, the Detroit/Wayne County Port Authority was not organized until 1978. The first board meeting of the authority was held on October 10, 1980, and Henry Ford II was chosen as its first chairman.

In March 2021, the authority and the Ambassador Port Co., owned by the Moroun family, came to an agreement to terminate its Master Concession Agreement (MCA) entered into in 2005. Ambassador Port Co. loaned the authority $2.1 million to avoid the authority's default on bonds issued by the city-owned Detroit Port Development Co.. In exchange, Ambassador Port Co. became the sole operator of the port for a 100 year term. Though the agreement specified that 2.5% of net profit from port operations was to go to the authority, all of this revenue was used to pay down the loan; with no other significant revenue-generating operations, the authority had only paid $100,000 of the principal on the loan. The termination of the deal proposes to forgive the authority's loan, provided it with $1 million for general use, and requires Ambassador Port Co. to spend $2 million in blight removal. In exchange, Ambassador Port Co. would acquire NT&D Detroit Terminal. As of March 2025, the City of Detroit still had not approved the deal to terminate the Master Concession Agreement.

== Facilities ==
=== Freight ===
The Port of Detroit contains a number of terminals in Detroit, River Rouge, and Ecorse. General cargo is processed through the NT&D Detroit Terminal and the NT&D Ecorse Terminal, operated by Nicholson Terminal & Dock Company. Specific liquid and bulk cargoes are processed at other terminals along the Detroit and Rouge rivers. All marine terminals at the Port of Detroit are privately owned and operated.

=== Passenger ===
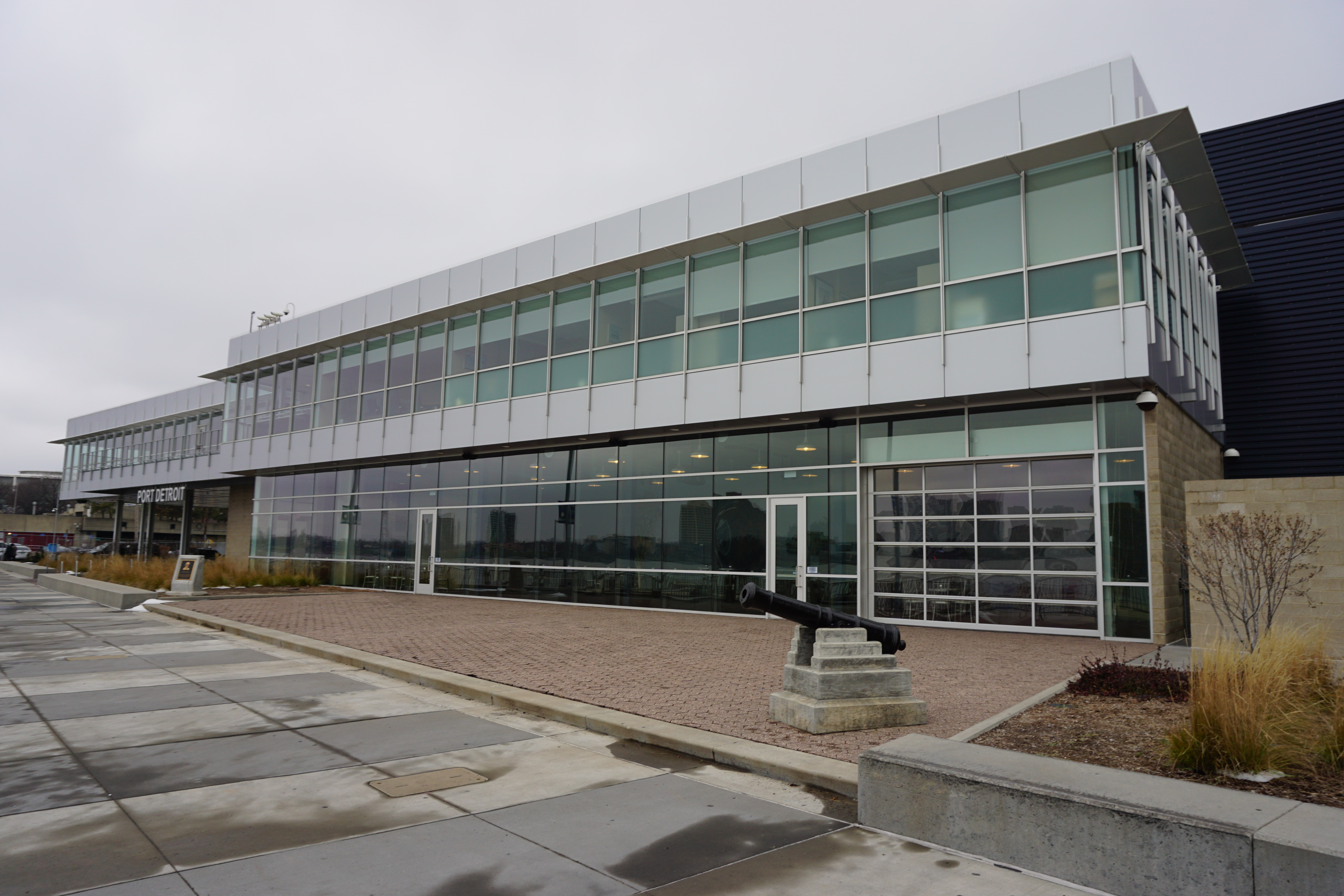
Port Detroit

The port authority opened the $22 million Carl M. Levin Public Dock and Terminal on July 18, 2011 to attract Great Lakes cruise ships, and possibly to begin passenger ferry service between Detroit and Windsor, Ontario. The two-story, 21,000 square foot terminal is located at 130 East Atwater Street between the Renaissance Center and Hart Plaza, and includes a 250-foot off-shore wharf. A customs processing area is located on the first floor of the terminal building, and a public lounge and open-air balcony is located on the second floor. The offices for the Detroit/Wayne County Port Authority are also located in the facility.

== See also ==
- List of ports in the United States
- United States ports
