= SS Henry S. Sanford =

Liberty ship of WWII

History

United States
- Name: Henry S. Sanford
- Namesake: Henry S. Sanford
- Owner: War Shipping Administration (WSA)
- Operator: Overlakes Freight Corp.
- Ordered: as type (EC2-S-C1) hull, MC hull 2467
- Awarded: 23 April 1943
- Builder: St. Johns River Shipbuilding Company, Jacksonville, Florida
- Cost: $1,387,330
- Yard number: 31
- Way number: 1
- Laid down: 22 December 1943
- Launched: 19 February 1944
- Sponsored by: Miss Eleanor G. Huff
- Completed: 4 March 1944
- Identification: Call sign: KWBZ
- Fate: Laid up in the, National Defense Reserve Fleet, Olympia, Washington, 28 May 1946; Sold for scrapping, 7 August 1970, removed from fleet, 21 September 1970

General characteristics
- Class & type: Liberty ship; type EC2-S-C1, standard
- Tonnage: 10,865 LT DWT; 7,176 GRT
- Displacement: 3,380 long tons (3,434 t) (light); 14,245 long tons (14,474 t) (max)
- Length: 441 feet 6 inches (135 m) oa; 416 feet (127 m) pp; 427 feet (130 m) lwl
- Beam: 57 feet (17 m)
- Draft: 27 ft 9.25 in (8.4646 m)
- Installed power: 2 × Oil fired 450 °F (232 °C) boilers, operating at 220 psi (1,500 kPa); 2,500 hp (1,900 kW)
- Propulsion: 1 × triple-expansion steam engine, (manufactured by General Machinery Corp., Hamilton, Ohio); 1 × screw propeller
- Speed: 11.5 knots (21.3 km/h; 13.2 mph)
- Capacity: 562,608 cubic feet (15,931 m^{3}) (grain); 499,573 cubic feet (14,146 m^{3}) (bale)
- Complement: 38–62 USMM; 21–40 USNAG
- Armament: Varied by ship; Bow-mounted 3-inch (76 mm)/50-caliber gun; Stern-mounted 4-inch (102 mm)/50-caliber gun; 2–8 × single 20-millimeter (0.79 in) Oerlikon anti-aircraft (AA) cannons and/or, 2–8 × 37-millimeter (1.46 in) M1 AA guns

SS Henry S. Sanford was a Liberty ship built in the United States during World War II. She was named after Henry S. Sanford, a wealthy American diplomat and businessman from Connecticut who served as United States Minister to Belgium from 1861 to 1869. Sanford is also known for founding the city of Sanford, Florida, and for successfully lobbying the United States into recognizing King Leopold II's claim to the Congo region in central Africa.

== Construction ==
Henry S. Sanford was laid down on 22 December 1943, under a Maritime Commission (MARCOM) contract, MC hull 2467, by the St. Johns River Shipbuilding Company, Jacksonville, Florida; she was sponsored by Miss Eleanor G. Huff, the daughter of Colonel P. Huff, US Army, and was launched on 19 February 1944.

== History ==
She was allocated to the Overlakes Freight Corp., on 4 March 1944. On 28 May 1946, she was laid up in the National Defense Reserve Fleet, Olympia, Washington. On 22 April 1954, she was withdrawn from the fleet to be loaded with grain under the "Grain Program 1954", she returned loaded on 29 May 1954. On 27 January 1957, she was withdrawn to be unload, she returned on empty 5 February 1957. She was sold for scrapping, 7 August 1970, to Zidell Explorations, Inc. She was removed from the fleet on 21 September 1970.

== Bibliography ==
- "St. John's River Shipbuilding, Jacksonville FL". www.ShipbuildingHistory.com. 16 October 2010.
- Maritime Administration. "Henry S. Sanford". Ship History Database Vessel Status Card. U.S. Department of Transportation, Maritime Administration.
- Davies, James (May 2004). "Specifications (As-Built)" (PDF). p. 23.
- "SS Henry S. Sanford".
