= SS Senator =

Steel-hulled Great Lakes freighter that sank on Lake Michigan

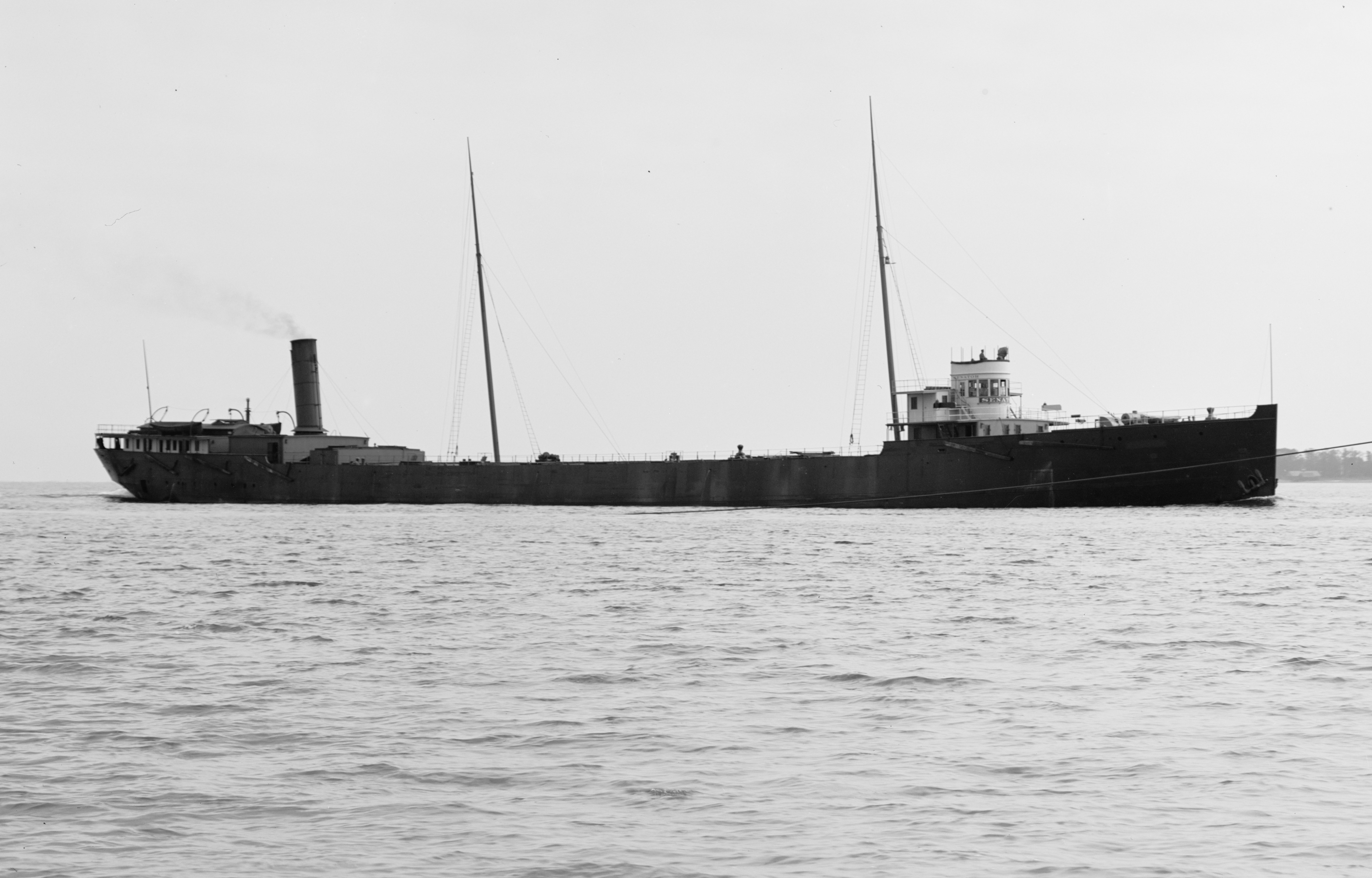
- Senator prior to her sinking

History

United States
- Name: Senator
- Operator: Nicholson Universal Steamship Company
- Port of registry: United States, Detroit, Michigan
- Launched: June 20, 1896
- Completed: 1896
- In service: July 25, 1896
- Out of service: October 31, 1929
- Identification: U.S. Registry #116725
- Fate: Rammed by the freighter Marquette in heavy fog on Lake Michigan

General characteristics
- Class & type: Bulk freighter
- Tonnage: 4,048.75 GRT; 3,178.66 NRT
- Length: 410 ft (120 m)
- Beam: 45.6 ft (13.9 m)
- Height: 28 ft (8.5 m)
- Installed power: 2 × Scotch marine boilers
- Propulsion: 1,450 hp (1,080 kW) triple expansion steam engine

National Register of Historic Places data
SENATOR (steam screw) Shipwreck
U.S. National Register of Historic Places
Location within Wisconsin Location within the United States
Location	Ozaukee County, Wisconsin
Nearest city	Port Washington, Wisconsin
Coordinates	43.335644°N 87.569846°W
Built	1896
Architect	Detroit Dry Dock Company
Architectural style	Freighter
MPS	Great Lakes Shipwreck Sites of Wisconsin MPS
NRHP reference No.	15000738
Added to NRHP	April 12, 2016

SS Senator was a steel-hulled Great Lakes freighter that sank on Lake Michigan with the loss of nine lives and 268 Nash automobiles, on Halloween of 1929 after she was rammed in heavy fog by the bulk carrier Marquette. She lies in 450 feet (140 m) of water 16 miles northeast of Port Washington, Wisconsin. On April 12, 2016 her wreck was listed on the National Register of Historic Places.

== History ==
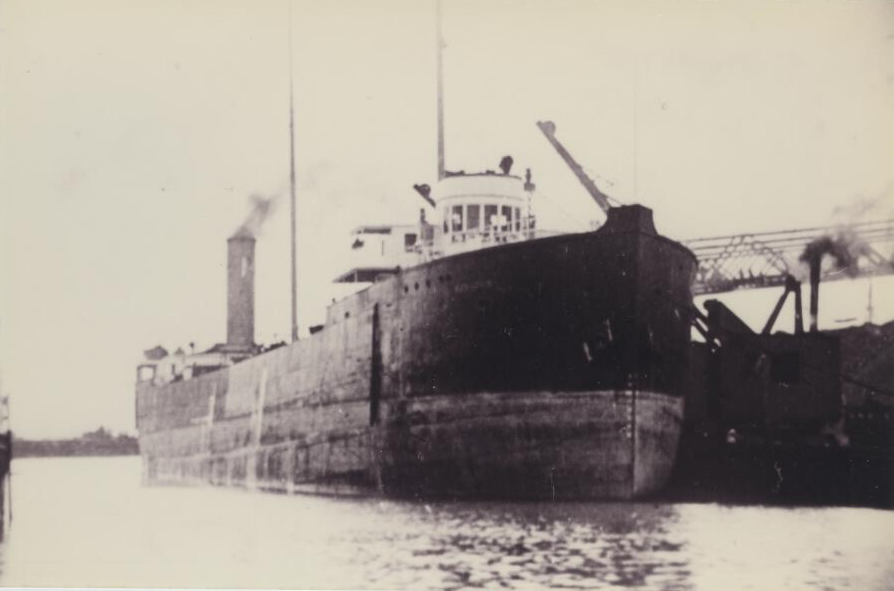
Senator loading coal

Senator (Official number 116725) was built in 1896 by the Detroit Dry Dock Company of Wyandotte, Michigan. Her hull had an overall length of 420 feet (130 m), and she was 410 feet (120 m) between her perpendiculars, her beam was 45.6 feet (13.9 m) wide and her cargo hold was 28 feet (8.5 m) deep. She had a gross register tonnage of 4048.75 tons and a net tonnage of 3178.66 tons. She was powered by a 1,450-horsepower (1,081 kW) triple expansion steam engine which was fueled by two coal-burning Scotch marine boilers.

Senator was launched on June 20, 1896 as hull number #122. She entered service on July 25, 1896. Senator was used to carry bulk cargoes such as iron ore, coal and later automobiles. She was also built using two unique early Great Lakes bulk carrier building techniques which were steel arches and a moveable water ballast system. She was originally owned by the Wolverine Steamship Company of Detroit, Michigan and named for George W. Roby (1823-1900), a retired Michigan lumberman whose son, John B. Roby, was president of the company. George W. Roby had been a state senator in Ohio before moving to Ludington, Michigan in 1871 and already had a wooden steamer of 1889 named for him.

At the time of Senator's launching, the newspaper Marine Review wrote two articles speaking of the steamer's characteristics. The first article published on June 11, 1896, reads:

Matters in the ship yard of the Detroit Dry Dock Co. at Wyandotte are being arranged for the launching of the big steel steamer Senator on Saturday, the 13th. The Senator is one of the steamers of the 400-foot type and will be owned by the Wolverine Steamship Co., of which John B. Roby is president and in which Senator McMillan and other stockholders of the dry dock company are interested. The steamer will be managed by Capt. M.W. Humphries. She is 420 feet long over all, 400 feet keel, 45 feet beam and 28 feet deep, and will be propelled by a triple expansion engine with cylinders 22, 35 and 60 inches in diameter by 44 inches stroke. It is expected that on 16 feet draft she will carry about 4,800 gross tons of ore and that with this load her engines, which are of 1,400 horse power, will drive her at the rate of 13 miles an hour. A feature in this boat is a patent anchor in the extreme stern. This is to be used in case of emergency in the "Soo" river and other narrow channels when through current or the influence of a passing vessel control of the big steamer is lost and she begins to swing so as to bring her into dangerous proximity to another boat or to a rock or dock. She will carry one smokestack, two short spars forward of this, will be fitted with Howden hot draft, and will have a complete electric lighting plant, search light, full handling equipment, telephones to connect the master or pilot with distant parts of the ship, etc. Alike to other big coarse freight carriers of her kind, she will have no deck house or in fact anything between the boiler house and texas excepting the deck engines. The Senator will be sailed by Capt. H.B. McQueen, who has been in the Marina, S.S. Curry, Geo. F. McWilliams, John F. Eddy and other steamers.

The second article which was published on June 25, 1896, reads:

The big freight steamer Senator, which was launched Saturday at the Wyandotte yard of the Detroit Dry Dock Co., was quite fully described in our issue of June 11 on page 11. She is 420 feet long over all, 400 feet keel 45 feet beam and 28 feet deep, with twelve hatches and a water bottom 5 ½ feet deep. Two of the hatches are forward of the pilot house, but the after house is placed far in the stern, giving a clear deck as in other steamers of her kind. Cylinders of engines are 22, 36 and 58 inches diameter by 44 inches stroke, and there are two boilers, each 13 feet 6 inches by 12 feet, allowed 165 pounds working pressure. The two Rockefeller steamers building at Wyandotte will be in nearly all respects similar to this boat. The Senator is owned by the Wolverine Steamship Co. of Detroit, composed of John B. Roby, president and general manager; James McMillan, C.L. Freer, F.J. Hecker, M.W. Humphrey, the estate of the late Capt. Peck, A. McVittie and others. She will be sailed by Capt. E.B. McQueen with Andrew Carter as chief engineer.

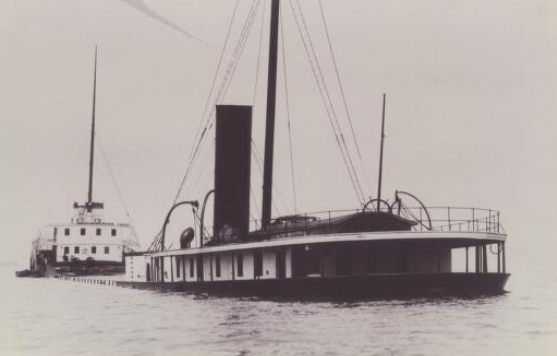
Senator sunk at Pipe Island

In 1898 Senator loaded 224,000 bushels of corn at Milwaukee, Wisconsin which was one of the largest cargoes loaded at that port, at that time.

In June 1898 Senator got stuck on Ballard's Reef near Detroit.

On August 21, 1909 Senator suffered what was possibly the most significant incident in her career prior to her sinking, and that was when the steamer Norman B. Ream struck and sank her off Pipe Island in the St Marys River. Norman B. Ream tore a large hole in her starboard side, and her crew had hardly any time to run her on the middle ground before her hull filled with water. On September 12, 1909 Senator was raised and taken to a dock. On October 6, 1909 Senator was towed into the port of Cleveland, Ohio. On the following day she was placed in Dry Dock No.2 for repairs which cost $90,000. She was out of commission for the rest of the shipping season.

== Final voyage and sinking ==
On October 31. 1929 Senator, under the command of Captain George Kinch was transporting a cargo of 268 Nash automobiles (worth $251,000) from Milwaukee, Wisconsin to Detroit, Michigan. Meanwhile, the ore carrier Marquette, under the command of Captain W.F. Amesbury was bound from Escanaba, Michigan for the steel mills of Indiana with a load of iron ore. The two ships collided, with Senator sinking in 8 minutes. Several of the crew jumped into the water while others made it onto the Marquette. A tugboat rescued 15 men from the lake. Of the crew of 28, seven died. The dead included Captain Kinch.

== Discovery of the wreck ==
The exact location of the Senator was discovered by Paul Ehorn and Rob Polich in 2005. The depth at the wreck site is 450 feet (140 m).
