= SS Frederick Bartholdi =

World War II Liberty ship of the United States

History

United States
- Name: Frederick Bartholdi
- Namesake: Frederick Bartholdi
- Ordered: as type (EC2-S-C1) hull, MC hull 1503
- Builder: J.A. Jones Construction, Brunswick, Georgia
- Cost: $1,655,794
- Yard number: 119
- Way number: 3
- Laid down: 29 August 1943
- Launched: 9 November 1943
- Sponsored by: Mrs. O.H. Hall
- Completed: 20 November 1943
- Identification: Call Signal: KTMO
- Fate: Ran aground, 24 December 1943; Scrapped, September 1944

General characteristics
- Class & type: Liberty ship; type EC2-S-C1, standard
- Tonnage: 10,865 LT DWT; 7,176 GRT
- Displacement: 3,380 long tons (3,434 t) (light); 14,245 long tons (14,474 t) (max)
- Length: 441 feet 6 inches (135 m) oa; 416 feet (127 m) pp; 427 feet (130 m) lwl
- Beam: 57 feet (17 m)
- Draft: 27 ft 9.25 in (8.4646 m)
- Installed power: 2 × Oil fired 450 °F (232 °C) boilers, operating at 220 psi (1,500 kPa); 2,500 hp (1,900 kW)
- Propulsion: 1 × triple-expansion steam engine, (manufactured by General Machinery Corp., Hamilton, Ohio); 1 × screw propeller
- Speed: 11.5 knots (21.3 km/h; 13.2 mph)
- Capacity: 562,608 cubic feet (15,931 m^{3}) (grain); 499,573 cubic feet (14,146 m^{3}) (bale)
- Complement: 38–62 USMM; 21–40 USNAG
- Armament: Varied by ship; Bow-mounted 3-inch (76 mm)/50-caliber gun; Stern-mounted 4-inch (102 mm)/50-caliber gun; 2–8 × single 20-millimeter (0.79 in) Oerlikon anti-aircraft (AA) cannons and/or, 2–8 × 37-millimeter (1.46 in) M1 AA guns

SS Frederick Bartholdi was a Liberty ship built in the United States during World War II. She was named after Frédéric Bartholdi, French sculptor who is best known for designing Liberty Enlightening the World, commonly known as the Statue of Liberty.

== Construction ==
Frederick Bartholdi was laid down on 29 August 1943, under a Maritime Commission (MARCOM) contract, MC hull 1503, by J.A. Jones Construction, Brunswick, Georgia; sponsored by Mrs. O.H. Hall, and launched on 9 November 1943.

== History ==
She was allocated to the West India Steamship Company, on 11 November 1943. On 24 December 1943, she ran aground off Skye, Scotland, 57°44′N 06°26′W while on passage from Jacksonville to London, with a general cargo. By the time a dive survey was undertaken, 10 weeks later, her hull had split, with the fore part of the ship being only connected to the stern by the deck plating. She was declared a constructive total loss (CTL), but as her cargo could not be safely unloaded in situ, so she was refloated using a new type of flexible rubber patches and beached in Uig Bay, on 22 June 1944, where her cargo was salvaged. She was subsequently towed to the River Clyde, and scrapped in September 1944, at Kames Bay.

== Bibliography ==
- "Jones Construction, Brunswick GA". www.ShipbuildingHistory.com. 13 October 2010.
- "Liberty Ships – World War II".
- Maritime Administration. "Frederick Bartholdi". Ship History Database Vessel Status Card. U.S. Department of Transportation, Maritime Administration. Archived from the original on 12 December 2019.
- Davies, James (May 2004). "Specifications (As-Built)" (PDF). p. 23.
- "SS Frederick Bartholdi".
- Sawyer, L.A.; Mitchell, W.H. (1970). The Liberty ships: the history of the 'Emergency' type cargo ships constructed in the United States during World War II (Rev. ed.). Newton Abbot: David & Charles. p. 81. ISBN 0715349074.
- Elphick, Peter (2001). Liberty : the ships that won the war. Annapolis, Md.: Naval Institute Press. pp. 303–304. ISBN 1557505357.
