= USS Sanderling (AMCU-49) =

Minesweeper of the United States Navy

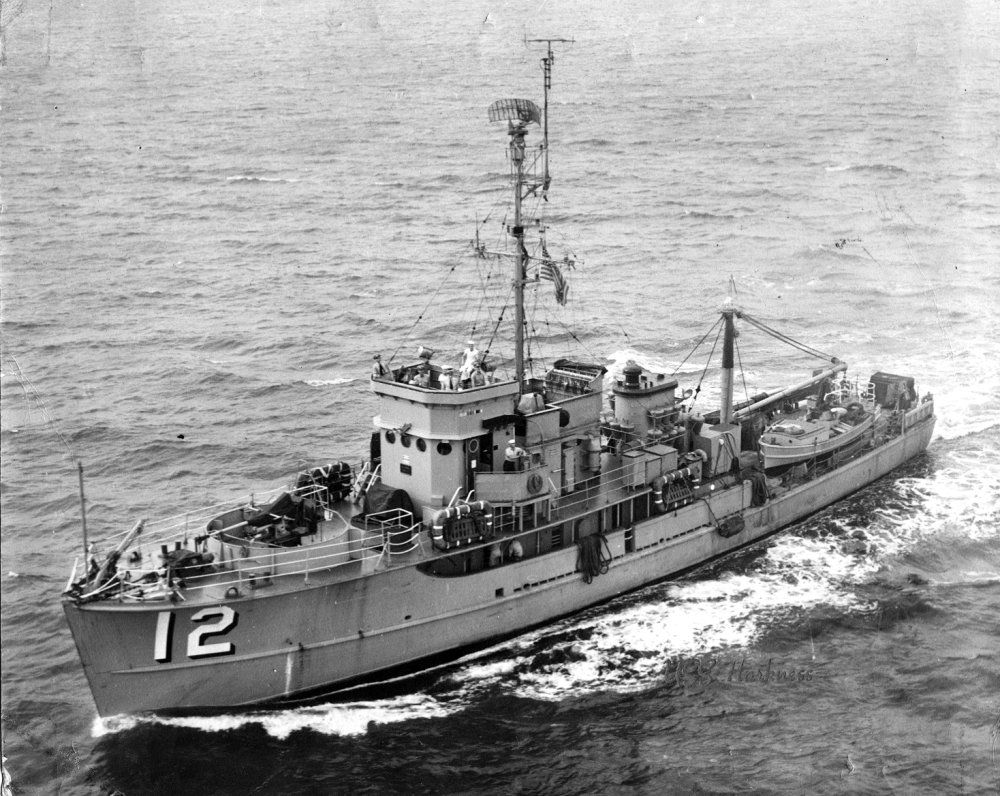
- A YMS-1-class minesweeper

History

United States
- Name: USS PCS-1393
- Builder: Robert Jacob Inc.; City Island, New York
- Laid down: 22 May 1943
- Reclassified: YMS-446, 27 September 1943
- Launched: 26 February 1944
- Sponsored by: Mrs. Joseph K. Harvey
- Commissioned: 9 June 1944
- Renamed: USS Sanderling (AMS-35), 17 February 1947
- Namesake: sanderling
- Reclassified: AMCU-49, 1 February 1955; MHC-59, 7 February 1955
- Decommissioned: 14 November 1957
- Stricken: 1 November 1959
- Honors and awards: 1 battle star, post-World War II minesweeping operations
- Fate: Berthed at Green Cove Springs, Florida

General characteristics
- Class & type: lead ship of the YMS-446 subclass of YMS-1-class minesweeper
- Displacement: 320 t.
- Length: 136 ft (41 m)
- Beam: 24 ft 6 in (7.47 m)
- Draft: 8 ft (2.4 m)
- Propulsion: 2 × 880 bhp General Motors 8-268A diesel engines; 2 shafts
- Speed: 13 knots (24 km/h)
- Complement: 38
- Armament: 1 × 3"/50 caliber gun mount; 2 × 20 mm guns; 2 × depth charge projectors

USS Sanderling (AMS-35/AMCU-49/MHC-49/YMS-446/PCS-1393) was the lead ship of her subclass of YMS-1-class minesweepers built for the United States Navy during World War II.

== History ==
Sanderling was laid down as PCS-1393 on 22 May 1943 by Robert Jacob Inc. of City Island, New York; launched on 26 February 1944; sponsored by Mrs. Joseph K. Harvey; and commissioned on 9 June 1944.

Initially assigned to the 3rd Naval District, YMS-446 operated in the Staten Island, New York area until 23 July 1945 when she got underway for California. She arrived at Newport Beach, California, on 22 August; and, in September, was routed farther west. From 25 September to 11 October, she conducted exercises out of Pearl Harbor; then continued on across the Pacific.

On 2 November, she arrived at Fukuoka, Japan; and, for the remainder of the year, cleared shipping lanes to that northern Kyūshū manufacturing port. During January and February 1946, she conducted similar minesweeping operations off the northern coast of the Inland Sea to ensure safe passage to and from Kure. She completed her postwar sweeping duties in mid-February and, on the 28th, departed Japan.

YMS-446 then steamed east. After stops in the Marianas, the Marshalls, and the Hawaiian Islands, she arrived at San Pedro, California, on 14 April; and, in May, put into Charleston, South Carolina. During July and August, she underwent overhaul; then, because of personnel shortages, she remained immobilized into December.

Early in 1947, the YMS departed Charleston for Key West, Florida, but returned in February. On the 17th, she was redesignated Sanderling (AMS-35)). On the 18th, she got underway for fleet maneuvers off Puerto Rico; but, later in the day, collided with a Norwegian merchant ship and was towed to Norfolk, Virginia, for repairs. In May, she returned to Charleston; and, two months later, she moved south to conduct operations off Florida for the Mine Countermeasure Station, Panama City, Florida. In November, she returned to South Carolina for indefinite berthing at the Minecraft Base at Charleston.

In May 1948, Sanderling resumed operations along the east and Gulf Coasts, from Newfoundland to the Mississippi River and in the Caribbean. Based at Norfolk and then at Charleston, she operated primarily from Hampton Roads, Virginia, south for the next nine years; participating in type and fleet exercises and providing services for the Operational Development Force.

During that period, she was redesignated twice: to AMCU-49, effective 1 February 1955; and to MHC-49, effective7 February 1955.

In mid-September 1957, she arrived at Green Cove Springs, Florida, and joined the Reserve Fleet. Two months later, on 14 November, she was decommissioned. Sanderling remained berthed at Green Cove Springs until struck from the Navy List on 1 November 1959.

== Awards and honors ==
YMS-446 earned one battle star for her post-World War II minesweeping operations.
