= USC&GS Ranger =

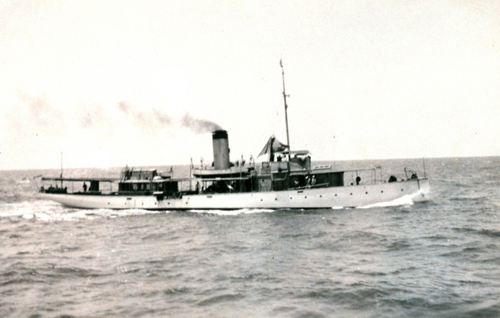
- USC&GS Ranger

History

United States
- Name: Ranger
- Namesake: Earlier civilian and U.S. Navy name reinstated
- Cost: $80,000 (USD) when constructed
- Completed: 1910
- Acquired: 28 April 1919
- Fate: Transferred to U.S. Navy 26 November 1930 or 31 January 1931.
- Notes: Operated as civilian yacht Thomas Slocum and Ranger 1910-1917 and U.S. Navy patrol vessel USS Ranger (SP-237) 1917-1918 and USS SP-237 1918-1919

General characteristics
- Type: Steamer
- Length: 145 ft (44 m)
- Beam: 7 ft (2.133600 m)
- Propulsion: Steam engine

USC&GS Ranger was a steamer that served in the United States Coast and Geodetic Survey from 1919 to 1930 or 1931.

Ranger was built as the civilian steam-driven, steel-hulled yacht Thomas Slocum in 1910 by the Robert Jacob Shipyard at City Island in the Bronx, New York. She later was renamed Ranger. From 1917 to 1919, she served in the United States Navy as patrol vessel USS Ranger (SP-237), being renamed USS SP-237 in 1918.

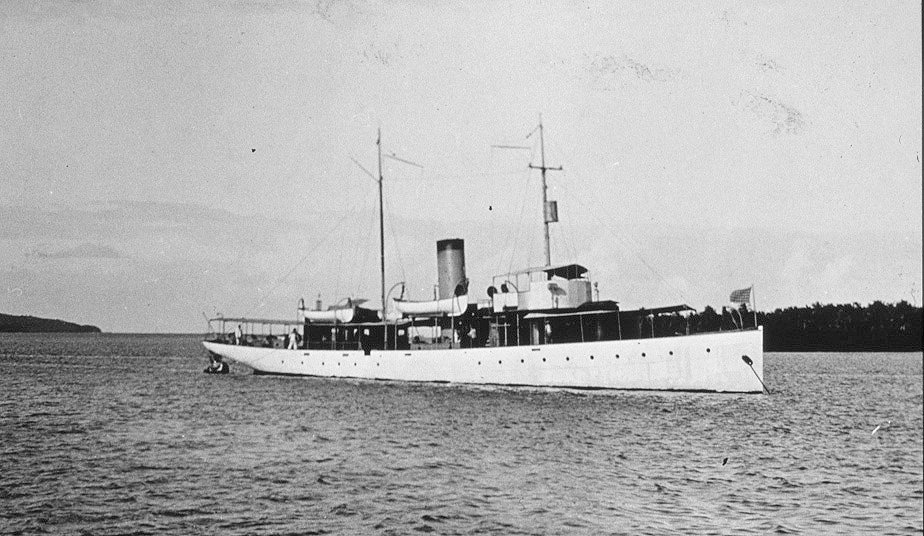
USC&GS Ranger at San Juan Puerto Rico, ca. 1921.

SP-237 was transferred to the Department of Commerce for use by the Coast and Geodetic Survey on 28 April 1919. Named USC&GS Ranger in Coast and Geodetic Survey service, she operated along the United States East Coast and in the Atlantic Ocean during her entire career with the Survey.

On 28 June 1922, Ranger joined the Coast and Geodetic Survey launch USC&GS Marindin in searching for survivors of the schooner Rose Standish, which had burned off Morro Point Light, Puerto Rico, although none were found. On 29 August 1924, she performed rescue work in the United States Virgin Islands—primarily by transporting rescue personnel to outlying islands from St. Thomas—after a hurricane passed through the area; she received a letter of thanks for her efforts from Philip Williams (1869–1942), the Governor of the U.S. Virgin Islands. On 28 February 1928, she assisted a gasoline launch on fire off Miami, Florida, putting out the fire so that the launch could be salvaged.

Ranger was transferred back to the Navy on either 26 November 1930 or 31 January 1931. The Navy sold her on 21 December 1931, and she was registered in Panama in 1932.
