= Overlakes Freight Corporation =

US Shipping Company

- Industry: transportation and shipping
- Founded: 1932 in New York City
- Defunct: 1962
- Fate: Sold off fleet of ships, Nicholson Terminal continues
- Key people: William M. Nicholson; William F. Deane; Walter S. Brown; Scott B. Worden

Overlakes Freight Corporation was shipping agent company founded in New York City on April 21, 1932, by William M. Nicholson. Overlakes Freight Corporation operated Liberty Ships during and for post World War II efforts. Most of Overlakes Freight Corporation ships were purchased by the War Shipping Administration for the war. Nicholson also owned the Nicholson Universal Steamship Company, Nicholson, Erie, Dover, Ferry Line, Nicholson Terminal & Dock Company, Aqua Terminal & Dock Corporation and the Nicholson Transit Company.

== William M. Nicholson ==
William M. Nicholson was born on July 2, 1864, in Canada. William M. Nicholson move to the United States in 1882. In 1885 Nicholson passed the US naturalization and became a US citizen. Nicholson became a marine engineer in Duluth, Minnesota. In 1901 married Elizabeth Ruth Quinton. Nicholson departed marine engineering and became the captain of the ship, SS Naomi in 1920. In 1923 Nicholson founded his first company the Nicholson Transit Company in Ecorse, Michigan, as a tugboat and barge firm in the New York State Canal System. Nicholson founded and built Nicholson's Universal Terminal Company in 1929. Nicholson's Universal Terminal Company operated out of a dock and warehouse at 5451 N. Marginal Road, Cleveland, Ohio. Nicholson's Universal Terminal Company opened a second dock and Warehouse in Encorse. Nicholson purchased two ships for his new Nicholson's Universal Terminal Company in Detroit, Michigan. In 1930 Nicholson purchased cargo ship SS Liberty 757-ton ship and also the SS Fellowcraft 1,640-ton cargo steamship. Nicholson started a new firm in 1931 the Nicholson, Erie, Dover, Ferry Line to operate the ship SS Keystone. SS Keystone was a 1,923-ton passenger liner with home ports in River Rouge, Michigan and Detroit. Overlakes Freight Corporation was a holding company for the Nicholson many firms and interests. In 1939 William F. Deane was president of the Aqua Terminal & Dock Corp. in Detroit. He lived with his wife Jean at 3703 Baldwin St. in Detroit. In 1939 Nicholson founded the Aqua Terminal & Dock Corporation with William F. Deane as president. Overlakes Freight Corporation purchased Nicholson Universal Steamship Company in 1942. Nicholson Universal Steamship Company had some car carrier ships, that were converted to cargo ships. Overlakes Freight Corporation became the operator of ships for the war effort. Nicholson Transit Company's eight Lakers cargo ships supported the war effort on the Great Lakes.

Nicholson Terminal & Dock Company
- Industry: transportation and shipping
- Founded: 1928 in Ecorse, Michigan
- Website: www.nicholson-terminal.com

== Nicholson Terminal and Dock Company ==
Nicholson Terminal & Dock Company was founded in 1928 and is in operation today as a general freight transporter. With offices in Ecorse, Michigan, Detroit, Michigan and River Rouge, Michigan. Nicholson Terminal & Dock Company operation at the Port of Detroit is a Foreign-Trade Zone (FTZ), with importing and exporting operations. Nicholson Terminal & Dock Company operates a dry dock and ship repair depot. Nicholson Terminal & Dock Company has partnerships with: Port of detroit, Wayne County Port Authority, Ambassador Port Company, Universal AM-CAN Ltd., Great American Lines Inc. and Distribution Publications Inc.

== Nicholson-Universal Steamship Company ==
SS Penobscot, laker built in 1895

Nicholson-Universal Steamship Company of Detroit, Michigan was founded in 1927 and sold in 1942.

- Ships:
- Penobscot, laker built in 1895 by F. W. Wheeler & Co., purchased in 1925, converted to automobile carrier, sold 1943 to US for war.
- SS Senator sank on Lake Michigan with the loss of nine lives and 268 Nash automobiles, on October 31, 1929, was rammed in fog by the bulk carrier Marquette.
- Pathfinder, a Whaleback steamship built in 1892, purchased in 1920, scrap in 1933.

== Nicholson Transit Company ==
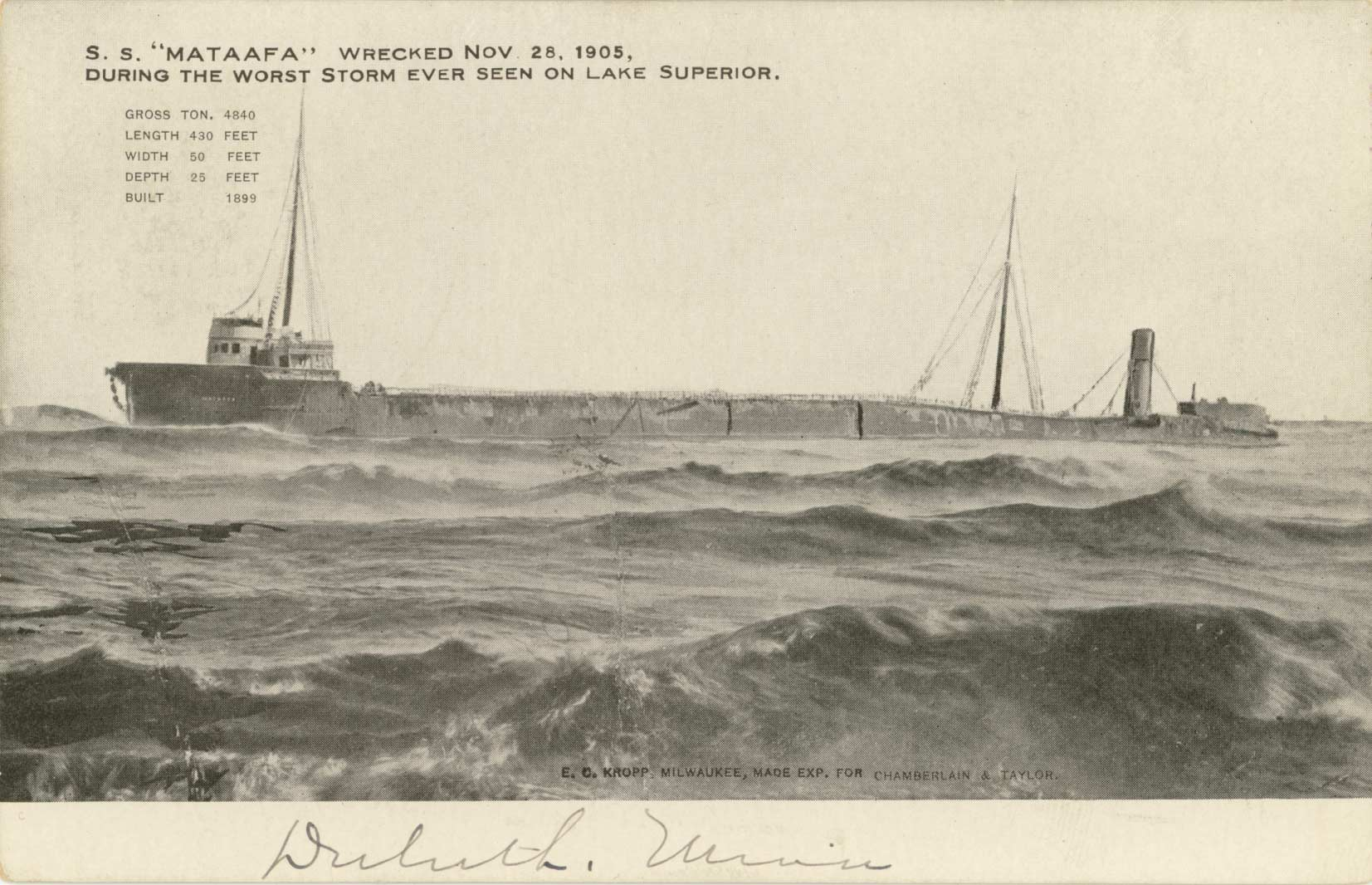
SS Mataafa

SS Adrian Iselin in 1914

Nicholson Transit Company of Ecorse, Michigan operated both ships and tugboat-barges on the Great Lakes starting in 1919. Some ships and tugs operated:

- Lake Traverse, was War Centaur built in 1917, was US Army and Navy ship in World War I purchased 1936, sold in 1943
  - Past Tuboats:
- F.J. Haynes, 1927 to 1941, built in 1895
- Humaconna
- Liberty
- Monarch, wooden tug was built in 1889 by Rieboldt & Wolter in Sheboygan, Wisconsin as the W.H. Simpson, purchased 1933, sank (overturned) on July 6, 1934, after a collision with C.F. Bielman off Point Edward, Ontario.
- Nicholson
- Car – Ore ship
- Roumania, Wooden Great Lakes bulk freighter, built in 1887 at West Bay City MI by James Davidson, scrapped in 1929, Nicholson first's ship in 1889.
- SS Mataafa, converted ore carrier to an automobile carrier in 1946
- Fleetwood, built in 1903, by Bethlehem Steel, taken for war in 1942.
  - World War 2 operator for War Shipping Administration :
- Adrian Iselin, built in 1914 by Detroit Shipbuilding, to Nicholson Transit in 1940 and on June 8, 1943, as war charter ship. Sold in 1961, Sunk as a breakwater at Kewaunee Power Station plant in 1967.

== Nicholson Erie-Dover Ferry Line ==
Nicholson Erie-Dover Ferry Line, Ferry Erie

Nicholson founded the Nicholson Erie-Dover Ferry Line in 1926. The Nicholson Erie-Dover Ferry Line operated an automobile and passenger ferry service from Erie, Pennsylvania to Port Dover in Ontario, Canada. Nicholson Erie-Dover Ferry Line operated three ferries the: Erie, Dover and Keystone. The ferry Keystone had a max capacity of 80 cars and 1,000 passengers. In 1929 both the Erie and Dover caught on fire and were destroyed. The Nicholson Erie-Dover Ferry Line ended in 1931 due to the Great Depression.

- Ferry:
- Erie, built as Pennsylvania for the Erie & Buffalo line. Was renamed Owana in 1903, sold in 1925 to Nicholson, built in 1899 at Wyandotte MI, hull converted to a coal barge in 1934, scrapped until 1981, 200.6 by 39 feet, 747 tons
- Dover, was Frank E Kirby from 1890 to 1919, built in 1890 at Wyandotte MI, 195.5 x 30.1 feet, 532 tons, used on Sandusky route until 1919, renamed Silver Spray working the Detroit-Kingsville Line, Renamed Dover by Nicholson, destroyed by fire in 1932.
- Keystone, was City of Cleveland from 1886 to 1925, renamed City of St. Ignace in 1907, Built at Wyandotte MI, 1,923 tons, in 1927 sold to Western Reserve Navigation Co, renamed Keystone when sold to Nicholson in 1929. Burned on June 23, 1932, scrapped in 1948

== World War II ==
Overlakes Freight Corporation's fleet of ships were used to help the World War II effort. During World War II Overlakes Freight Corporation operated Merchant navy ships for the United States Shipping Board. During World War II Overlakes Freight Corporation was active with charter shipping with the Maritime Commission and War Shipping Administration. Overlakes Freight Corporation operated Liberty ships for the merchant navy. The ship was run by its Overlakes Freight Corporation crew and the US Navy supplied United States Navy Armed Guards to man the deck guns and radio.

== Overlakes Freight Corporation Ships ==
Overlakes Freight Corporation Ships World War II and post war operated ships:

Liberty ship of World War II

  - Liberty Ships:
- Vernon S. Hood 1945 to 1947
- SS Coastal Archer 1946
- SS Henry S. Sanford 1944 to 1946
- SS Grover C. Hutcherson 1944 to 1948
- Sherwood Anderson 1946 post war work
- George A. Marr
- Frederic E. Ives
- Russell R. Jones
- Bernard L. Rodman
- Josiah Cohen
- Charles J. Finger

== See also ==
- World War II United States Merchant Navy
