= USS PC-457 =

US Navy former Submarine Chaser

History

United States
- Name: USS PC-457
- Builder: Robert Jacob Shipyard, City Island, New York
- Launched: 1939
- Acquired: 1940
- Commissioned: 1941
- Fate: Sunk in collision, 14 August 1941

General characteristics
- Type: Submarine chaser
- Displacement: 125 long tons (127 t)
- Length: 106 ft 9 in (32.54 m)
- Beam: 23 ft (7.0 m)
- Propulsion: Supercharged diesel engines, two shafts

USS PC-457 was a submarine chaser of the United States Navy before World War II.

PC-457 was built in 1939 as the yacht Trouper by Robert Jacob Shipyard of City Island, New York for C. A. Tilt of Chicago, IL, the president of the Diamond T Motor Company.

She was acquired by the US Navy in 1940 due to the Navy's rapidly rising demand for patrol craft as the war in Europe expanded. She was commissioned in 1941.

On 14 August 1941 she was sunk in a collision near San Juan, Puerto Rico with freighter Norluna (United States). "Official Chronology of the US Navy in WWII". Ibiblio.
