= USS Impetuous =

United States Navy patrol boat

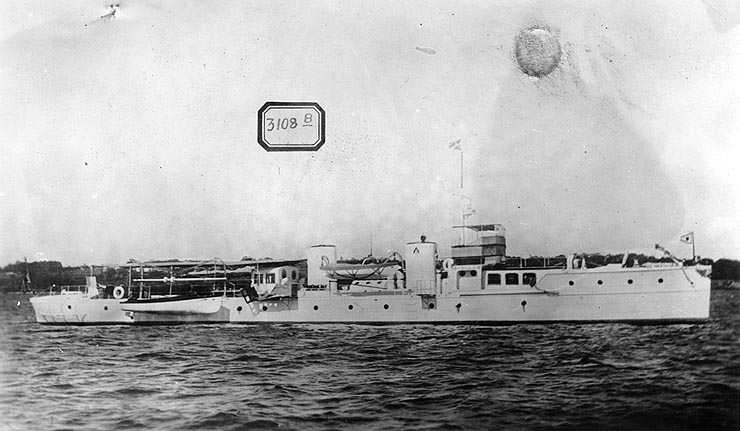

History

United States
- Name: Paragon (1915—1916) (Note: Not to be confused with the larger Paragon (1929) also built for Charles J. Davol that became Paragon (PYc-36) during WW II.); Sybilla III (1916—1935); Arlis (1935—1940)
- Owner: Charles J. Davol (1915—1916); John F. Betz, 3d (1916—1935); R. Livingston Sullivan (1935—1940)
- Builder: Robert Jacob Shipyard, City Island, New York City
- Launched: 1915
- Acquired: 14 May 1917 (free lease)
- Commissioned: 14 May 1917
- Decommissioned: 1918
- Stricken: 24 December 1918
- Identification: U.S. Official Number: 213128; Signal: LFJB (1915—1932); KNMU (1932—1940)
- Notes: Paragon first registered week ending 24 April 1915.

General characteristics
- Tonnage: 103 GRT, 70 NRT
- Length: 120 ft (37 m) LOA; 118 ft 6 in (36.1 m) Waterline; 115.1 ft (35.1 m) Registry
- Beam: 14 ft 6 in (4.42 m)
- Draft: 4 ft 8 in (1.42 m)
- Propulsion: 2 X Winton 6 cyl. gasoline engines, two shafts; Converted to diesel 1932—1933
- Speed: 15 knots (28 km/h; 17 mph)
- Range: 500 nmi (580 mi; 930 km) at 14 kn (16 mph; 26 km/h)
- Complement: 9
- Armament: 1 × QF 3-pounder Hotchkiss; 1 × 1-pounder gun; 1 × machine gun
- Notes: Steel, 2 funnels, 1 mast, 2 X 5 kw Winton generator sets, .5 kw wireless

History
- Name: PC-454
- Acquired: 12 August 1940
- Commissioned: 16 October 1940
- Decommissioned: 27 September 1944
- Renamed: Impetuous, 15 July 1943
- Reclassified: PYc-46, 15 July 1943 (Note: The on line DANFS has the erroneous "PYc-16" classification. The print DANFS and other references have "PYc-46" as the designation.)
- Stricken: 14 October 1944
- Fate: Sold, 14 June 1945
- Notes: Purchased by Navy from R. Livingston Sullivan for $70,000.

General characteristics
- Displacement: 140 long tons (142 t)
- Length: 121 ft (37 m)
- Beam: 14 ft 5 in (4.39 m)
- Draft: 6 ft (1.8 m)
- Speed: 16 knots (30 km/h; 18 mph)
- Armament: 6 × .30 caliber machine guns

USS Impetuous (PYc-46) was a private yacht purchased by the Navy in August 1940 that served as a patrol boat of the United States Navy in Central America. The yacht was built as Paragon, the first of at least two Davol yachts to bear the name, in 1915 for Charles J. Davol of Providence, Rhode Island. In 1916 Davol sold the yacht to John Fred Betz, 3d of Philadelphia who renamed the yacht Sybilla III which served as the Section Patrol yacht USS Sybilla III (SP-104) from May 1917 to December 1918. Sybilla III remained in Betz's ownership until sale in 1935 to R. Livingston Sullivan of Philadelphia who renamed the yacht Arlis. On 12 August 1940 the Navy purchased the yacht placing it in commission as USS PC-454 on 16 October. The vessel was given the name Impetuous and reclassified PYc-46 on 15 July 1943. The yacht was decommissioned at Philadelphia 31 August 1944 and transferred to the War Shipping Administration for sale.

== Yacht Paragon ==
Paragon was built for Charles J. Davol of Providence, Rhode Island in 1915 by Robert Jacob Shipyard, City Island, New York City. The yacht was designed by Swasey, Raymond & Page, Boston, somewhat along the lines of the U.S. Navy torpedo destroyers. (Note: Davol's initials are seen as "J. J.", "C. A." and "C. J." in some references but is spelled out as Charles J. in others. A particularly interesting one is found in Power Boating (December 1916) regarding Fred Betz owner of the smaller yacht, Sybilla II purchasing Paragon from Charles J. Davol.) Davol was president and treasurer of the Davol Rubber Company. He maintained moorings for his yachts near his 1,000 acres (404.7 ha) North Kingstown, Rhode Island estate "Wildacres" which composed most of Quonset Point. He was a member of seven yacht clubs. (Note: Paragon (1929) Bath Iron Works, 140 ft 1.o.a., became Paragon (PYc-36). Davol died in 1937 and the estate and yachts were sold.)

The yacht had two 200 horsepower six cylinder gasoline engines with 9 in (22.9 cm) bore and 14 in (35.6 cm) stroke. In keeping with its naval look there was a polished and enameled functional quick firing gun mounted aft. Paragon was registered "during the week ending April 24, 1915" as a gas powered yacht at Providence, R. I. with U.S. Official Number 213128, signal LFJB, 103 GRT, 70 NRT, registry length of 115.1 ft (35.1 m), 14.2 ft (4.3 m) beam and depth of 8.2 ft (2.5 m). Additional dimensions are listed in Lloyd's Register of American Yachts 1917 for the yacht after sale and rename as length overall 120 ft (36.6 m), length on waterline 118 ft 6 in (36.1 m), extreme breadth 14 ft 4 in (4.4 m), depth 8 ft 3 in (2.5 m) and draft of 5 ft (1.5 m).

== Yacht Sybilla III ==
By December 1916 (Note: Possibly 6 November 1916 as Ships Documents of Rhode Island shows a yacht Paragon owned by Charles J. Davol with similar specifications surrendering Rhode Island documents on that date.) the yacht had been sold to John Fred Betz, 3d who owned a slightly smaller, 100 ft (30.5 m), yacht named Sybilla II. Paragon was renamed by Betz Sybilla III registered in Philadelphia. (Note: Betz, one of the family owners of John F. Betz & Sons Brewery, was also owner of Sybilla II acquired by the Navy under free lease on 24 May 1917 to be commissioned as Tacony (SP-5).) The sale had been negotiated by the naval architectural firm Gielow & Orr during a period in which the government was buying yachts for potential wartime use and gentlemen yachtsmen were buying suitable yachts to enroll in the Naval Coast Defense Reserve or turn yachts over to the Naval Coast Patrol on the "free rental" of $1 per month.

Sybilla III was acquired 14 May 1917 under free lease from Betz and commissioned the same day as USS Sybilla III (SP-104) for service in the Section Patrol. The yacht served in the Fourth Naval District for a rental of $1 per month plus cost of restoration after use. On 24 December 1918 the yacht was returned to Betz and name struck from the Naval Vessel Register (NVR).

In the 1932-33 register Sybilla III is shown with a new signal, KNMU, and diesel engines. In the 1935-36 register the vessel is shown as Arlis owned by R. Livingston Sullivan of Philadelphia.

== USS Impetuous (PYc-46) ==
The Navy acquired Arlis from Sullivan for $70,000 on 12 August 1940, converted the yacht at a cost of $50,000 and commissioned the vessel USS PC-454 on 16 October with assignment to the 15th Naval District. PC-454 arrived in the Canal Zone in mid-November 1940 to patrol the approaches to the Panama Canal. From November 1940 to August 1944 she performed escort and antisubmarine patrol operations off Central America. The patrol vessel was named and reclassified Impetuous (PYc-46) on 15 July 1943. On 31 August 1944, the patrol yacht arrived in Philadelphia and was decommissioned there on 27 September, struck from the Naval Register on 14 October and sold by the War Shipping Administration on 14 June 1945.
