= West India Steamship Company =

Former US Shipping Company

- Industry: Passenger, transportation and shipping
- Founded: 1910 in New York City
- Key people: Edward R. Bacon; Daniel Bacon; Robert Bacon; R M Goddard, President in 1919

West India Steamship Company was a passenger and cargo steamship company founded in New York City in 1910. West India Steamship Company was founded by Edward R. Bacon, Robert Bacon and Daniel Bacon. Edward R. Bacon was an attorney and Daniel Bacon was a ship broker. Before founding West India Steamship Company all three had worked for the Barnes Steamship Company. They operated the West India Steamship Line. By 1913, West India Steamship Company had cargo routes from New York City and Norfolk, Virginia to Cuba, Mexico, Colón, Panama, and the Windward Islands. By 1921 West India Steamship Company added routes from Mobile, Alabama, to a number of West Indies ports. West India Steamship Company was active in supporting the World War II efforts.

== World War II ==
West India Steamship Company fleet of ships that were used to help the World War II effort. During World War II West India Steamship Company operated Merchant navy ships for the United States Shipping Board. During World War II West India Steamship Company was active with charter shipping with the Maritime Commission and War Shipping Administration. West India Steamship Company operated Liberty ships and Victory ships for the merchant navy. The ship was run by its West India Steamship Company crew and the US Navy supplied United States Navy Armed Guards to man the deck guns and radio.

== Ships ==
Ships owned:

- Tymouth Castle
- Duart Castle
- USS Resolute (SP-3218) 1920 to 1926
- SS Polar Land built in 1918, sank in 1919 off Sable Island
- SS Lake Frampton

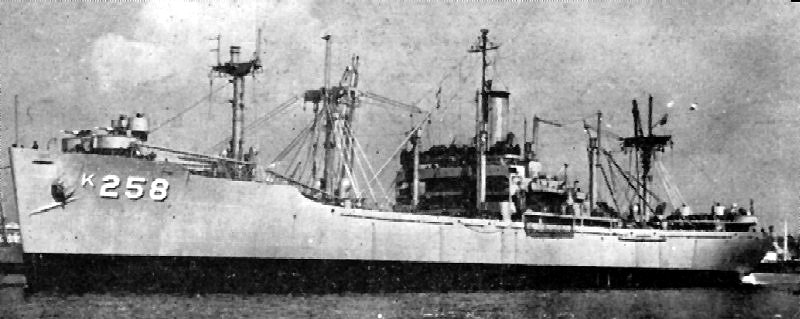
A Victory ship of World War II

Liberty ship of World War II

  - World War II operated:
  - Liberty Ships:
- George A. Lawson
- Martin Van Buren on Jan. 14, 1945 was torpedoed and damaged by German submarine U-1232 off Halifax, Nova Scotia was beached and later scrapped in situ.
- Edward R. Squibb
- Willard R. Johnsonhttp://www.mariners-l.co.uk/LibShipsW.html
- Willard R. Johnson
- SS Frederick Bartholdi on Dec. 25, 1943 ran ashore on Isle of Skye, later was refloated and towed to the Clyde and scrapped.
  - Other ships:
- New Rochelle Victory
- USS Lebanon (AK-191) in 1945, a C1-M-AV1 cargo ship.

== See also ==
- World War II United States Merchant Navy
