= Robert Jacob Shipyard =

Marine service provider and shipbuilder in New York

Coordinates: 40.841750°N 73.782556°W

- Industry: Shipbuilding; Marine repair
- Founded: January 1900; 126 years ago
- Founder: Robert Jacob
- Defunct: 1946
- Fate: Sold
- Successor: Consolidated Shipbuilding
- Headquarters: City Island, Bronx, NY, USA
- Area served: US Navy and New York
- Products: PT Boats, Tugboat, Minesweepers, Submarine chasers, yachts
- Services: Boat building and repair

Robert Jacob Shipyard founded by Robert Jacob in 1900 on City Island, Bronx, New York. During World War II Robert Jacob Shipyard built PT boats and Tugboat for the United States Navy. During World War I Robert Jacob Shipyard built Submarine chaser boats. When not building war boats, the shipyard built yachts, schooners and sloops. After the war, in 1946, Robert Jacob Shipyard was sold to Consolidated Shipbuilding of Morris Heights. Later Consolidated moved to the City Island shipyard. In 1958, Consolidated closed and sold to Wesley Rodstrom run as a yacht repair yard.

== Boats ==
  - World War I:
- SC-313 to SC-317 Submarine chaser for World War I
- YT 66 to YT 70 YT-46-class harbor tugboat
  - World War II:
- YTL-154 to YTL-212 Tugboats
- YT 236 to YT 246 Tugboat 66 feet
- YMS 38 to YMS 41 Minesweepers
- YMS 207 to YMS 362 Minesweepers
- YMS 438 to YMS 441 Minesweepers
- BPT-37 to BPT 42 PT boats
- PCS 1388 to PCS 1396 Submarine chasers
- PT 385 to PT 399 PT boats 70 feet
- YT 438 to YTL 603 Tugboat 66 feet

Some boats built:

- USS Ranger World War I
- USS Aramis
- USS Resolute (SP-3003)
- USS Impetuous
- HMCS Otter
- USC&GS Ranger
- USS PC-457 World War II
- USS Hawk (AMS-17) Minesweeper World War II
- USS Sanderling (AMCU-49)
- USS Pelican (AMS-32)

== Gallery ==
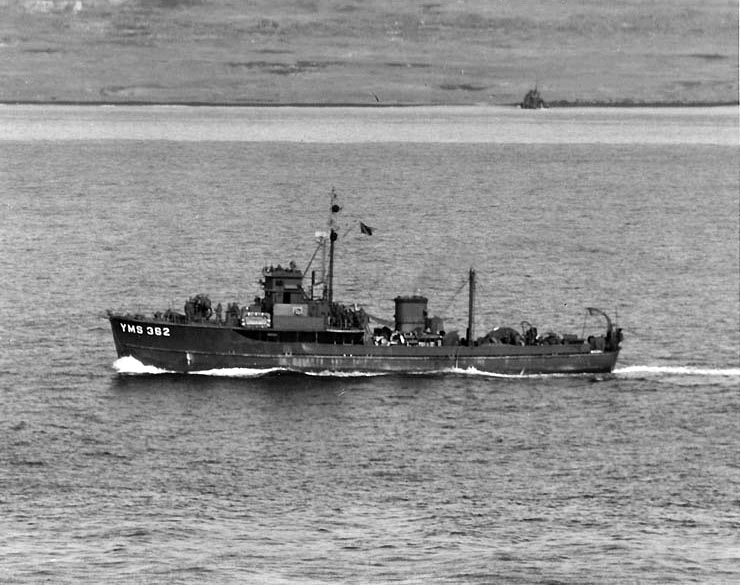
YMS-362 built by Robert Jacob Shipyard

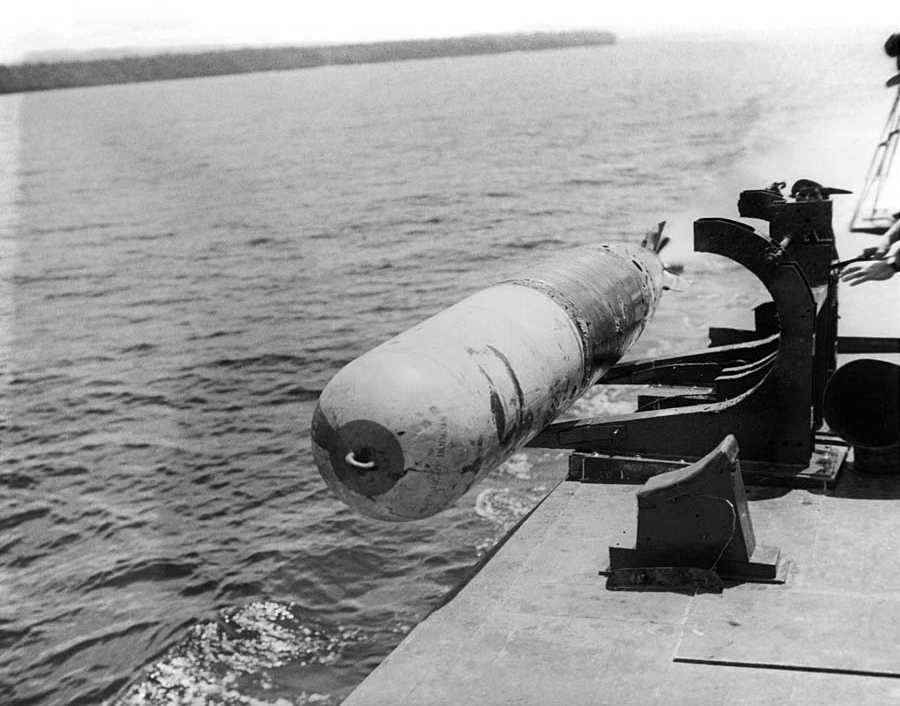
Mk 13 torpedo launch from PT boat in 1943

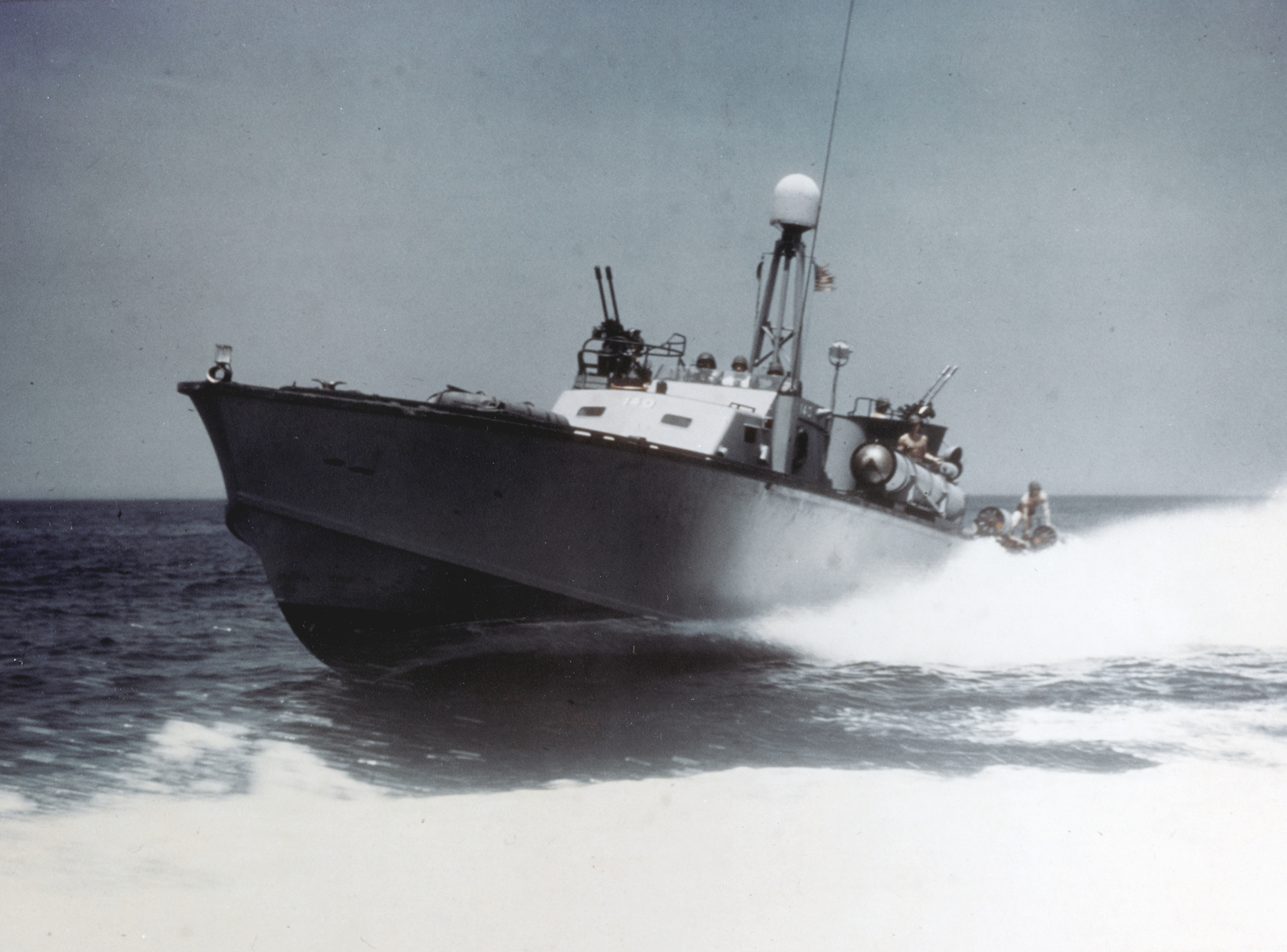
PT boat in 1943

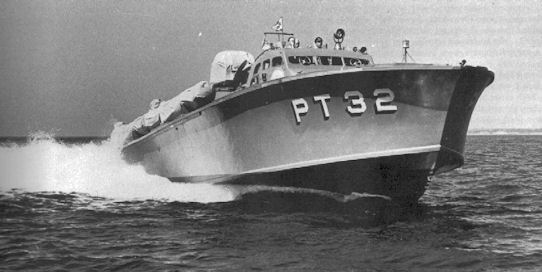
PT Boat

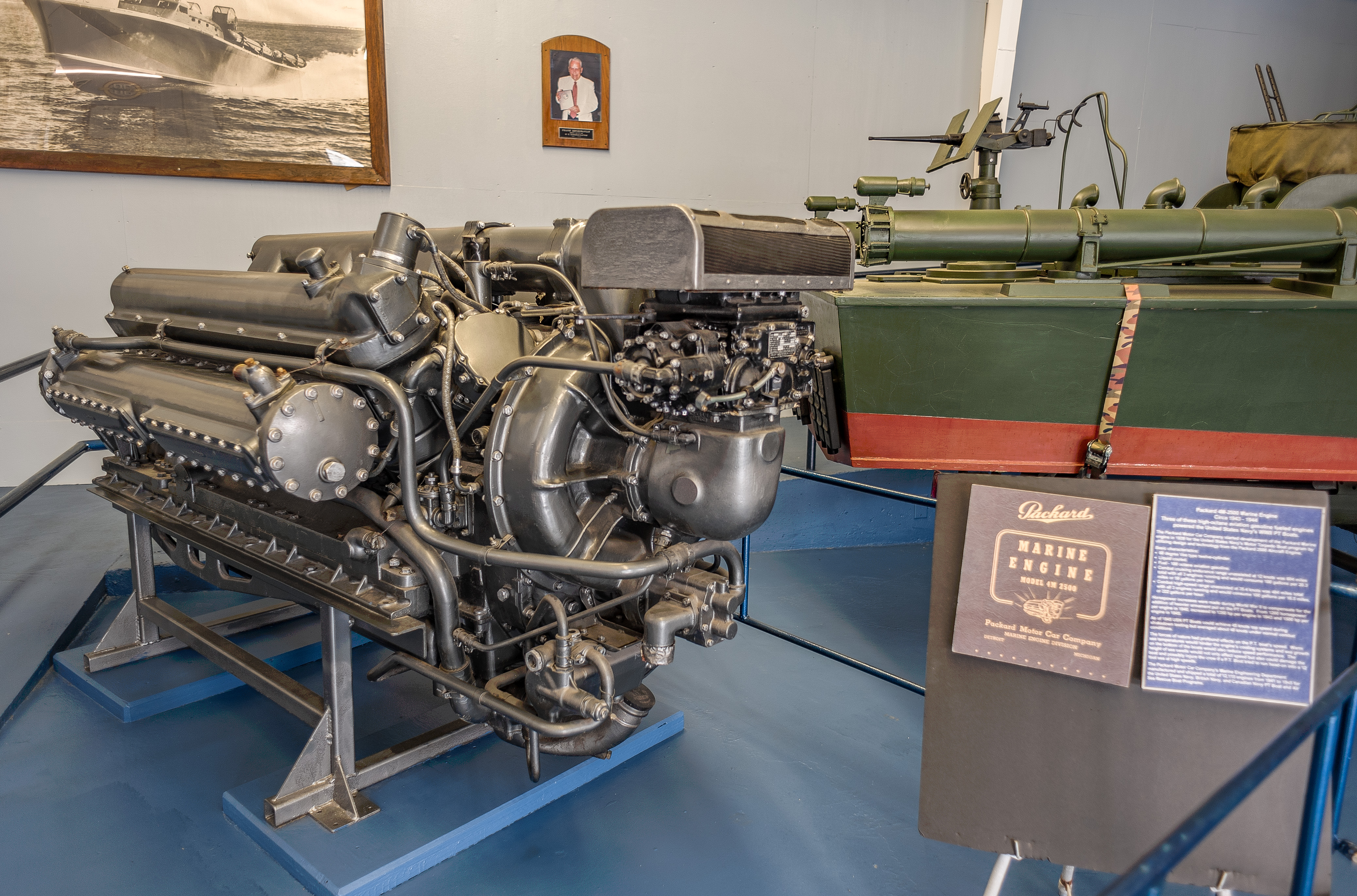
Packard Marine Engine M4 2500 at Battleship Cove in Falls River, Massachusetts use in PT boats
