= USS Hawk (AMS-17) =

Minesweeper of the United States Navy

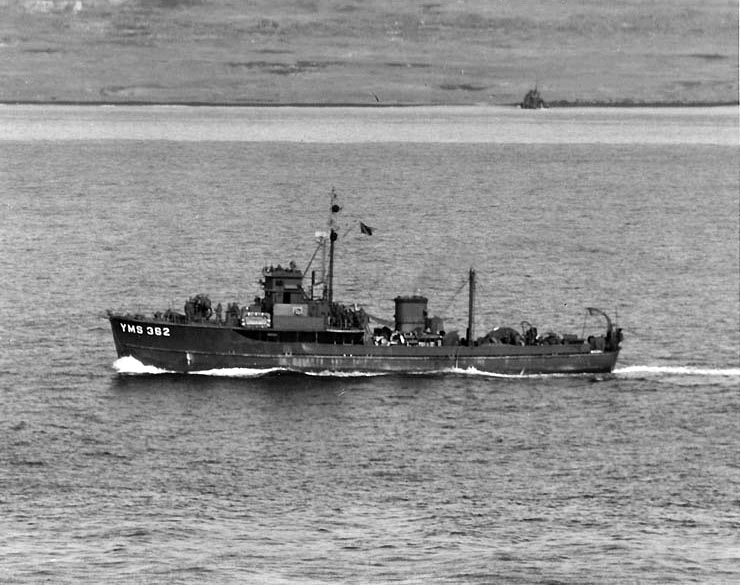
- USS YMS-362 off Iwo Jima in February 1945. The ship later was renamed and redesignated USS Hawk (AMS-17).

History

United States
- Name: USS YMS-362
- Builder: Robert Jacob Inc.; City Island, New York
- Laid down: 24 November 1942
- Launched: 22 May 1943
- Sponsored by: Miss Marilyn Miller
- Completed: 30 September 1943
- Commissioned: 4 October 1943
- Renamed: USS Hawk (AMS-17), 17 February 1947
- Namesake: the hawk bird
- Reclassified: MSC(O)-17, 7 February 1955
- Stricken: 17 October 1957
- Honors and awards: 4 battle stars, World War II
- Fate: Sold; ultimate fate unknown

General characteristics
- Class & type: YMS-135 subclass of YMS-1-class minesweepers
- Displacement: 245 t.
- Length: 136 ft (41 m)
- Beam: 22 ft 9 in (6.93 m)
- Draft: 6 ft 3 in (1.91 m)
- Propulsion: 2 × 880 bhp General Motors 8-268A diesel engines; Snow and Knobstedt single reduction gear; 2 shafts
- Speed: 14.5 knots (26.9 km/h)
- Complement: 50
- Armament: 1 × 3"/50 caliber gun mount

USS Hawk (MSC(O)-17/AMS-17/YMS-362) was a YMS-1-class minesweeper of the YMS-135 subclass built for the United States Navy during World War II.

Hawk was laid down as YMS-362 on 24 November 1942 by Robert Jacob Inc. of City Island, New York, launched, 22 May 1943, sponsored by Miss Marilyn Miller. The ship was completed on 30 September 1943, and commissioned on 4 October 1943.

YMS-362 spent its first year of commissioned life in training on the eastern coast of the United States.

She departed Norfolk, Virginia, and the Atlantic Fleet 19 October 1944, and arrived at Pearl Harbor 25 November for war duty. She swept mines in support of the invasion of Iwo Jima 17 February 1945, destroying two enemy machine gun emplacements ashore as the invasion began.

YMS-362 witnessed the mushroom cloud resulting from the atomic bombing of Hiroshima on 6 August 1945 and was present in Tokyo Bay at the signing of the Japanese Instrument of Surrender on 2 September 1945.

Her minesweeping patrols continued around the Japanese home islands until 28 December, when YMS-362 began passage for her return to Charleston, South Carolina, arriving in late May 1946.

After overhaul and refitting, she took up duties with the Atlantic Fleet as a unit attached to the U.S. Naval Mine-craft Base at Charleston, South Carolina. During a second refitting, on 17 February 1947 YMS-362 was renamed and redesignated Hawk (AMS-17). Reclassified a second time as MSC(O)-17 on 7 February 1955, Hawk continued her service as a minesweeping training ship.

Hawk was struck from the Naval Vessel Register 17 October 1957 and sold. Her ultimate fate is unknown.

== Awards and honors ==
Hawk received four battle stars for her service in World War II.
