= USS Lebanon (AK-191) =

Cargo ship of the United States Navy

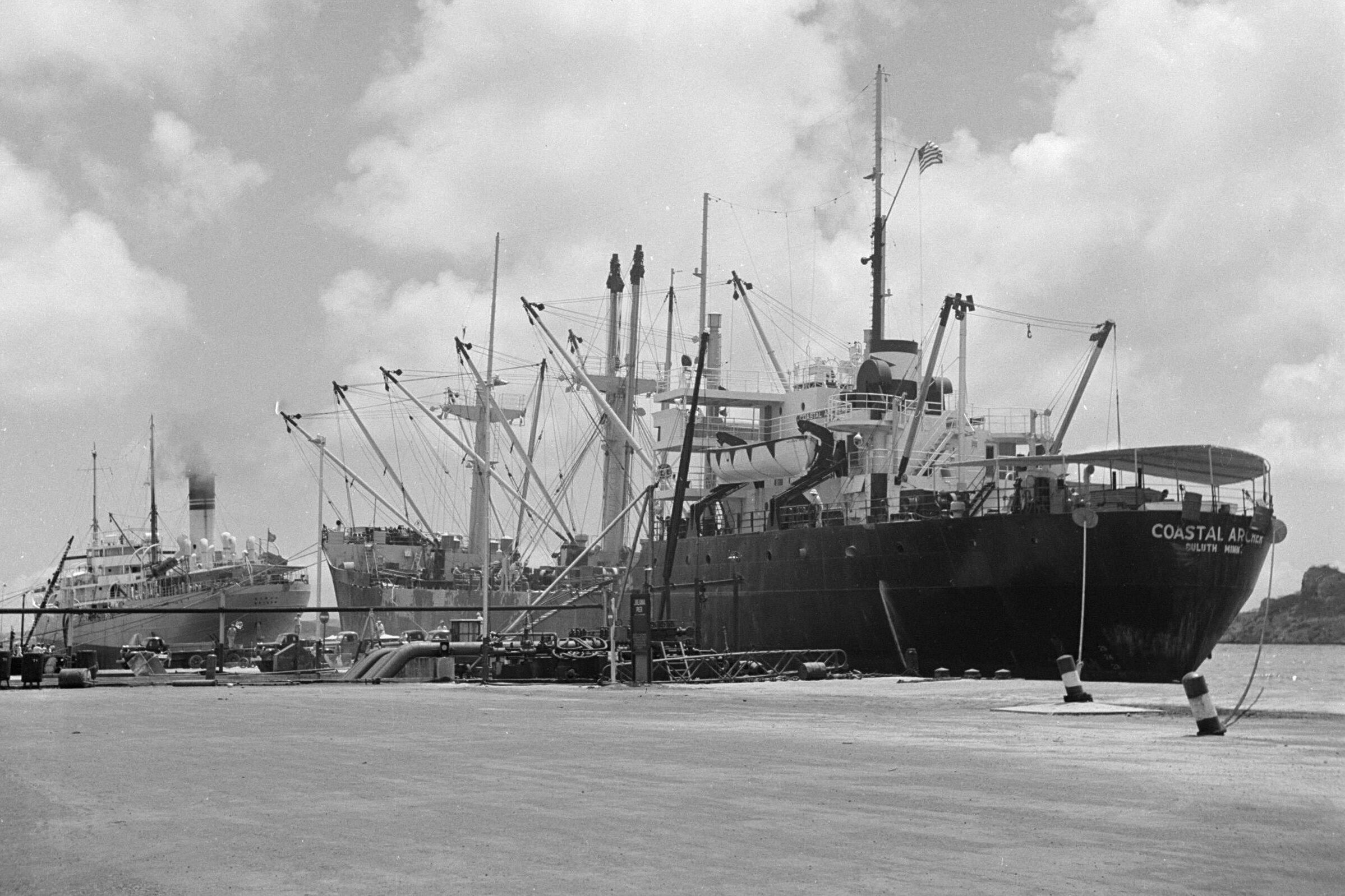
- Coastal Archer in Curaçao, 1947

History

United States
- Name: Coastal Archer (1944–1945); Lebanon (1945)
- Namesake: Lebanon County, Pennsylvania
- Ordered: as type (C1-M-AV1) hull, MC hull 2122
- Builder: Walter Butler Shipbuilding, Superior, Wisconsin
- Yard number: 40
- Laid down: 15 May 1944
- Launched: 14 October 1944
- Acquired: 25 August 1945
- Commissioned: 26 September 1945
- Decommissioned: 15 November 1945
- Identification: Hull symbol: AK-191; Code letters: NEOA; IMO number: 5296329
- Fate: returned to Maritime Commission, 15 November 1945

History

United States
- Name: Coastal Archer
- Owner: Maritime Commission
- Operator: West India SS Company (1945); Overlakes Freight Corp. (1946); Lykes Bros. SS Company, Inc. (1946–1947); Waterman SS Corp. (1948)
- Acquired: 15 November 1945
- In service: 25 November 1945
- Out of service: 25 June 1948
- Fate: Sold, 13 July 1956

History

Brazil
- Name: Rio Paraguaçu
- Owner: Companhia de Navegação Lloyd Brasileiro
- Acquired: 13 July 1956
- In service: 22 August 1956
- Fate: Sold, 1976

History

Colombia
- Name: Irazu
- Owner: Lineas Agromar Ltda.
- Acquired: 1976
- Fate: Scrapped, 2 September 1986

General characteristics
- Class & type: Alamosa-class cargo ship
- Type: C1-M-AV1
- Tonnage: 5,032 long tons deadweight (DWT)
- Displacement: 2,382 long tons (2,420 t) (standard); 7,450 long tons (7,570 t) (full load)
- Length: 388 ft 8 in (118.47 m)
- Beam: 50 ft (15 m)
- Draft: 21 ft 1 in (6.43 m)
- Installed power: 1 × Nordberg, TSM 6 diesel engine; 1,750 shp (1,300 kW)
- Propulsion: 1 × propeller
- Speed: 11.5 kn (21.3 km/h; 13.2 mph)
- Capacity: 3,945 t (3,883 long tons) DWT; 9,830 cu ft (278 m^{3}) (refrigerated); 227,730 cu ft (6,449 m^{3}) (non-refrigerated)
- Complement: 15 Officers; 70 Enlisted
- Armament: 1 × 3 in (76 mm)/50 caliber dual purpose gun (DP); 6 × 20 mm (0.8 in) Oerlikon anti-aircraft (AA) cannons

USS Lebanon (AK-191) was an Alamosa-class cargo ship constructed for the US Navy during the end of World War II. As the war ended, fewer cargo ships were needed and the Lebanon was sold into commercial service.

== Construction ==
Lebanon was the second U.S. Navy ship to bear that name. She was laid down under a Maritime Commission contract, MC hull 2122, by Walter Butler Shipbuilding Co. out of Superior, Wisconsin, on 15 May 1944. She was launched on 14 October 1944 and was sponsored by Mrs. Charles E. Denny. The Lebanon was acquired by the Navy on 25 August 1945, and commissioned at New Orleans, Louisiana, on 26 September 1945.

== Service history ==
=== World War II-related service ===
The end of World War II reduced the need for cargo ships. Lebanon was decommissioned on the 15 of November, 1946. She was returned to the Maritime Commission the same day, and was chartered to Lykes Brothers Steamship Company, Inc., which renamed her Coastal Archer.

== Merchant service ==
The Lebanon, renamed Coastal Archer, was used by several shipping companies from 1945 to 1948. She was then placed in the reserve fleet.

On 13 July 1956, she was sold to Brazil under the condition that she be used for coastal shipping by Brazil. She was delivered on 22 August 1956 and renamed Rio Paraguaçu. In 1976 the ship was sold to Colombian shipowner Lineas Agromar and renamed Irazu. At first she sailed under Colombian flag; later, this was transferred to Panama. The Irazu traded for another 10 years before finally being sold for scrap in Colombia. On 2 September 1986 she arrived at Mamonal for demolition.

== Notes ==
Citations

== Bibliography ==
Online resources

- "Lebanon II (AK-191)". Dictionary of American Naval Fighting Ships. Naval History and Heritage Command. 29 July 2016. This article incorporates text from this source, which is in the public domain.
- "C1 Cargo Ships". www.ShipbuildingHistory.com. 28 August 2009.
- "USS Lebanon (AK-191)". NavSource. 8 November 2013.
- "Coastal Archer". United States Department of Transportation. Archived from the original on November 4, 2016.
