= USS Watchman =

Guardian-class radar picket ship

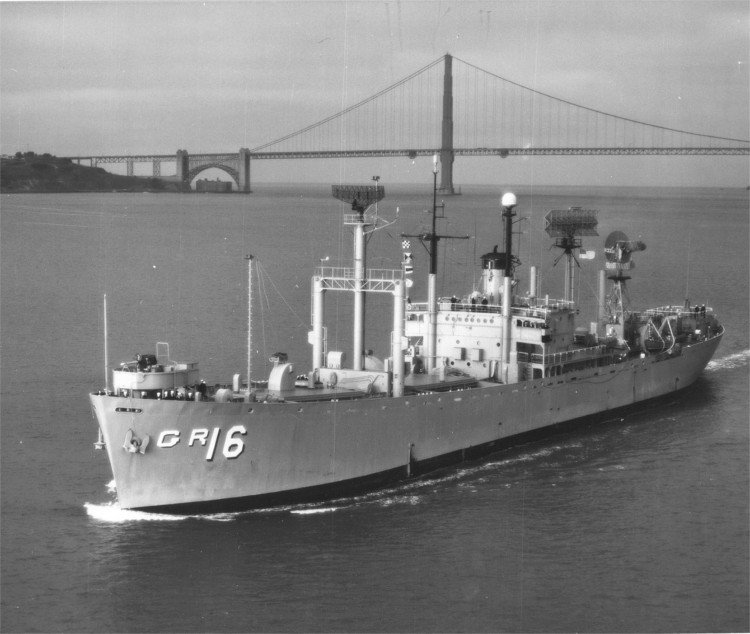
- USS Watchman (AGR-16) entering San Francisco Bay

History

United States
- Name: Vernon S. Hood
- Namesake: Vernon S. Hood
- Owner: War Shipping Administration (WSA)
- Operator: Overlakes Freight Co.
- Ordered: as type (EC2-S-C5) hull, MC hull 2343
- Builder: J.A. Jones Construction, Panama City, Florida
- Cost: $1,061,814
- Yard number: 84
- Way number: 6
- Laid down: 17 January 1945
- Launched: 20 February 1945
- Sponsored by: Mrs. Inez Bulifant
- Completed: 7 March 1945
- Identification: Call sign: ANPR
- Fate: Placed in the, National Defense Reserve Fleet, James River Reserve Fleet, Lee Hall, Virginia, 1947; Acquired by US Navy, 1958

United States
- Name: Watchman
- Namesake: One who watches
- Commissioned: 5 January 1959
- Decommissioned: 7 July 1965
- Reclassified: Guardian-class radar picket ship
- Refit: Charleston Naval Shipyard, Charleston, South Carolina
- Stricken: 1 September 1965
- Identification: Hull symbol: AGR-16; Call sign: NZVD
- Fate: Placed in the, National Defense Reserve Fleet, Suisun Bay Reserve Fleet, Suisun Bay, California, 1 September 1965; Sold for scrapping, 3 October 1974

General characteristics
- Class & type: Liberty ship; type EC2-S-C5, boxed aircraft transport
- Tonnage: 10,600 LT DWT; 7,200 GRT
- Displacement: 3,380 long tons (3,434 t) (light); 14,245 long tons (14,474 t) (max)
- Length: 441 feet 6 inches (135 m) oa; 416 feet (127 m) pp; 427 feet (130 m) lwl
- Beam: 57 feet (17 m)
- Draft: 27 ft 9.25 in (8.4646 m)
- Installed power: 2 × Oil fired 450 °F (232 °C) boilers, operating at 220 psi (1,500 kPa); 2,500 hp (1,900 kW)
- Propulsion: 1 × triple-expansion steam engine, (manufactured by Joshua Hendy Iron Works, Sunnyvale, California); 1 × screw propeller
- Speed: 11.5 knots (21.3 km/h; 13.2 mph)
- Capacity: 490,000 cubic feet (13,875 m^{3}) (bale)
- Complement: 38–62 USMM; 21–40 USNAG
- Armament: Varied by ship; Bow-mounted 3-inch (76 mm)/50-caliber gun; Stern-mounted 4-inch (102 mm)/50-caliber gun; 2–8 × single 20-millimeter (0.79 in) Oerlikon anti-aircraft (AA) cannons and/or, 2–8 × 37-millimeter (1.46 in) M1 AA guns

General characteristics (US Navy refit)
- Class & type: Guardian-class radar picket ship
- Capacity: 443,646 US gallons (1,679,383 L; 369,413 imp gal) (fuel oil); 68,267 US gallons (258,419 L; 56,844 imp gal) (diesel); 15,082 US gallons (57,092 L; 12,558 imp gal) (fresh water); 1,326,657 US gallons (5,021,943 L; 1,104,673 imp gal) (fresh water ballast)
- Complement: 13 officers; 138 enlisted
- Armament: 2 × 3 inches (76 mm)/50 caliber guns

USS Watchman (AGR-16) was a Guardian-class radar picket ship, converted from a Liberty Ship, acquired by the US Navy in 1958. She was reconfigured as a radar picket ship and assigned to radar picket duty in the North Pacific Ocean as part of the Distant Early Warning Line.

== Construction ==
Watchman (YAGR-16) was laid down on 17 January 1945, under a Maritime Commission (MARCOM) contract, MC hull 2343, as the Liberty Ship Vernon S. Hood, by J.A. Jones Construction, Panama City, Florida. She was launched 20 February 1945; sponsored by Mrs. Inez Bulifant; and delivered 7 March 1945, to MARCOM.

== Service history ==
=== Merchant service ===
Following a shakedown cruise in the Gulf of Mexico, the freighter was turned over to the Overlakes Freight Corporation, to be operated by that firm under a contract with the MARCOM. During her brief period of active operations with MARCOM, 1945 to 1947, she also served under contract with the Moore-McCormack Lines. Later that year, she was placed out of service and was berthed with the James River Reserve Fleet, Lee Hall, Virginia.

== U.S. Navy service ==
The ship remained there until mid-1958 when she was taken over by the US Navy and converted to a radar picket ship at the Charleston Navy Yard, Charleston, South Carolina. During conversion, she was renamed Watchman and received the designation YAGR-16. However, that designation was changed to AGR-16 before she completed her conversion late in the year. On 5 January 1958, Watchman was placed in commission at Charleston.

Watchman conducted shakedown training in the Guantanamo Bay operating area during February. Following post-shakedown availability at Charleston, from 5 to 18 March, she completed repairs and got underway for the US West Coast. After transiting the Panama Canal, and visiting Acapulco, Mexico, she arrived in her new home port, San Francisco, California, on 11 April.

Assigned to the Continental Air Defense Command (CONAD), she served as one of several radar picket ships operating as seaborne extensions of the command's Contiguous Radar Coverage System. She operated from her base at San Francisco, during her entire naval career, spending an average of 200 days per year actually at sea engaged in picket patrols.

That routine continued until 1 September 1965, at which time she and the remaining AGR's were placed out of commission.

== Decommissioning ==
Her name was struck from the Navy List 1 September 1965, and she was returned to the Maritime Administration (MARAD) for lay up with the Suisun Bay Reserve Fleet, Suisun Bay, California. She remained there until 3 October 1974, when she was sold to American Ship Dismantlers for scrapping.

== Honors and awards ==
Watchman's crew was eligible for the following medals:

- National Defense Service Medal

== Bibliography ==
- "Watchman". Dictionary of American Naval Fighting Ships. Navy Department, Naval History and Heritage Command. 26 October 2015. This article incorporates text from this source, which is in the public domain.
- "Jones Construction, Panama City FL". www.ShipbuildingHistory.com. 13 October 2010.
- Davies, James (May 2004). "Specifications (As-Built)" (PDF). p. 23.
- "SS Vernon S. Hood".
- "USS Watchman (AGR-16)". NavSource. 9 October 2015.
