= SS Lake Frampton =

History

United States
- Name: Lake Frampton
- Owner: USSB
- Operator: West India Steamship Co.
- Ordered: 28 March 1918
- Builder: American Shipbuilding Co., Lorain
- Cost: $806,367.10
- Yard number: 745
- Laid down: 3 August 1918
- Launched: 21 October 1918
- Commissioned: 30 November 1918
- Home port: Cleveland
- Identification: US Official Number 217288; Call sign LPBD
- Fate: Sank, 12 July 1920

General characteristics
- Type: Design 1093 ship
- Tonnage: 2,622 GRT; 1,621 NRT; 4,165 DWT
- Length: 251 ft 0 in (76.50 m)
- Beam: 43 ft 6 in (13.26 m)
- Depth: 26 ft 2 in (7.98 m)
- Installed power: 267 Nhp, 1,300 ihp
- Propulsion: American Shipbuilding Co. 3-cylinder triple expansion
- Speed: 9 1/2 knots (10.9 mph; 17.6 km/h)

Lake Frampton was a steam cargo ship built in 1918 by American Shipbuilding Company of Lorain for the United States Shipping Board (USSB) as part of the wartime shipbuilding program of the Emergency Fleet Corporation (EFC) to restore the nation's Merchant Marine. The vessel was employed in coastal trade during her career and collided with another steamer, SS Comus, and sank in July 1920 on one of her regular trips with a loss of two men.

== Design and construction ==
After the United States entry into World War I, a large shipbuilding program was undertaken to restore and enhance shipping capabilities both of the United States and their Allies. As part of this program, EFC placed orders with nation's shipyards for a large number of vessels of standard designs. Design 1093 cargo ship was a standard cargo freighter of approximately 4,200 tons deadweight capacity designed by Great Lakes Engineering Works and adopted by USSB as a bulk cargo carrier. As shipbuilders along the Great Lakes had significant experience with designing and building ships of that nature, USSB placed their orders with these companies. However, in order to bring the vessels from the Great Lakes to the Atlantic they were to pass through Welland Canal connecting Lake Erie to Lake Ontario and from there continue on to Montreal where they would be commissioned and crewed by American personnel. This arrangement, however, effectively limited these vessels' length and capacity due to dimensions of the Welland Canal. The ship was part of the order for eighteen vessels placed by the Shipping Board with the American Shipbuilding Co. and was laid down on 3 August 1918 at the builder's shipyard in Lorain and launched on 21 October 1918 (yard number 745).

The vessel was designed specifically as a bulk carrier capable of carrying approximately 200,000 cubic feet of bulk cargo on each trip. The ship had two steel decks with poop, forecastle and bridge located on top of her main deck, had her machinery located amidships and had two main cargo holds. A water-tight center-line bulkhead ran the entire length of the ship from keel to the top of main deck. The freighter also possessed all the modern machinery for quick loading and unloading of cargo from four main hatches, including eight winches and a large number of derricks. The vessel was also equipped with wireless apparatus located in the bridge house, had submarine signal system installed and had electrical lights installed along the decks.

As built, the ship was 251 feet 0 inches (76.50 m) long (between perpendiculars) and 43 feet 6 inches (13.26 m) abeam, a depth of 26 feet 2 inches (7.98 m). Lake Frampton was originally assessed at 2,622 GRT and 1,621 NRT and had deadweight of approximately 4,165. The vessel had a steel hull with double bottom and a single 267 Nhp (1,300 ihp) vertical reciprocating triple expansion steam engine, with cylinders of 20-inch (51 cm), 33-inch (84 cm) and 54-inch (140 cm) diameter with a 40-inch (100 cm) stroke, that drove a single screw propeller and moved the ship at up to 9 1/2 knots (10.9 mph; 17.6 km/h). The steam for the engine was supplied by two single-ended Scotch marine boilers fitted for coal.

After successful completion of trials the freighter was handed over to USSB and officially commissioned on November 30.

== Operational history ==
After delivery Lake Frampton sailed from Cleveland on 30 November 1918 for Montreal and from there proceeded on to New York where she arrived on December 22. The ship was then assigned to the West India Steamship Company to serve on their Caribbean to the Northeast route. Lake Frampton sailed out of New York in January 1919 bound for the West Indies. Upon loading full cargo of sugar at Manatí she returned to Philadelphia on February 6, thus successfully concluding her maiden voyage.

The freighter together with several other vessels was then commissioned for one trip to Europe as part of the hunger relief mission. After loading full cargo of pork and other food supplies in New York she departed for Europe in mid March 1919 and arrived at Bordeaux on April 21 to unload her aid cargo. From France the ship sailed on her return trip back to New York via Cardiff. She left Cardiff on April 26, but was forced to return to port after developing problems with her gear. After undergoing temporary repairs, the freighter was able to proceed on her westward trip about a week later, arriving in New York on May 22 where she was put into Morse drydock for further repairs.

After finalizing her repair work, Lake Frampton proceeded to Norfolk and from there to Port Eads where she arrived on July 9. After loading a cargo of lumber the vessel sailed to London and returned to Charleston on August 26. The vessel stayed on her European route until the end of the year, returning to Baltimore on 16 January 1920 with a cargo of iron ore from Huelva. Subsequently, the vessel was shifted to coastal trade, carrying phosphates from Florida to Baltimore, and coal from Norfolk to Cuba, and returning with cargoes of sugar. For example, Lake Frampton cleared out from Norfolk on February 7 with 3,412 tons of coal bound for Cienfuegos.

The freighter arrived at New York on June 13 from Sagua with a cargo of sugar and then proceeded to drydock for repairs and maintenance and remained there for the next 3 weeks.

=== Sinking ===
Lake Frampton left New York on her last voyage, in ballast, at around 18:00 on 11 July 1920 bound for Newport News. The vessel was under command of captain Frank Powers and carried a crew of 37. The freighter proceeded down the coast on her usual course and passed Barnegat Gas Buoy about 01:20 on July 12, about five miles off. The weather was clear, the stars were shining brightly, but there was no moon. The ship was moving at about 10 knots (12 mph; 19 km/h). At the same time, SS Comus was proceeding up the coast at the speed of about 12 knots (14 mph; 22 km/h) on a voyage from New Orleans to New York with around 100 passengers, 78 crew and general cargo. At 02:45 Comus passed Absecon Light and approximately 15 minutes later her second officer on duty saw the range lights of Lake Frampton about 6 or 7 miles away to his left. Shortly after, Lake Frampton changed her course 17° to starboard and continued on at the same speed. Noticing Lake Frampton maneuver, the navigator on Comus ordered a hard astarboard, swinging about 15° attempting to swing the vessel clear. Instead, at about 03:20, east of the Tucker's Beach Light, Comus's stem struck Lake Frampton on her port side forward of the deck, nearly cutting her in half. As Comus reversed her engines, the ships quickly separated and Comus drifted about half a mile away from the stricken freighter.

Lake Frampton started to take on water rapidly, and captain Powers ordered the ship to be abandoned. Due to the vessel listing heavily on port side, only starboard lifeboat could be launched. The captain and fifteen other crew members managed to get into it. The rest of the crew was forced to jump into water. Comus stood by about a mile away and commenced rescue work immediately lowering her own lifeboats. Lake Frampton went down about 10 minutes after the collision. All crew with an exception of an oiler and fireman was rescued by Comus.
