= USS Ranger (SP-237) =

Patrol vessel of the United States Navy

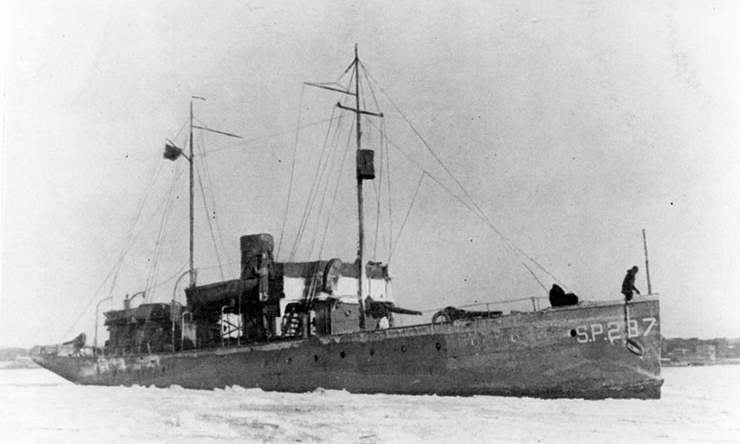
- USS SP-237, formerly USS Ranger (SP-237), in icy waters near New York City 1918 or 1919.

History

United States
- Name: USS Ranger (1917–1918); USS SP-237 (1918–1919)
- Namesake: As Ranger, a wanderer, or military scout (previous name retained); SP-237 was her section patrol number
- Builder: Robert Jacob Shipyard, City Island
- Cost: $80,000 (USD) at time of construction
- Completed: 1910
- Acquired: 22 June 1917
- Commissioned: 9 October 1917
- Decommissioned: 28 April 1919
- Stricken: 4 September 1931
- Fate: Transferred to United States Coast and Geodetic Survey 28 April 1919; Returned to US Navy 26 November 1930 or 31 January 1931; Sold 21 December 1931; Registered in Panama 1932
- Notes: Served as civilian yacht Thomas Slocum and Ranger 1910–1917

General characteristics
- Type: Patrol vessel
- Tonnage: 219 GRT, 149 NRT
- Length: 131.0 ft (39.9 m) registered
- Beam: 22.1 ft (6.7 m)
- Draft: 7 ft 0 in (2.13 m)
- Depth: 10.0 ft (3.0 m)
- Installed power: 45 NHP
- Propulsion: 2 × triple-expansion engines; 2 × screws
- Speed: 13 kn (24 km/h)
- Complement: 45
- Armament: 4 × 6-pounder guns

The fifth USS Ranger (SP-237) was United States Navy patrol vessel in commission from 1917 to 1919.

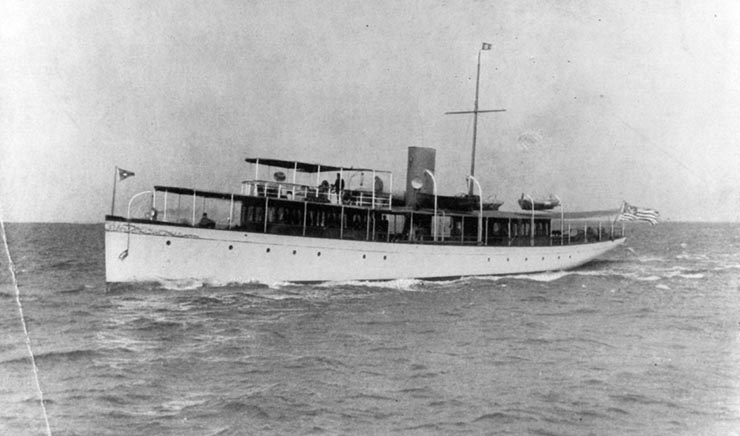
Ranger as a civilian yacht sometime between 1910 and 1916, prior to her U.S. Navy service.

Ranger was built as the steam-driven, steel-hulled yacht Thomas Slocum by Robert Jacob Shipyard at City Island, Bronx, New York, in 1910. She later was renamed Ranger. The US Navy purchased Ranger from her owner, T.W. Slocum of New York City, on 22 June 1917 for World War I service as a patrol vessel and commissioned her as USS Ranger (SP-237) on 9 October 1917.

Assigned to the 3rd Naval District, Ranger operated as a section patrol craft in the New York City area. She was renamed USS SP-237 in 1918.

SP-237 was decommissioned on 28 April 1919 and transferred to the Department of Commerce for use by the United States Coast and Geodetic Survey. She served with the department as USC&GS Ranger until either 26 November 1930 or 31 January 1931, when she was returned to the U.S. Navy. She was stricken from the Navy List on 4 September 1931 and sold on 21 December 1931.

In 1932, registry of the vessel was transferred to Panama.
