= SS Grover C. Hutcherson =

Liberty ship of WWII

History

United States
- Name: Grover C. Hutcherson
- Namesake: Grover C. Hutcherson
- Owner: War Shipping Administration (WSA)
- Operator: Overlakes Freight Corp.
- Ordered: as type (EC2-S-C1) hull, MC hull 2512
- Awarded: 23 April 1943
- Builder: St. Johns River Shipbuilding Company, Jacksonville, Florida
- Cost: $942,829
- Yard number: 76
- Way number: 4
- Laid down: 21 November 1944
- Launched: 22 December 1944
- Sponsored by: Mrs. A.J. Gollnick
- Completed: 31 December 1944
- Identification: Call sign: ANDN
- Fate: Laid up in the, National Defense Reserve Fleet, Wilmington, North Carolina, 28 April 1948; Laid up in the, James River Reserve Fleet, Lee Hall, Virginia, 28 May 1952; Sold for scrapping, 12 September 1972, removed from fleet, 6 November 1972

General characteristics
- Class & type: Liberty ship; type EC2-S-C1, standard
- Tonnage: 10,865 LT DWT; 7,176 GRT
- Displacement: 3,380 long tons (3,434 t) (light); 14,245 long tons (14,474 t) (max)
- Length: 441 feet 6 inches (135 m) oa; 416 feet (127 m) pp; 427 feet (130 m) lwl
- Beam: 57 feet (17 m)
- Draft: 27 ft 9.25 in (8.4646 m)
- Installed power: 2 × Oil fired 450 °F (232 °C) boilers, operating at 220 psi (1,500 kPa); 2,500 hp (1,900 kW)
- Propulsion: 1 × triple-expansion steam engine, (manufactured by General Machinery Corp., Hamilton, Ohio); 1 × screw propeller
- Speed: 11.5 knots (21.3 km/h; 13.2 mph)
- Capacity: 562,608 cubic feet (15,931 m^{3}) (grain); 499,573 cubic feet (14,146 m^{3}) (bale)
- Complement: 38–62 USMM; 21–40 USNAG
- Armament: Varied by ship; Bow-mounted 3-inch (76 mm)/50-caliber gun; Stern-mounted 4-inch (102 mm)/50-caliber gun; 2–8 × single 20-millimeter (0.79 in) Oerlikon anti-aircraft (AA) cannons and/or, 2–8 × 37-millimeter (1.46 in) M1 AA guns

SS Grover C. Hutcherson was a Liberty ship built in the United States during World War II. She was named after Grover C. Hutcherson, a Merchant seaman killed on the Liberty ship SS Timothy Pickering when she was struck by an Italian Junkers Ju 87 Stuka while anchored off August Sicily, 13 July 1943.

== Construction ==
Grover C. Hutcherson was laid down on 21 November 1944, under a Maritime Commission (MARCOM) contract, MC hull 2512, by the St. Johns River Shipbuilding Company, Jacksonville, Florida; she was sponsored by Mrs. A.J. Gollnick, the wife of the assistant general superintendent in charge of St. John's River SB, and was launched on 22 December 1944.

== History ==
She was allocated to the Overlakes Freight Corp., on 31 December 1944. She was detained by police in Trieste in May 1947, after millions of contraband cigarettes were discovered in her hold. On 28 April 1948, she was laid up in the National Defense Reserve Fleet, Wilmington, North Carolina. On 28 May 1952, she was laid up in the James River Reserve Fleet, Lee Hall, Virginia. On 17 May 1954, she was withdrawn from the fleet to be loaded with grain under the "Grain Program 1954", she returned loaded on 26 May 1954. On 4 October 1956, she was withdrawn to be unload, she returned reloaded with grain on 22 October 1956. On 9 September 1963, she was withdrawn from the fleet to be unloaded, she returned empty on 26 September 1963. She was sold for scrapping, 12 September 1972, to Isaac Varela, for $80,007. She was removed from the fleet on 6 November 1972.

== Bibliography ==
- "St. John's River Shipbuilding, Jacksonville FL". www.ShipbuildingHistory.com. 16 October 2010.
- Maritime Administration. "Grover C. Hutcherson". Ship History Database Vessel Status Card. U.S. Department of Transportation, Maritime Administration.
- Davies, James (May 2004). "Specifications (As-Built)" (PDF). p. 23.
- "SS Grover C. Hutcherson".
