= USS Resolute (SP-3003) =

Tender of the United States Navy

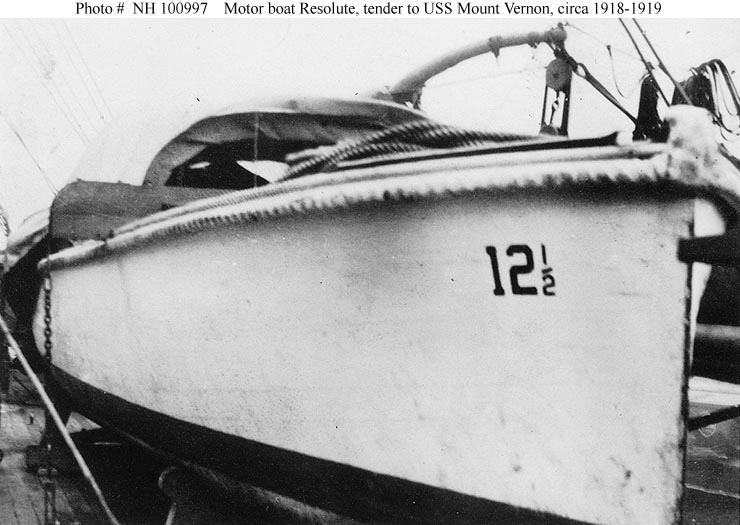
- USS Resolute aboard transport USS Mount Vernon (ID-4508) in 1918 or 1919.

History

United States
- Name: USS Resolute
- Namesake: Resolute: marked by firm determination; resolved (previous name retained)
- Builder: Robert Jacob, City Island, New York
- Completed: 1913
- Acquired: 12 January 1918
- Fate: Probably discarded ca. 1919
- Notes: In use as private motorboat 1913-1918 and probably from 1919

General characteristics
- Type: Ship's tender
- Displacement: 7.8 tons
- Length: 36 ft (11 m)
- Beam: 7 ft 9 in (2.36 m)
- Draft: 2 ft 6 in (0.76 m)
- Speed: 10 knots

Note: This ship should not be confused with the third USS Resolute (SP-1309) or fourth USS Resolute (SP-3218), which were in commission at the same time.

The fifth USS Resolute (SP-3003), also referred to by the designation ID-3003, was a motorboat that entered service in the United States Navy as a ship's tender in 1918.

Resolute was built as a private motorboat during 1913 at the yard of Robert Jacob at City Island, New York. The U.S. Navy acquired her on 21 January 1918 from her owner, George A. Cormack of New York City, for use during World War I, placing her in service as USS Resolute, designated either SP-3003 or ID-3003, the difference in reported designation occurring perhaps because the U.S. Navy sometimes used the "SP" and "Id. No." designations interchangeably for civilian vessels procured for World War I service.

Resolute served her entire U.S. Navy career as a ship's tender for the transport USS Mount Vernon (ID-4508), and was carried aboard Mount Vernon for use at Mount Vernon's various ports of call.

Records of Resolute's career otherwise are lacking. Mount Vernon was decommissioned in September 1919, and it is likely that Resolute was disposed of, perhaps by sale, around that time.
