= USS Resolute (SP-3218) =

Patrol vessel of the United States Navy

History

United States
- Name: USS Resolute
- Namesake: Resolute: marked by firm determination; resolved (previous name retained)
- Completed: 1906
- Acquired: 8 August 1918
- Commissioned: 14 January 1919
- Fate: Transferred to United States Marine Corps 31 May 1919
- Notes: In commercial service 1906–1918; In U.S. Marine Corps service 1919–1920; In commercial service from 1920

General characteristics
- Type: Tug
- Tonnage: 68 tons
- Length: 89 ft (27 m)
- Beam: 17 ft (5.2 m)
- Draft: 8 ft (2.4 m) (mean)
- Speed: 6.9 knots
- Complement: 14

Note: This ship should not be confused with the third USS Resolute (SP-1309) or fifth USS Resolute (SP-3003), which were in commission at the same time.

The fourth USS Resolute (SP-3218) was a tug that served in the United States Navy in 1919.

Resolute was built as a wooden-hulled commercial tug in 1906 at Mobile, Alabama. She was ordered purchased from her owner, John Emile Dredging Company of Jacksonville, Florida, on 8 August 1918 for World War I service in the U.S. Navy. The war had ended by the time she was commissioned as USS Resolute (SP-3218) on 14 January 1919.

Resolute performed local patrol and minesweeping duties within the Parris Island, South Carolina, Section Patrol area, operating from Port Royal, South Carolina.

On 31 May 1919, Resolute was transferred to the United States Marine Corps at Parris Island. On 21 April 1920, she was sold to West India Steamship Company of New York City, for which she served through at least 1926. No records are available regarding her operations or fate after 1926.
