= USS Resolute (SP-1309) =

Tugboat of the United States Navy

History

United States
- Name: USS Resolute
- Namesake: Resolute: marked by firm determination; resolved (previous name retained)
- Builder: Great Lakes Engineering Company, Ashtabula, Ohio
- Completed: 1916
- Acquired: 8 August 1918
- Commissioned: 10 September 1918
- Decommissioned: 15 May 1919
- Fate: Sold 15 May 1919
- Notes: In commercial service as SS Sarah E. McWilliams and SS Resolute 1916-1918 and as SS Resolute 1919-1955; Scrapped 1955

General characteristics
- Type: Tug
- Tonnage: 453 tons
- Length: 135 ft (41 m) between perpendiculars
- Beam: 30 ft (9.1 m)
- Draft: 14 ft 6 in (4.42 m)
- Propulsion: Steam engine
- Speed: 12 knots
- Complement: 55

Note: This ship should not be confused with the fourth USS Resolute (SP-3218) or fifth USS Resolute (SP-3003), which were in commission at the same time.

The third USS Resolute (SP-1309) was a tug that served in the United States Navy from 1918 to 1919.

Resolute, was built as the commercial wooden-hulled salvage tug SS Sarah E. McWilliams during 1916 by Great Lakes Engineering Company at Ashtabula, Ohio. She had been renamed SS Resolute by the time the U.S. Navy purchased her for World War I service from her owner, Merritt and Chapman Company of New York City on 8 August 1918. She was commissioned on 10 September 1918 as USS Resolute (SP-1309).

Resolute was based at the Central District Salvage Station at Stapleton on Staten Island, New York, throughout her U.S. Navy career. She performed local towing duty, took part in several salvage operations, and assisted in patrolling the local anchorages.

Decommissioned on 15 May 1919, Resolute was sold to her former owner the same day and returned to mercantile service. She remained in mercantile service until scrapped in 1955.

During early 1942 Resolute again served the U.S. Navy, operating for several months as a commercial tug under a charter to perform salvage work on the United States East Coast.
