= USS Tacony (SP-5) =

Patrol vessel of the United States Navy

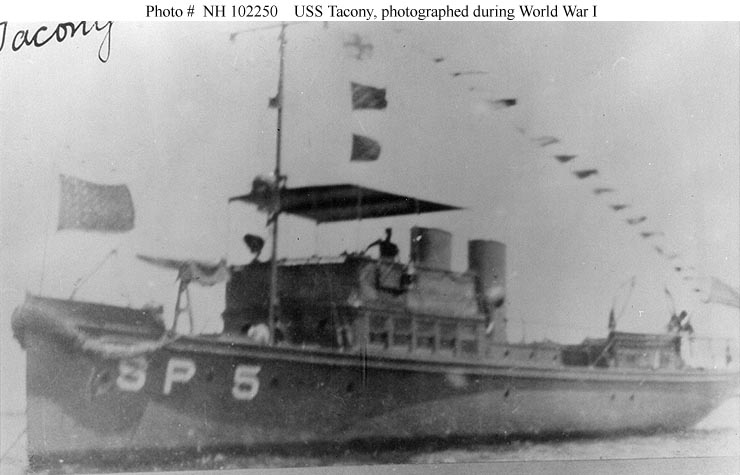
- USS Tacony during World War I

History

United States
- Name: Tacony
- Namesake: Tacony, a section of northeastern Philadelphia, Pennsylvania
- Builder: Mathis Yacht Building Company, Camden, New Jersey
- Completed: 1911
- Acquired: 1917
- Commissioned: 24 May 1917
- Fate: Returned to owner 29 November 1918
- Notes: Operated as private yacht Sybilla II 1911-1917

General characteristics
- Type: Section patrol vessel
- Displacement: 46 tons
- Length: 82 ft 0 in (24.99 m)
- Beam: 13 ft 6 in (4.11 m)
- Draft: 4 ft 4 in (1.32 m)
- Depth: 7 ft 5 in (2.26 m)
- Propulsion: Craig 6-cyl. gasoline engine
- Speed: 12.5 kn (23.2 km/h; 14.4 mph)
- Complement: 12
- Armament: 1 × 1-pounder gun; 1 × machine gun

The second USS Tacony (SP-5) was an armed yacht that served in the United States Navy as a Section patrol vessel from 24 May 1917 to 29 November 1918. The yacht had been built in 1911 by the Mathis Yacht Building Company at Camden, New Jersey for John Fred Betz, III, of Essington, Pennsylvania and member of the Philadelphia Yacht Club as Sybilla II. (Note: The Dictionary of American Naval Fighting Ships contains two errors for this entry. The owner was Betz, not Botz, and the propulsion was gasoline engines, not steam.) The vessel was Mathis yard number seven with 208469 the official number issued.

== Sybilla II ==
Sybilla II was built with the necessary requirements for the popular power boat racing of the time but with more attention to features associated with general cruising and leisure comfort. Two staterooms were located aft with a "lobby" passageway and additional sleeping area and a fully equipped bathroom. Forward of the engine room was the galley and a saloon with buffets and seating. Forward of the saloon were quarters for up to six crew with a captain's stateroom and a toilet. The owners quarters, finished in African mahogany and trimmed with ivory, were located forward. Ten people could be accommodated in the owner's quarters. Auxiliary boats were a fifteen-foot mahogany tender carried on port side davits and a stern hung twelve foot dinghy.

Propulsion was by an especially built Craig six cylinder engine of 150 horsepower with two 850 gallon gasoline tanks installed in the engine room. Two masts and two funnels were somewhat unusual features of the motorboat with the mast capable of carrying sails for emergency propulsion or sailing if desired. Electricity was provided by a separate electric plant.

By late 1916 Betz had purchased the 120 foot (36.6 m) yacht Paragon, later renamed Sybilla III, from Charles J. Davol of Providence, Rhode Island with that vessel being prepared for a cruise to Florida with Betz and friends. Sybilla II was sold to Jacob S. Disston of the Tacony section of Philadelphia, Pennsylvania and renamed Tacony.

== Navy acquisition ==
In 1917 the U.S. Navy acquired the motor yacht from her owner on a free lease for service in World War I and commissioned her as USS Tacony (SP-5) on 24 May 1917. Tacony was assigned patrol duty in the 4th Naval District through the end of World War I. On 29 November 1918, Tacony was returned to her owner.
