= List of La Salle University people =

This list of La Salle University people includes alumni, faculty, presidents, and other individuals associated with La Salle University.

== Alumni ==
- Note: Individuals may be listed in more than one category.

=== Government, law, and public policy ===
- Francis L. Bodine – former member of New Jersey General Assembly
- Kevin J. Boyle – member of Pennsylvania House of Representatives since 2011
- William J. Burns – U.S. ambassador to Jordan; deputy secretary of state 2011–2014; head of Carnegie Endowment for International Peace
- John F. Byrne Sr. – Pennsylvania state senator for the 8th district 1951–1952, Philadelphia city councilman
- Billy Ciancaglini – Republican nominee for mayor of Philadelphia, 2019
- Tina Davis – member of Pennsylvania House of Representatives
- Madeleine Dean – U.S. congresswoman
- Joseph DeFelice – former chair of Philadelphia GOP, current Trump appointee
- Joseph T. Doyle – Pennsylvania state representative for the 163rd district 1971–78
- Michael Driscoll – businessman, member of Philadelphia City Council since 2022, founder of the iconic Philadelphia Irish pub Finnigan's Wake
- Dwight Evans – U.S. congressman from Pennsylvania's 2nd congressional district
- Edward Fenlon – former member of Michigan House of Representatives and jurist
- Brian Fitzpatrick – U.S. congressman from Pennsylvania's 8th congressional district
- Tom Gola – NBA Naismith Hall of Fame basketball player; Philadelphia city controller 1970–71
- William F. Harrity – national chairman of Democratic Party (1892–1896)
- Tom Houghton – former Pennsylvania state representative
- William F. Keller – member of Pennsylvania House of Representatives
- Jim Kenney – mayor of Philadelphia 2016–2024
- Emmett Joseph Leahy (1910–1964) – archivist and entrepreneur, pioneer in the discipline of records management
- Joanna E. McClinton – Pennsylvania state representative since 2015
- Tom Murt – Pennsylvania state representative from the 152nd district
- Dennis M. O'Brien – speaker of Pennsylvania House of Representatives; Philadelphia city councilman
- Michael H. O'Brien – Pennsylvania House of Representatives
- Mark Squilla – member of Philadelphia City Council
- Michael J. Stack III – lieutenant governor of Pennsylvania alongside Tom Wolf
- John Waldron – criminal defense lawyer
- Sarah Wescott-Williams – first prime minister of Country Saint Maarten (2010–2014)
- Chris Wogan – former Pennsylvania representative and judge

=== Business ===
- Tom Curley – co-creator, former president of USA Today
- Larry Miller – president of the Jordan Brand

=== Academia & education ===
- Stephen Andriole – Thomas G. Labrecque Chair of Business Technology at Villanova University
- John D. Caputo – Thomas J. Watson Professor of Humanities at Syracuse University; founder of weak theology
- Naomi Halas – Stanley C. Moore Professor in Electrical and Computer Engineering and professor in Chemistry at Rice University
- Paula Krebs – executive director of the Modern Language Association (MLA), 2017–present
- Michael McGinniss – president of Christian Brothers University, 1994–1999, and La Salle University, 1999–2014

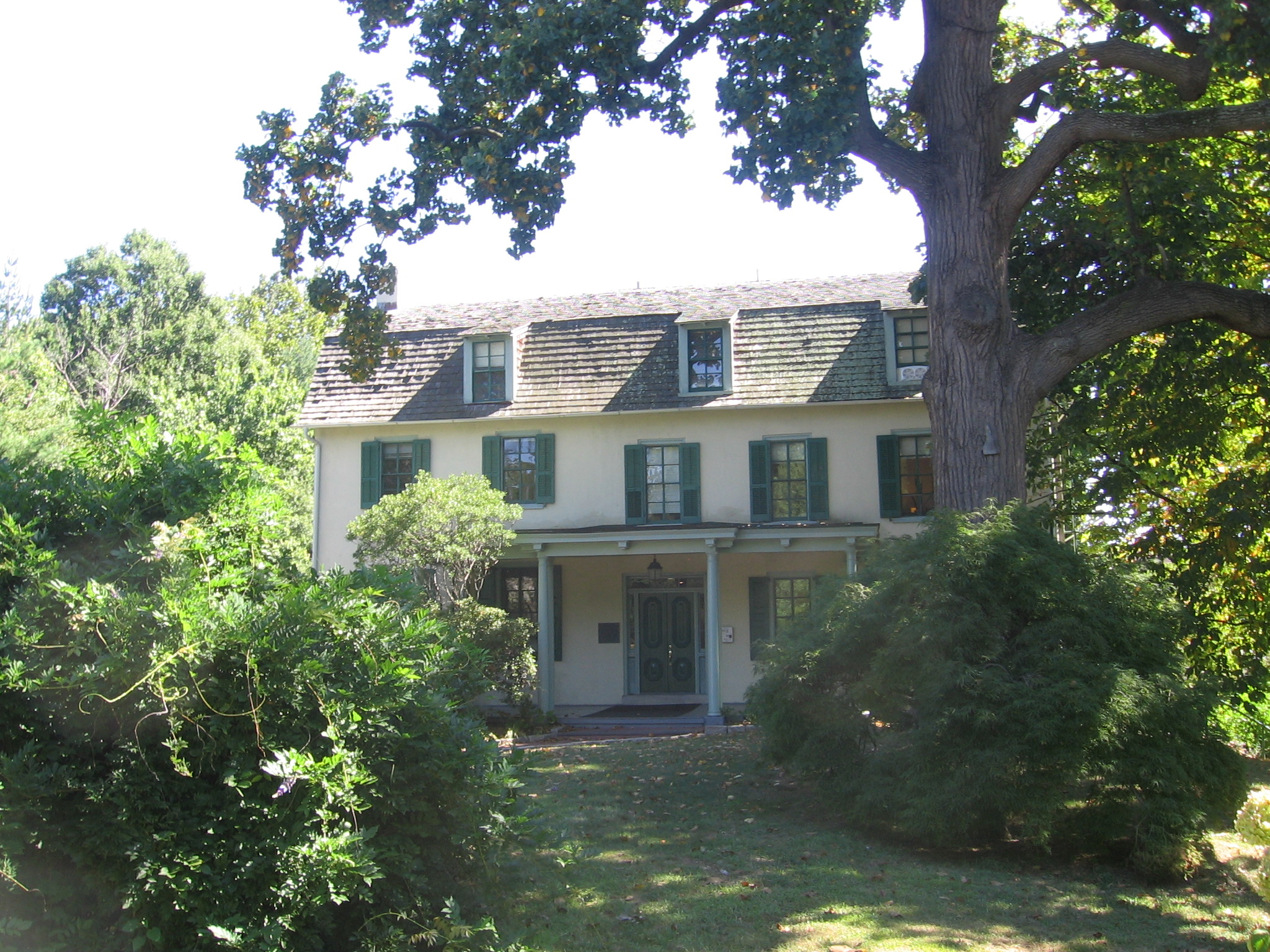
Peale House on Belfield, the current Alumni House

=== Literature ===
- Michael F. Flynn – science fiction author
- Charles Fuller – playwright, winner of the Pulitzer Prize
- Jack McDevitt – science fiction author
- Matthew Quick – author

=== Fine arts ===
- John McShain – builder of The Pentagon, Jefferson Memorial, and Kennedy Center

=== Entertainment ===
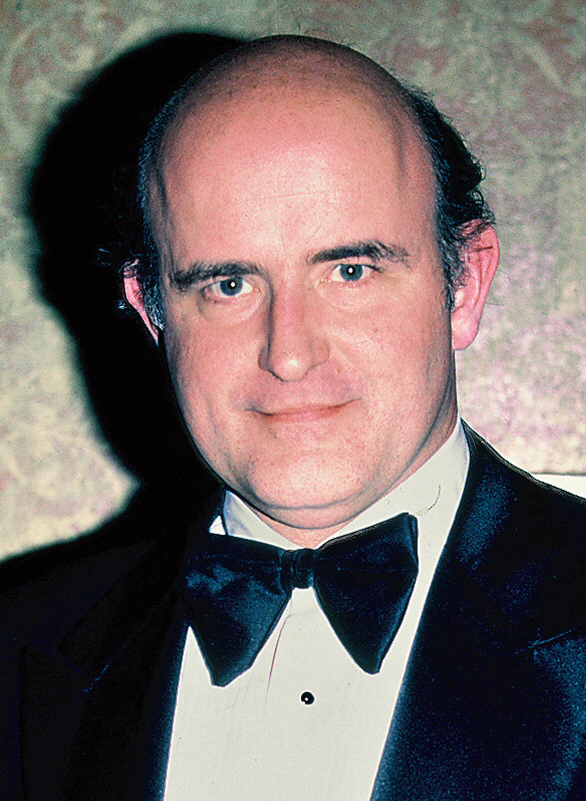
Peter Boyle

- Jessica Barth – actress
- Peter Boyle – Emmy Award-winning actor
- Ralph Garman – actor, voice actor
- Kevin Wildes – sports television personality, producer

=== Journalism and media ===
- Adam Bagni – sportscaster
- Bob Brinker – nationally syndicated radio broadcaster and host of Moneytalk
- Tom Curley – founder of USA Today, former CEO of AP
- A.J. Daulerio – editor-in-chief of Gawker, Deadspin, The Small Bow
- Brady Hicks – wrestling journalist
- Jack Jones - journalist and television news anchor
- Tim Legler – NBA, ESPN analyst
- Meredith Marakovits – YES Network reporter
- Jillian Mele – former host at Fox News, current host at WPVI-TV
- Bill Raftery – ESPN and CBS Sports college basketball analyst
- Gary Smith – sportswriter

=== Miscellaneous ===
- Michael William Brescia – convicted bank robber, part of the Midwest Bank Robbers group
- Johnny Dougherty – labor leader
- Ellwood Kieser – priest; producer, Insight, Romero
- Walter P. Lomax Jr. – medical practitioner

=== Athletics ===
==== American football ====
- Mike Mandarino – NFL
- George Somers – NFL

==== Soccer ====
- Cesidio Colasante – MLS draft pick
- John McCarthy – goalkeeper for the Philadelphia Union
- Courtney Niemiec – defender for the Portland Thorns FC
- Ryan Richter – defender for Ottawa Fury FC

==== Basketball ====
- Michael Brooks – NBA and Europe; professional career lasted 1980–2008
- Joe Bryant – NBA and Europe, father of Kobe Bryant, former head coach of Los Angeles Sparks of WNBA
- Rasual Butler – last played for the San Antonio Spurs; died on January 31, 2018
- Larry Cannon – ABA player
- Fran Dunphy – head coach for La Salle Explorers men's basketball
- Larry Foust – 8-time NBA All-Star (1951–1956, 1958–1959)
- Ramon Galloway – professional basketball player
- Tom Gola – enshrined in Naismith Memorial Basketball Hall of Fame in 1976; NBA champion (1956); 5-time NBA All-Star (1960–1964); No. 15 retired by La Salle

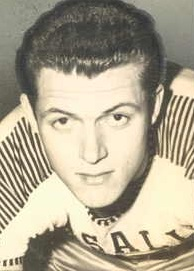
Tom Gola's number 15 is retired by La Salle University. The Tom Gola Arena is named after him.

- B.J. Johnson – current NBA player
- Tim Legler – NBA, analyst for ESPN's NBA coverage
- Ralph Lewis – NBA player
- Joe Mihalich – head coach of Hofstra University men's basketball
- Larry Miller – former president of NBA's Portland Trail Blazers; president of Jordan Brand
- Jeff Neubauer – head coach of Eastern Kentucky University men's basketball
- Doug Overton – NBA, played in 11 NBA seasons for eight different teams; head coach for Springfield Armor
- Jim Phelan – basketball player and coach
- Tom Piotrowski – basketball, NBA, FIBA, CBA
- Bill Raftery – ESPN and CBS Sports college basketball analyst
- Cheryl Reeve – head coach of WNBA's Minnesota Lynx; by percentage the winningest coach in league's history, most postseason games of any WNBA coach
- Lionel Simmons – NBA, third-leading scorer in NCAA history; drafted 7th overall by Sacramento Kings in 1990
- Steven Smith – NBA, Serie A player
- Christian Standhardinger – BBL player
- Fatty Taylor – ABA, NBA player
- Randy Woods – NBA player
- Stephen Zack (born 1992) – basketball player for Hapoel Holon in the Israeli Basketball Premier League

==== Olympians ====
La Salle Olympians have won a total of seven medals (five gold, and two bronze) in 12 Olympic Games.

- Diane Bracalente – field hockey, Seoul 1988
- Al Cantello – track and field, Rome 1960
- Stan Cwiklinski – rowing, gold medal, men's eight, Tokyo 1964
- Hugh Foley – rowing, gold medal, men's eight, Tokyo 1964
- Charles Kieffer – rowing, gold medal, men's pair with coxswain, Los Angeles 1932
- Kathy McGahey – field hockey, bronze medal, Los Angeles 1984
- Diane Moyer – field hockey, Moscow 1980; bronze medal, Los Angeles 1984
- Cheryl Reeve – USA women's basketball, Paris 2024, head coach of the Olympic gold-medal team
- John Uelses – first person to pole vault 16' (4.88 m), setting the world record (failed to qualify at trials)
- Joe Verdeur – swimming, gold medal, in 200 meter breaststroke, London 1948

== Faculty ==
=== Former faculty ===
- Austin App – considered America's first major Holocaust denier
- Madeleine Dean – English writing and ethics professor for 10 years in La Salle's Arts and Sciences department
- Joseph DeFelice – former chair of the Philadelphia GOP
- John Lukacs – historian specializing in populism
- Paul Westhead – English professor at La Salle 1972–1979 and NBA head coach for the 1980 championship-winning Los Angeles Lakers

=== Selected men's basketball head coaches ===
Head coach	Tenure
Ken Loeffler	1949–1955
Tom Gola	1968–1970
Paul Westhead	1970–1979
William "Speedy" Morris	1986–2001
Billy Hahn	2001–2004
John Giannini	2004–2018
Ashley Howard	2018–2022
Fran Dunphy	2022–present

== University presidents ==
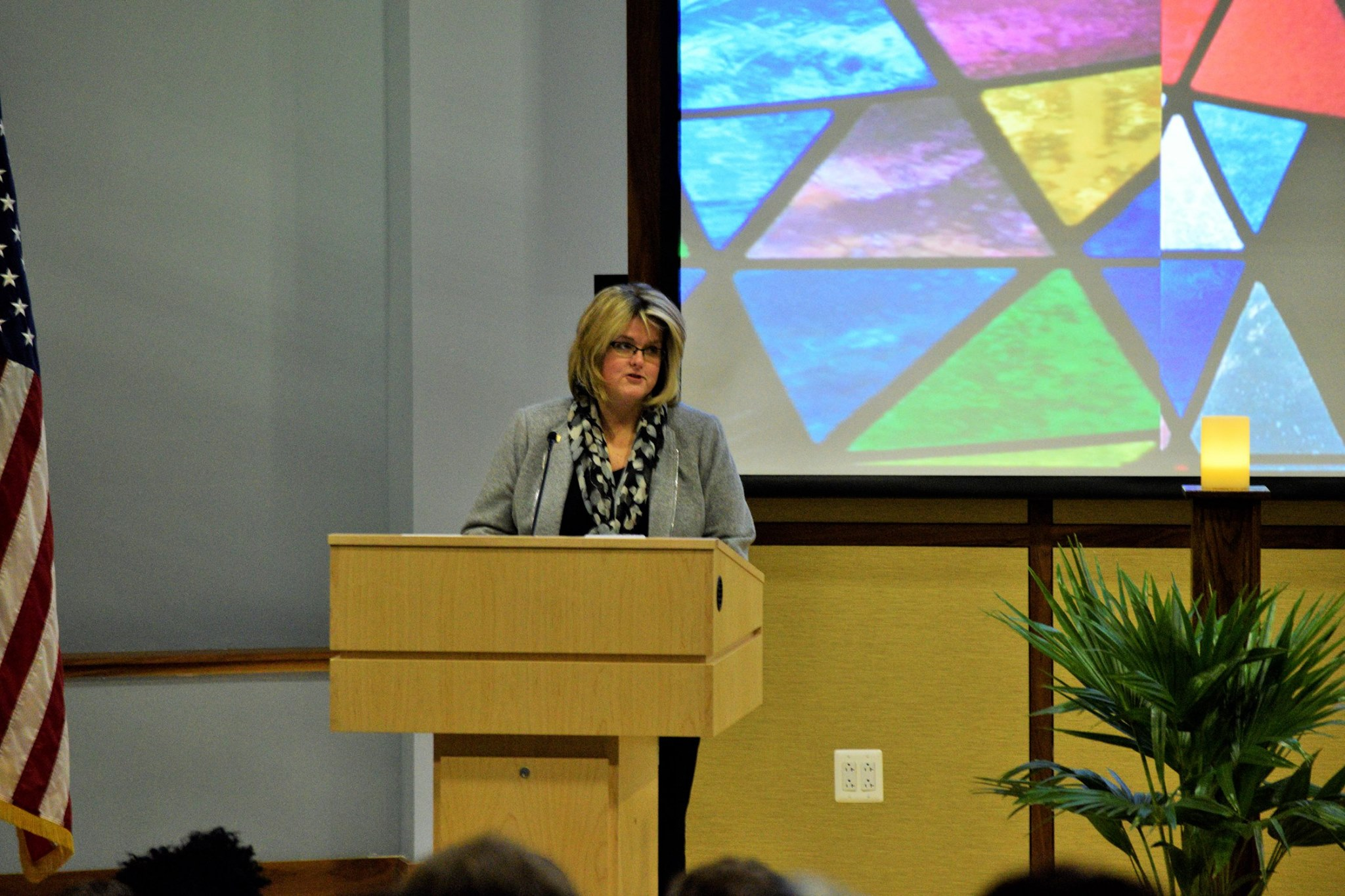
Dr. Colleen Hanycz, president of La Salle University 2015–2021 and first female president in the school's history

President	Tenure
Brother Teliow	1863
Brother Oliver	1863–1872
Brother Noah	1872–1875
Brother Joachim of Mary	1875–1876
Brother Stephen of Jesus	1876–1878
Brother Romuald	1878–1883
Brother Clementian	1883–1885
Brother Fabrician	1885–1887
Brother Isidore John	1887–1889
Brother Abraham of Jesus	1889–1890
Brother Isidore John	1890–1900
Brother Wolfred of Mary	1900–1903
Brother Abdas John	1903–1911
Brother Denis Edward	1911–1917
Brother Ennodius Richard	1917–1922
Brother Galbert Lucian	1922–1925
Brother Dorotheus Lewis	1925–1928
Brother Elzear Alfred	1928–1932
Brother Edwin Anselm	1932–1941
Brother Emilian James	1941–1945
Brother Dominic Luke	1945
Brother Gregorian Paul	1945–1952
Brother Erminus Stanislaus	1952–1958
Brother Daniel Bernian	1958–1969
Brother Daniel Burke	1969–1976
Brother Patrick Ellis	1977–1992
Brother Joseph Burke	1992–1998
Nicholas Giordano	1998–1999 (interim)
Brother Michael McGinniss	1999–2014
Dr. James Gallagher	2014–2015 (interim)
Dr. Colleen Hanycz	2015–2021
Tim O’Shaughnessy	2021–2022 (interim)
Dr. Daniel J. Allen	2022–present
