= Adam Bagni =

American journalist and sportscaster

- Born: Taunton, Massachusetts, U.S.
- Education: La Salle University
- Occupations: Former Journalist & Sportscaster
- Notable credit(s): WCVB, KPNX, WHDH, WJAR, WEEI, WNCF, WEXP

Adam Michael Bagni (/ˈbæɡni/; born in Taunton, MA) is an American former journalist and sportscaster.

== Biography ==
=== College ===
Bagni is a graduate of La Salle University in Philadelphia. While at La Salle, he served as general manager of WEXP and was the play-by-play voice for campus radio sports broadcasts. He was also a writer for the Collegian.

=== Career ===
Bagni is a former reporter at WCVB in Boston. He left the station and was named Director of Communications and Community Relations at Wentworth-Douglass Hospital in 2020 and now works for Boston Globe Media. Previously, he was an anchor/reporter at KPNX in Phoenix, where he also contributed to the station's investigative unit. He was previously a reporter at WHDH in Boston and the Massachusetts bureau reporter, and a sports anchor/reporter, for WJAR. During his time there, he also worked on radio as a flash anchor on WEEI.

Previously, he was the sports director at WNCF. He left the station in March 2011.

Bagni has received multiple Emmy Award nominations by the National Academy of Television Arts and Sciences, as well as honors from the National Sportscasters and Sportswriters Association, Alabama Broadcasters Association and Pennsylvania Association of Broadcasters.
