= Sarah Fischer =

Sarah Fischer may refer to:

- Sarah Fischer (soprano) (1898–1975), French-born Canadian soprano
- Sarah Fischer (weightlifter) (born 2000), Austrian weightlifter

== See also ==
- Sara Fischer (born 1979), Swedish snowboarder
- Sarah Fisher (disambiguation)
