= Michael McGinniss =

De La Salle Christian Brother and University President

Brother Michael J. McGinniss, F.S.C., Ph.D., a De La Salle Christian Brother, was the 28th president of La Salle University in Philadelphia, U.S. McGinniss became president on July 1, 1999. He had been a member of La Salle University's Religion department and was president of Christian Brothers University in Memphis, Tennessee from 1994 to 1999.

== Early life ==
A native Philadelphian, McGinniss joined the De La Salle Christian Brothers in 1965 and graduated maxima cum laude from La Salle University in 1970 with a BA degree in English. He obtained his master's degree and Ph.D. in Theology from the University of Notre Dame.

From 1970 to 1974, he was a member of the English and Religion departments at South Hills Catholic High School in Pittsburgh, Pennsylvania. While a graduate student at the University of Notre Dame, he taught undergraduate courses in the Theology Department and was assistant rector of Grace Hall.

His first teaching experience at La Salle was as a visiting instructor in the Graduate Religion Program in the summer of 1978. He was also an assistant professor at the Washington Theological Union from 1979 to 1984. From 1986 to 1990, he was a visiting instructor at Loyola University's Summer Institute of Pastoral Studies.

== Academic career ==
In 1984, McGinniss joined the faculty at La Salle on a full-time basis, eventually reaching the rank of full professor in 1993. Recognized by the De La Salle Christian Brothers for his qualities as a leader, he attended La session internationale des études lasalliennes (a program of study of Lasallian spirituality) in Rome in 1991. He became Chair of La Salle's Religion Department in 1991, and the following year he received the Lindback Distinguished Teaching Award. Also in 1992, he was appointed vice president of the La Salle University Corporation. In 1995, he became a member of La Salle's Board of Trustees.

In 1994, he became president of Christian Brothers University. Under his leadership undergraduate enrollment and retention rates were increased; a Graduate Education Program was established; the Athletic Department joined the NCAA Division II Gulf South Conference; new residence halls were constructed; enhancements were made to science labs and facilities; the school's Engineering departments were re-accredited; an upgrade of information technology systems throughout the campus was implemented; and the Center for Global Enterprise was founded. He also played a key role in the school's 125th anniversary celebration.

He has published articles in such journals as Listening: Journal of Religion and Culture and New Theology Review. He has written chapters in religious books and texts, including "The Catholic University as a Context for Pastoral Studies: Reflections on Three Programs" in Pastoral Studies in the University Setting (University of Ottawa Press). He edited six volumes of the Christian Brothers' Spirituality Seminar Series. Since 1983, his reviews of books have appeared in journals such as Horizons, Theological Studies, Journal of Ecumenical Studies, and Holistic Nursing Practice. For many years, he has lectured to a variety of academic and professional groups on issues related to spirituality, pastoral care, and theology.

His academic areas of expertise are pastoral theology, history and theology of ministry, methods and models of theological reflection, ecclesiology, and Lasallian spirituality.

McGinniss serves on the Boards of the Association of Independent Colleges and Universities of Pennsylvania, American University of Rome, Manhattan College, Calvert Hall College (Baltimore, Maryland), the Greater Philadelphia Urban Affairs Coalition, the Greater Philadelphia Chamber of Commerce, and the Office of Community Development of the Archdiocese of Philadelphia. In addition, he is a member of the Chairman's Advisory Council for the World Affairs Council of Philadelphia.

His professional memberships include the Catholic Theological Society of America, the American Academy of Religion, the College Theology Society, the Lasallian Association of College and University Presidents, and the International Association of Lasallian Universities.

== President of La Salle University ==
Under McGinniss' direction, La Salle University had developed a new strategic plan and significantly increased enrollment, giving, and alumni involvement. La Salle opened a new residence hall for 428 students and an adjoining dining facility in 2005. In cooperation with the board of trustees, McGinniss launched "Shoulder to Shoulder", a fundraising initiative to raise $25 million for the construction of a new science and technology center and the strengthening of the endowment for student scholarships. Under his leadership, La Salle underwent significant expansion; it began construction of a new business school, dormitories, dining halls, and other resources. The legacy of McGinniss' strategic plan remains ambiguous after his successor was left with a large deficit and faltering credit rating.

When Colleen Hanycz succeeded McGinniss as La Salle University President in 2015, she inherited serious financial straits. There was a $12 million shortfall in La Salle's budget, which represented about 9 percent of the $132 million of the total operating budget. After McGinniss stepped down, there was also a large dip in enrollment. The 2015 freshman class was about 725, well below its target. Enrollment decreased by 135 students, about 16 percent less, than the 2014 freshman class of 860.

== Post-presidential career ==
McGinniss continues to live and work at La Salle. He is currently the advisor of his alma mater's Honors program.

Preceded by Nicholas Giordano	President of La Salle University; 1999–2014	Succeeded by Colleen Hanycz
