= WEXP (La Salle University) =

Coordinates: 40.0390°N 75.1556°W

- United States
- Broadcast area: Philadelphia, Pennsylvania
- Branding: La Salle University Radio

Programming
- Format: Freeform

Ownership
- Owner: La Salle University

History
- First air date: 1972
- Last air date: 2020

WEXP was a free-form campus radio station in Philadelphia, which operated for nearly 50 years. The station primarily operated as a very low powered carrier current station, with its coverage limited to the La Salle University campus. At times it was also simulcast over the La Salle TV channel's Second Audio Program (SAP), and distributed over the Internet.

Because of its extremely low power, the radio station did not need a license from the Federal Communications Commission (FCC) or receive official call letters. However, the self-assigned identifier of "WEXP", short for "explorer", was adopted. Originally on 640 AM, the carrier current transmissions moved to 530 AM to avoid interference from WWJZ, a new FCC-licensed 50,000 watt station assigned to 640 AM starting around 1992. Towards the end of WEXP's existence, the transmission briefly moved to 1600 kHz AM before suspending broadcasting.

== History ==
WEXP opened its studio at La Salle University in 1972. Initially, the radio station could only be heard inside a few select buildings on campus, and the cost of the station was said to have been around $7,500 at that time (or, about $51,555 in 2023 dollars based on inflation the index). The station received a $1,000 start-up grant from U.S. Ambassador to Britain Walter Annenberg. Airing on 640 AM, "EXPlorer 64" was founded as a co-curricular activity, with minimal occasional overlap with the school's communication and marketing departments. WEXP's early programming featured live commentary and music. Coverage of La Salle basketball was also Arlington, Virginia. The station only aired from 10 a.m. to 3 p.m.

In early 1971, the university had explored an opportunity to purchase WPWT 91.7 FM, and operate on an FCC-licensed basis. Some students and professors from the communication department pushed for support of the acquisition. The University Budget Committee, however, rejected a plan that might have given WEXP an FCC-regulated FM station, as the available FM signal required a financial commitment of at least $50,000 per year. This signal was instead conceded to Drexel University whose administration was actually willing to accept a recurring investment which running a radio station full-time around the clock would have entailed. "EXPress 530", as the station was referred to, was doomed to just a carrier current AM signal to await someone more caring and committed to come around and polish it up again and have it be useful for more than just resume filler.

In 1997, WEXP began simulcasting over La Salle TV cable television, but the relationship between the two campus stations was short-lived. In 2000, a proposal to turn WEXP into a low-power FM station also failed. However, with the advent of computers in every dorm, where AM radios became scarcer to find, the station chose to embark on a primarily internet focus, setting up a partnership with Live365 beginning in 2002, later rehoming its web streaming to a local internet server via Shoutcast. These investments re-energized the station by recruiting more members and broadening listenership on campus and around the world. The station launched its online presence with a contest to win a free trip to the then Nokia Sugar Bowl in New Orleans for the first caller who could identify the tune "The Real Slim Shady" by the artist Eminem from the first few bars of Nokia's ringtone based on that tune. A student named Aileen G. was the first to call in and earn the tickets.

WEXP's format could never be confined to any specific genre, but did partner with numerous labels to introduce new artists to the airwaves. WEXP has featured live performances on its airwaves by many local bands, including New Jersey's own James Dalton, Noringo, and Rich Varevice. Appearing often on the station's live performance features also included bands such as Stereo Agency, the Matt Gauss Band, How It Ends, Nook the Crook, Forever I Burn, Fall River, Falling Down, Jason Ager and the Three Formed Fates, The Divining, and Dead Again. Among the more national notables, staff at WEXP live have also interviewed the members of Leftover Salmon, Rockapella, Killswitch Engage, Cipher and StereoTytans, among others, to promote each of their respective Philadelphia tour stops in the region. Also, comedian Dane Cook was connected for another interview by phone during one of the station's recorded segments to promote his live tour.

There are also a series of call-in and campus news/discussion shows that promote campus interactivity through the telephone, particularly during the late evening hours. From 2000 to 2009, WEXP students have broadcast live NCAA sporting events featuring La Salle University in football (discontinued), men's and women's soccer, men's and women's basketball, and baseball, promoting an interest in play-by-play announcing, and producing remote radio broadcasts. The longest running shows on WEXP were Steel Cage Radio (1999–2005) and Needle to the Groove with DJ Somavilla and DJ Helix (2000–2006). The other long running shows on the station include one which was known all around the metalhead community as "Red Fades to Black." Another tradition of college radio that has continued to grow over the years was the annual "WEXP Picnic," which was rebranded as "WEXPfest" in 2005 and then became "WEXP Anniversary Show" in 2020 and 2023. In 2023, WEXP planned its 50th-anniversary live reunion show, which could call for as many as 100 attendees from all different parts of the country via a live Twitter spaces venue, as well as the in person attendance for another 15 or several more.

During the period of 2002–2016, WEXP experienced rapid growth in its audience reach, leveraging its move from AM carrier current to exclusively on Live365.com in late 2002. The station quickly exceeded capacity on its introductory Live365 account and moved onto a dedicated server on campus the following year (2003). During that time period, WEXP also received a significant contribution from the student activity fund to renovate the station, install all new soundboard equipment, and invest in portable telephonic access. The portable technology enabled the sports department to begin hosting its full slate of remote sports broadcasts for men's and women's soccer, football, men's and women's basketball, and baseball, straight from the middle of the action for both home and select away games. Prior to that, WEXP's live sports coverage had been quite limited, and most of the "interview" and call-in shows had to be recorded in advance. But with this infusion of new services, WEXP's quality improved dramatically.

In order to build on the success of the rebranding as an internet-only station, WEXP finally abandoned all investment in its very dated "carrier current" technology (530 AM) which had been until then limited anyway to just a few of the oldest dorms on campus, or "CAJH" as they were then known (St. Cassian, St. Albert, St. Jerome, St. Hilary). The obsolete AM signal had been only spotty in some areas which the electrical system was still linked to the studio by way of its original electrical wiring. Besides that, very few students even still carried AM radios to campus except in their vehicles.

WEXP's internet accessibility made continued strides by becoming compatible with the TuneIn app to address the sudden cultural shift on college campuses from portable laptops over to tablet computers and smartphones which by then already had been occurring rapidly. In thus manner, WEXP La Salle Radio had its first broadcast reach a passenger airplane in 2005 via cabin wifi, according to reports on Twitter at the time. In the interim, WEXP also increased its advertising by showing the daily broadcast schedule on the students' mylasalle portal, attempting to expand impressions to anyone on campus by every means possible.

== Awards ==
In May 2006, the station won an award for Excellence in Broadcasting, from the Pennsylvania Association of Broadcasters. Play-by-play broadcaster Adam Bagni, color commentator Mike Petty, and sideline reporter Andrew Neumann were the individuals honored based on their work at WEXP. The station won in the category of Best Coverage of a Local Sporting Event: Major Market for a January 21, 2006 NCAA basketball game between La Salle and Saint Joseph's University. The award was also split with Merrill Reese and Mike Quick of Free FM (WYSP) for their coverage of the Philadelphia Eagles American football team.

On April 13, 2007, WEXP successfully broke the Guinness World Record for "Longest Radio Quiz", which was previously set at 30 hours.

== 2005-2020 ==
Subsequent to 2005, after many years of petitioning, WEXP was finally allowed to temporarily return to the airwaves, boosting its OTA signal strength to the entire campus and broader surrounding community. Based on a consulting engineer's recommendation, the acting station GM at the time, Adam Bagni, '06, was able to obtain permission to use a low-power FCC-exempt signal on 1600 AM from 20th Street all the way to Broad Street. Unfortunately, the modest improvement of the signal in 2005 did not boost ratings as much as anticipated or move the needle at all in terms of recruiting new members, though it did enable the radio station to temporarily enjoy legitimate "full campus coverage" as it finally could be listened to all along the campus perimeter shuttle bus route, as well as in any cars brought onto campus, as well as in the Blue and Gold Dining Commons and Treetops Dining facility, the Adirondack chair-laden Hansen quad, and numerous other campus hangouts. The period of 2005-2006 was undoubtedly the "high water" mark for the station. At that time the station was even able to broadcast a full slate of shows for 60 hours per week. The schedule ran for 12 hours on weekdays from 10 a.m. to 10 p.m., then aired reruns of the same day's shows overnights from 10 p.m. to 10 a.m. On weekends, the station played a commercial free music soundboard with rock/pop and R&B influences, with intermittent late breaking news and live sports updates cutting in on some occasions. On the "Explorer Game Days," the sports department continued to preempt the existing show schedule with its live broadcasts of five different La Salle sports teams.

Citing lack of student interest, and a difficulty keeping the equipment up to date, WEXP experienced a gradual decline in ratings and participation. A breakdown of the internet streaming technology, which was soon starting to become antiquated because of lack of much ingenuity on site in that regard, required the station's executive board to take some time off to reevaluate WEXP's role in the more "app friendly" world in which internet radio had been marginalized mostly by individual streaming services like Spotify and Pandora. The brief reboot as a mere Pandora streaming copycat with no live talent whatsoever and no Station ID liners to even attempt to differentiate the decrepit WEXP from other failing "jukebox radio stations" around the world like it ultimately did not last for more than a year, as WEXP became dormant again in 2020, ending a 15-year run as one of the Philadelphia area's most prominent student-run radio stations.
