= Sarah Fisher (disambiguation) =

Sarah Fisher (born 1980) is an American racecar driver.

Sarah or Sara Fisher may also refer to:

- Sarah Fisher (bishop), American Episcopal bishop
- Sarah Logan Fisher (1751–1796), Quaker Loyalist
- Sarah Egerton (actress), née Fisher (1782–1847), English actress
- Sarah Fisher, Canadian actress known for Degrassi: The Next Generation
- Sara Fisher, founder of 12 Peers Theater

== In fiction ==
- Sarah Fisher, a character from Tom Clancy's Splinter Cell
- Sara Fisher, a character from "The Fifth Man" episode of Numb3rs
- Sara Fisher, a character in the Justin Cronin novel The Passage
