= Tom Curley =

American journalist

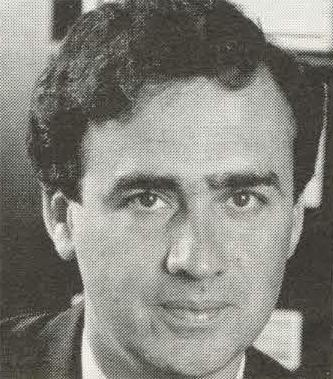
- Curley in November 1986
- Born: July 6, 1948 (age 78); Easton, Pennsylvania, U.S.
- Education: La Salle University (BA); Rochester Institute of Technology (MBA)
- Known for: President of Associated Press (2003–2012)

Thomas Curley (born July 6, 1948) is an American businessman and journalist who served as president of Associated Press, the world's largest news organization. He retired in 2012.

== Early life and education ==
Curley was born on July 6, 1948, in Easton, Pennsylvania. At age 15, he started writing for The Express-Times, a daily newspaper in Easton.

He earned a Bachelor of Arts degree in political science from La Salle University, where he served as editor in chief of the student newspaper, The Collegian, and was a member of Sigma Phi Lambda fraternity. He earned an MBA from Rochester Institute of Technology. In 1994, Curley received an Honorary Doctorate from his undergraduate alma mater.

== Career ==
In 1972, he worked as an editor for the Rochester Times-Union. He became director of information for Gannett Company, Inc. in 1976. In 1979, he was one of the original news staffers that founded USA Today. In 1982, he became the editor of The Bulletin, and in 1983, publisher of The Courier-News. He served as the president and publisher of USA Today from 1991 to 2003. In 1998, he became senior vice president of Gannett. Curley served as the President of the Associated Press from June 2003 until 2012.

He is a trustee of the Ronald McDonald House Charities. He also serves on the executive board of the Ad Council, and he is the former chairman of the American Advertising Federation's Advertising Hall of Fame.
