= Joseph DeFelice =

American government administrator and politician

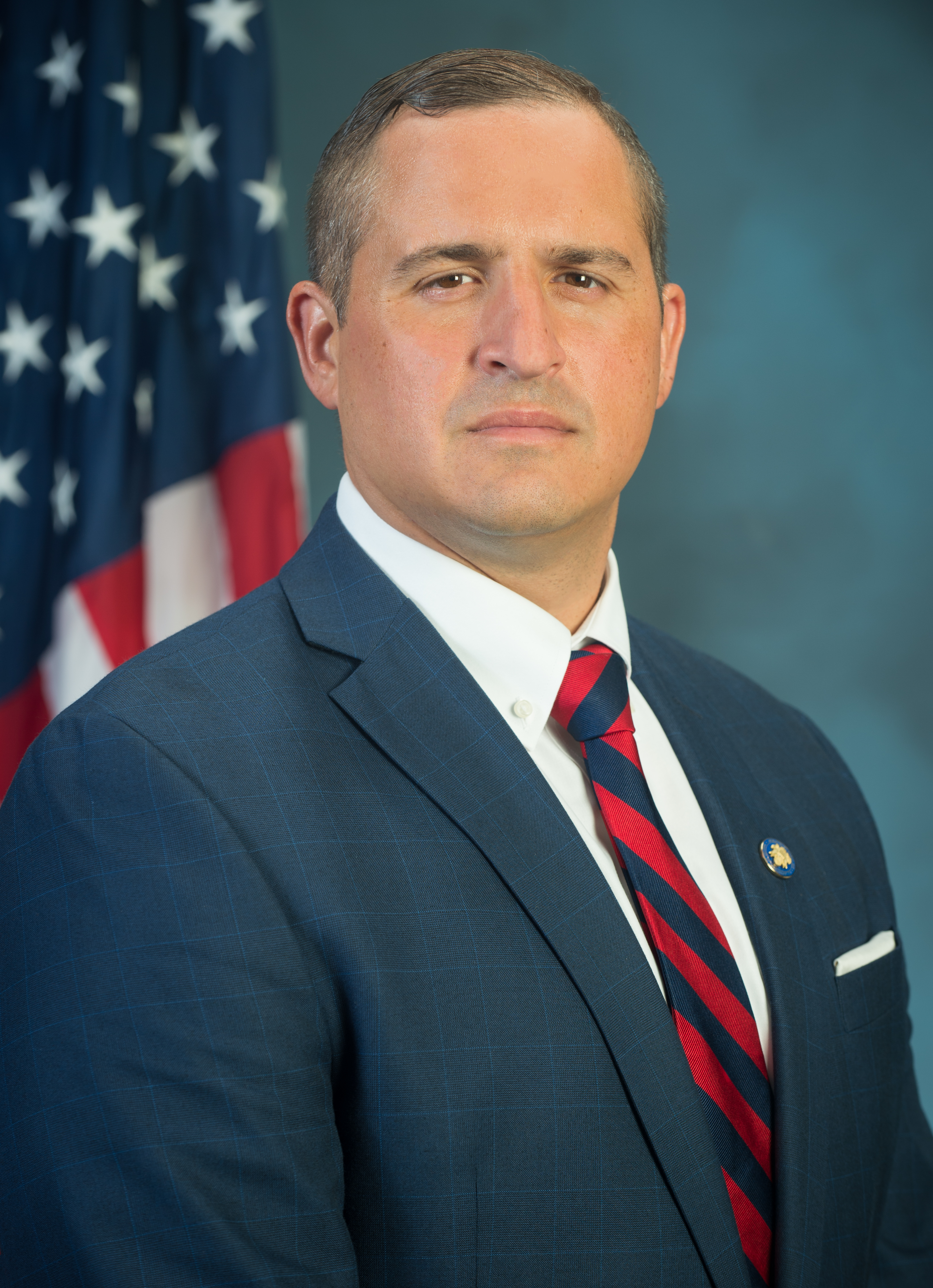

Regional Administrator of Housing and Urban Development Mid-Atlantic region
- In office June 5, 2017 – January 20, 2021
- President: Donald Trump

Personal details
- Born: Philadelphia, Pennsylvania, U.S.
- Party: Republican
- Education: La Salle University (BA); Widener University (JD)

Joseph DeFelice is the current Assistant Deputy Secretary and Regional Administrator of the U.S. Department of Housing and Urban Development, Mid-Atlantic region. He previously served as Acting Assistant Deputy Secretary and Regional Administrator in the first Trump Administration. He was previously the head of the Philadelphia Republican Party, playing a role in Trump's popularity in the Northeast region of Philadelphia. In 2022, he worked as Of Counsel for Goldstein Law Partners.

== Early life ==
DeFelice attended Father Judge High School in Northeast Philadelphia before earning his Bachelor's of Arts in Political Science from La Salle University, later earning his Juris Doctor degree from Widener University Delaware Law School. While practicing law, DeFelice served as chairman of the Mayfair Community Development Corporation and president of the Mayfair Civic Association before becoming Chairman of the Philadelphia Republican Party. He was also an adjunct professor at La Salle University and Widener University.

== Chair of Philadelphia GOP ==
DeFelice became chair of the Philadelphia Republican City Committee in February 2016. Prior to his chairmanship, he was the executive director of the local party since 2013.

=== Role in 2016 elections ===
He was chair of the Philadelphia GOP, when the party won successes in the 2016 United States elections in the area. Trump outperformed in the city the previous Republican candidate, Mitt Romney by 2 percentage points. “Among the city’s wards that are more than 75 percent African American,” the Washington Post reported, “Trump got about 1,300 — or 31 percent — more votes than Romney.”

In the 2016 elections, Republican state representative Martina White fended off a Barack Obama-endorsed opponent in her Northeast Philadelphia district, where Democrats outnumber Republicans two-to-one, was able to defeat her opponent, continuing her tenure in the state house for additional years.

== Housing and Urban Development ==
DeFelice stepped down from his Philadelphia GOP chairman position in April 2017 to fill the post of regional administrator of the Mid-Atlantic region in the U.S. Department of Housing and Urban Development under head administrator Ben Carson. The region covers Delaware, Maryland, Pennsylvania, Virginia, Washington, D.C. and West Virginia.
