= The Collegian (La Salle University) =

Student newspaper for La Salle University

- Nameplate for the Collegian from 2011-2016
- Type: Weekly student newspaper
- Format: Compact
- Owner(s): La Salle University
- Founder(s): Marcel Sussman & Leon J. Perelman
- Publisher: La Salle University
- Editor-in-chief: Maya Martin
- Founded: March 16, 1931
- Headquarters: Philadelphia, Pennsylvania, USA
- Circulation: 600
- Website: thelasallecollegian.com

The Collegian, which published its first issue on March 16, 1931, is the on-campus newspaper for La Salle University, Philadelphia, Pennsylvania. It is published weekly throughout the school year. The newspaper is written, edited and produced by students of La Salle University, underneath a faculty adviser.

== History ==
Founded in March 1931, the Collegian was La Salle's third student newspaper, following two short lived publications in the late 19th century, both called The Advance. The Collegian was initially four pages in length, and generally took a more conservative and isolationist editorial stance, though the latter was dropped after the attack on Pearl Harbor. Unlike many student organizations at La Salle which ceased to function due to the war, such as the football team and The Colophon literary magazine, the Collegian continued publication.

In the post-war years, the Collegian prospered, beginning weekly publication and going from a record low of seven issues in the 1945–1946 academic year to a record high of 32 in the 1950–1951 year. During the 1960s, the Collegian was used by La Salle students to give voice to a number of causes including the honoring of La Salle's first president, Brother Teliow and the anti-ROTC movement at La Salle.

In 2011, La Salle was under fire because it censored a Collegian story about a professor's hiring of strippers to perform at a lecture. "We didn't publish a story because we weren't allowed," a Collegian editorial wrote. University administrators forbade Collegian leaders to write a front-page story on the topic, so they put in on the underside. So, the front of the newspaper was left blank and just said "See below the fold," where there was a story of the stripper scandal below the blank white front page.

In the 2016–2017 school year, the Collegian changed its header from a dark blue to a classic white. The paper also followed suit with newspapers around the country in publishing an endorsement of Hillary Clinton in the 2016 Presidential Election.

== Collegian Award ==
From 1949 to 1969 and from then intermittently afterwards, the Collegian presented the "Collegian Award" for public service in journalism to a professional journalist at its annual banquet. Recipients of the award include Ed Sullivan (1949), Bob Considine (1951), Red Smith (1952), Edward R. Murrow (1953), David Lawrence (1955), Jim Bishop (1956), Chet Huntley (1958), Walter Cronkite (1960), David Brinkley (1961), James Reston (1962), Charles Collingwood (1963), Art Buchwald (1964), Nancy Dickerson (1965), Charles M. Schulz (1966) and Tom Curley (2013).
