= Colleen Hanycz =

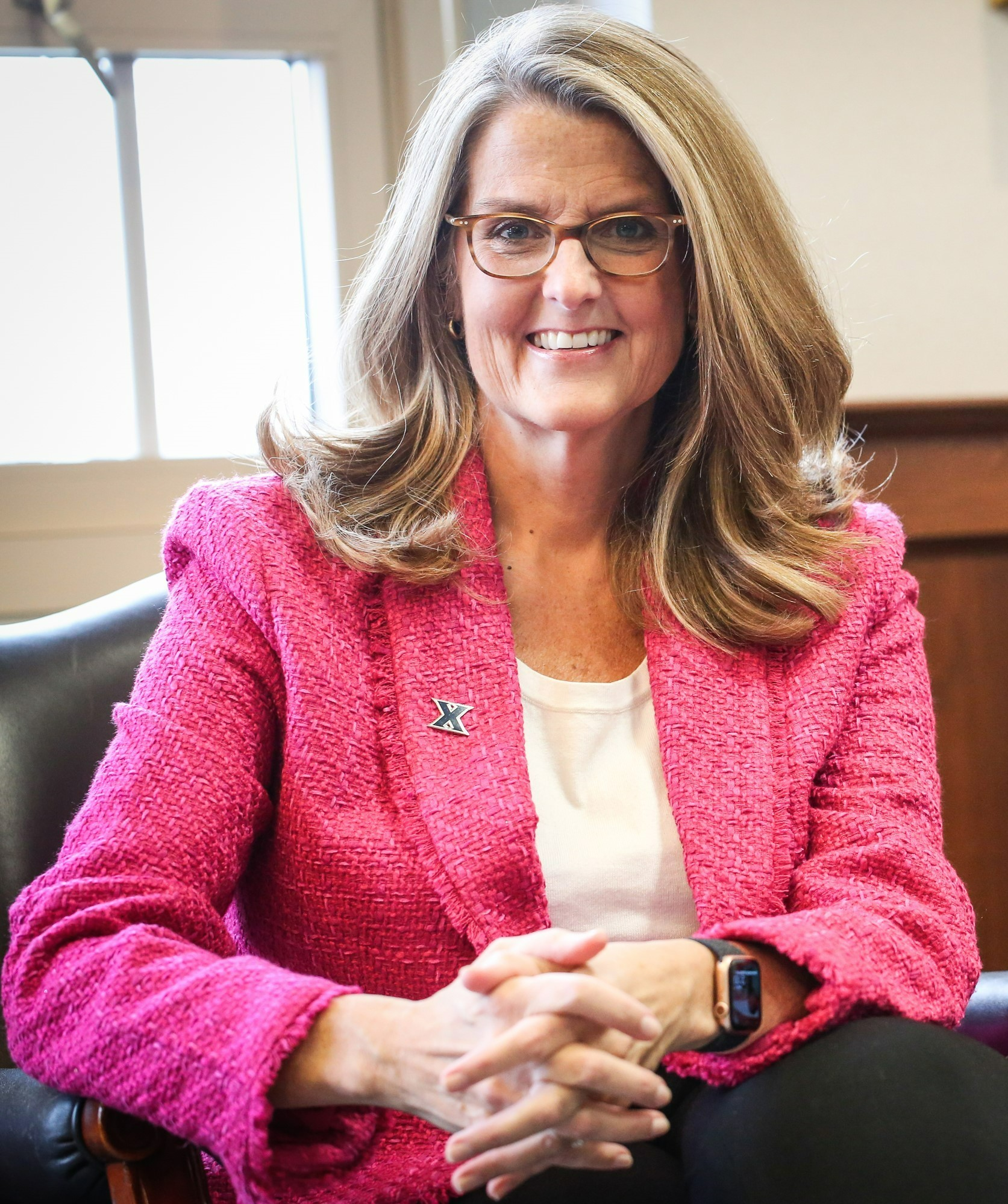

35th President of Xavier University
- Incumbent
- Assumed office July 1, 2021
- Preceded by: Michael J. Graham

29th President of La Salle University
- In office July 1, 2015 – June 30, 2021
- Preceded by: Michael McGinniss
- Succeeded by: Daniel J. Allen

Principal of Brescia University College
- In office 2008–2015
- Preceded by: Theresa Topic
- Succeeded by: Susan Mumm

Personal details
- Education: University of Toronto (BA); Dalhousie University (JD); York University (LLM, PhD)

Colleen M. Hanycz is a Canadian academic who is currently the president of Xavier University. She served as principal of Brescia University College from 2008 to 2015 and president of La Salle University from 2015 to 2021. On January 11, 2021, it was announced that Hanycz would become the 35th President of Xavier University starting July 1, 2021. She was the second lay person principal in the history of Brescia, a Catholic school and Canada's only women's university, and she was the first woman and layperson to serve as president at La Salle and Xavier.

== Early life and education ==
Hanycz earned a Bachelor of Arts in history from St. Michael's College at the University of Toronto. She completed her J.D. at Dalhousie University. Hanycz earned her LL.M and Ph.D. at Osgoode Hall Law School while working as a securities litigator in Toronto, Ontario, Canada and then as assistant dean and associate professor of law at Osgoode.

== Brescia University College ==
In 2008, Hanycz left her teaching and assistant dean position at Osgoode to become Brescia's Principal, succeeding Theresa Topic. At Brescia, Hanycz led a strategic plan that resulted in an increase in Brescia's enrollment, student, faculty, and staff retention, and consolidation of academic programs. While she served as president, she taught in Brescia's women's leadership program and continued in the LL.M. program at Osgoode Hall Law School in Toronto. Under her leadership, Brescia saw a 60 percent jump in enrollment to 1,500 full-time equivalent students.

== La Salle University ==
In 2015, Hanycz became the first female university president of La Salle University. She was appointed to La Salle at a transitional time, inheriting a large deficit and lower enrollment. In 2015, La Salle had a freshman class of 725, which was below its target. The 2015 freshman class was about 16 percent smaller than the 2014 freshman class of 860.

University Affairs held an exit interview for Hanycz after the announcement was made that she would be leaving Brescia for La Salle in April 2015. Hanycz stated, "I think La Salle is facing some of the same challenges that Brescia was facing in 2008. I'd like to think that I have some value to add to that based on what I have learned." Hanycz led similar consolidating initiatives at La Salle that she underwent with Brescia. La Salle downsized its student life programs and consolidate academic programs at the university, something known as "program prioritization," which was controversial for students, staff, and faculty members.

Hanycz hoped that cuts and downsizing would lead to important cost-saving and cost-prioritizing measures. Under Hanycz, La Salle University tuition rates decreased by 29 percent, citing college affordability in her home country of Canada. However, a cost analysis suggested students would only save between $1,000 to $1,500 due to cuts in financial assistance. In 2020, La Salle University’s debt was downgraded by Fitch Ratings due to “... continued pressure on La Salle's enrollment, which has been further exacerbated by the coronavirus pandemic, competitive operating landscape, and reliance on an unsustainable level of endowment support in the intermediate term.” Despite the budget concerns, Hanycz’s compensation increased from $457,479 in 2019 to $497,214 in 2020.

== Xavier University ==
Hanycz was appointed the 35th President of Xavier University on July 1, 2021, the first layperson and first woman President since the university's founding.
