= College Hall (La Salle University) =

Collegiate building in Philadelphia, Pennsylvania

Coordinates: 40.039055°N 75.153832°W

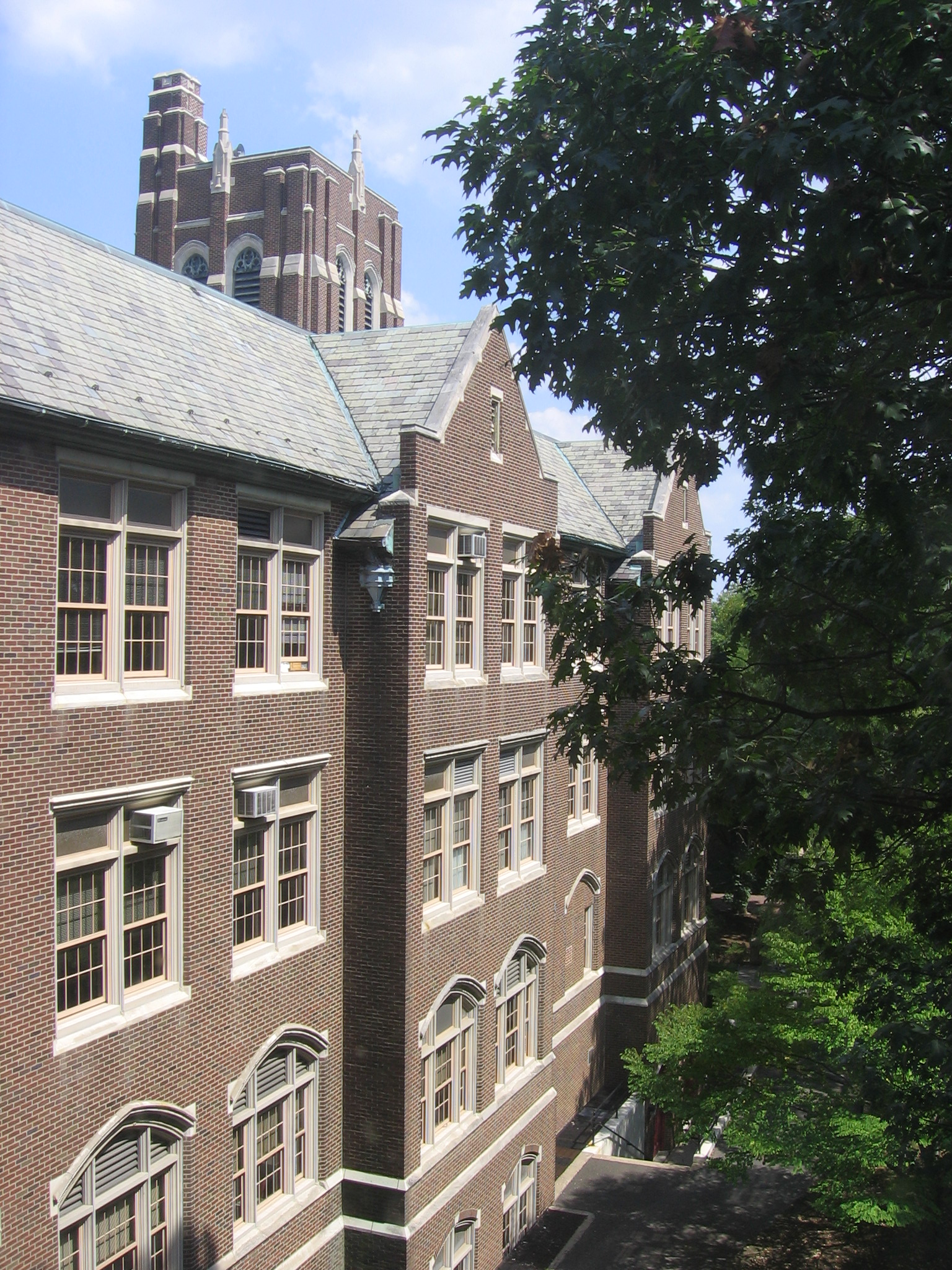
- College Hall's south façade, September 2010

General information
- Type: Collegiate building
- Architectural style: Collegiate Gothic
- Location: 1900 W. Olney Avenue, Philadelphia
- Construction started: 1928
- Completed: 1930
- Owner: La Salle University

Technical details
- Floor count: 4

Design and construction
- Main contractor: John McShain

College Hall is the original academic building on La Salle University's campus. It is located at 1900 W. Olney Avenue in Philadelphia, Pennsylvania. College Hall presently houses the Schools of Business and Business Administration, the Campus Ministry Center and the La Salle University Archives. Attached to the Christian Brother's Residence, it is on La Salle's main quadrangle.

== History ==
=== Construction ===
La Salle College, then located on Broad Street near the interaction with Stiles Street, purchased its present campus at 20th Street and Olney Avenue in 1926. Impressed with St. Joseph's College's new Barbelin Hall, La Salle contracted builder and alumnus John McShain to construct the buildings for its new campus. Construction of College Hall, along with the Christian Brother's Residence and Wister Hall began in 1928, and the building was complete by September 1929, when La Salle College High School temporarily moved into the building. La Salle College moved into the building in March 1930, and it was dedicated by Cardinal Dougherty on 24 May 1931.

Due to a lack of funds, the building was not completed as originally planned. Present-day College Hall had been intended to house La Salle College High School, and an un-built east wing of the building would have contained the college itself. Attached to this planned wing, and located roughly where McShain Hall was (McShain was demolished in 2016), would have been a large auditorium. La Salle had planned to eventually construct this un-built wing, resulting in east wall of the building being "temporary" plaster instead of brick.

Initially, the lack of funds also resulted in the first and fourth floors also being incomplete. On the third floor, the college housed student athletes who lived too far to commute to school. They lived in what had been intended to be classrooms, and slept twelve to a room. This arrangement continued throughout the 1930s and into the 1940s.

=== After Completion ===
On the building's first floor was an auditorium where dances, plays, exams, assemblies, and masses were held. On 11 February 1958, then-Senator John F. Kennedy spoke in this auditorium upon receiving an honorary degree from La Salle. This auditorium was converted into the De La Salle Chapel in 1965.

Science labs were located on each of the upper floors until the 1980s. The second floor housed a physics lab, the third a biology and an anatomy lab, and the fourth a chemistry lab.

From the 1930s until the late 1950s, La Salle's library was located on the second floor facing the quadrangle. Upon the completion of the David Leo Lawrence Building, the books were moved there, and the space was converted into classrooms.

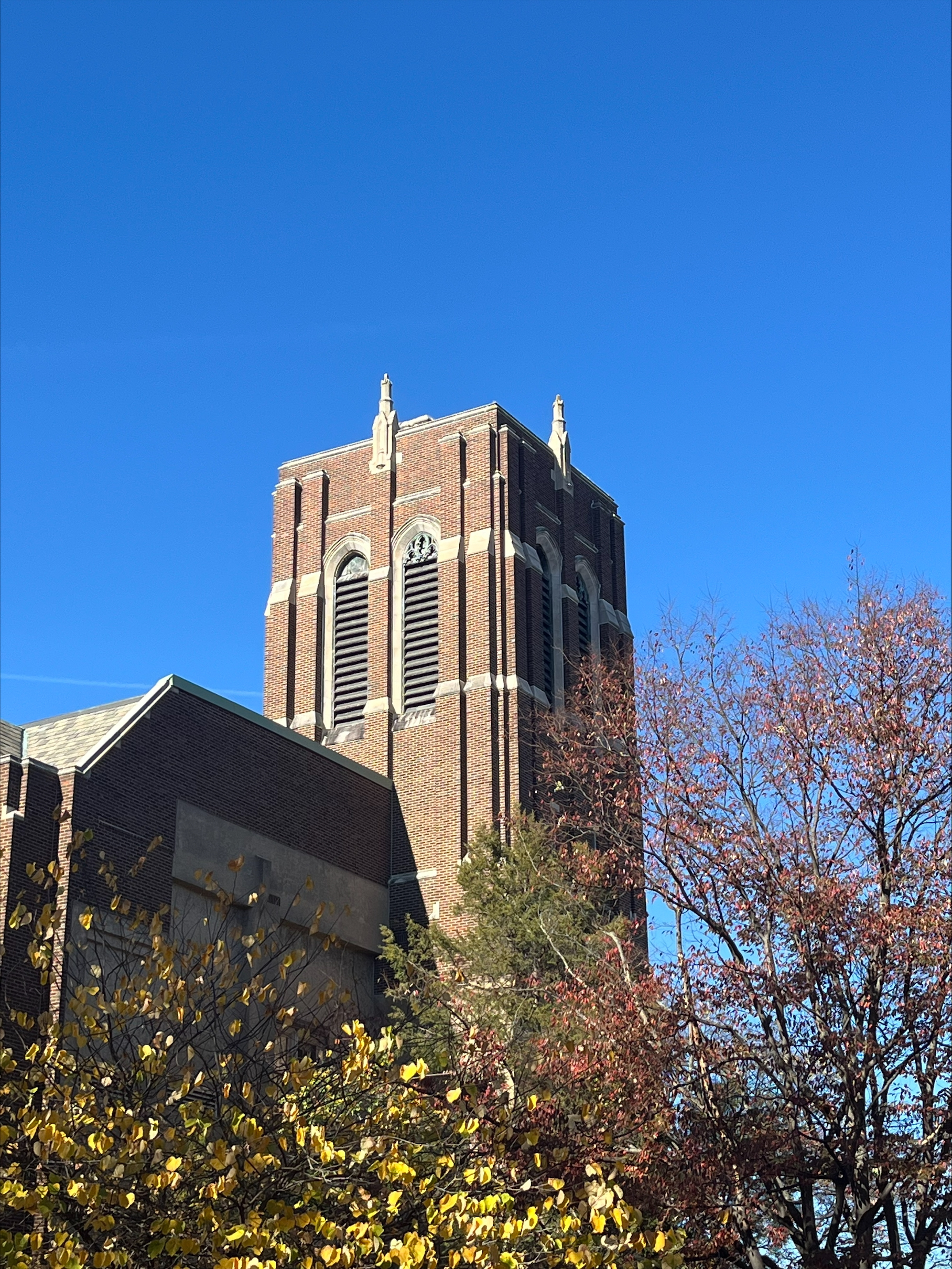
College Hall Bell Tower

==== Bell Tower ====
In 1958, student John Veen started a campaign to bring an electronic carillon to the College Hall tower. In 1982 the original carillon was replaced with a new one. In 2013-15, a computerized bell system was installed. Today the bell chimes every quarter hour, and at noon a hymn plays.

==== Student protest ====
In April 1969 College Hall was the location of a sit-in conducted by about two to three hundred students. The students were protesting La Salle's policy that mandated that all freshmen and sophomores participate in La Salle's ROTC program. The sit-in lasted four days, with students working in shifts. After the fourth day, the college decided to accept the students' demands, and ended its mandatory ROTC policy.

=== Renovations ===
Starting in the 1980s, College Hall underwent significant renovations. The mail room, located on the first floor, was moved to McCarthy Stadium, and the School of Business Administration took over most of the classrooms.

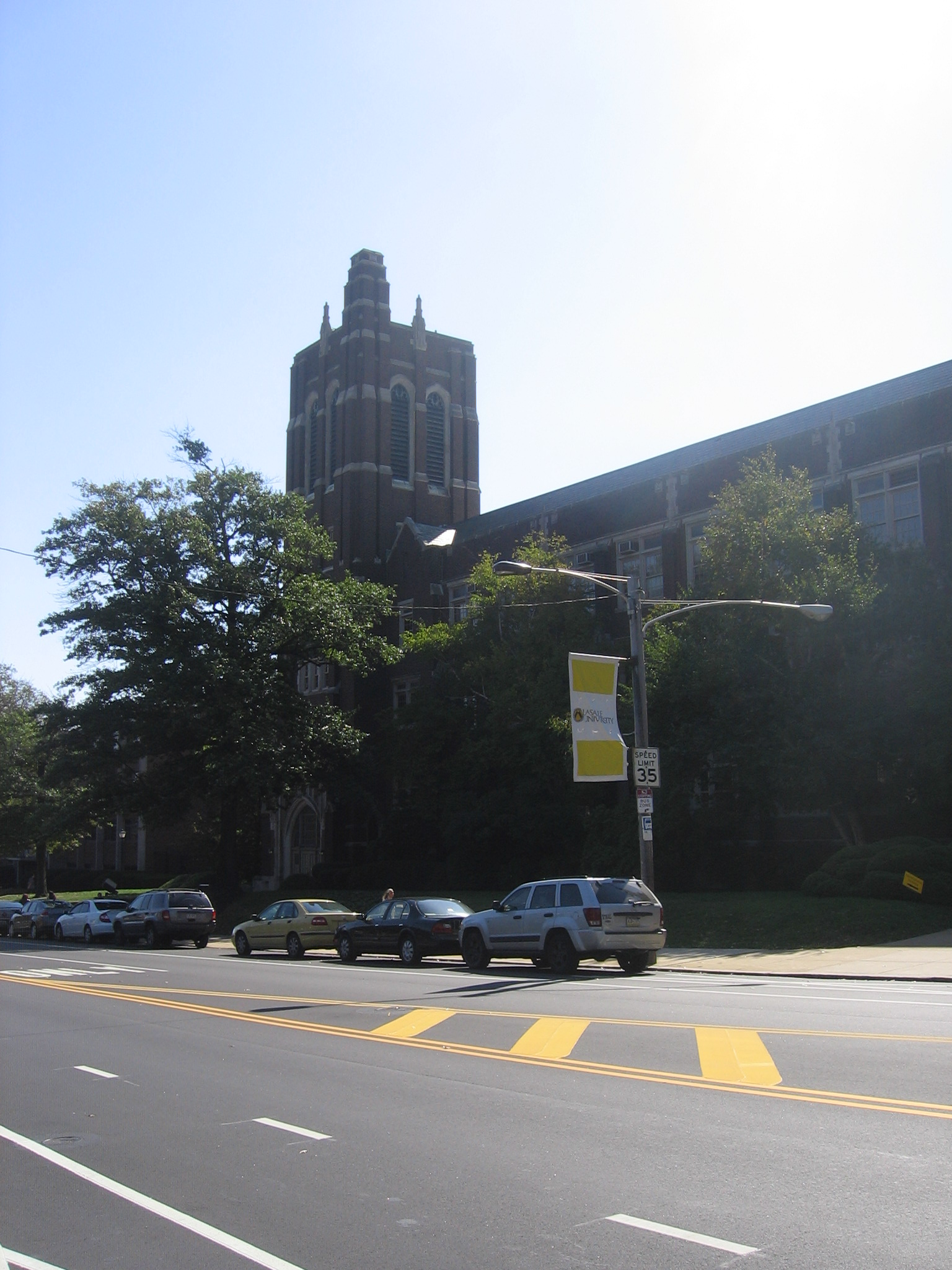
North elevation of College Hall.
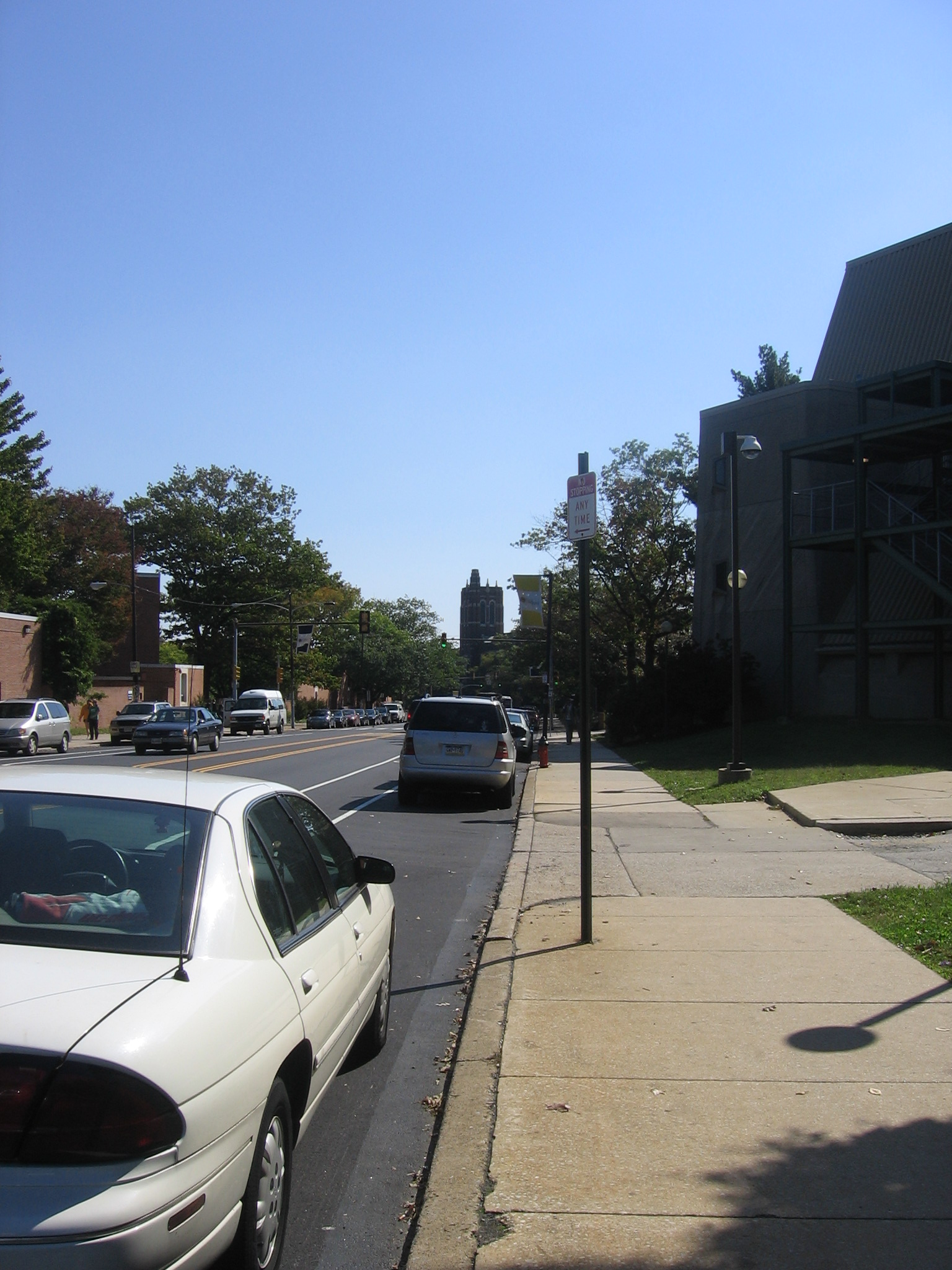
College Hall
