= Sarah Logan Fisher =

Diarist 1751–1796

Sarah Logan Fisher (1751–1796) was a Quaker Loyalist who wrote a diary about her experiences during the American Revolution. Fisher documented her pro-British views, as well as domestic life and the religious and spiritual contemplations of 18th century women in her community. Her diary, A Diary of Trifling Occurrences, was published in 1958. It became a source of information about the lives of residents of Philadelphia as they anticipated and experienced the Revolution.

== Early life and family ==
Sarah Logan was born to William Logan and Hannah Emlen Logan in 1751. Her parents were prominent Pennsylvania Quakers.

Sarah married businessman Thomas Fisher in 1772. Thomas ran a shipping business with his brothers. Their marriage brought together two of the most influential families in the Philadelphia area.

The couple had at least five children, Joshua Fisher (1775–1806), Hannah Logan Smith (1777–1846), William Logan Fisher (1781–1862), James Logan Fisher (1778–1814), and Esther Fisher (1789–1849).

== Diary ==
In August 1777, Sarah's husband, Thomas, visited her family estate of Stenton and discovered that American officials were lodging there. George Washington lodged at the property later in the same month. Sarah feared that the American soldiers would vandalize Stenton. It is at this time when she starts a diary to document her life and events.

Sarah's diary had a clear pro-British sentiment. In it, she also documented the prices of goods like spices, sugar, and tea, all things that were being taxed by Britain through legislation like the Sugar Act.

In September 1777, Thomas Fisher was arrested for being "suspected of Toryism" and sent with other Quakers to Winchester, Virginia where he was held for eight months. This was documented in Sarah's diary.

Sarah and Thomas participated in the refusal of using the continental money. This branded them as "enemies of the country" and prohibited them from trade. Fisher wrote about the restrictions to the "disaffected community" as well as the acts of radical leaders.

== Death and legacy ==
Sarah Logan Fisher died in 1796 leaving behind her husband and five children.

Her diary was published as A Diary of Trifling Occurrences in 1958. It has given historians a source of information about the lives of Quaker women during the 18th century.
