= La Salle University =

Catholic university in Philadelphia, Pennsylvania, US

- Former name: La Salle College (1863–1984)
- Motto: Virtus, Scientia (Latin)
- Motto in English: Virtue, Knowledge
- Type: Private university
- Established: 1863; 163 years ago
- Religious affiliation: Roman Catholic (Christian Brothers)
- Academic affiliations: IALU ACCU; NAICU
- Endowment: $64.7 million (2024)
- President: Daniel J. Allen
- Faculty: 373
- Students: 3,285 (Fall 2025)
- Undergraduates: 2,346 (Fall 2025)
- Postgraduates: 917 (Fall 2025)
- Location: Philadelphia, Pennsylvania, U.S. 40.03925°N 75.15325°W
- Campus: Urban, 130 acres (526,091.3 m^{2})
- Colors: Blue and gold
- Nickname: Explorers
- Sporting affiliations: NCAA Division I – Atlantic 10; Philadelphia Big 5; City 6; CWPA
- Mascot: The Explorer
- Website: www.lasalle.edu

La Salle University (/ləˈsæl/) is a private Catholic university in Philadelphia, Pennsylvania, United States. The university was founded in 1863 by the Institute of the Brothers of the Christian Schools and named for St. Jean-Baptiste de La Salle.

== History ==
=== 19th century ===
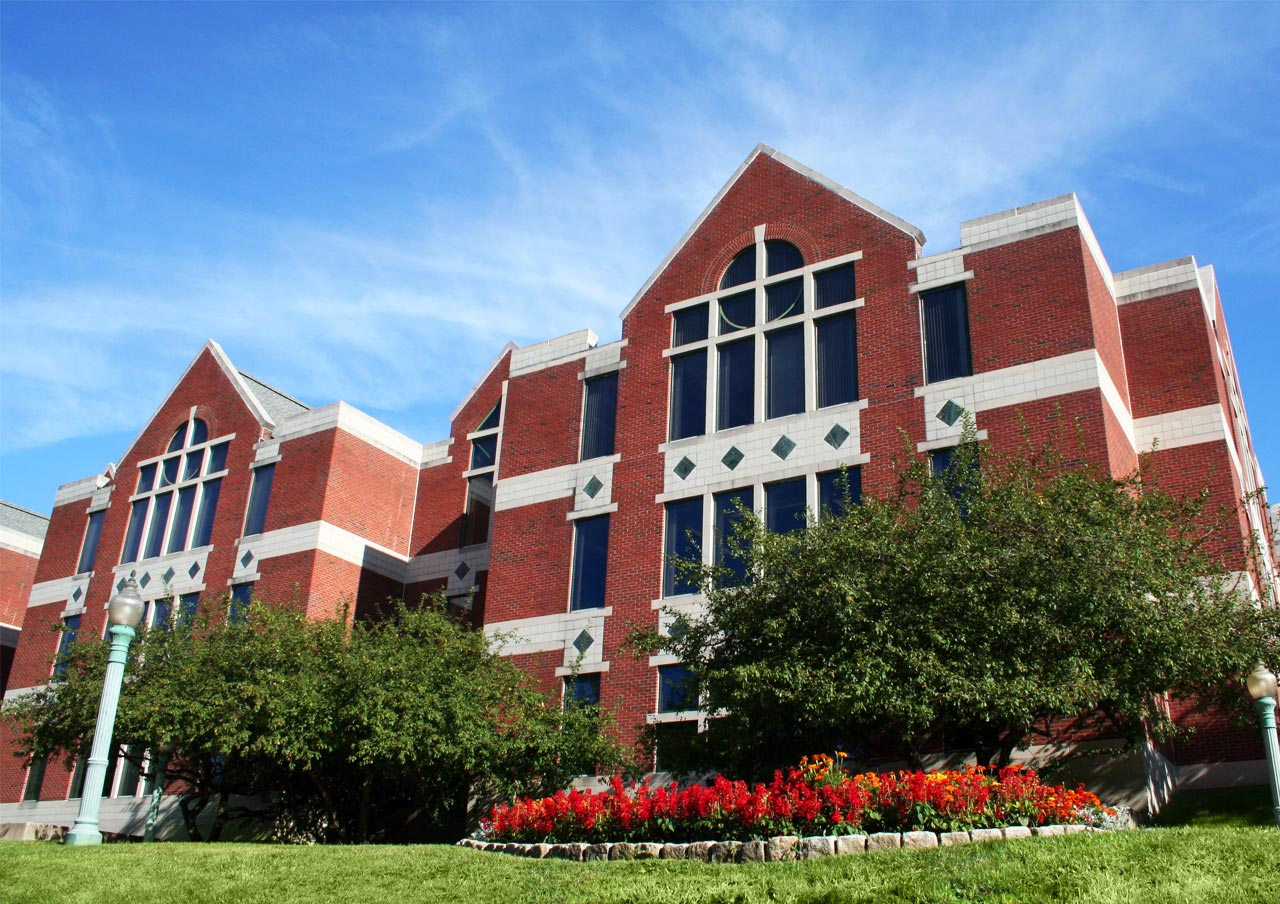
The campus of LaSalle University looking toward Connelly Library

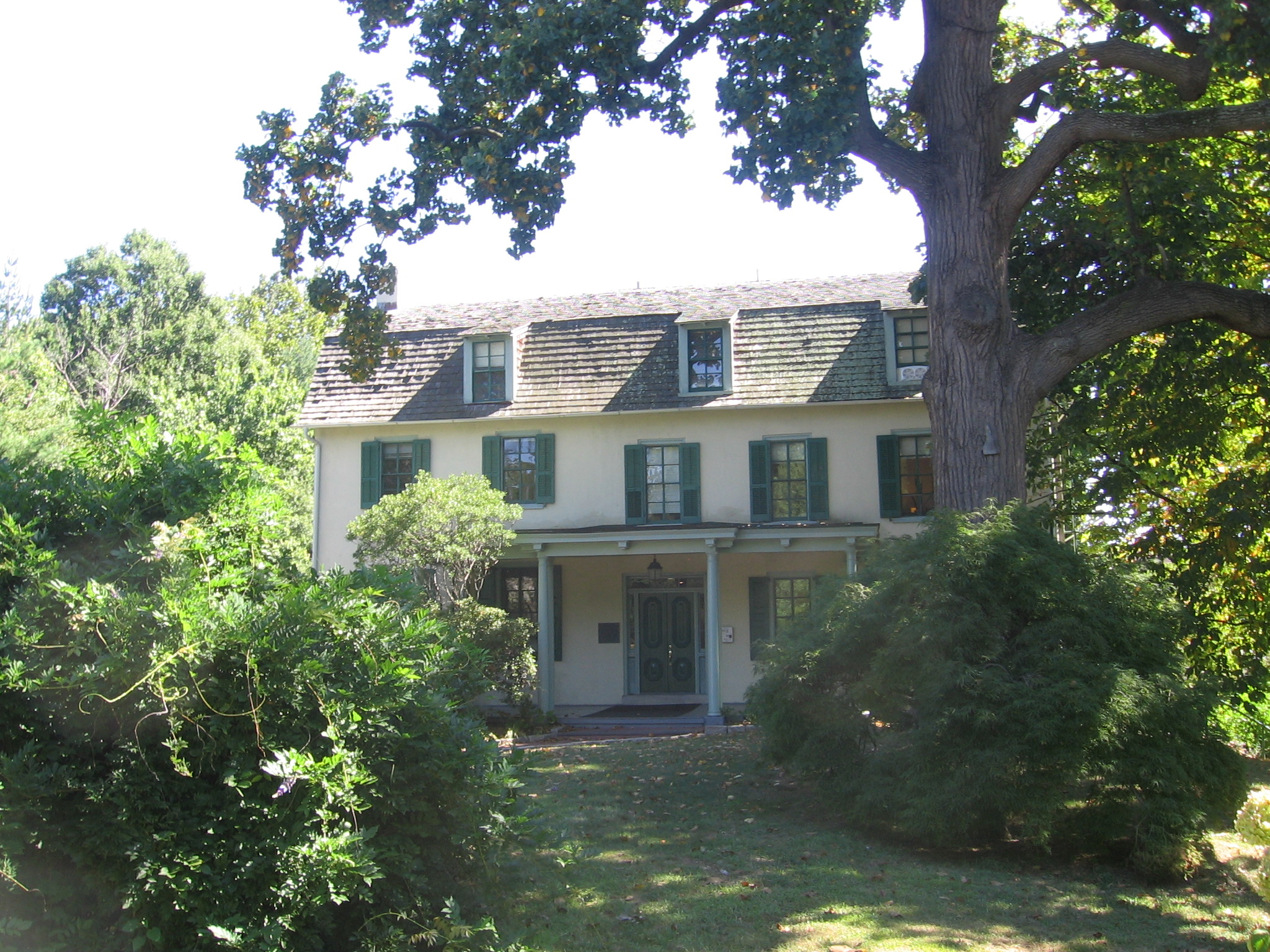
Peale House on Belfield, the former office of the La Salle president

La Salle College was founded in March 1863 as an all-male college by Brother Teliow and Archbishop James Wood of the Archdiocese of Philadelphia. It was first located at St. Michael's Parish on N. 2nd Street in the Olde Kensington section of Philadelphia. La Salle soon moved to the building vacated by St. Joseph's College at 1234 Filbert Street in Center City, Philadelphia. In 1886, due to the development of the Center City district, La Salle moved to a third location, the former mansion of Michael Bouvier, the great-great-grandfather of Jacqueline Kennedy Onassis, at 1240 North Broad Street.

=== 20th century ===
In 1930, due to space constraints, La Salle College moved to its current campus at the intersection of 20th Street and Olney Avenue in the Logan neighborhood of the city. The new location had a suburban feel with ample land, but was linked to the city by trolleys and the newly constructed Broad Street Subway. The 1930s proved to be a tumultuous decade for La Salle, which nearly went bankrupt after being unable to sell the 1240 North Broad Street property. The main academic building on campus, College Hall, was left unfinished due to a lack of funds, and the college nearly closed in the late 1930s. Its closure was prevented by a 75th anniversary fund drive in 1938, spearheaded by Philadelphia businessman John McCarthy. Funds raised from the drive also enabled La Salle to purchase a tract of land to the east of 19th Street, where Philadelphia had intended to build a city college.

During World War II, La Salle nearly closed again due to a lack of students, and the football team was disbanded due to a lack of players, but the college experienced a period of growth in the late 1940s. Several new buildings were constructed in the 1940s and 1950s, including a new library, student union, and a science building. It was also during this time that the first student residence halls were constructed at La Salle, mostly on land purchased from the former Belfield Country Club. Additional student housing was provided by purchasing or renting local homes, such as the house known as "The Mansion", on David and Logan Blain's Belfield Estate. During the 1960s, the high school section moved out due to a lack of space, after many years of sharing the same campus with the College.

In 1970, La Salle College admitted women to its regular classes, becoming a fully co-educational institution. A year later, La Salle opened Olney Hall (now known as Hayman Hall), (Note: 1900 West Olney Avenue Philadelphia) its main academic building. It also continued to expand its footprint throughout the 1970s and 1980s, buying land along Chew Avenue in the Germantown section of the city, along with the Belfield Estate in 1984, and to the south of main campus, the orphanage run by the Sisters of St. Basil the Great. In 1984, La Salle was granted university status.

=== 21st century ===
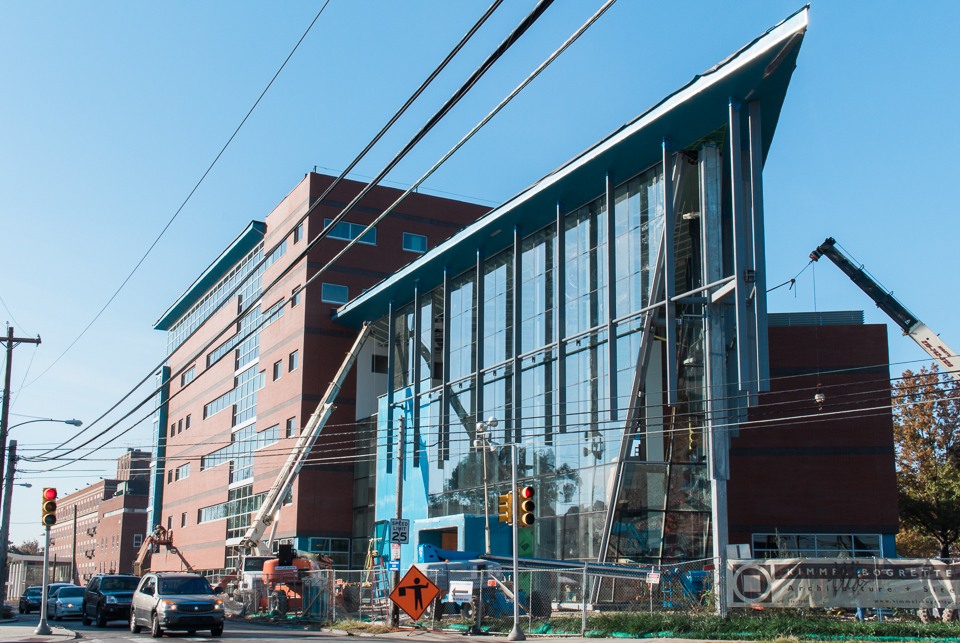
Founder's Hall from the corner of Wister and Chew streets in 2015

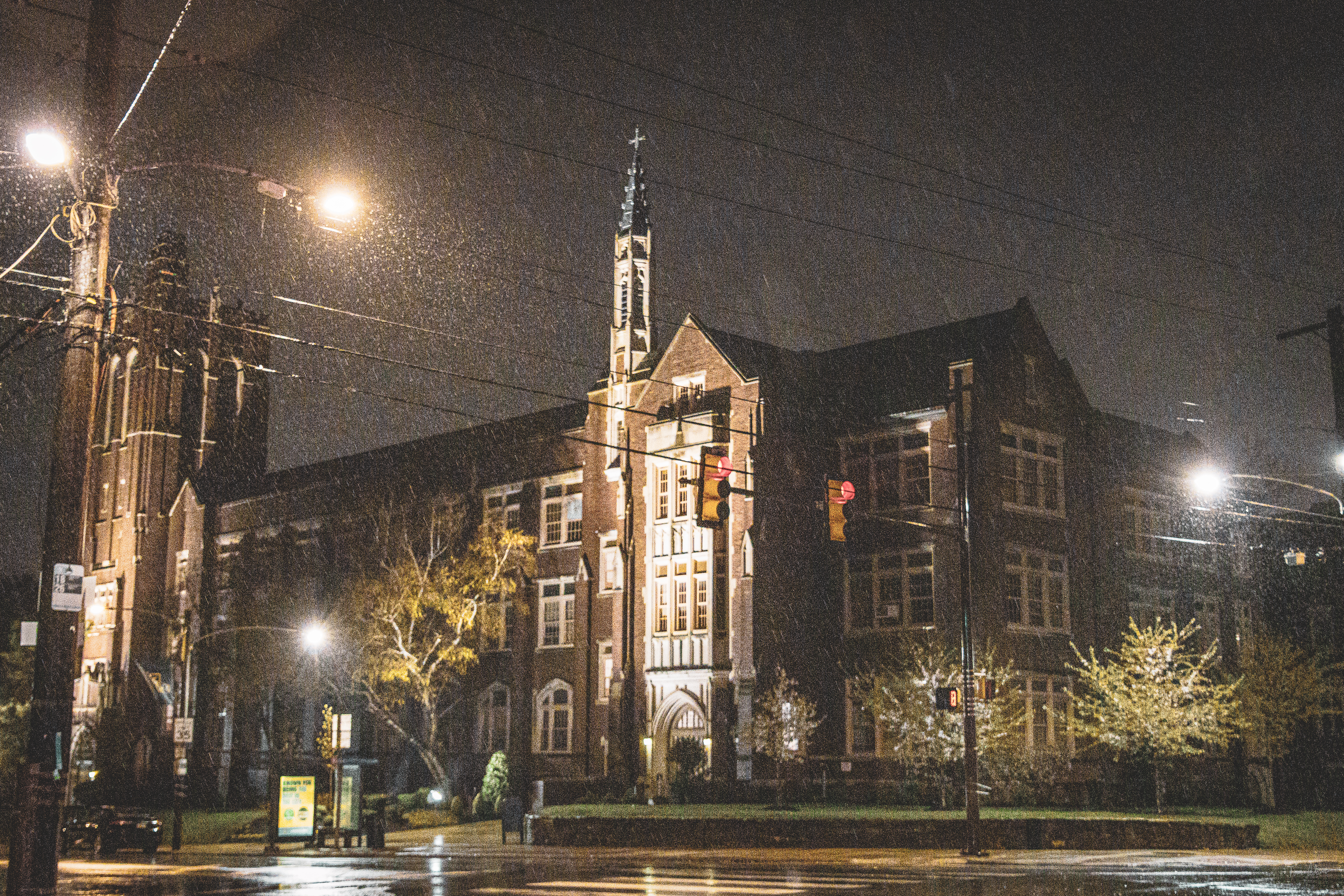
College Hall from the corners of 20th & Olney

In the fall of 2005, the first phase of a $26 million La Salle master plan was completed with the construction of the Tree Tops Cafe (dining hall) and St. Basil Court (residence hall). St. Basil's houses approximately 430 students. Three of the building's wings feature "suites", in which four students share two bedrooms and one bathroom. The fourth wing has traditional rooms that house two students each, with communal bathrooms. Facilities include lounges, study rooms, and special purpose rooms.

A $2.5 million athletic field renovation was completed in the fall of 2006.

In May 2007, the university purchased the adjacent Germantown Hospital for $10 million. The 24 acres (97,000 m^{2}) acquired became "West Campus", increasing overall campus size by 25 percent. In the fall of 2008, La Salle opened The Shoppes at La Salle, a $15 million shopping center and supermarket complex across the street from the hospital, formerly home to the university's softball field and other recreational areas. The Shoppes at La Salle and the addition of The Fresh Grocer ended a decades-long food desert in Germantown.

The renovated Holroyd Science Center was completed in the fall of 2009 and a new business school opened on West Campus in January 2016.

In the summer of 2016, McShain Hall in the middle of campus was torn down and replaced with more green space. The new quad was named after its donor, the Hansen family.

A satellite campus and conference center in Newtown, Bucks County, Pennsylvania, the La Salle University Bucks County Center, offers graduate courses in various disciplines, undergraduate courses in nursing, and continuing education courses. The conference center comprises fifteen instructional rooms with seating capacity ranging from 20 to 40, along with four computer labs with 100 workstations. La Salle also offers M.B.A. and Clinical-Counseling Psychology Master of Arts classes at the Plymouth Meeting Metroplex Corporate Center in Montgomery County, Pennsylvania.

In October 2015, La Salle inaugurated its first lay person and first woman president, Colleen Hanycz, former president of Brescia University College. Hanycz led consolidation and prioritization efforts, ultimately firing two dozen prominent staff members and administrators. The university cut six undergraduate majors, mostly in the foreign language department. In the fall of 2016, La Salle decreased tuition by more than 29 percent to make the school more attractive and accessible for students from more diverse socioeconomic backgrounds.

In September 2020, during the COVID pandemic and following an assessment of the size of the athletic program, the university cut some sports, including baseball and tennis, going from 25 to 18 programs. Enrollment had been dropping since the 2010s--from 3600 undergraduates in 2012-2013 to 2800 in 2020-2021, then to 1700 in 2023, accompanied by a drop in net tuition revenue. According to its 2023 financial report, the university had $127 million in revenue but $140 million in expenses. In March 2025, its credit rating by Fitch Ratings dropped to BB−.

Daniel J. Allen became the new La Salle University president in 2020. Since then, sports teams have been added back, including baseball, and those, along with improved recruitment and enrollment procedures, are credited for financial improvement and an increase in enrollment, to 3263 in 2025.

== Governance ==
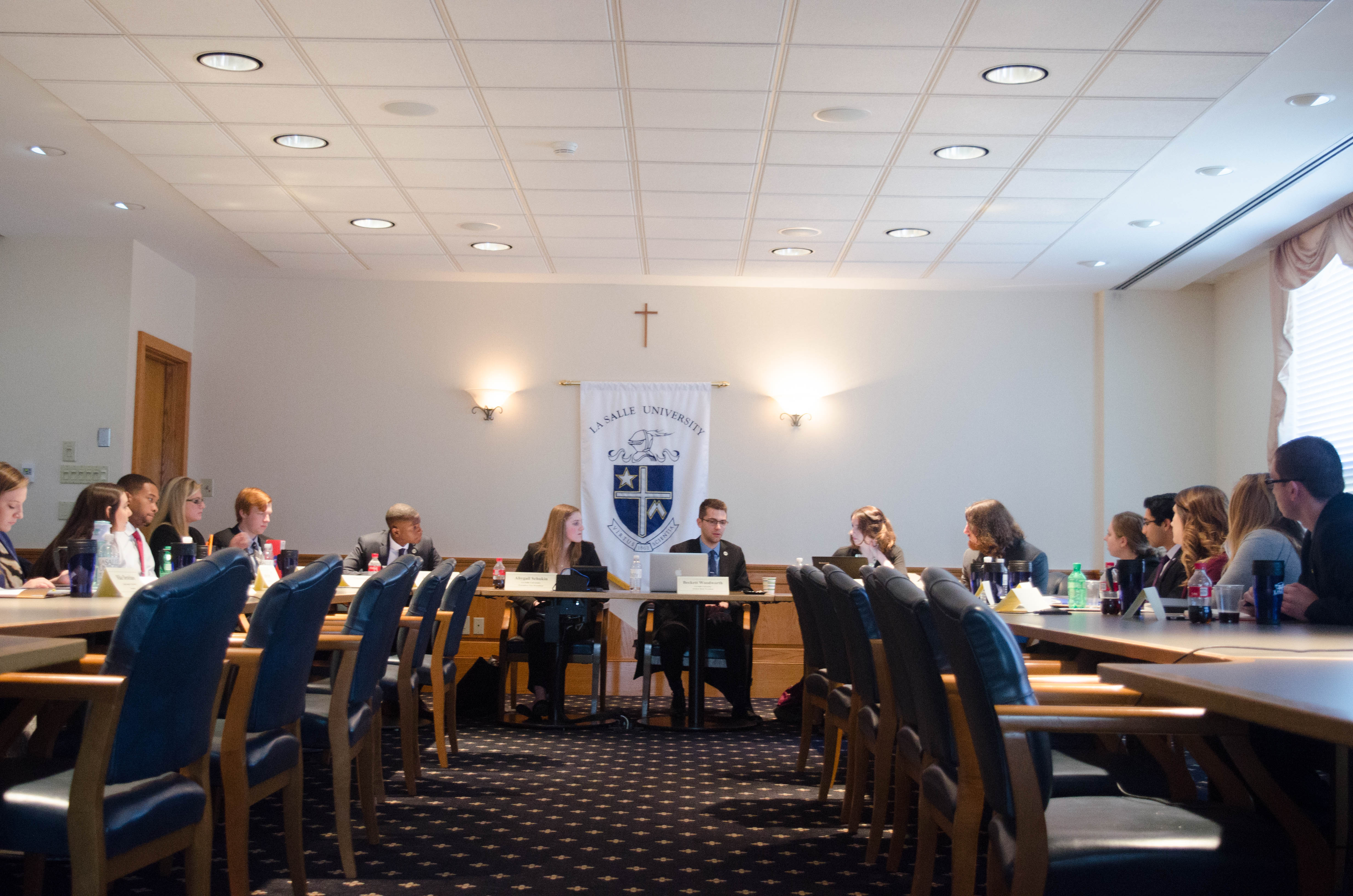
A Big 5 student government meeting in 2016

The university is led by its board of trustees, headed by a president and chair. The president serves one or more five-year terms. As of 2022, there have been 29 presidents. Students are represented through a democratically elected student government. The La Salle Students' Government Association sits on numerous committees led by staff and administrators, including some board meetings. La Salle's student government is a founding member of the American Student Government Association. The president's office, formerly located in the historic Peale House, is now in College Hall, the former business school building.

== Academics ==
Within La Salle is the College of Professional and Continuing Studies and its three schools: Arts & Sciences, Business Administration, and Nursing & Health Sciences. Communication, Nursing, and Education are the largest majors at La Salle. Courses in the programs may be offered in traditional, online, or hybrid formats.

=== Admissions ===
Undergraduate fall enrollment declined from more than 4,500 in 2012 to 3,900 in 2018.

The average GPA for an admitted student at La Salle is a 3.35 on a 4.0 scale. La Salle's acceptance rate is labeled as "moderately difficult" and it admits about 75 percent of students who apply. It requires SAT or ACT scores and an essay for admission. La Salle also uses the Common App for prospective students in the United States.

According to The New York Times, the median family income of a student from La Salle is about $91,000 per year. 40 percent of La Salle students come from families in the top 20 percent of income. 37.1 percent come from families in the bottom 60 percent of income (<$65,000 per year). Less than 1 percent come from families in the top 1 percent of income ($650k+).

=== Academic rankings ===
Academic rankings

Regional
- U.S. News & World Report: 38

National
- Forbes: 288
- Washington Monthly: 141
- WSJ/College Pulse: 311

Publisher	Ranking System	Year	Ranking
The Economist	College Rankings	2015	99
Time Money Magazine	Colleges that Add the Most Value	2016	5
U.S. News & World Report	Best Colleges for Veterans	2017	19
U.S. News & World Report	Best Value Schools	2017	16
U.S. News & World Report	MBA Programs Where Graduates Find Jobs Quickly	2017	4
U.S. News & World Report	Best Colleges, Regional Universities North	2018	34

== Athletics ==
La Salle athletics logo

La Salle University's 23 varsity sports teams, known as the Explorers, compete in the NCAA's Division I. La Salle is a member of the Atlantic 10 Conference (A-10) and the historic Philadelphia Big 5, an informal association of Philadelphia sports programs. As a member of the Big 5, the Explorers historically played against Temple University, the University of Pennsylvania, Villanova University and Saint Joseph's University at least once a year.

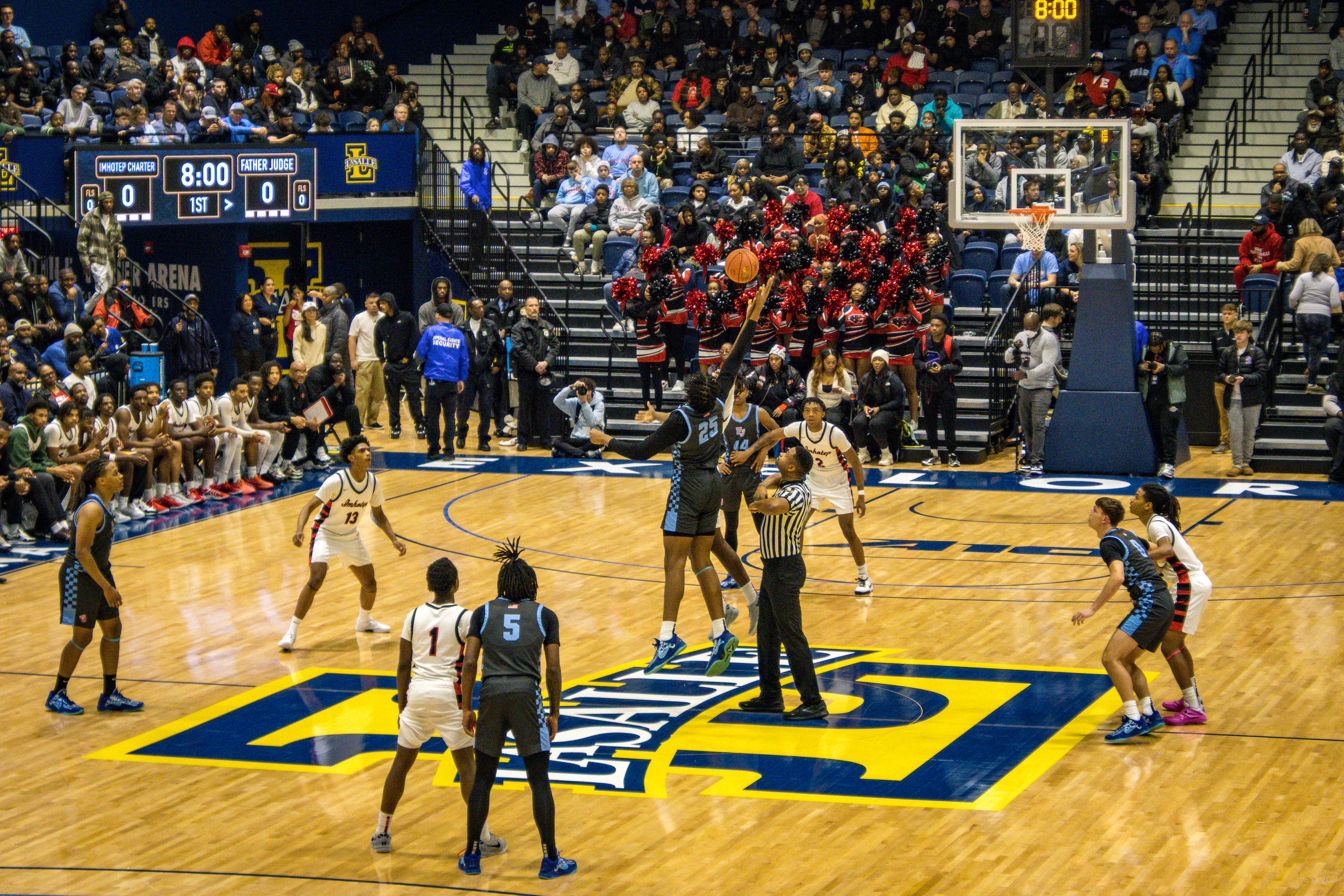
John Glaser Arena, March 22, 2025 (opening tip of Father Judge vs. Imhotep)

Starting in 2023–24, with the retooling of the Big 5 into the Big 5 Classic and the formal addition of Drexel University to the rivalry, La Salle is only guaranteed games with Drexel and Temple, plus one game against one of the other three teams. La Salle has won eleven titles. It has also sent 16 athletes to the Olympic Games a total of 22 times.

La Salle's teams have won two national championships: the 1954 NCAA Men's Division I Basketball Tournament and the 1980 Division II AIAW Field Hockey Championship. The school also won the 1952 National Invitation Tournament. La Salle's major historic rival has been the Hawks of Saint Joseph's University, especially in men's basketball. Not only are both universities located in Philadelphia, they are also both private Catholic institutions.

The name "Explorer" initially came from a 1931 mistake made by a sportswriter, who thought the university was named after the French explorer Sieur de La Salle, when in fact it is named after St. Jean-Baptiste de La Salle. The name was officially chosen in a student contest during the spring of 1932.

The La Salle men's basketball program has been rated the 53rd "Greatest College Basketball Program of All-Time" by Street & Smith's magazine and 71st by the ESPN College Basketball Encyclopedia.

== Campus ==
La Salle moved to its fourth and present location in 1931. The campus is located in part on Belfield, the estate of Charles Willson Peale, a Revolutionary War patriot and painter famous for his portraits of the founding fathers, most notably George Washington. The first to occupy the Belfield land after Peale's death was William Logan Fisher. Fisher was born to the family of Thomas Fisher and Sarah Logan; Sarah had inherited the northeastern portion of Stenton. Fisher owned the land that is now South Campus, and after living there, he gave it to his daughter Sarah Logan Fisher and her husband William Wister. The home there belonged to the Wisters until 1984 when La Salle University purchased the land. What once was the home of a famous artist, and later affluent family, is the current office of the University president.

La Salle's campus is located in the Logan, Philadelphia-Ogontz/Belfield neighborhood of Philadelphia. In May 2007, La Salle created its West Campus after buying a portion of Germantown Hospital in the Germantown neighborhood of the city. La Salle's campus is divided into three parts: North, South, and West campus. Both the North and South parts of campus are located in the Logan-Belfield area of Philadelphia, and the western portion of campus (west of Wister Street) is located in the Germantown, Philadelphia neighborhood of the city.

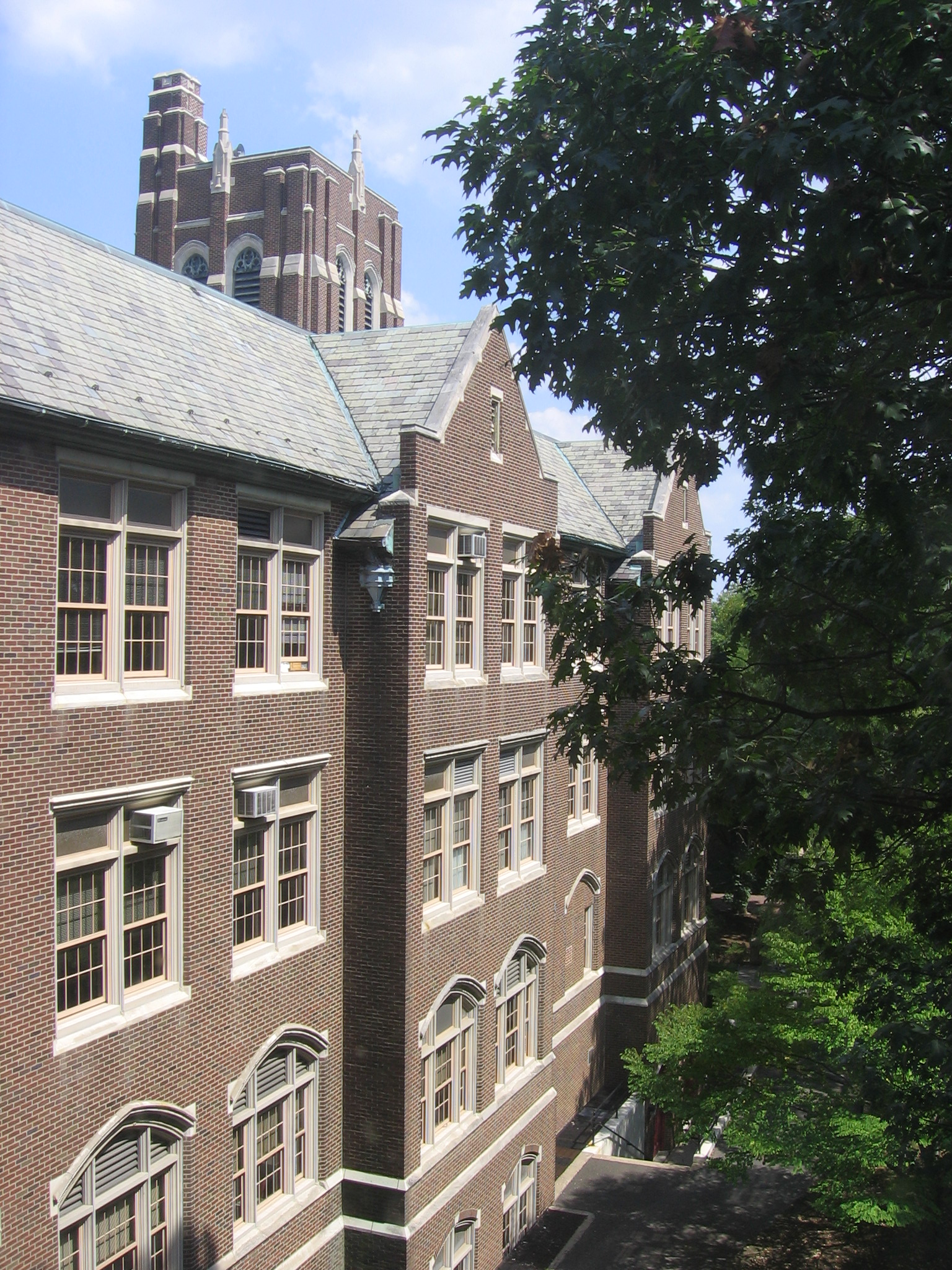
College Hall

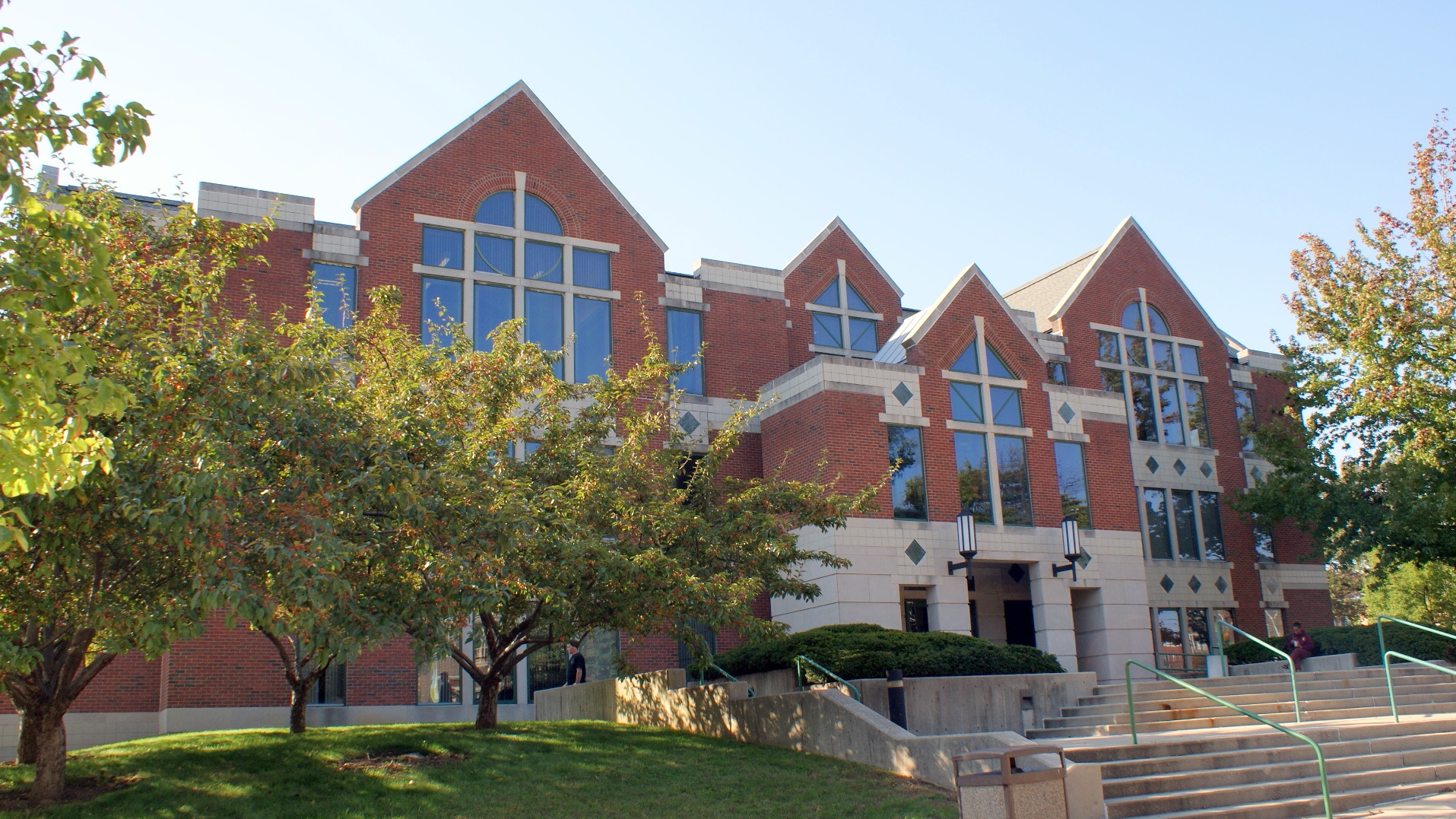
Connelly Library

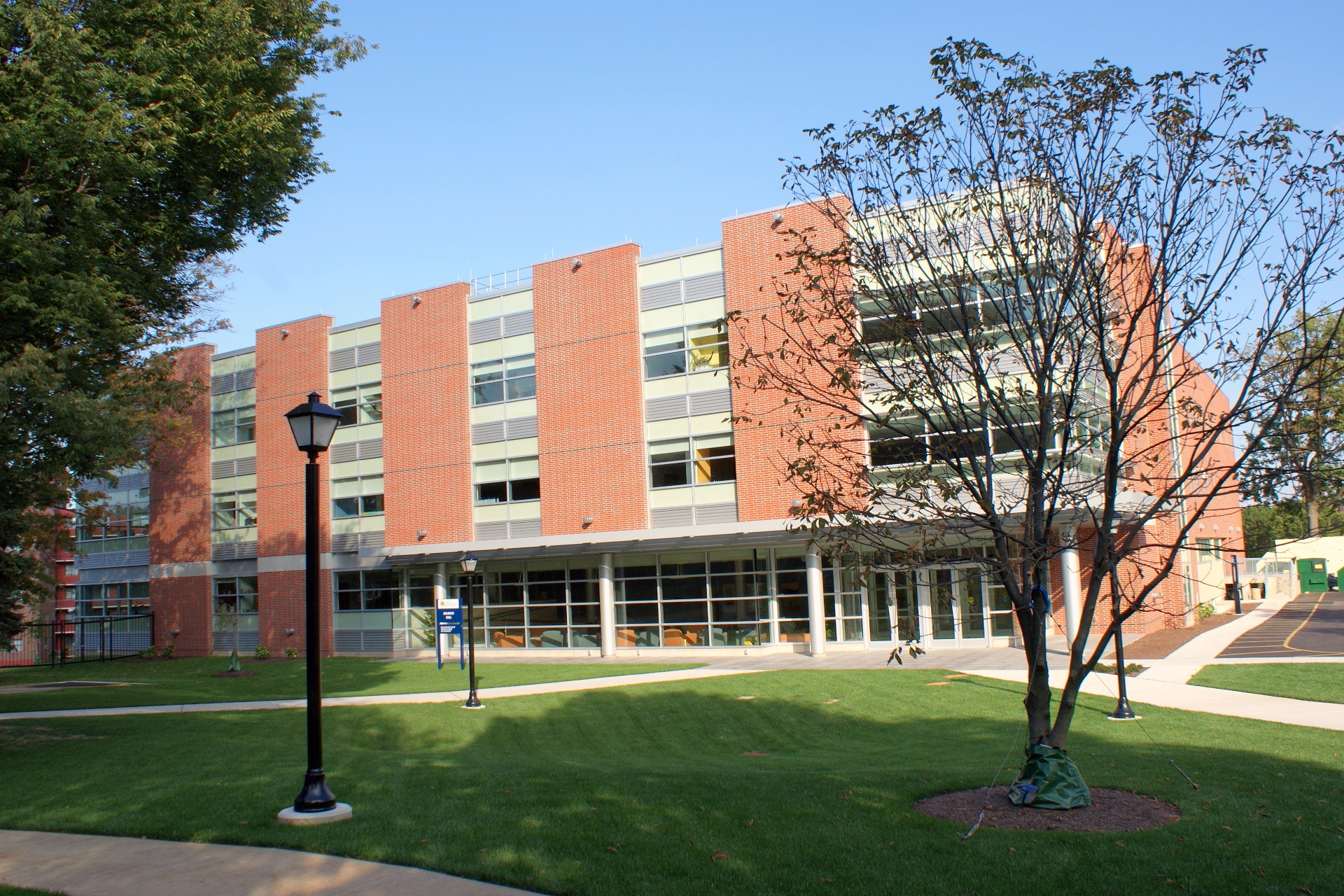
Roland Holroyd Science Center

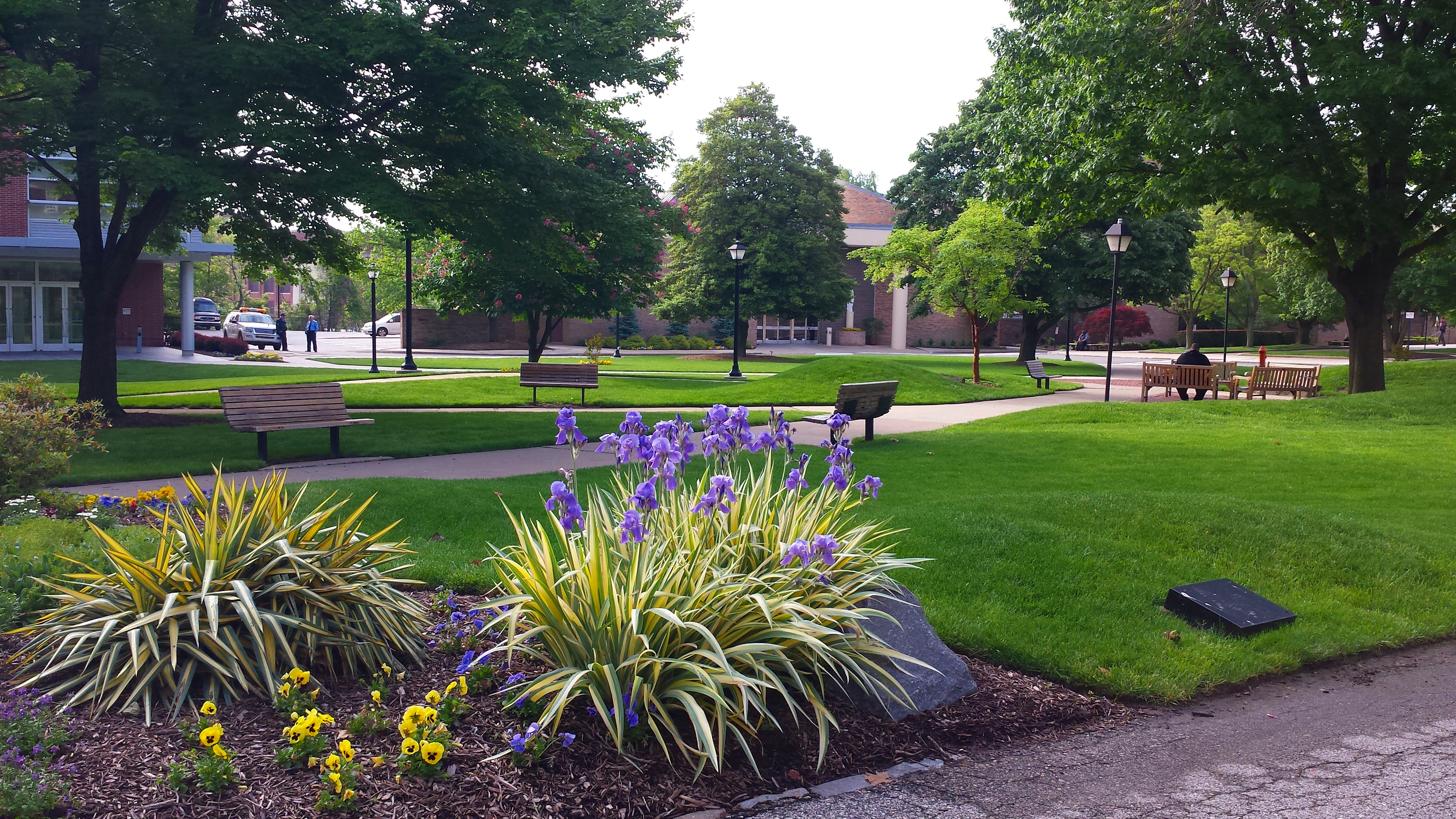
Hansen Quad

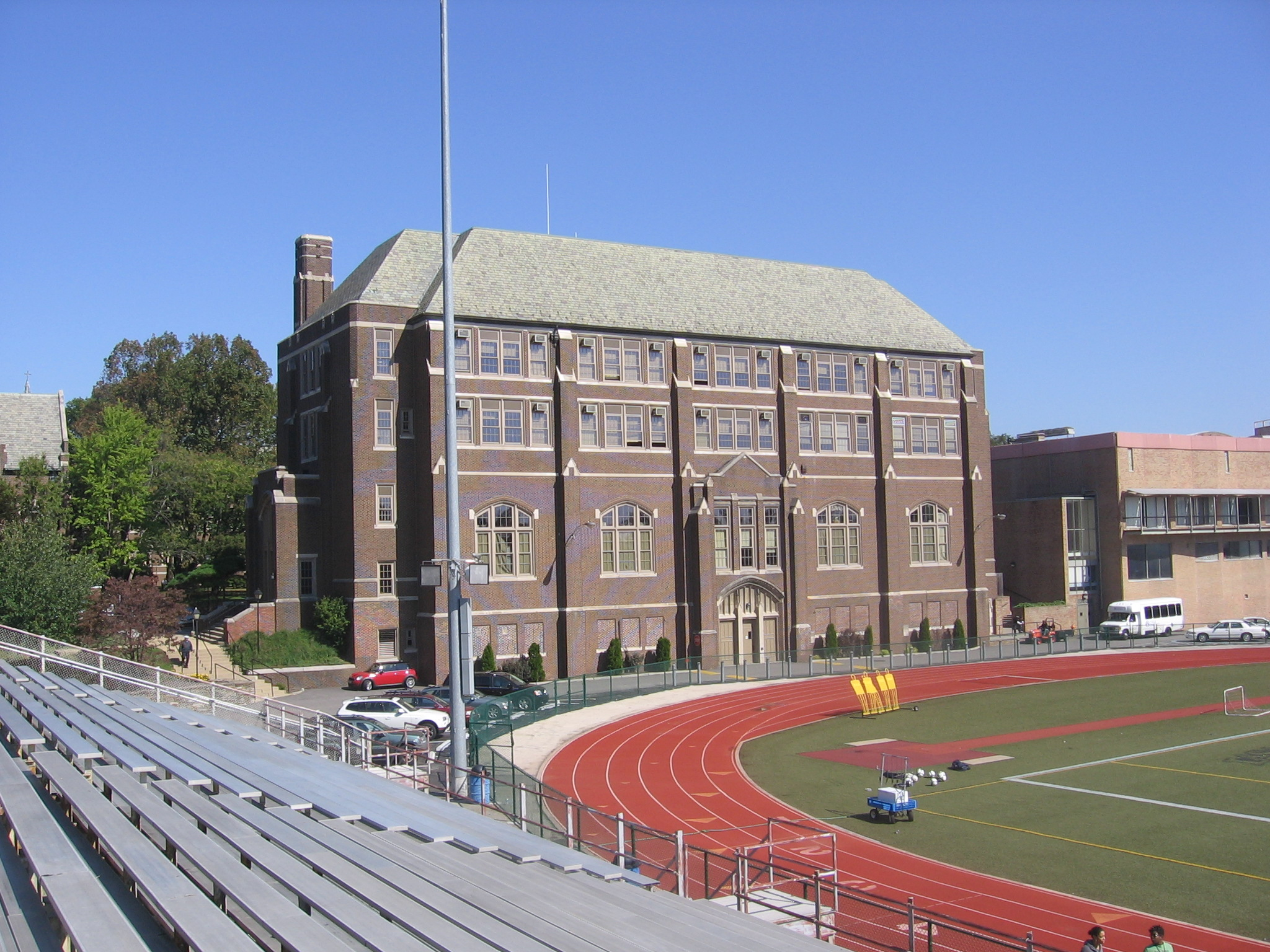
Wister Hall

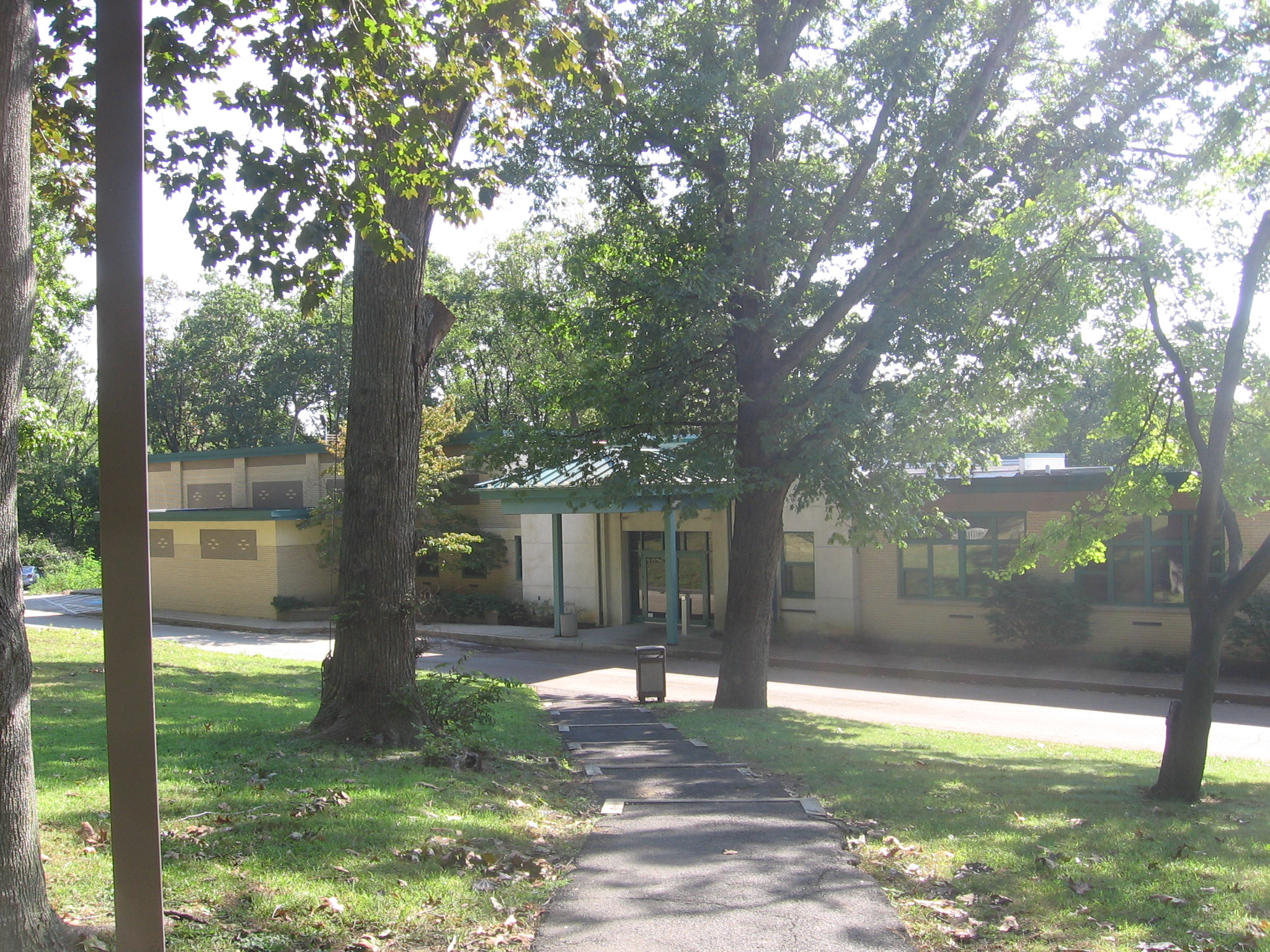
Communications Center

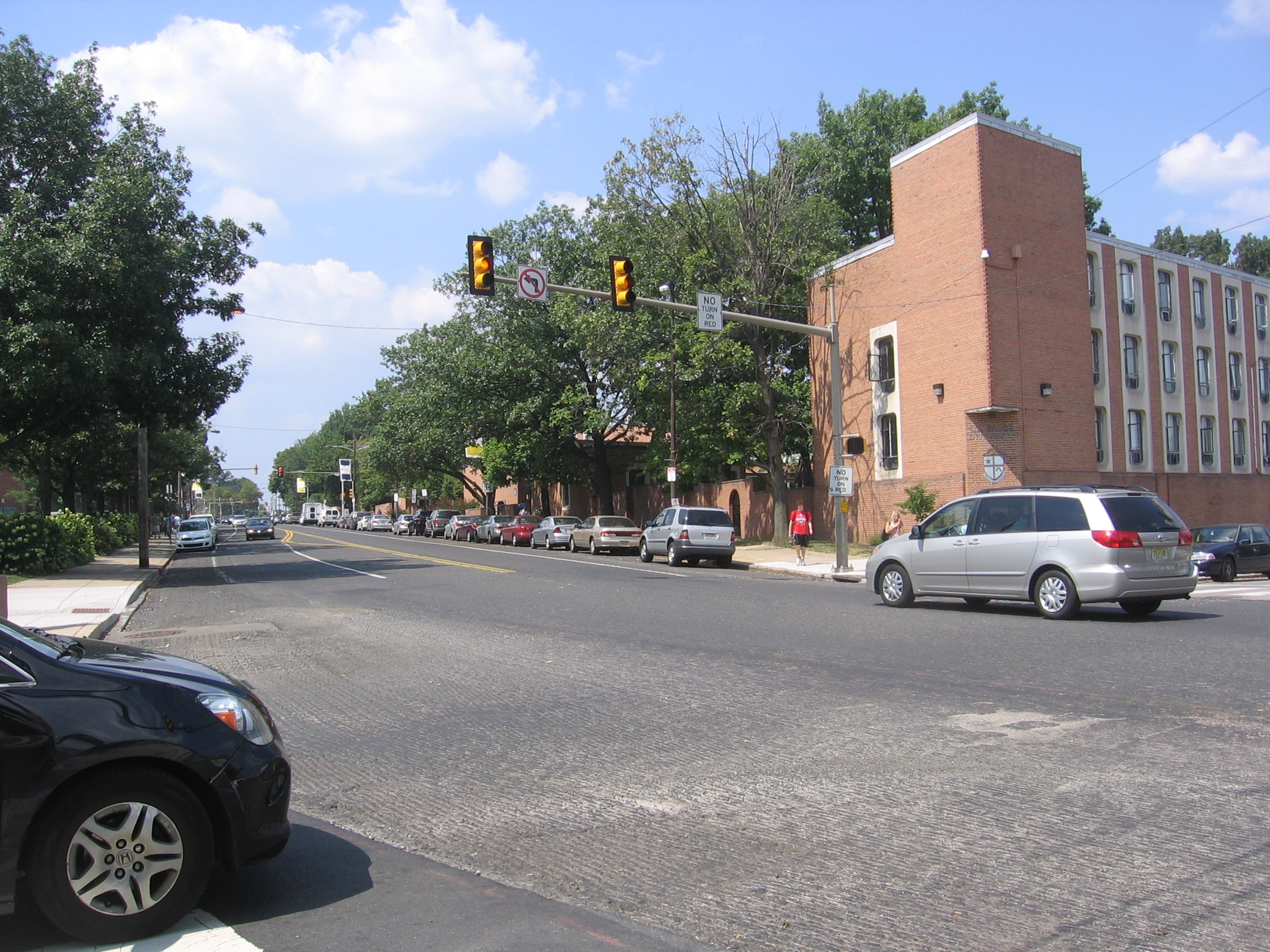
North Residence Halls Complex at 20th & Olney Avenue

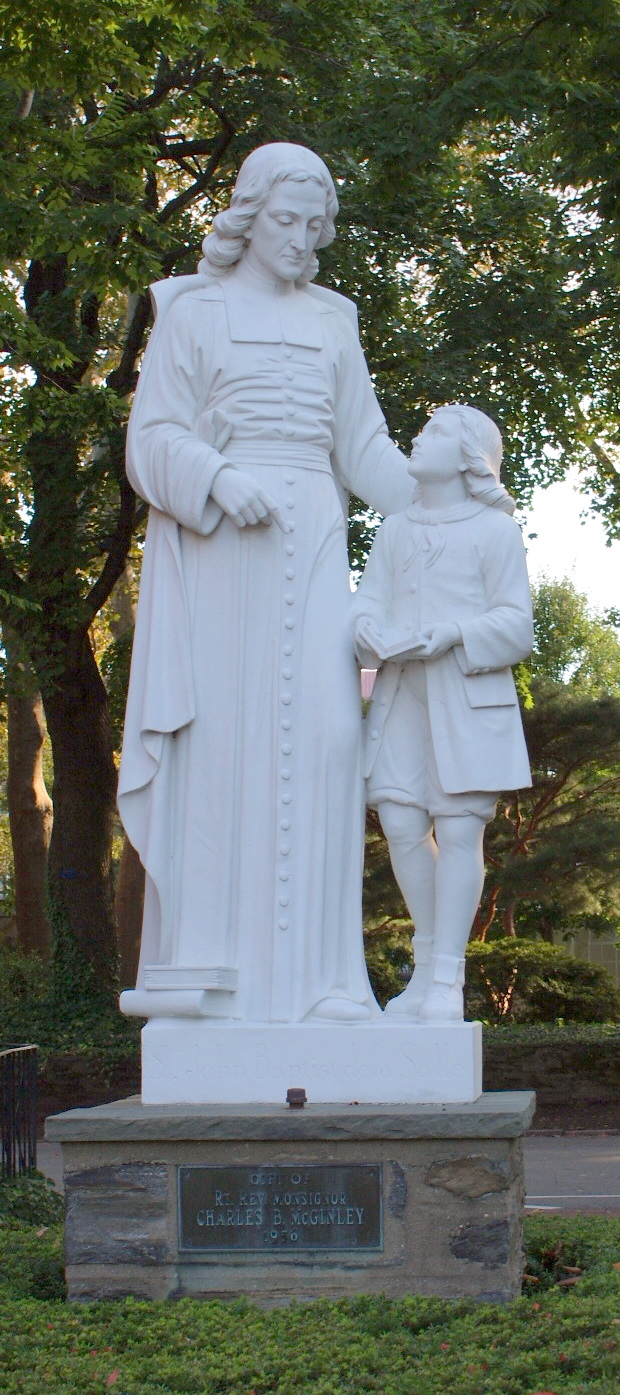
St. John Baptiste de La Salle with a student

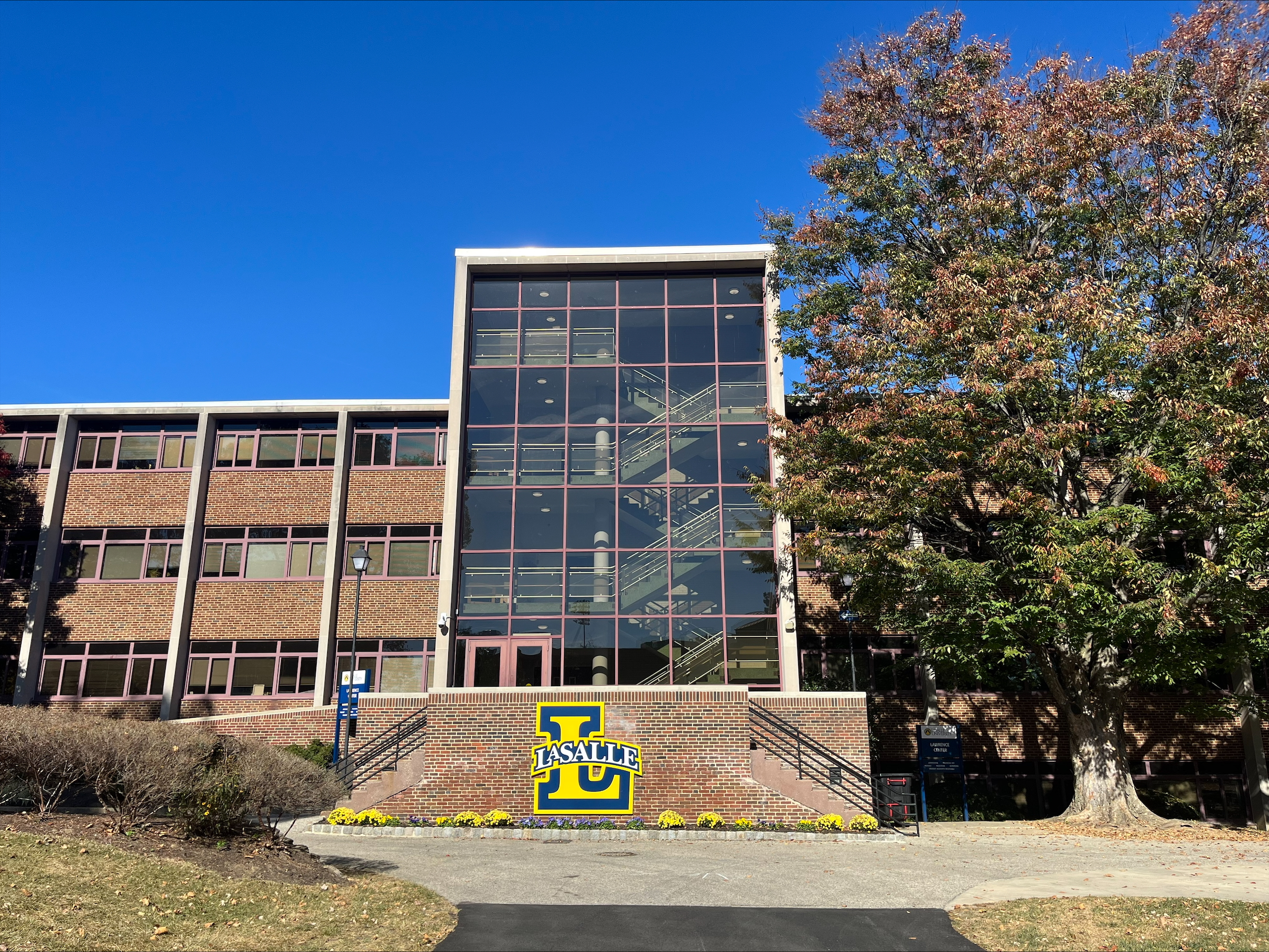
Lawrence Center

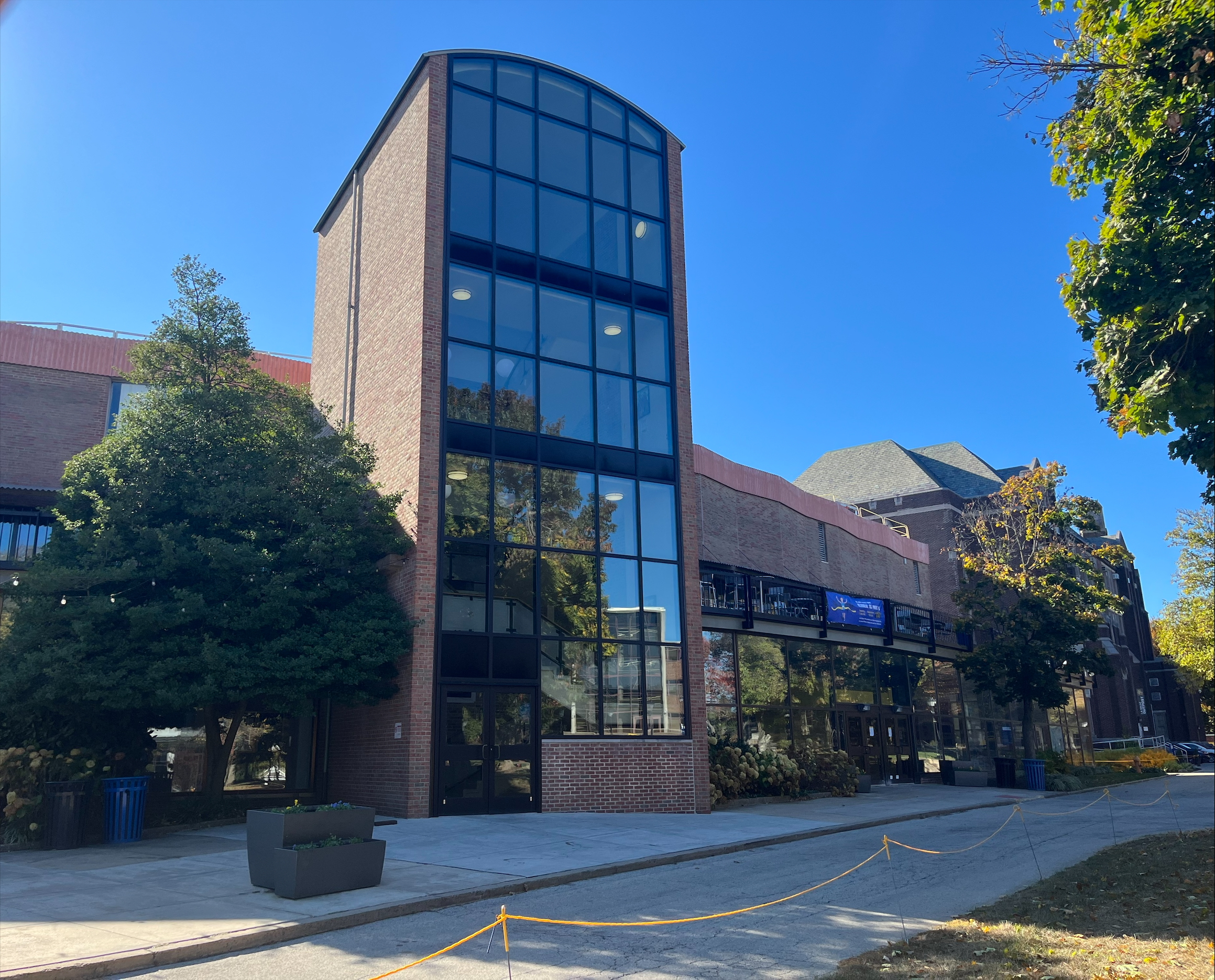
The Union

=== La Salle University Art Museum ===
La Salle University Art Museum is located in the basement of Hayman Hall and houses a collection of European and American art from the Renaissance period to the present day. The museum also owns a number of special collections, including Japanese prints. It is also home to the Walking Madonna, one of four sculptures by British artist Dame Elisabeth Frink. Frink sculpted it in 1981; the other three remain in England, one in Salisbury and the other in Frink's home garden. In early 2018, the university announced plans to sell forty-six artworks from art museum to "help fund teaching and learning initiatives in its new strategic plan". Selling art to fund the university was controversial in the art community and the plan was criticized by artists and museum groups.

=== Student housing ===
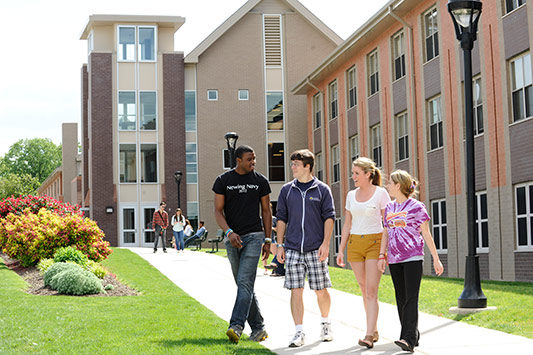
St. Basil Court Residence Hall was rated the best dorm in the country in 2011.

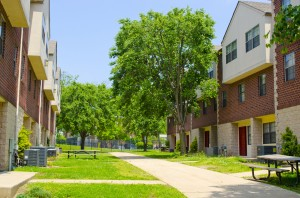
St. Miguel Townhouses

In 2011, St. Basil's Court was rated by DormSplash.com as the best dorm in the country. St. Basil's Court is mostly home to honors students, athletes, and upperclassmen.

Living styles vary by location. In North Residence Halls and St. Neumann, men and women live in the same building but on different floors. In St. Basil's, men and women live on the same floors but on different sides of the hall. La Salle also has individual unit gender-neutral bathrooms in some of their residence halls. In the St. Miguel Townhouses and Apartments, men and women live separately in their own living space with a kitchen and bathrooms. In 2016, students voted to introduce gender-neutral housing in the St. Miguel Townhouses, potentially making La Salle the only Catholic university in the country to facilitate co-ed living. The issue caused controversy in Catholic circles across the United States since it is traditional for Catholic school residence halls to be completely separated by gender.

== Student life ==
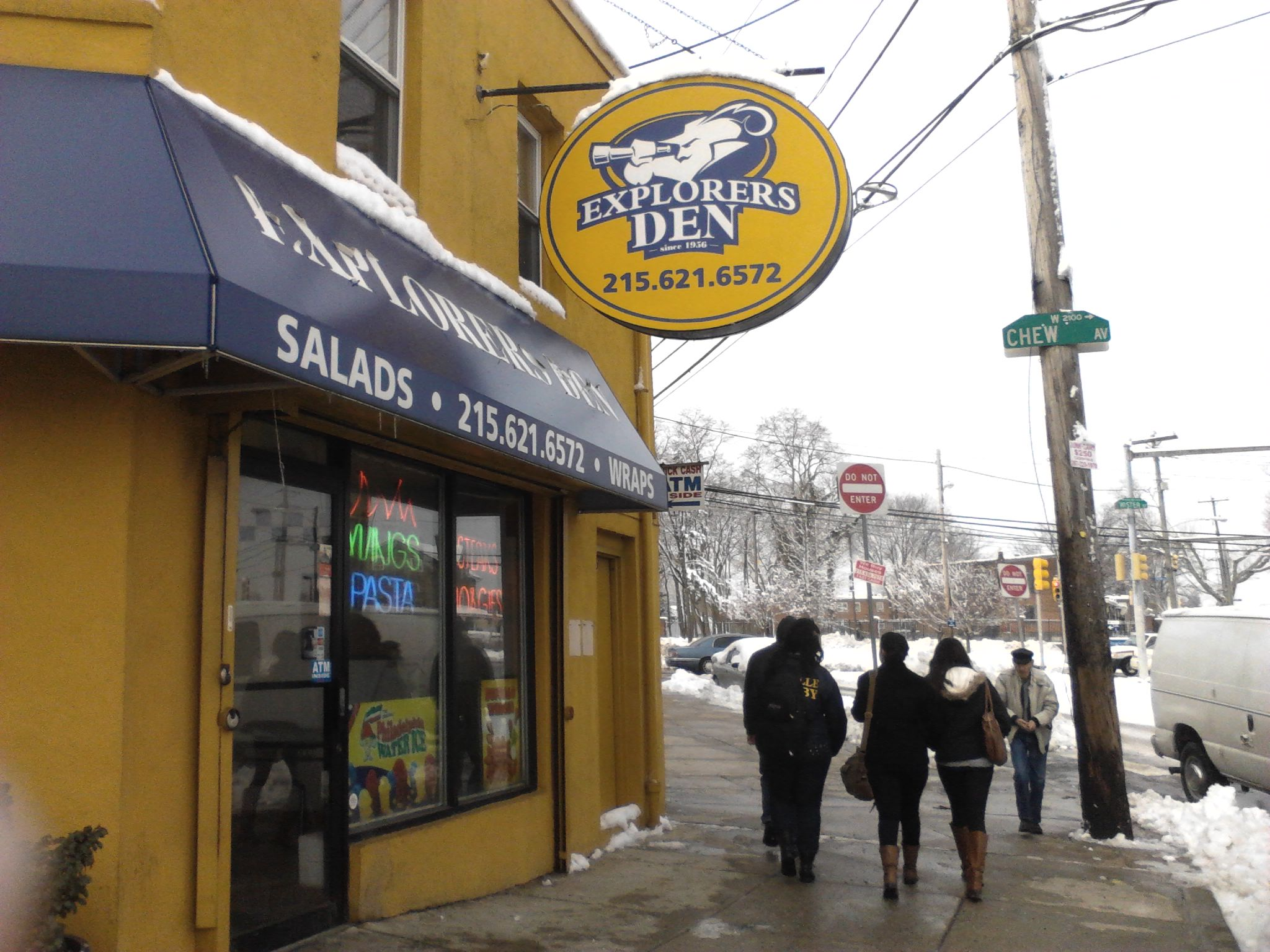
Explorer's Den in Winter 2014

Students at La Salle are offered many opportunities to participate in campus life in different ways. There are numerous organizations and a student programming center that plan student activities (including games, movie nights, bus trips). The Communication Department operates La Salle 56, a cable TV educational-access television station available to 300,000 subscribers (see below). The university also has a student-run radio station, WEXP, and a student-run weekly newspaper, The Collegian, along with over 100 other intramurals, clubs, and NCAA Division I sports offered. La Salle University offers a number of student services, including non-remedial tutoring, a women's center, career advising and placement services, health services, and health insurance. Alcohol is permitted for students of legal age, making La Salle one of the few Catholic wet campuses.

=== Demographics ===
About 55 percent of La Salle students live in college-owned, -operated or -affiliated housing; 45 percent live off campus near the university or commute from home. Student gender distribution is about 37 percent male and 63 percent female. About 35 percent of students have cars on campus.

=== Student media ===
==== La Salle TV ====
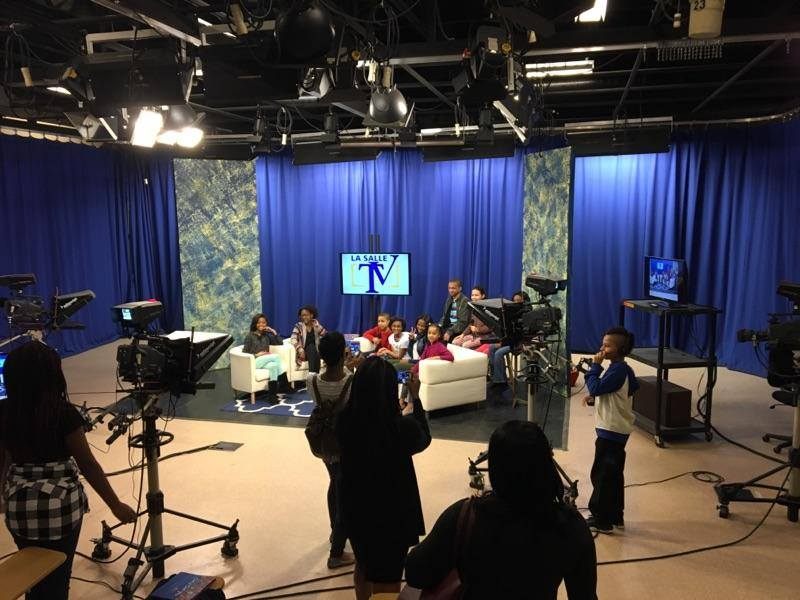
Students tour La Salle TV studios on the university's south campus.

La Salle TV is a student-run, public, educational, and government access (PEG) cable television station offering educational-access television programming run by La Salle and carried within Philadelphia's city limits on the Comcast cable system. The station reaches over 300,000 homes and serves La Salle students and its neighbors with educational and entertaining programs. The station also serves as a hands-on teaching facility for students interested in the communication field. In 2009, La Salle 56 officially changed its name to La Salle TV due to an agreement with Verizon to carry the student television station. La Salle University had initially acquired the cable channel in 1991 as part of franchise agreements between cable providers and the city of Philadelphia.

==== The Collegian ====
Publishing its first issue on March 16, 1931, The Collegian is the only on-campus newspaper for La Salle, published every Thursday throughout the school year. The weekly newspaper is written, edited, and produced by La Salle students working with a faculty adviser. The newspaper is not independent; it has restrictions on content placed on it by the University, the Division of Student Affairs and sometimes the President's Office.

==== WEXP ====
WEXP is a college radio station with a freeform radio format. It previously broadcast on 1600 and 530 AM in the Philadelphia area before becoming an Internet radio-only station.

=== Greek life ===
La Salle's social scene includes its fraternities and sororities. La Salle has fourteen Greek life organizations: ten traditional fraternities and sororities, two Divine Nine (historically black) organizations, and two co-educational fraternities.

==== Fraternities ====
La Salle has six chartered fraternities, five of which are nationally recognized, and one of which, Sigma Phi Lambda, is the university's first and oldest fraternity. (Not to be confused with Sigma Phi Lambda, the nationally recognized sorority founded in Austin, Texas.)

National Fraternity	Greek Letters
Alpha Phi Delta	ΑΦΔ
Alpha Chi Rho	ΑΧΡ
Delta Sigma Phi	ΔΣΦ
Sigma Phi Epsilon	ΣΦΕ
Sigma Phi Lambda	ΣΦΛ
Phi Beta Sigma	ΦΒΣ

==== Sororities ====
La Salle's Greek life community includes six sororities, which were incorporated at the school after 1970, once it started admitting women. Five La Salle sororities are nationally recognized, while Alpha Theta Alpha's only charter is at La Salle, where it originally began as the school's first sorority.

National Fraternity	Greek Letters
Alpha Theta Alpha	ΑΘΑ
Alpha Sigma Tau	ΑΣΤ
Gamma Phi Beta	ΓΦΒ
Delta Phi Epsilon	ΔΦΕ
Zeta Phi Beta	ΖΦΒ
Phi Mu	ΦΜ

==== Co-educational fraternities ====
La Salle also has two co-educational fraternities: business fraternity Delta Sigma Pi and community service fraternity Epsilon Sigma Alpha.

National Fraternity	Greek Letters
Delta Sigma Pi	ΔΣΠ
Epsilon Sigma Alpha	ΕΣΑ

=== University ministry and service ===
La Salle's religiously-affiliated University Ministry and Service (UMAS) program offers student ministry and community service opportunities for students. La Salle holds mass once a day, every week.

== Notable alumni ==
La Salle alumni have earned numerous accolades, scholarships, and titles including an Emmy award, a Pulitzer Prize, six Olympic gold medals, a Marshall scholarship, about one hundred Fulbright scholarships, and more. La Salle has three alumni currently serving in the United States House of Representatives, along with about a dozen representatives in the Pennsylvania General Assembly and one on the Philadelphia City Council.

== See also ==
- Lasallian educational institutions
- List of colleges and universities in Philadelphia
