= Sturtevant =

Sturtevant may refer to:

== People ==
- Aaron Paul Sturtevant (born 1979), better known as Aaron Paul, American actor
- Albert D. Sturtevant (1894–1918), American naval officer
- Alfred H. Sturtevant (1891–1970), American geneticist
- Beaumelle Sturtevant-Peet (1840-1921), American temperance activist and suffragist
- Butler Sturtevant (1899–1971), American landscape architect
- David Sturtevant Ruder (born 1929), American administrator and Professor of Law
- Edgar H. Sturtevant (1875–1952), American linguist
- Edward Lewis Sturtevant (1842–1898), American agronomist and botanist
- Elaine Sturtevant (1924–2014), American artist
- Grace Sturtevant (1865–1947), iris breeder
- Harold Sturtevant (born c1918), United States Navy sailor, known for tearing down Nazi flag
- Glen Sturtevant (born 1982), American lawyer and Virginia politician
- John Cirby Sturtevant (1835–1912), American politician
- Myca Sturtevant, American politician
- William C. Sturtevant (1926–2007), American anthropologist

== Other ==
- B. F. Sturtevant Company and its successors
- Sturtevant, Wisconsin, United States
- USS Sturtevant (DD-240), Clemson-class destroyer, 1920–1942
- USS Sturtevant (DE-239), Edsall-class destroyer escort, 1943–1960
