= A. J. Bliss =

British horticulturist (1862–1931)

Arthur John "A.J." Bliss (1862–1931) was a British iris breeder who is credited with greatly improving the genetics of many modern strains, especially those descending from his Dominion cultivar.

== Early life and education ==
Arthur John Bliss was the eldest son of Rev. William Bliss of Oxford. He was educated at Stonyhurst. He earned his living as a mining engineer in New Zealand (1881-89) and then in South Africa, retiring early due to ill health.

== Career ==
Bliss began breeding irises in about 1902, when he was living in Kent. A decade later he moved to Morwellham Quay in Devon—probably because a brother lived there—and grew his irises on an allotment. He also bred gladiolus and daffodils, but he is best known for his irises.

Bliss kept meticulous records of his breeding program, recording details on every cross from 1902 on. He believed that knowledge of genetics, careful selection, and long-term planning were the keys to success and kept only a fraction of the seedlings he grew. Writing in 1925, Robert Sturtevant noted: “Mr Bliss started with a scientific study of the origins of the common squalens, neglecta, and amoena types and this led on to the creation of garden varieties by carefully planned breeding experiments. To anyone at all familiar with the vagaries of Iris genetics the results obtained from commonplace parents by his ‘progress breeding’ place him above all other breeders who may, somewhat by chance, produce an occasional fine variety.”

Bliss didn't succeed with two of his major objectives—breeding a crimson iris and a plicata (or stippled iris) with a golden ground—but his efforts moved iris genetics significantly forwards. One of his most famous cultivars, Dominion, came along at a moment when he was occupied with the search for crimson and he did not at first notice it. The deep purple, large-flowered Dominion was actually brought to his attention by his young niece Phyllis Bliss, who served as his informal assistant. It was introduced in 1917 by nurseryman R.W. Wallace, who thought so highly of it that he asked 20 times the usual price. Despite its poor growth habits, Dominion "precipitated...a flood of introductions...in the decade 1920 to 1930”, according to John Caspar Wister, and it has been said that without Bliss and Dominion, modern irises would not exist. Iris breeder Ethel Anson Peckham considered him among the three greatest iris breeders, along with William Rickatson Dykes and Michael Foster. Dominion is still part of the ancestry of many newer cultivars, as are three of its descendants bred by Bliss: Cardinal, Bruno, and Grace Sturtevant, the latter a dark bronze cultivar named after an American iris breeder. Collectively, they are known as the Dominion race.

In all, Bliss introduced more than 150 iris cultivars, winning many awards along the way. For his achievements, he was awarded the British Iris Society's Foster Memorial Plaque in 1930.

Deaf from an early age, Bliss tended to keep to himself, focusing his life almost entirely around his iris breeding. He was respected and liked by those who knew him, and he corresponded with many of the notable plant breeders of the day. He also wrote for gardening magazines and championed the founding of iris societies both in England and in America. He had begun preliminary work on a book about iris, daffodil, and gladiolus breeding when he died, of pneumonia, in 1931.

== Legacy ==
In 2008, a collection of Bliss irises assembled by Phyllis Bliss's relative, Anne Milner, was designated a National Collection by the National Council for the Conservation of Plants and Gardens.
