= Louis A. Coolidge =

American journalist and public servant (1861–1925)

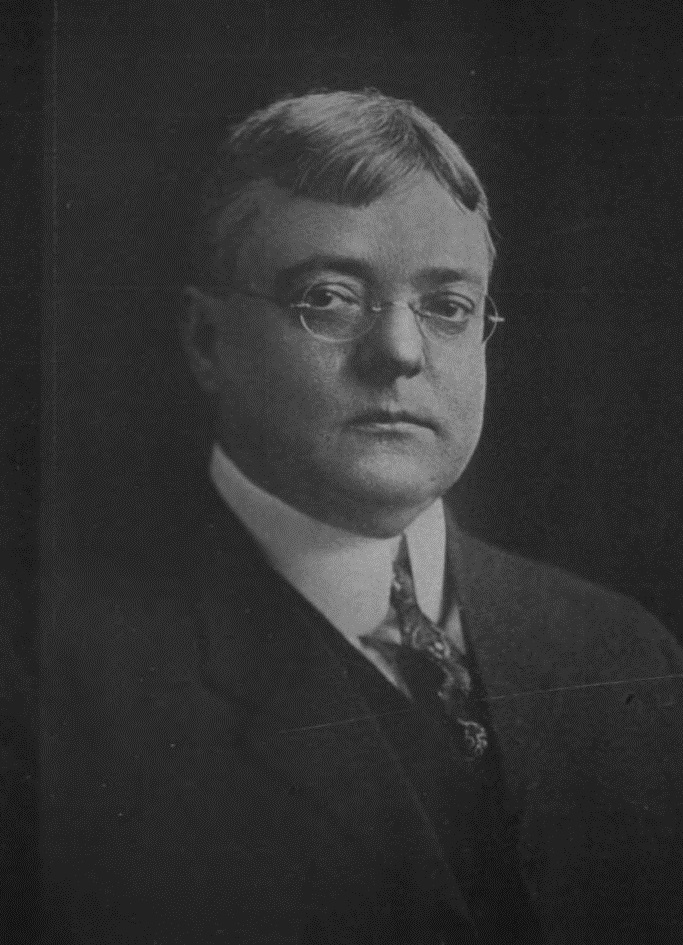

United States Assistant Secretary of the Treasury
- In office March 17, 1908 – April 10, 1909
- President: Theodore Roosevelt; William Howard Taft
- Preceded by: John H. Edwards

Personal details
- Born: October 8, 1861 Natick, Massachusetts, U.S.
- Died: May 31, 1925 (aged 63) Milton, Massachusetts, U.S.
- Spouse: Helen Irene Pickerill (after 1890)
- Education: Harvard College

Louis Arthur Coolidge (October 8, 1861 – May 31, 1925) was an American journalist and Treasury official.

== Early life ==
Coolidge was born on October 8, 1861, in Natick, Massachusetts. He was a son of William Leander Coolidge and Sarah Isabella (née Washburn) Coolidge.

His paternal grandparents were Timothy Coolidge and Lowly Ann (née Howe) Coolidge. His father was a nephew of U.S. Senator and Vice President Henry Wilson and served as the executor of Wilson's estate.

Coolidge graduated from Harvard College.

== Career ==
In October 1883, Coolidge joined the staff of the Springfield Republican where he worked for four and a half years. He resigned in April 1888 to move to Washington to become private secretary to then U.S. Representative Henry Cabot Lodge.

At the beginning of the 51st United States Congress on March 4, 1889, he was appointed Clerk of the House Committee on the election of President, Vice President and Representatives in Congress, of which Lodge was chairman. While in Washington, he worked as the Washington correspondent of the Boston Advertiser and Evening Record and was president of the Gridiron Club.

In 1908, he succeeded John H. Edwards as Assistant Secretary of Treasury, serving under Treasury Secretaries George B. Cortelyou and Franklin MacVeagh during the presidencies of Theodore Roosevelt and William Howard Taft.

In April 1924, while he was Treasurer of the United Shoe Machinery Corporation, he announced that he would seek the Republican nomination for U.S. Senator. His run was unsuccessful and by March 1925, he resigned from the United Shoe Corporation, months before his death on May 31, 1925.

== Personal life ==
On January 2, 1890, Coolidge was married to Helen Irene Pickerill (1871–1947), the daughter of Frank B. Pickerill and Allie Sharpe Pickerill. Together, they were the parents of:

- Helen Longstreet Coolidge (1894–1957)
- Margaret Coolidge (1899–1979), who married landscape architect and iris breeder Robert Sturtevant, the only child of noted agronomist Edward Lewis Sturtevant.
- John Washburn Coolidge (1903–1990), senior vice president of international divisions of United Shoe Machinery, who in 1930 married landscape architect Helen Seymour (1907-1998).

Coolidge died on May 31, 1925, in Milton, Massachusetts. After a funeral at the Old South Church in Boston, he was buried at Dell Park Cemetery in Natick.
