= USS S-35 =

American submarine

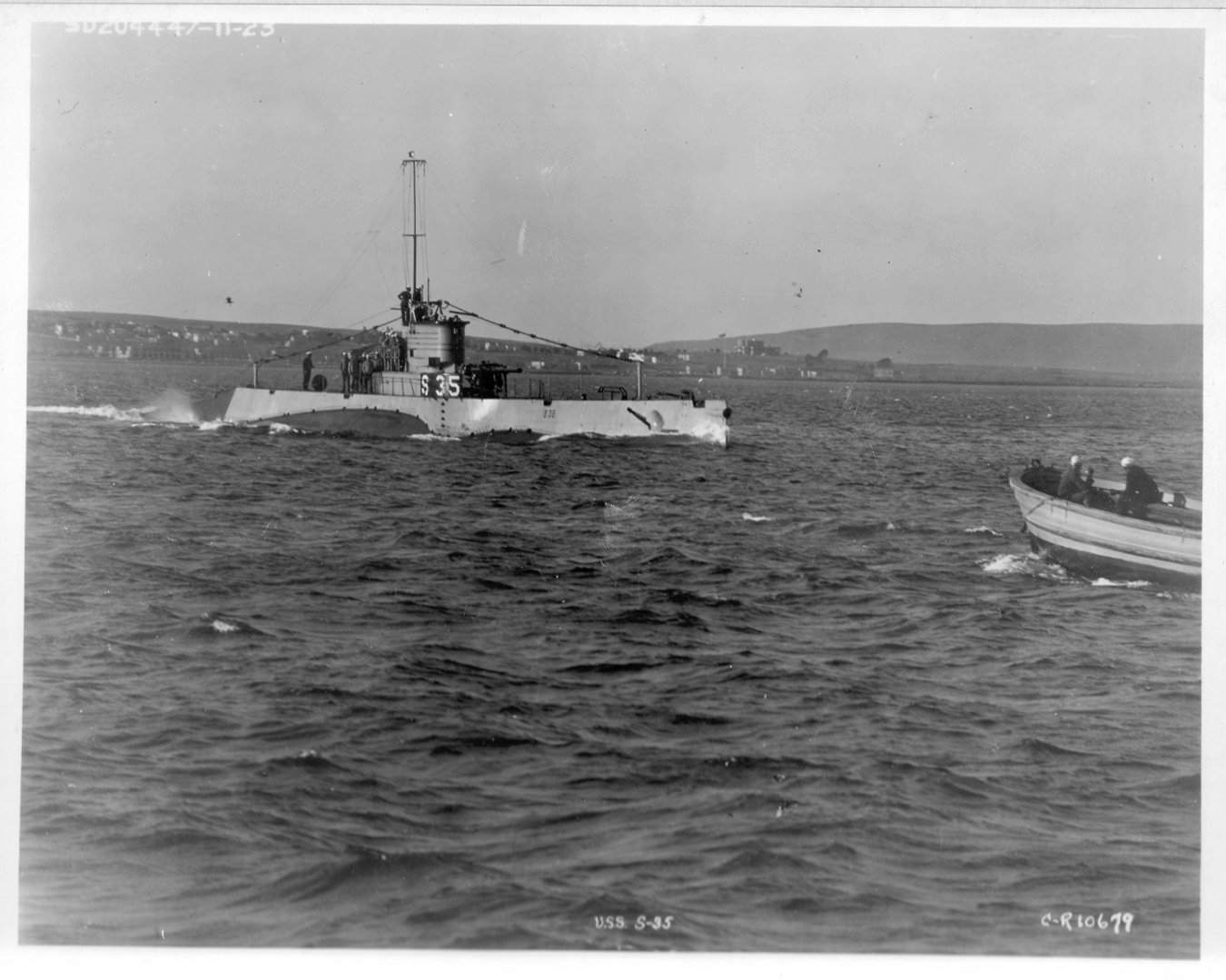
- USS S-35 off San Diego, California, in November 1923.

History

United States
- Name: USS S-35
- Builder: Bethlehem Shipbuilding Corporation, San Francisco, California
- Laid down: 14 June 1918
- Launched: 27 February 1919
- Sponsored by: Miss Louise C. Bailey
- Commissioned: 17 August 1922
- Decommissioned: 25 October 1922
- Recommissioned: 7 May 1923
- Decommissioned: 19 March 1945
- Fate: Sunk as target 4 April 1946

General characteristics
- Class & type: S-class submarine
- Displacement: 854 long tons (868 t) surfaced; 1,062 long tons (1,079 t) submerged
- Length: 219 ft 3 in (66.83 m)
- Beam: 20 ft 8 in (6.30 m)
- Draft: 15 ft 11 in (4.85 m)
- Speed: 14.5 knots (16.7 mph; 26.9 km/h) surfaced; 11 knots (13 mph; 20 km/h) submerged
- Complement: 42 officers and men
- Armament: 1 × 4 in (102 mm)/50 deck gun; 4 × 21 inch (533 mm) torpedo tubes

Service record
- Operations: World War II
- Awards: 1 battle star

USS S-35 (SS-140) was an S-class submarine of the United States Navy.

== Construction and commissioning ==
S-35′s keel was laid down on 14 June 1918 by the Bethlehem Shipbuilding Corporation in San Francisco, California. She was launched on 27 February 1919, sponsored by Miss Louise C. Bailey, and commissioned on 17 August 1922.

== Service history ==
=== 1922–1941 ===
Engaged in trials as improved engines were developed for her class, S-35 was ordered to New London, Connecticut, in September, for alterations by the prime contractor, the Electric Boat Company. Decommissioned and delivered to that company on 25 October, she was accepted and recommissioned on 7 May 1923. Exercises along the East Coast and in the Caribbean Sea followed and, in early August, she arrived at San Diego, California, her home port until 1925. Then transferred to the Asiatic Fleet, she departed from San Francisco, California, in mid-April and arrived at the Submarine Base, Cavite, Philippine Islands, on 12 July.

S-35 operated in Philippine waters, conducting patrols and participating in type, division, and fleet exercises until the spring of 1926. Then she sailed, with her division, for the China coast. Through the summer and into the fall, she conducted similar operations out of Tsingtao; and, in November she returned to the Philippines where, after overhaul, she resumed local operations.

She maintained a similar schedule of winter operations in the Philippines and summer deployments in Chinese waters through 1931. On 2 May 1932, she moved east, instead of north, and at the end of the month, arrived at Pearl Harbor where she joined the Pacific Fleet and commenced a schedule of exercises, overhauls, and fleet problems which took her into the 1940s.

In 1934, she won the Marjorie Sterrett Battleship Fund Award for the highest merit in battle torpedo practice of submarines.

In April 1941, she was transferred to San Diego, California, and, for the remaining months of peace, she provided services for the West Coast Sound School.

=== World War II ===
After the Japanese attack on Pearl Harbor on 7 December 1941 brought the United States into World War II, S-35 added defensive patrol work to her duties; and, in January 1942, she moved north to Mare Island, California.. for limited modernization and overhaul. In late March 1942, she continued northward and, in early April, arrived at the newly established submarine base at Dutch Harbor.

==== First war patrol ====
On 12 April, she cleared Dutch Harbor and moved toward the Kuril Islands for her first war patrol. On 21 and 22 April, snow and fog covered her approach to Paramushiro and Onekotan Strait. On 23 April, she sighted and was sighted by, a large enemy submarine on the surface. Both submarines submerged. Explosions were felt in S-35. The blasts forced her down further than expected, but she regained control at 220 feet, returned to her intended depth; and maneuvered out of the immediate area.

The weather cleared on 24 April, and Paramushiro was sighted for the first time. Two days later, however, the S-boat was en route to her secondary station north of Attu. On arrival on 27 April, a ship's cook was discovered to have mumps and a course was set for Dutch Harbor. Isolation was impossible, and half the crew had not had the disease.

Three days later, S-35 returned to her Unalaska base. The crew received medical attention, the boat was scrubbed down and refitted; and requests for modern equipment, including sonar and radar, were made.

==== Second war patrol ====
Toward the end of May, the submarine was ready for sea; and, on 28 April, she moved west in response to intelligence reports of a Japanese invasion force bound for the western Aleutian Islands.

On station by 30 April, she patrolled on the surface with no contacts, through 2 June. On the morning of 3 June, word of the bombing of Dutch Harbor was received. Aerial contacts, both friendly and enemy became frequent; but the submarine was not attacked.

On 11 June, she was ordered back to Dutch Harbor to replenish; thence, she was routed to the western part of the archipelago for offensive operations near Kiska which had been taken by the Japanese. On 14 June, she approached the island and patrolled between there and Segula until 23 June. She then participated in the search for sister ship S-27, which had run aground on Amchitka Island; returned to her patrol area late on 25 June; and, on 29 June, returned to Dutch Harbor. The thick fog which had shielded the Japanese force as it crossed the Bering Sea had remained over the Aleutians during her patrol, impairing visibility and hindering her offensive efforts.

==== Third war patrol ====
On 14 July, S-35 got underway again and, through the end of the month, patrolled the Japanese supply lanes to Kiska. She then headed back toward Dutch Harbor, but was diverted north and west of the island to provide weather reporting services to the force scheduled to bombard Kiska on 7 August. After the raid, she returned to Dutch Harbor, thence proceeded to San Diego, where for six weeks she underwent overhaul and provided services to the sound school.

==== Fourth war patrol ====
On 20 October, she returned to Unalaska; and, on 26 October, she cleared the harbor for her fourth war patrol. From then until her return on 22 November, she battled heavy seas, storms, and problems arising from her inadequate and outmoded equipment as she hunted the Paramushiro-Attu-Kiska convoy routes. On 25 November, she returned to Dutch Harbor.

==== Fifth war patrol ====
Cold weather added icing to the climatic hazards of the northern Pacific Ocean; but, on 11 December, S-35 headed out of Dutch Harbor again. On 15 December, she commenced operations to intercept enemy traffic to Attu and Kiska; but, on 17 December, a case of acute appendicitis forced her to Adak, Alaska, where she was to transfer the sick man to seaplane tender Gillis for treatment. On 18 December, she approached the rendezvous point but was sighted by enemy planes. On the morning of 19 December, she completed the transfer; then resumed patrol east of Kiska. On the afternoon of 21 December, she ran into a storm while surfaced off Amchitka; and, by early evening, waves were smashing over the bridge and cascading into the control room. The conning tower hatch was ordered shut. Almost simultaneously, another huge wave crashed over the bridge, flinging the captain, Lieutenant H. S. Monroe, into the hatch. Injured, Monroe retired to his quarters, only to be roused a short time later, about 18:30, by cries of "fire" in the control room.

Electric arcs and blue flames spewed out of the main power cables coming from the forward battery. Smoke filled the room; and water, which had caused the fire by soaking cables and causing a short, rose in the control room bilges. The fire was extinguished in the control room but immediately broke out in the forward battery. Fire extinguishers had no effect. The forward two compartments were abandoned and the battery was secured. Fire again broke out in the control room; and, as in the forward battery, extinguishers were of little help. Smoke filled the control room. The engines were stopped. The room was abandoned and sealed. Short circuits spread. Electrical equipment was disabled. A hole was burned in the top of the Number Two main ballast tank and lines from two air banks were severed.

At about 18:55, unsuccessful attempts to reenter the control room, using escape lungs, were made. Shortly thereafter, two volunteers, using oxygen charged lungs, entered the room; flooded the magazines; partially blew the Number Three main ballast tank to gain more freeboard; and shut the auxiliary induction to seal the forward battery.

The fight to save the submarine continued. The engines were started again; a fire extinguisher watch was set over the section of cable still arcing; and a bucket brigade was organized to assist in keeping down the water level. By 20:00, all extinguishers had been emptied. But S-35, under manual control, was moving east.

The morning of 22 December brought new fires. Twice, at 07:00 and at 11:00, eruptions forced the crew to the bridge. But the same flares apparently contributed to the fire's burning itself out. After the second, the forward battery was sufficiently discharged and the cables sufficiently ruptured to prevent further fire in the control room. Smoke from the forward battery compartment, however, continued to be a problem until she entered Kuluk Bay and the battery was disconnected. Arriving at noon on 24 December, the boat was ventilated; medical help was obtained; four men were hospitalized; and mattresses, bedding, and clothing were dried.

On 29 December, S-35 made her way, under escort, into Dutch Harbor. Usable equipment was removed for installation in other S-boats, and, on 14 January 1943 she began the long trip to the Puget Sound Navy Yard for repairs. Arriving at Bremerton, Washington on 29 January, repairs took her into the spring. From 20–31 May, she conducted post repair trials; and, on 3 June, she moved north again.

For heroism and devotion to duty in saving the submarine and her crew Lieutenant Commander Stone and Chief Electrician's Mate Frederick H. Barbero were awarded the Navy and Marine Corps Medal for non-combat heroism.

==== Sixth war patrol ====
Arriving at Dutch Harbor on 11 June, she once more made her way west on 17 June. Despite numerous material casualties, which slowed her to an average speed of a little more than 5 knots, she continued toward the Kuril Islands and arrived in her patrol area on 25 June. On 26 June, she transited Onekotan Strait; and, on 27 June, she sighted her first target of the patrol, a large Japanese freighter. The target, however, soon outdistanced the World War I-design submarine and disappeared into the ever-present fog.

Material defects continued to cause problems. Her starboard engine soon went out of commission; and, as repair work was started, a freighter and a destroyer were sighted approaching on a course which would bring them over her position. A half hour later, the two enemy ships passed overhead, one to port, the other to starboard. Repair work was then resumed.

By dawn of 29 June, the engine was again operable; and, on 30 June, S-35 shifted north to Araido, thence proceeded to the Kamchatka Peninsula, whence she moved back down the coast and covered Shimushu Strait, Paramushiro Strait, and Araido Strait.

On 1 July, she found a clear area in the fog and sighted a fishing tender awaiting the return of its trawlers. At 18:02, she fired two torpedoes at ten-second intervals; watched the first hit; and saw the second porpoising haphazardly through the water toward the target. At 18:06, she fired a third torpedo and watched the target explode and list heavily to starboard. By 18:21, the 5430-ton Banshu Maru Number Seven had disappeared, but others remained in the area where she had been. S-35 reloaded and turned to firing position; but, by 18:25, the new targets had receded into the fog. Five minutes later, fast screws were heard; and the submarine began evasive tactics and cleared the area.

On 2 July, S-35 received orders to shift to the convoy routes leading to southern Paramushiro. Arriving on 4 July, she remained through 16 July. Clear weather arrived with dawn of the last day, and, that afternoon, the submarine sighted a destroyer patrolling in concert, apparently, with a flying boat. As the flying boat disappeared toward its base, S-35 prepared to attack. At 15:41, she began her approach on the destroyer. At about 15:42, the destroyer sighted her. She went deep. For the remainder of the day and well into the night, the two adversaries maneuvered for position: S-35 evading depth charges and attempting to gain a favorable firing position; the destroyer keeping the submarine on evasive tactics and attempting to pinpoint her location and deliver a decisive depth charge. Success went to neither side.

On the morning of 17 July, S-35 cleared the area and headed back toward the Aleutians. On 21 July, she arrived at Attu; and, on 25 July, she moored in Dutch Harbor. During the patrol, she had had only five clear days; four had been partially clear, the remainder had been foggy with poor to very poor visibility.

==== Seventh war patrol ====
On 6 August, S-35 began her seventh war patrol. Standing out of Dutch Harbor, she made for Attu, topped off in Massacre Bay; then proceeded to her patrol area. On 11 August, she sighted a ship, but was unable to close. On 19 August, cracks developed in the port engine crankshaft and couplings; and she turned back for Dutch Harbor. Overhaul followed her return; and on 26 November, she was again ready to hunt in the Kurils. Underway that day, she arrived on station on 8 December, and for the next ten days, encountered heavy seas, snow, and "mild icing" as she searched waters off Onekotan and in the Sōya-Araido and Omintao-Mushashi-Kashiwabara shipping lanes. On 19 December, she shifted north; reconnoitered the Kamchatka peninsula; then, headed home. En route, engineering defects again became critical, and almost 20 hours were spent in repairs. On 25 December, she arrived at Attu; and, on 30 December, she entered Dutch Harbor to complete her last war patrol.

==== January 1944–March 1945 ====
Fleet submarines now replaced the World War I-designed types. The Aleutian S-boats, as with those operating in other areas, were reassigned to training duty or designated for inactivation. S-35 was assigned to Pearl Harbor where she arrived in mid-February 1944 and immediately commenced training operations. In the spring, she was ordered to the Marshall Islands. Through the summer, she provided training services out of Majuro and Eniwetok, then returned to Pearl Harbor. In January 1945, she proceeded to San Diego for inspection and repairs, and, in February, she returned to Oahu for use as a damage control school ship.

== Decommissioning and disposal ==
Decommissioned on 19 March 1945, she served as a school ship and then as a target ship. Her hulk was sunk by torpedo fire on 4 April 1946. Her remains were located by the Lost 52 Project as announced on 4 August 2020.

== Awards ==
- Yangtze Service Medal
- American Defense Service Medal
- American Campaign Medal
- Asiatic-Pacific Campaign Medal with one battle star
- World War II Victory Medal
