= American Iris Society =

The American Iris Society (AIS, founded 1920) is an organization dedicated to sharing information about and sponsoring research on the iris, a temperate zone plant that is often cultivated for its showy flowers. A major goal in its early years was to bring order to the then-confused nomenclature of the genus Iris, especially garden iris species and cultivars. Its members comprise horticulturists, botanists, gardeners, plant breeders, and nursery owners.

== History ==
The founding of the AIS was prompted by the growing popularity of irises as garden plants in America, spurred in part by an award-winning exhibit of iris cultivars at the 1915 Panama–Pacific International Exposition in San Francisco, in part by William Rickatson Dykes' landmark 1913 book The Genus Iris, and in part by a small flood of articles in popular magazines like Country Life.

The AIS was founded in January 1920, at a meeting hosted by the New York Botanical Garden (NYBG). Organizing efforts were led by horticulturist John Caspar Wister (first AIS president); James Boyd, president of the Pennsylvania Horticultural Society, who chaired the founding meeting; A. C. Beal, head of the NYBG's Department of Horticulture; iris breeder siblings Grace Sturtevant and Robert Sturtevant (first secretary of the AIS); horticulturist Louisa Boyd Yeomans King of the Garden Club of America; horticulturist Ethel Anson Peckham, who managed the Bronx Park Iris Trial Gardens; garden book author Louise Beebe Wilder; Mary Helen Wingate Lloyd, creator of an "iris bowl" garden in Pennsylvania; and others. Several founding members came from the world of peony fanciers, including Lee R. Bonnewitz, a nurseryman and president of the American Peony Society; W. F. Christman, secretary of the Northwestern Peony and Iris Society; and chemistry professor A.P. Saunders, who edited the bulletin of the peony society.

The AIS was organized as a consortium of six regional subgroups, and it incorporated in 1927. There are now 22 regions covering the United States and Canada. It publishes a regular newsletter, Irises: The Bulletin of the American Iris Society.

Even before the AIS was founded, Wister started compiling a checklist of iris cultivars as the first step in efforts to reduce confusion around iris nomenclature. The AIS also established a registry to track cultivars. In 1922 and 1923, issues of the bulletin carried successive version of the AIS's preliminary checklist. Two large checklists were published as books in 1929 and 1939 under the title of the American Iris Society Alphabetical Iris Checklist. The first of these included some 12,000 names of species, cultivars, and their synonyms, while the 1939 book embraced 19,000 names. Ever since, the AIS has published a compilation of new registrations once a decade. In large part because of its sustained efforts at resolving nomenclature issues, the AIS became, in 1995, the official International Cultivar Registration Authority for all non-bulbous cultivars of the genus.

=== AIS Foundation ===
In 1971, an American Iris Society Foundation was established to foster research to improve the genus, to stimulate interest in the plant, and to sponsor publications about irises. The first project supported by the foundation was a revised edition of an AIS book, Garden Irises (issued in 1979 as The World of Irises).

== Awards ==
The AIS gives out various annual awards for different categories of iris types and species, including the Dykes Memorial Medal (its highest honor); the John C. Wister Medal; the Williamson-White Medal, and some dozen others.

The New York Botanical Garden holds an archive of records relating to the founding of the AIS.
