= Lost 52 Project =

Organisation looking for sunken submarines

The Lost 52 Project is a private organization founded by Tim Taylor to do research on the 52 U.S. Navy submarines lost on patrol during the Second World War, performing discovery, exploration, and underwater archeology where possible.

Found, so far:

Submarines	Date lost	Circumstances of loss	Date found
USS S-36	21 January 1942	Scuttled after striking Taka Bakang reef near Sulawesi	13 May 2001
USS Lagarto	4 May 1945	Depth charged by Japanese escort ships while attacking a convoy in the Gulf of Thailand	May 2005
USS Grunion	30 July 1942	Sank after torpedo and dive plane malfunction near Kiska	August 2006
USS Wahoo	11 October 1943	Sunk after combined aerial bombing and surface depth charging in the La Pérouse Strait	31 October 2006
USS Perch	3 March 1942	Depth charged on 1 March, partially repaired, then scuttled after being fired upon on the surface to prevent falling into enemy hands near Surabaya	23 November 2006
USS Flier	13 August 1944	Struck a mine and sunk in the Balabac Strait	1 February 2009
USS R-12	12 June 1943	Sank due to flooding from unknown causes in forward battery compartment near Key West	25 May 2011
USS S-26	24 January 1942	Sank after collision with Sub chaser PC-460 in the Gulf of Panama	September 2014
USS S-28	4 July 1944	Sank under unknown circumstances near Oahu	20 September 2017
USS Robalo	26 July 1944	Presumed to have struck a Japanese mine near Palawan Island	May 2019
USS Stickleback	29 May 1958	Sank after collision with USS Silverstein during training near Hawaii	August 2019
USS Grayback	27 February 1944	Sunk by aerial bomb from Japanese B5N torpedo bomber in the East China Sea	10 November 2019
USS S-35	4 April 1946	Used as a target ship and sunk by torpedo fire	4 August 2020
USS Harder	24 August 1944	Depth charged by Japanese escort ships while attacking them near Dasol Bay	May 2024
USS Bonefish	18 June 1945	Destroyed by Japanese escort ships during an attack on the cargo ship Konzan Maru in the Sea of Japan	2025

The organization has not limited itself to discovery of submarines. It has also located other Navy ships:

Ship	Date Lost	Circumstances of loss	Date found
USS Mannert L. Abele	12 April 1945	Struck by kamikaze plane and Japanese flying suicide bomb during the Battle of Okinawa	December 2022
USS Drexler	28 May 1945	Struck by multiple kamikaze planes during radar picket station duty off Okinawa	2025
USS William D. Porter (DD-579)	10 June 1945	Fatally damaged by a bomb-laden kamikaze plane that came to be underneath the ship's keel and abandonded	2025

As of 2026, the organization has announced that it has also located non-US Navy ships:

Ship	Date Lost	Circumstances of loss	Date found
Konzan Maru	18 June 1945	Torpedoed and sunk by the USS Bonefish	2025
