= USS Silverstein =

John C. Butler-class destroyer escort of the United States Navy

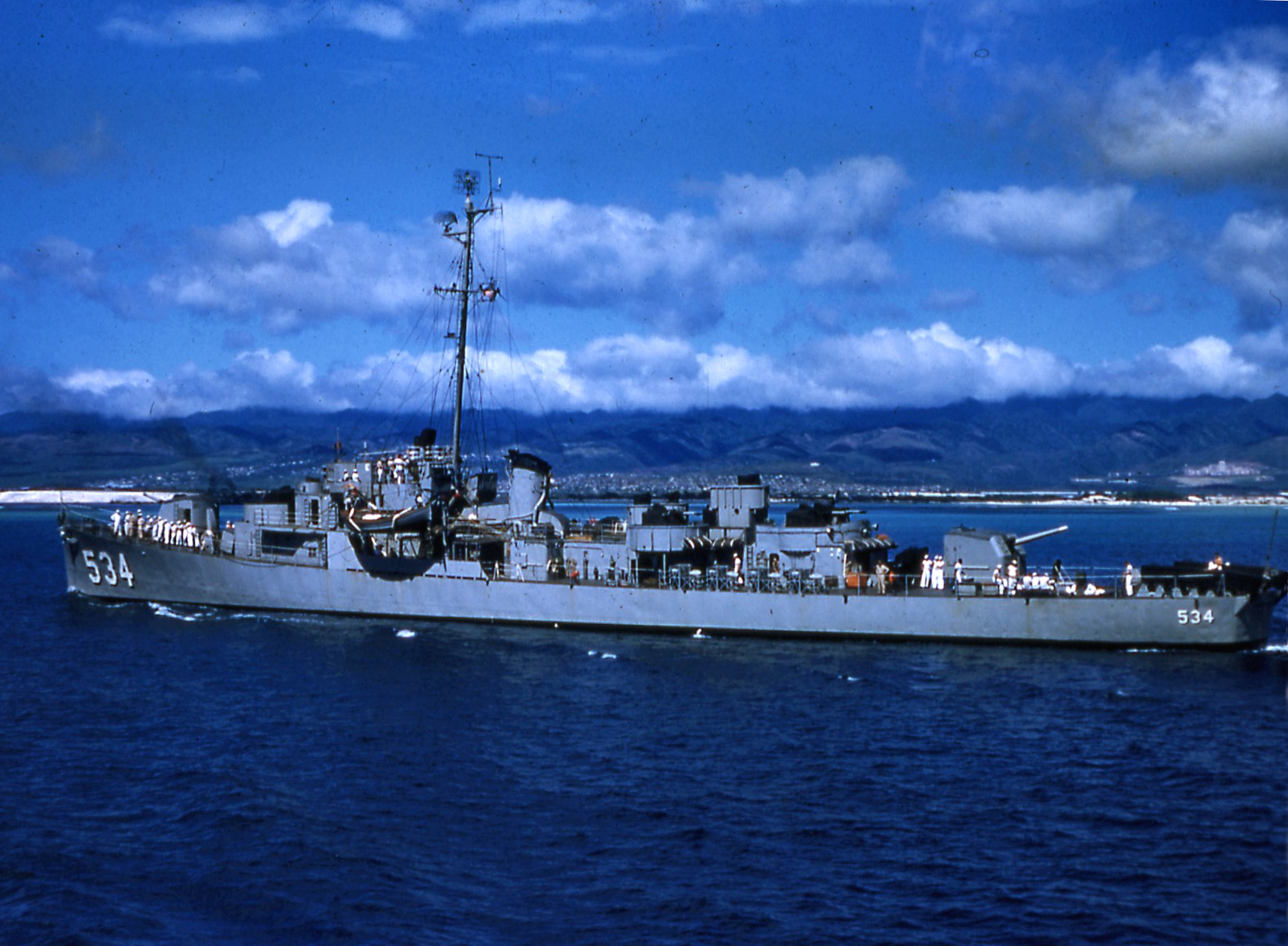

History

United States
- Laid down: 8 October 1943
- Launched: 8 November 1943
- Commissioned: 14 July 1944
- Decommissioned: 15 January 1947
- In service: 28 February 1951
- Out of service: 30 January 1959
- Stricken: 1 December 1972
- Fate: Sold for scrapping 3 December 1973

General characteristics
- Class & type: John C. Butler-class destroyer escort
- Displacement: 1,350 long tons (1,372 t)
- Length: 306 ft (93 m) (oa)
- Beam: 36 ft 10 in (11.23 m)
- Draft: 13 ft 4 in (4.06 m) (max)
- Propulsion: 2 boilers, 2 geared steam turbines, 12,000 shp, 2 screws
- Speed: 24 knots
- Range: 6,000 nm @ 12 knots
- Complement: 14 officers, 201 enlisted
- Armament: 2 × 5"/38 guns, 4 (2×2) 40 mm anti-aircraft (AA) guns, 10 × 20 mm AA guns, 3 × 21-inch (533 mm) torpedo tubes, 1 × Hedgehog, 8 × depth charge throwers, 2 × depth charge tracks

USS Silverstein (DE-534) was a John C. Butler-class destroyer escort in service with the United States Navy from 1944 to 1947 and from 1951 to 1958. She was sold for scrapping in 1973.

== Namesake ==
Max Silverstein was born on 15 February 1911 in Chicago, Illinois. He was appointed midshipman at the United States Naval Academy on 18 June 1928. He was commissioned ensign on 2 June 1932 and went to sea in USS Chester on the 26th as an aircraft gunnery observer. He was promoted to Lieutenant (junior grade) on 2 June 1935 and subsequently served on USS Chaumont, USS Tattnall and USS Seattle. After being promoted to lieutenant on 13 March 1940, later changed to date from 1 August 1939, he reported for duty as Engineer and Damage Control Officer on USS Sims.

On 7 May 1942, during the Battle of the Coral Sea, Sims came under aerial attack. Though knocked unconscious by the first bomb, Silverstein quickly recovered and "coolly directed the securing of the boilers, the jettisoning of topside weights to preserve stability and the preparations for repairs to save the vessel from sinking." He died soon thereafter when Sims sank. He was posthumously awarded the Silver Star medal.

== History ==
Silverstein was laid down on 8 October 1943 at the Boston Navy Yard, Boston, Massachusetts; launched on 8 November 1943; sponsored by Mrs. Ruth B. Silverstein; and commissioned on 14 July 1944.

=== Pacific War ===
Silverstein departed Boston on 5 August 1944 for shakedown training at Bermuda and returned on 7 September for post-shakedown overhaul. On the 17th, she reported for duty at Norfolk, Virginia, to begin training prospective escort vessel crews, but, eight days later, cleared Hampton Roads for the Panama Canal en route to Hawaii. Along the way, she served as escort to ATR-56, towing YF-728 and YF-729 to Miami, Florida. A month after her departure from Norfolk, she entered Pearl Harbor, Hawaii.

After two months training in the islands around Pearl Harbor, Silverstein got underway for the Western Pacific Ocean. She made overnight stops at Eniwetok and Saipan and arrived at Guam on 14 January 1945. The next day, she and George stood out of Apra Harbor, Guam, bound for Ulithi. Upon entering that harbor in the Carolines, Silverstein commenced upkeep. From Ulithi, she sailed for Eniwetok on 1 February, arrived four days later, and joined the logistics support group of the U.S. 5th Fleet. She remained there until the 9th when she sortied with a group of oilers to join the main replenishment group, Task Group 50.8, at that time refueling and rearming the Fast Carrier Task Force which, in turn, was in the process of pounding Iwo Jima.

On her way to rendezvous with task group TG 50.8, Silverstein encountered a small fishing vessel on 16 February. A boarding party found six emaciated Japanese soldiers, some enemy army manuals and various other papers. She then sank the vessel by gunfire and depth charges. On the next day, the oiler USS Patuxent suffered an internal explosion, and Silverstein screened her against submarine attack while two other escorts helped fight the fires. Once the fires were out, Silverstein shepherded the crippled oiler to the relative safety of Saipan. By 21 February, the destroyer escort was back with the replenishment group off Iwo Jima. She remained in the screen of TG 50.8 until early March when she cleared the area for Ulithi. She arrived there on 7 March and began preparations for the Okinawa invasion to come in April.

Silverstein departed Ulithi on 25 March escorting a convoy of eight LST's, a tanker, and an oiler to the anchorage at Kerama Retto, about 20 miles from Okinawa. On the 28th, after seeing her charges into the anchorage, she joined TG 50.8, and screened it as it resupplied the Fast Carrier Task Force. She cleared Okinawa in early June for overhaul at Ulithi, from 17 June to 3 July.

Afterward, she sailed for San Pedro Bay in the Philippines, where she arrived on 5 July. She was then released from the U.S. 3rd Fleet, which had been so designated upon Admiral Halsey's assumption of command on 27 May, and reassigned to Task Force 94 for convoy escort duty. She returned to Ulithi on 13 July; and, from then until 16 September, she protected the supply echelons on the Ulithi-Okinawa shuttle. Silverstein had one break in the convoy routine between 2 and 5 September when she sailed to Guam and screened Prince William back.

From late September until mid-October, she participated in the supervision of the evacuation of Japanese garrison troops from Yap Island to Japan. She was overhauled at Guam between 22 October and 5 November, then she got underway to return to the United States via Eniwetok and Pearl Harbor. She arrived at San Pedro, Los Angeles, on 23 November and began inactivation at the Todd Shipyard soon thereafter. She was moved to San Diego, California, on 18 April 1946, and was placed in reserve, but still in commission, on 30 November 1946. On 15 January 1947, she was placed out of commission, in reserve, berthed at San Diego.

=== Cold War ===
Silverstein recommissioned at San Diego on 28 February 1951 under the command of Lt. Comdr. J. R. Kittrell. By 8 July, she completed shakedown training and post-shakedown overhaul and was on her way to her new home port, Pearl Harbor. Arriving at Pearl Harbor on 14 July 1951, she resumed training, particularly antisubmarine warfare training, until 29 October, when she headed from Pearl Harbor to Yokosuka, Japan. She made her destination on 9 November and, 10 days later, set out for the Korean coast in company with McGinty.

She left McGinty at Wonsan Harbor, Korea, on 21 November and continued on to the bomb line where she patrolled until 24 November. Returning to Wonsan on that day, she remained until the 27th, bombarding enemy positions in that harbor; then got underway for Mororan, Japan. She provisioned at Mororan on 29 and 30 November, then departed on 1 December for Inchon, Korea, and barrier patrol duty. After two days at Inchon, she returned to Japan, visiting Otaru on 11 and 12 December, Atami on 14 December and then putting to sea for four days of antisubmarine warfare (ASW) training. On 18 December 1951, Silverstein put into Yokosuka for 10 days of repair and upkeep.

She resumed ASW training on the 28th while in transit to the Okinawa operating area. After a brief period at Buckner Bay, she assumed patrol duty in the Taiwan Strait on 5 January 1952. Silverstein came off patrol duty on 17 February and returned to Okinawa to resume ASW training, then to act as plane guard for Bataan. On 29 February, she returned to Japan at Sasebo. On 6 March, she stood out of Sasebo and headed back to patrol duty off Wonsan and on the bomb line. Later, the escort joined a task group of the United Nations blockading and escort force and participated in the siege of Hungnam. Her duties were divided between bombardments, anti-mining duty, and patrolling against enemy fishing activities.

On 20 March 1952, she reentered Sasebo for upkeep. Eleven days later, she departed again for Korea. She arrived at Wonsan on 1 April and was again directed to patrol the bomb-line. During one of her bombardments, Silverstein destroyed a shore battery. On the 4th, she headed back to Wonsan; then continued south to guard against enemy submarines and mining activity. On the 6th, she was again in the Wonsan-Hungnam area. She dueled with a shore battery on the 26th and rescued South Korean troops operating against it from sampans. She arrived at Sasebo on 30 April, sailed for Yokosuka on 10 May, and arrived there on the 12th. On 15 May, she departed Yokosuka for Pearl Harbor, arriving at that port on 24 May.

For the next 12 months, Silverstein operated out of Pearl Harbor, was overhauled twice and visited San Francisco, California. On 9 May 1953, she headed back to the Far East for another tour of duty along the Korean coast. She sailed into Sasebo on 21 May and stood out again the next day. After screening a replenishment group and escorting Mount Baker to Sasebo, she reported for patrol duty at Pusan, Korea. Relieved from patrol duty in the Southern Defense Zone, she put into Sasebo on 26 June and, by 8 July, was back off Korea at Cheju Do. After this and another routine patrol off Korea, Silverstein headed east for Pearl Harbor on 1 December.

The destroyer escort arrived in Hawaii 10 days later. While at Pearl, she participated in more ASW exercises, took part in an unsuccessful search for a Royal New Zealand Air Force bomber lost in the vicinity of Kwajalein, and was overhauled. Following overhaul, she conducted refresher training in preparation for another deployment to the Western Pacific. On 17 November 1954, she exited Pearl Harbor and set course for Yokosuka.

She escorted Mount Rainier to Sasebo, arriving on 29 November. On 7 December, she sailed for Pohang, Korea, and arrived the following day. While on this deployment, she patrolled the waters off the Korean coast, assisted in the evacuation of Nationalist Chinese forces from the Tachen Islands, and conducted training exercises.

Silverstein returned to Pearl Harbor on 24 May 1955; and, after almost a year of normal operations out of that port, she departed in April for the Marshall Islands. There she participated in the nuclear tests of Operation Redwing. Upon returning to Pearl Harbor, she began an overhaul which lasted until 7 January 1957. Overhaul completed, she conducted refresher training and other exercises until 17 June 1957, when she sailed once more for the Far East.

Silverstein entered Yokosuka on 27 June and remained until 15 July. From there she sailed, via Sasebo, to Chinhae, Korea. At Chinhae, the Republic of Korea's principal naval base, she was visited by the Chief of Naval Operations of the Republic of Korea (ROK) and trained with several ROK Navy ships. By 5 August, she had moved south to the Republic of the Philippines and trained sailors from that nation's navy until the 19th. Returning to Japan via Hong Kong, she made Yokosuka on 30 August and Kobe on 1 September. She put to sea again on 4 September to evade a typhoon and entered Yokosuka again on the 5th.

After six days of convoy screening exercises and 12 days in Yokosuka, the destroyer escort departed Japan for two months' duty in the Marianas Islands. During the latter part of this tour, she struck a reef off Olimarao Island and had to put into Apra Harbor, Guam, for repairs on 20 October. On 9 November at the completion of repairs, she sailed for Pearl Harbor, via Midway Island. On 16 November, she entered homeport and commenced a period of repairs, upkeep, and holiday leave.

==== Collision and sinking of USS Stickleback (SS-415) ====
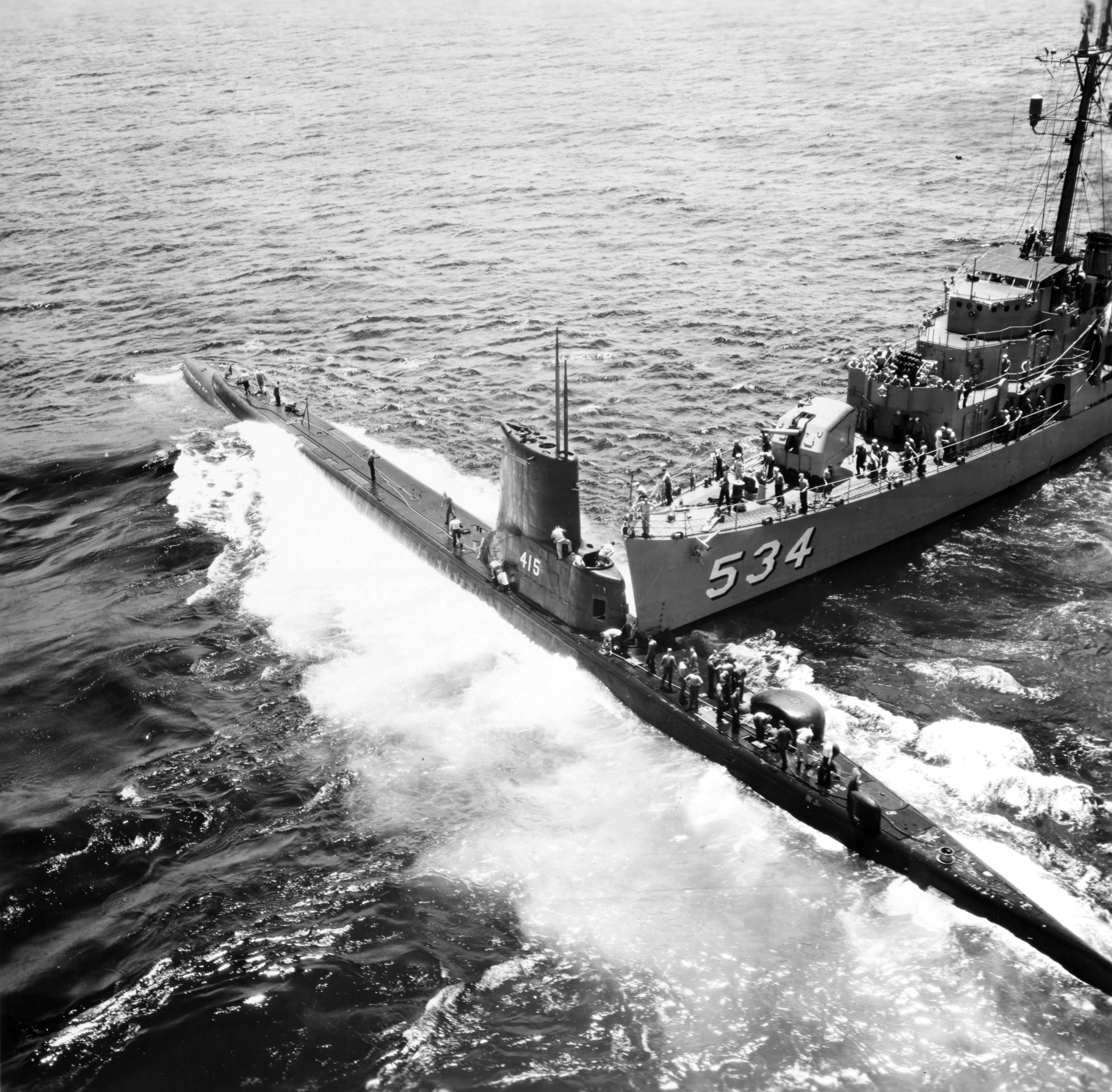
Silverstein collides with USS Stickleback, 29 May 1958.

In early 1958, Silverstein resumed ASW training in the Hawaiian Islands. In May, she suffered an explosion in the depth charge impulse charge locker, and on the 28th, she collided with the submarine USS Stickleback during exercises. The Stickleback had been conducting a simulated torpedo run on the Silverstein when she suffered engine failure, likely due to damage from the depth charge locker explosion. The submarine began to sink while the engineering crew attempted to restart the engines, the sub sank to a depth of 800 feet, which was twice the test depth of a Balao-class submarine. The captain ordered a emergency main ballast tank blow causing the Stickleback to surface directly in the path of the Silverstein. Silverstein, the submarine Sabalo, and the destroyer escort Sturtevant joined in the successful rescue of all 82 men in the submarine's crew. The damage to the Silverstein’s hull was minor, but the Stickleback suffered a large hull breach amidships. However, all efforts to save the submarine itself came to naught; and, at 19:57, she made her last dive. The wreck of the Stickleback was discovered in 2020 by a team of researchers from the Lost 52 Project, which aims to find all of the 52 World War II era submarines that sank. Using naval records of the Stickleback’s last known position they deployed a series of deep-submergence vehicles equipped with sonar equipment to scour the region where the Stickleback sank. After discovering the wreck the team noted it was in relatively good condition, the damage inflicted by the Silverstein’s bow had cleaved the Stickleback in two, but it was otherwise remarkably well-preserved.

In August, Silverstein sailed to the South Pacific. During this cruise, she visited Tahiti, Pago Pago, and Swains Island. From the South Pacific, she moved north to the Central Pacific visiting Eniwetok Atoll and Guam. Returning to Pearl Harbor, via Eniwetok, she reentered her homeport on 18 September 1958. A little over a month later, Silverstein sailed east to San Francisco. She arrived on 1 November and immediately entered the Bethlehem Pacific Coast Steel Shipyard for inactivation overhaul.

=== Decommissioning and fate ===
On 22 January 1959, she moved to the San Francisco Naval Shipyard where, on 30 January 1959, she decommissioned. Silverstein remained at San Francisco, berthed as a unit of the Pacific Reserve Fleet until 1 December 1972 when her name was struck from the Navy List. A year later, on 3 December 1973, her hulk was sold to Levin Metals Corp. of San Jose, California, for scrapping.

== Military awards and honors ==
- Asiatic-Pacific Campaign Medal with two battle stars
- World War II Victory Medal
- Navy Occupation Medal
- National Defense Service Medal
- Korean Service Medal with three battle stars
- Philippine Liberation Medal
- United Nations Korea Medal
