= Lloyd–Howe House =

Historic house in North Carolina, United States

- U.S. National Register of Historic Places
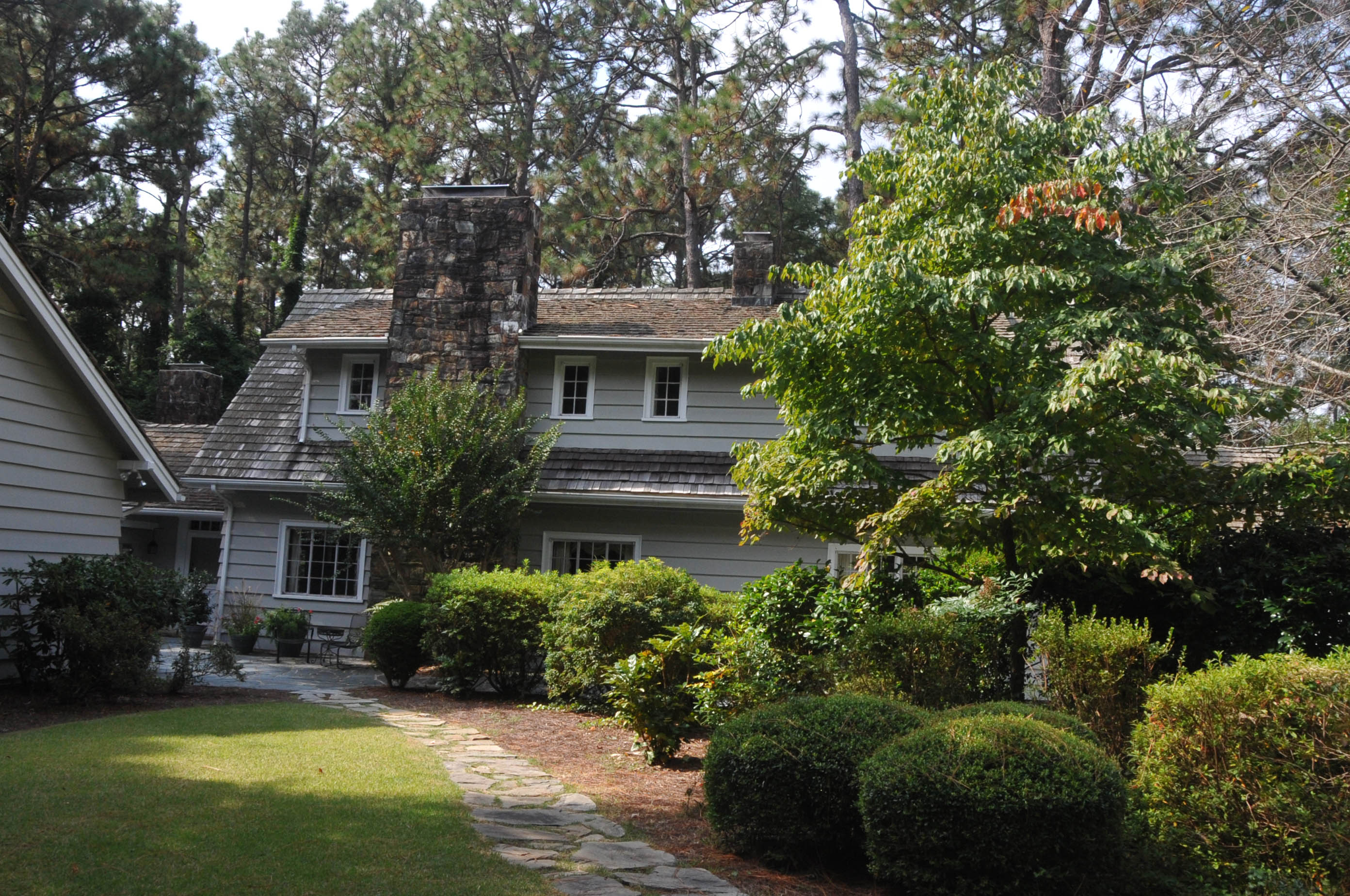
- Lloyd–Howe House, March 2007

- Location within North Carolina Location within the United States
- Location: SW of Pinehurst, near Pinehurst, North Carolina
- Coordinates: 35°11′15″N 79°29′38″W
- Area: 6 acres (2.4 ha)
- Built: 1929
- Built by: Reinecke & Dixon
- Architect: Dixon, Stiles S.
- Architectural style: Cape Cod
- NRHP reference No.: 83001899
- Added to NRHP: September 8, 1983

Lloyd–Howe House, also known as "Anchors Aweigh" and Clarendon Gardens and Howe House, is a historic home located near Pinehurst, Moore County, North Carolina, United States. It was built in 1929, and consists of a 1 1/2-story main block with a gable roof and one-story wings in an irregular configuration. Its style is a variation of the New England Cape Cod and contains 16 rooms over 5,778 square feet. It is sheathed in stained Georgia cypress weatherboards and has chimneys, flues and two terraces built of local bluish-brown Carthage stone.

In 1946, Robert Sturtevant developed landscaping for thirty acres lying southeast of the main house, an area then called Clarendon Gardens.

It was added to the National Register of Historic Places in 1983.
