= USS Stickleback =

Submarine of the United States

Coordinates: 21°27′36″N 157°58′48″W

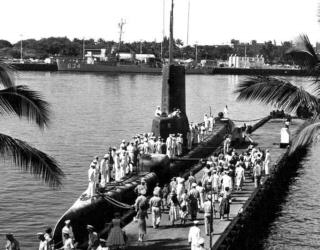
- USS Stickleback (SS-415), after GUPPY conversion

History

United States
- Name: USS Stickleback
- Builder: Mare Island Naval Shipyard
- Laid down: 1 March 1944
- Launched: 1 January 1945
- Commissioned: 29 March 1945
- Decommissioned: 26 June 1946
- Recommissioned: 6 September 1951
- Decommissioned: 14 November 1952
- Recommissioned: 26 June 1953
- Identification: SS-415
- Fate: Sunk in collision with USS Silverstein off Oahu 29 May 1958

General characteristics (World War II)
- Class & type: Balao-class diesel-electric submarine
- Displacement: 1,526 tons (1550 t) surfaced; 2,424 tons (2460 t) submerged
- Length: 311 ft 10 in (95.05 m)
- Beam: 27 ft 4 in (8.33 m)
- Draft: 16 ft 10 in (5.13 m) maximum
- Propulsion: 4 × Fairbanks-Morse Model 38D8-⅛ 10-cylinder opposed piston diesel engines driving electrical generators; 2 × 126-cell Sargo batteries; 4 × high-speed General Electric electric motors with reduction gears; two propellers; 5,400 shp (4.0 MW) surfaced; 2,740 shp (2.0 MW) submerged
- Speed: 20.25 knots (37.50 km/h) surfaced; 8.75 knots (16.21 km/h) submerged
- Range: 11,000 nautical miles (20,000 km) surfaced at 10 knots (19 km/h)
- Endurance: 48 hours at 2 knots (3.7 km/h) submerged; 75 days on patrol
- Test depth: 400 ft (120 m)
- Complement: 10 officers, 70–71 enlisted
- Armament: 10 × 21-inch (533 mm) torpedo tubes; 6 forward, 4 aft; 24 torpedoes; 1 × 5-inch (127 mm) / 25 caliber deck gun; Bofors 40 mm and Oerlikon 20 mm cannon

General characteristics (Guppy IIA)
- Class & type: none
- Displacement: 1,848 tons (1,878 t) surfaced; 2,440 tons (2,479 t) submerged
- Length: 307 ft (94 m)
- Beam: 27 ft 4 in (8.33 m)
- Draft: 17 ft (5.2 m)
- Propulsion: Snorkel added; One diesel engine and generator removed; Batteries upgraded to Sargo II
- Speed: Surfaced: 17.0 knots (31.5 km/h) maximum; 13.5 knots (25.0 km/h) cruising; Submerged: 14.1 knots (26.1 km/h) for ½ hour; 8.0 knots (14.8 km/h) snorkeling; 3.0 knots (5.6 km/h) cruising
- Armament: 10 × 21 inch (533 mm) torpedo tubes; (six forward, four aft); all guns removed

USS Stickleback (SS-415), a Balao-class submarine, was named for the stickleback, a small scaleless fish.

== Construction and launch ==
Her keel was laid down on 1 March 1944 by the Mare Island Navy Yard of Vallejo, California. She was launched on 1 January 1945 sponsored by Mrs. John O.R. Coll, and commissioned on 29 March 1945.

== World War II ==
Stickleback completed outfitting on 26 May and held her shakedown cruise off the California coast. She reported to Commander, Submarines, Pacific Fleet, for duty on 21 June. More modern equipment was installed at Pearl Harbor; and, on 2 August, she arrived at Guam, where she held sea trials for a few more days. She began her first war patrol on 6 August when she departed for the Sea of Japan. She arrived there the following week and began patrolling. However, the atomic bombs had been dropped on Hiroshima and Nagasaki and it was believed the war would end shortly.

Stickleback had only been in the patrol area for two days when the cease-fire order was passed. She remained in the area and, on 21 August, sighted two bamboo rafts containing 19 survivors of a freighter Teihoku Maru which had been sunk ten days before by Jallao (SS-368). They were taken on board for 18 hours, given food, water, medical treatment, and set afloat again a short distance from one of the Japanese islands.

Stickleback returned to Guam on 9 September and sailed for the United States the next day. She arrived at San Francisco, California, on 28 September as a unit of Admiral William F. Halsey's Third Fleet. The submarine participated in the Navy Day celebration in October and, on 2 January 1946, made a voyage to Pearl Harbor. She was decommissioned, on 26 June 1946, at Mare Island and attached to the Pacific Reserve Fleet.

== Korean War ==
Stickleback was recommissioned on 6 September 1946 and served at San Diego, California as a training ship until entering the Mare Island Naval Shipyard on 6 November 1952 for conversion to a snorkel (GUPPY IIA) type submarine. The vessel was back at sea on 26 June 1953 and joined Submarine Squadron 7 at Pearl Harbor.

Stickleback supported the United Nations forces in Korea from February to July 1954 when she returned to Pearl Harbor.

== Foundering ==
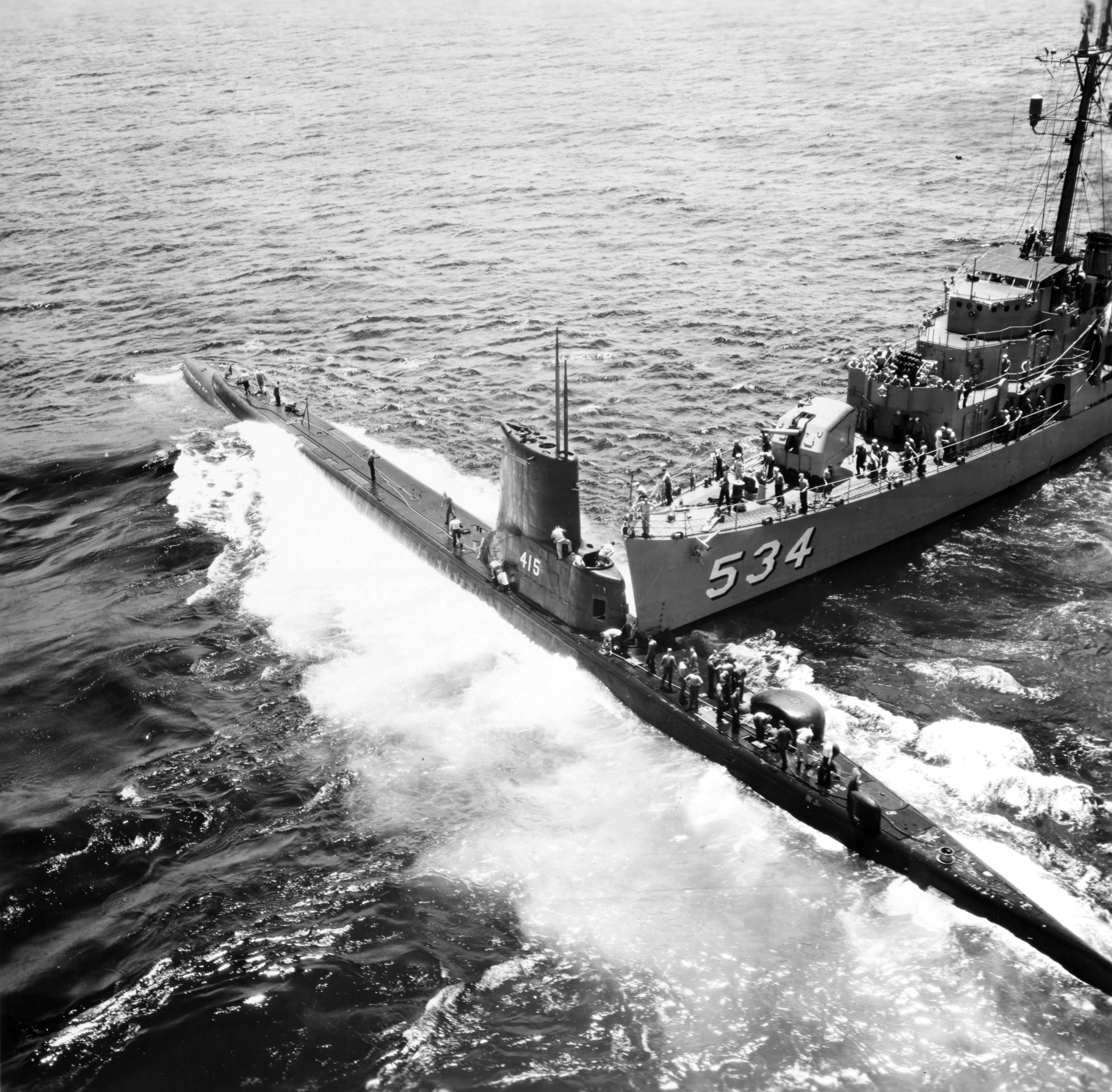
Collision between USS Stickleback (SS-415) and USS Silverstein (DE-534) on 29 May 1958.

For the next four years, the submarine participated in training operations and the development of both defensive and offensive submarine tactics. On 28 May 1958, Stickleback was participating in an antisubmarine warfare exercise with the destroyer escort USS Silverstein and a torpedo retriever in the Hawaiian area. The exercises continued into the afternoon of the next day when the submarine completed a simulated torpedo run on Silverstein. As Stickleback was going to a safe depth, she lost power and broached approximately 200 yards (180 m) ahead of the destroyer escort. Silverstein backed full and put her rudder hard left in an effort to avoid a collision but holed the submarine on her port side.

Stickleback's crew was removed by the torpedo retriever and combined efforts were made by Silverstein, Sabalo, Sturtevant, and Greenlet, to save the stricken submarine. The rescue ships put lines around her, but compartment after compartment flooded and, at 18:57 on 29 May 1958, Stickleback sank in 1,800 fathoms (10,800 ft; 3,292 m) of water.

Stickleback was struck from the Naval Vessel Register on 30 June 1958.

Stickleback was one of four United States Navy submarines lost since the end of World War II. The others were USS Cochino (SS-345), USS Thresher (SSN-593) and USS Scorpion (SSN-589).

Sonar images of her wreckage was made public in March 2020.

== Awards ==
- Asiatic-Pacific Campaign Medal
- World War II Victory Medal
- Navy Occupation Medal with "ASIA" clasp
- National Defense Service Medal
- Korean Service Medal
- United Nations Service Medal

== See also ==
- List of lost United States submarines
