= Lysimeter =

Device that calculates the amount of water dispersed by plants

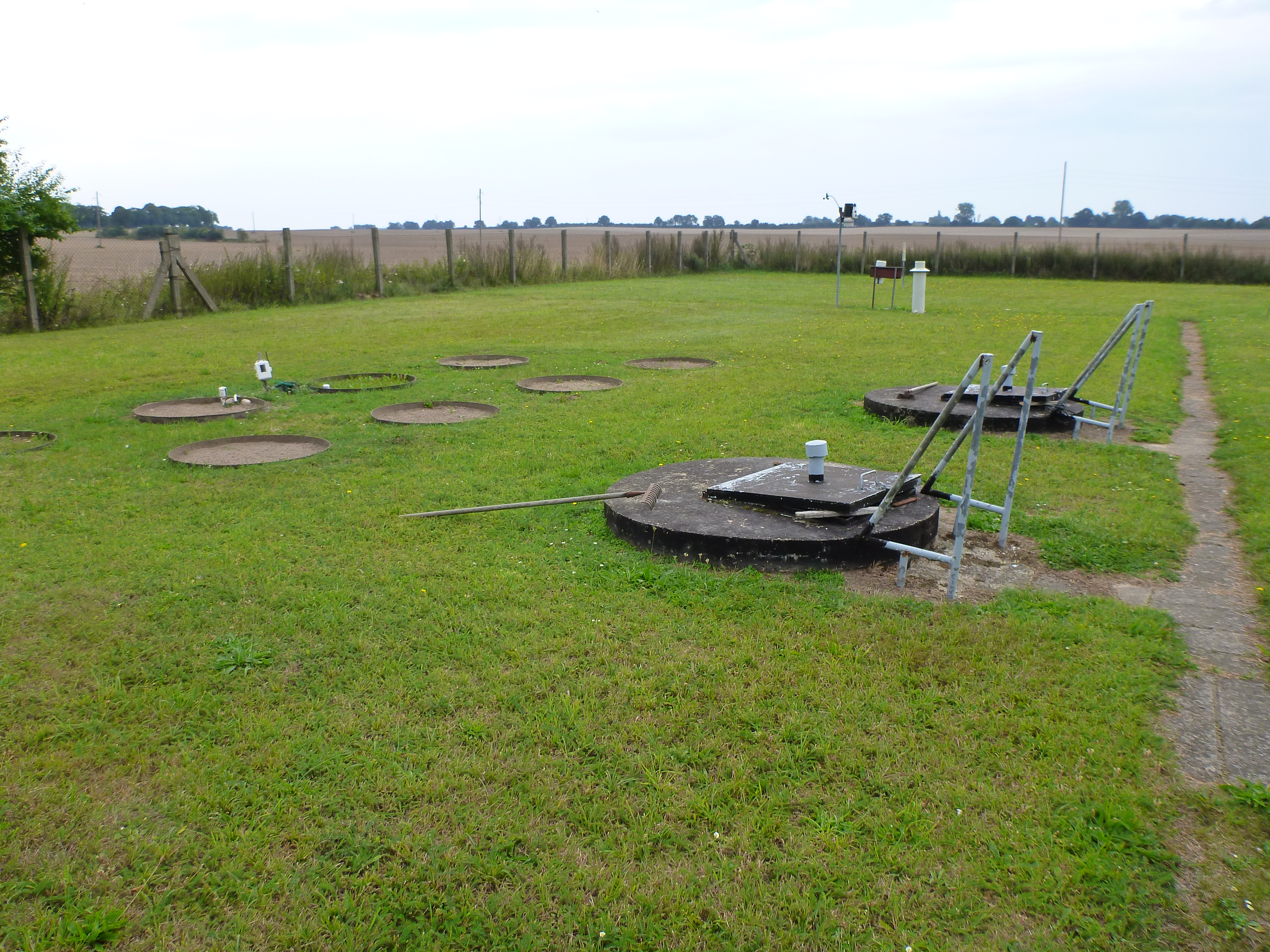
Lysimeter station in Kittendorf, Germany

A field lysimeter or simply lysimeter (from Greek λύσις (loosening) and the suffix -meter) is a container filled with soil, typically of cylindrical shape, which can be used to study the transport of water and material through the soil. This type of lysimeter can be equipped with different measuring probes at different depths (e.g., soil temperature, tensiometer for measuring water tension). The soil contained in the field lysimeter can either be collected as a monolith (i.e., in one piece) or be reconstructed from the different layers present at the sampling site. Most lysimeters contain an opening at the bottom allowing the leachate to be collected and analyzed over time.

Lysimeters can be used to measure the amount of actual evapotranspiration which is released by plants (usually crops or trees). By recording the amount of precipitation that an area receives and the amount lost through the soil, the amount of water lost to evapotranspiration can be calculated. There are multiple types of lysimeters, with each designed for specific purposes; the choice of lysimeter depends on project objectives, parameters to be measured, and the environmental conditions under investigation.

== Types ==
Some types of lysimeters include:

- Weighing Lysimeters
  - Principle: Measures changes in the weight of the lysimeter to determine water balance
  - Operation: The lysimeter is placed on a scale and changes in weight are recorded over time, allowing for the calculation of evaporation, transpiration, and drainage
- Suction Lysimeters
  - Principle: Used negative pressure (suction) to extract soil water for analysis
  - Operation: A porous cup is buried in the soil and a vacuum is applied to extract water from the surrounding soil; collected water can be analyzed for nutrients, contaminants, or other parameters
- Drainage Lysimeters
  - Principle: Collects water that drains through the soil profile
  - Operation: These lysimeters have a collection system to capture water that moved through the soil; collected water is analyzed to study leaching and nutrient transport
- Field Lysimeters
  - Principle: Installed directly in the field to simulate natural soil-plant interaction
  - Operation: The system mimics natural conditions, allowing researchers to study the impact of various factors on soil water movement, nutrient cycling, and plant growth; field lysimeters can be installed with weighted systems to determine water balance
- Greenhouse Lysimeters
  - Principle: Similar to field lysimeters but installed in controlled greenhouse environments
  - Operation: A controlled setting is provided to studying soil-water interactions, allowing researchers to manipulate environmental conditions and monitor plan responses
- Zero Tension Lysimeters
  - Principle: Measured drainage under zero tension conditions
  - Operation: The system is designed to collect water from the soil without the application of suction, allowing researchers to study natural drainage patterns
- Capillary Lysimeters
  - Principle: Utilizes capillary action to collect soil water
  - Operation: Capillary forces draw water into the lysimeter; this type of lysimeter is often used to study water movement in the vadose zone (above the water table)
- Pressure plate lysimeters
  - Principle: Measured soil water retention characteristics
  - Operation: Pressure is applied to the soil to extract water at different tension settings, this helps to determine the soil's ability to retain water

The list above is not comprehensive; there are many types of lysimeters and many ways that lysimetry can be used to understand soil-porewater relationships.

== General usage ==
Schema of a lysimeter station

A lysimeter is most accurate when vegetation is grown in a large soil tank which allows the rainfall input and water lost through the soil to be easily calculated. The amount of water lost by evapotranspiration can be worked out by calculating the difference between the weight before and after the precipitation input.

For farm crops, a lysimeter can represent field conditions well since the device is installed and used outside the laboratory. A weighing lysimeter, for example, reveals the amount of water crops use by constantly weighing a huge block of soil in a field to detect losses of soil moisture (as well as any gains from precipitation). An example of their use is in the development of new xerophytic apple tree cultivars in order to adapt to changing climate patterns of reduced rainfall in traditional apple growing regions.

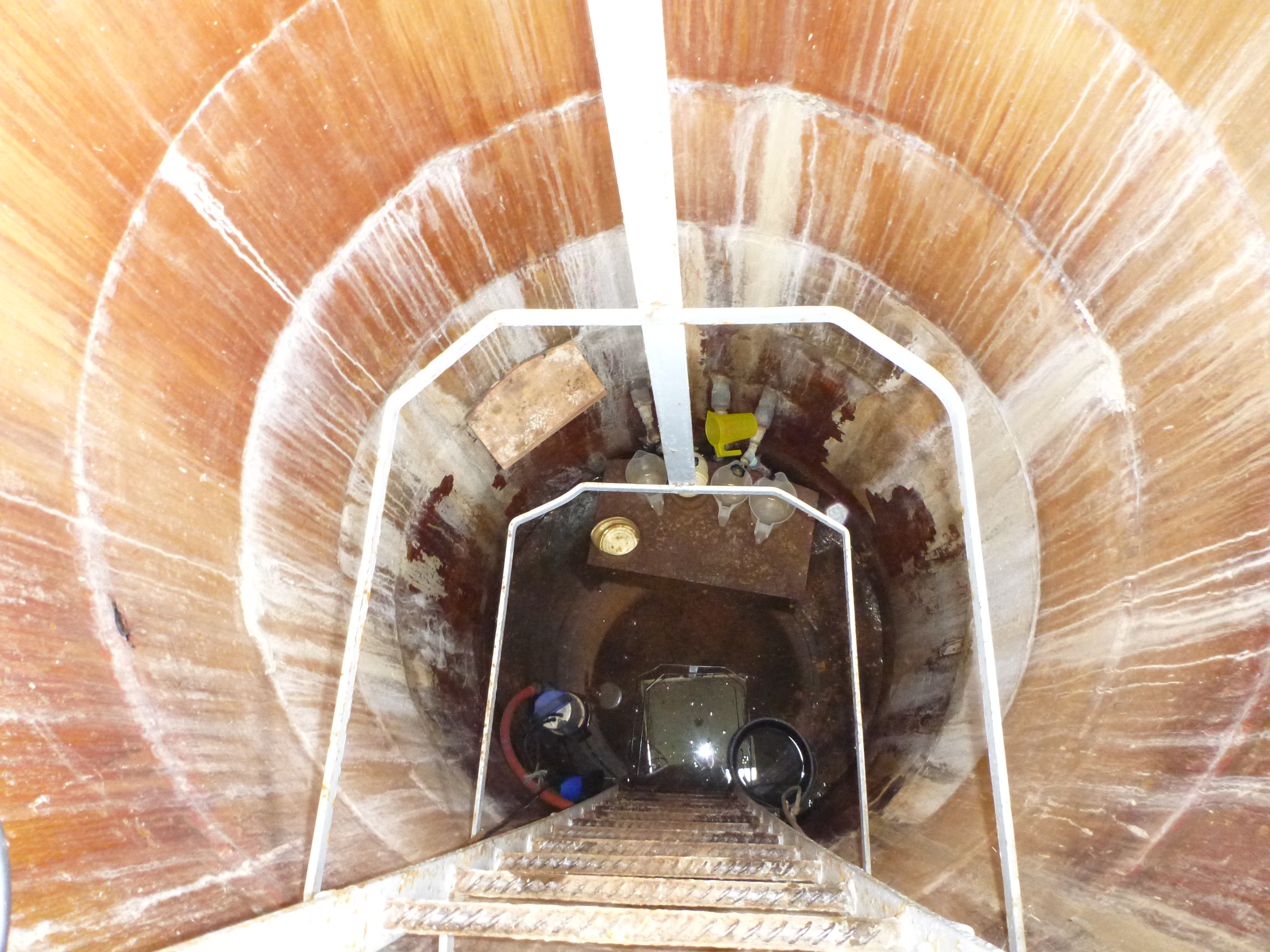
View into the inspection chamber of a lysimeter station

The University of Arizona's Biosphere 2 built the world's largest weighing lysimeters using a mixture of thirty 220,000 and 333,000 lb-capacity (ca. 100,000 and 150,000 kg) column load cells from Honeywell, Inc. as part of its Landscape Evolution Observatory project.

== Use in whole plant physiological phenotyping systems ==
To date, physiology-based, high-throughput phenotyping systems (also known as plant functional phenotyping systems), which, used in combination with soil–plant–atmosphere continuum (SPAC) measurements and fitting models of plant responses to continuous and fluctuating environmental conditions, should be further investigated in order to serve as a phenotyping tool to better understand and characterize plant stress response. In these systems (known also as gravimetric system), plants are placed on weighing lysimeters that measure changes in pot weight at a high frequency. This data is then combined with measurements of environmental parameters in the greenhouse, including radiation, humidity and temperature, as well as soil water conditions. Using pre-measured data including soil weight and initial plant weight, a great deal of phenotypic data can be extracted including data on stomatal conductance, growth rates, transpiration and soil water content and plant dynamic behaviour such as the critical ɵ point, which is the soil water content at which plants start to respond to stress by reducing their stomatal conductance.

The Faculty of Agriculture in the Hebrew University of Jerusalem owns one of the most advanced functional phenotyping system, with more than 500 units screened simultaneously.

== Railway lysimeter ==
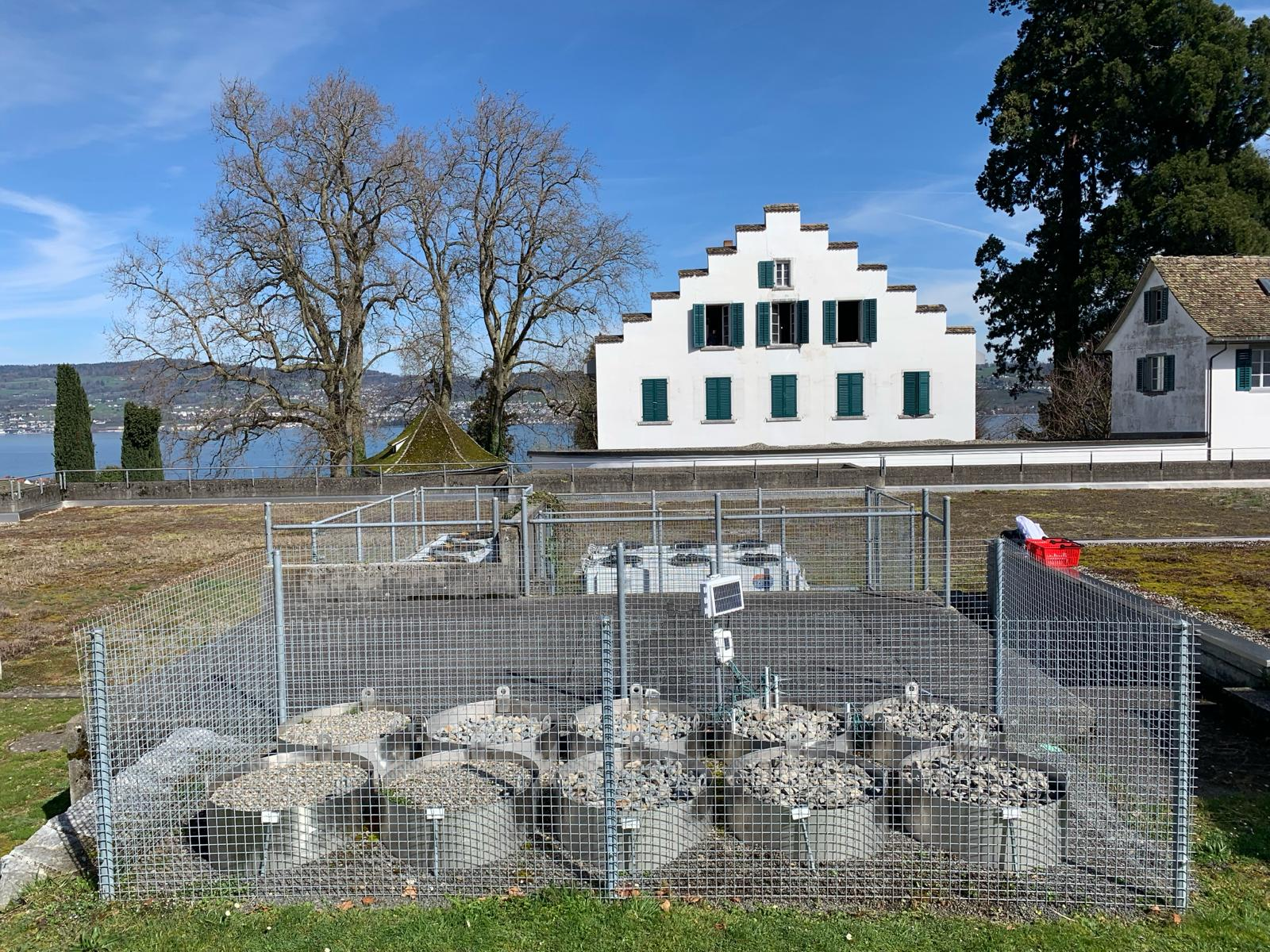
Lysimeter filled with railway soil material in Wädenswil, Switzerland.

Lysimeters can also be used to study degradation patterns of substances in specific types of soils. For example, lysimeters can be filled with material from railways. For instance, in Wädenswil, Switzerland, 10 lysimeters are used to study the degradation of herbicides in the soil of railway tracks. By filling the lysimeters with material from different railway tracks, researchers are able to create conditions that mimic the conditions found in these specific environments.

== History ==
In 1875 Edward Lewis Sturtevant, a botanist from Massachusetts, built the first lysimeter in the United States.
