= John H. Edwards (banker) =

American banker

United States Assistant Secretary of the Treasury
- In office 1906–1908
- President: Theodore Roosevelt
- Preceded by: Horace A. Taylor
- Succeeded by: Louis A. Coolidge

Personal details
- Born: March 9, 1875; South Charleston, Ohio
- Died: May 7, 1955 (aged 80)
- Political party: Republican
- Spouse: Margaret Johnson
- Children: 3

John H. Edwards (March 9, 1875 – May 7, 1955) was an American banker who served as the United States Assistant Secretary of the Treasury under President Theodore Roosevelt

== Early life ==
Edwards was born on March 9, 1875, in South Charleston, Ohio.

== Career ==
Edwards began his career in the U.S. Census Bureau in Washington, D.C., in 1891 to 1892. In 1893, he returned to Ohio to join the Bank of South Charleston. In 1896, he was chosen as the Assistant Secretary of the Ohio Bankers' Association. In 1897 he returned to Washington to become the secretary to Ohio Congressman Walter L. Weaver before becoming the confidential secretary of Postmaster General Henry Clay Payne.

In 1902, he joined the U.S. Treasury Department as private secretary to Treasury Secretary Leslie M. Shaw. In 1906, President Roosevelt appointed the then thirty year-old Edwards Assistant Secretary of the Treasury under George B. Cortelyou, who gave him charge of all of the financial bureaus of the Treasury Department. In 1908, Edwards resigned from Treasury and Louis A. Coolidge, former secretary to Henry Cabot Lodge, was appointed by President Roosevelt as his replacement.

After leaving the Treasury Department, he became the receiver for the New Amsterdam National Bank in New York City. While receiver, he sold bonds and stock of the New York & Cuba Mail Steamship Co., Ft. Wayne & Wabash Valley Traction Co. among others. By October 1908, he was authorizing a divided to shareholders.

== Personal life ==
In 1898, he married Margaret Johnson, daughter of Albanus T. Johnson and Margaret (née Stephenson) Johnson of Washington, D.C. Together they were the parents of three children: John H. Edwards Jr., Mary F. Edwards, and Barbara Edwards.

While receiver, he lived at the Hotel Gotham in New York (today known as The Peninsula) and was a member of the Republican Club of New York and of the Army and Navy Club in Washington.

Edwards died on May 7, 1955, and was buried at Fort Lincoln Cemetery in Brentwood, Maryland.

=== 1914 arrest ===
In August 1914, Edwards was arrested on Park Avenue in New York City by Central Office detectives on an indictment found in Washington, charging desertion and non-support of his wife and three children. Edwards was turned over to U.S. Marshall Henkel and was arraigned before Commissioner Clarence S. Houghton before consenting to return to Washington.
