= Albert D. Sturtevant =

American Navy aviator (1894–1918)

Albert Dillon
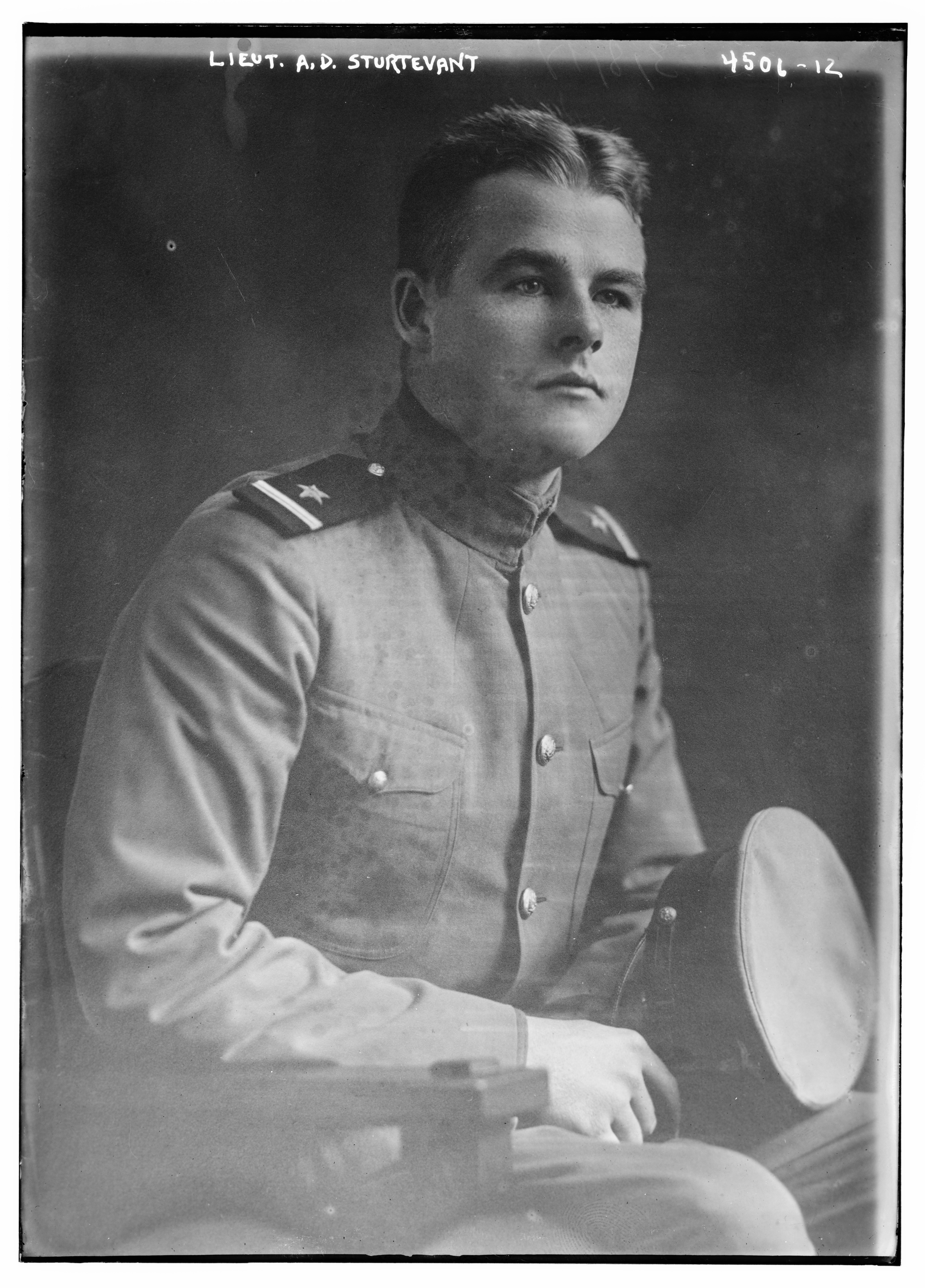
- Albert Dillon Sturtevant in 1918
- Born: May 2, 1894; Washington, D.C., USA
- Died: February 15, 1918 (aged 23); North Sea
- Cause of death: Shot down by German fighters
- Military career
- Allegiance: United States
- Branch: United States Navy
- Service years: 1917-1918
- Rank: Ensign
- Unit: RAF Felixstowe
- Known for: First US aviator to die in battle
- Conflicts: World War I
- Awards: Navy Cross

Albert Dillon Sturtevant (2 May 1894 – 15 February 1918) was an officer in the United States Navy during World War I.

== Biography ==
Sturtevant was born in Washington, D.C., the son of Charles Lyon (1867-1934) and Bessie (Dillon) (1869-1917) Sturtevant.

The duty of Sturtevant's crew was to fly escort for merchantmen crossing the North Sea. On 15 February 1918, Sturtevant was one of an international crew of four in a Curtiss H-12B flying boat. The flight officer that day was Claude Chester Purdy, a Canadian enlisted in the Royal Naval Service. Sturtevant, as second officer, was gunner. Two others in the plane were British air mechanic 1st class Sidney James Hollidge and British boy mechanic Arthur Hector Stephenson. With another plane from the same unit, piloted by a South African named Faux, their assignment was to escort a convoy of ships carrying beef between the Netherlands and Britain. The two aircraft were attacked by a group of ten German seaplanes. The group split in half, with five seaplanes pursuing each of the flying boats. Faux managed to elude his attackers and escaped to the west and England, but Purdy was forced south towards the coast of Belgium. As if the situation were not dire enough, another group of German aircraft, led by Oberleutnant Friedrich Christiansen, air ace, entered the fray. Christiansen shot down the flying boat and it fell in flames into the North Sea. Christiansen later told Sturtevant's father that he circled the area and observed three crew members waving and clinging to the wreckage, but that he was unable to rescue them because it was a dangerous situation. Faux reported the attack at Felixstowe, where there was only one aircraft not otherwise engaged. That aircraft attempted a rescue but was damaged on takeoff. By the time another attempt could be made, any sign of the flying ship and its crew had disappeared.

Sturtevant was the first aviator in either the US Army or the Navy to be brought down in action.

Sturtevant was awarded the Navy Cross posthumously.

== Navy Cross Citation ==
"The President of the United States of America takes pride in presenting the Navy Cross (Posthumously) to Ensign Albert D. Sturtevant, United States Navy, for distinguished and heroic service as an Aviator attached to the Royal Air Force Station at Felixstowe, England, making a great many offensive patrol flights over the North Sea and was shot down when engaged gallantly in combat with a number of enemy planes."

== Legacy ==
Two ships, USS Sturtevant (DD-240), a Clemson-class destroyer, commissioned in 1920 and lost after entering an American minefield her crew was not aware of in April 1942, and USS Sturtevant (DE-239), an Edsall-class destroyer escort, active between 1943 and 1960, have been named after him.
