= Robert Sturtevant =

American landscape architect and iris breeder (1892–1955)

Robert Swan Sturtevant (December 30, 1892 – February 22, 1955) was an American landscape architect and iris breeder. He taught for many years at the Lowthorpe School of Landscape Architecture, and he helped to found the American Iris Society.

== Early life ==
Sturtevant was born in Framingham, Massachusetts on December 30, 1889. He was the only child of noted agronomist Edward Lewis Sturtevant, the first director of the New York State Agricultural Experiment Station, and his second wife, Hattie (née Mann) Sturtevant. He had four half-siblings from his father's first marriage to Hattie's sister Mary Elizabeth (née Mann) Sturtevant.

Sturtevant was especially close to his much older half-sister Grace, who would become a noted iris breeder. In 1901, they co-purchased an estate in Massachusetts, Wellesley Gardens, which Grace made the center of her iris-breeding operations and where she educated her half-brother in horticulture.

Sturtevant attended Wellesley High School and Milton Academy. He graduated from Harvard College with an A.B. in 1912 and went on to get a master's degree in landscape architecture from Harvard in 1916. Between 1916 and 1918, he worked as a landscape architect for the firm of Frederick Law Olmsted.

== Career ==
When America entered World War I, he served overseas in the field artillery, reaching the rank of corporal. After his discharge in 1919, he became an instructor at the Lowthorpe School of Landscape Architecture. In 1927, he became the school's director. Although he only headed the school for a few years, he remained on the faculty for 25 years.

When the American Iris Society was founded in 1920, Sturtevant became its first secretary and drafted the society's constitution. He also served as the first editor of the American Iris Society Bulletin, a position he held for 14 years. He edited the AIS's first book, The Iris: An Ideal Hardy Perennial (1947).

Sturtevant was a member of both the Royal Horticultural Society of Great Britain and the American Horticultural Society.

Sturtevant moved to Nashville, Tennessee, in 1933 and joined a landscape architecture firm. In 1935, he created a landscape design for Orton Plantation in Brunswick County, North Carolina, not all of which was implemented and only some of which survives today. In 1946, he developed landscaping for thirty acres of the Lloyd–Howe House estate, an area southeast of the main house known as the Clarendon Gardens.

== Personal life ==
In 1926 Sturtevant was married to Margaret Coolidge (1899–1979), a daughter of Helen (née Pickerill) Coolidge and Louis A. Coolidge, the former Assistant Secretary of the Treasury during the presidencies of Theodore Roosevelt and William Howard Taft. Together, they were the parents of two sons:

- Roger van Deren Sturtevant (1930–1950), who was killed in the Korean War while serving with the U.S. Marines.
- David Mann Sturtevant (1932–1998)

Sturtevant died in a house fire in Nashville on February 22, 1955.
