= Ethel Anson Peckham =

Botanist (1879-1965)

Ethel Anson (Steel) Peckham (1879–1965) was an American horticulturist and botanical artist who bred plants that grow from bulbs and rhizomes such as iris and daffodil. She was a founding member and early director of the American Iris Society (AIS), editor of its first major checklists, and author of its iris-judging rules. She bred iris herself and is credited with helping to introduce a new class, the miniature tall bearded iris. She is one of only a dozen people to have received the AIS Gold Medal, the society's highest honor, and she was also awarded the Gold Medal of the British Iris Society for her paintings of iris.

== Biography ==
Ethel Anson Steel was born in Bethlehem, Pennsylvania, on November 30, 1879, to William White Garrigues Steel and Juliet (Rauch) Steel. She was educated at private schools in England.

In 1906, she married Wheeler Hazard Peckham, with whom she had two children, Content and Anson. They lived in New Rochelle, New York.

In 1920 Peckham helped to establish both the American Iris Society and its first trial garden, which was located at the New York Botanical Garden (NYBG). She continued to be involved with both organizations throughout her life. At NYBG, she was named honorary curator of both the iris and narcissus collections in 1927. She was a contributor to the NYBG's Journal and also to another of its publications, Addisonia.

At the AIS, she held the post of director for a decade (1925–35), during which period she also had charge of the AIS test gardens. She took over management of the AIS's preliminary checklists and compiled and edited the monumental 1929 and 1939 lists, comprising 12,000 and 19,000 species, cultivars, and their synonyms, respectively. This was an important undertaking at the time, when irises were growing in popularity as American garden plants but their nomenclature was in disarray.

Peckham also served to different times as the society's registrar and its recorder, and she developed the AIS's first set of rules for judging iris, thus making it possible for iris competitions to be held using nationally agreed standards.

Peckham was one of the first breeders to carefully study dwarf irises and brought a thousand dwarf iris into the New York Botanical Garden. She is credited with helping to develop a new class, the miniature tall bearded irises, which she appreciated for their potential as cut flowers. She termed them 'table irises' and provided the first description of the class. She introduced at least five new cultivars of intermediate bearded irises and at least 60 of tall bearded irises.

She served for a time as the director of the Horticultural Society of New York.

She also lectured around the country on horticultural topics and contributed to gardening magazines.

She died February 23, 1965.

== Honors and legacy ==
In 1940, Peckham became the third person to be awarded the AIS Gold Medal, and she remains one of only a dozen people ever to have received the society's highest honor. She also received the Gold Medal of the British Iris Society for her paintings of beardless iris.

In her honor, the Ethel Anson S. Peckham Award for Historic Iris was established in 2000 by the AIS.

Some of Peckham's paintings and copper engravings of irises are held by the American Iris Society. Her iris paintings are included in the 2006 book Classic Irises and the Men and Women Who Created Them.

The New York Public Library holds a few of her papers as part of the Chesebrough-Peckeham Family Papers collection.
