= Louise Beebe Wilder =

American author and horticulturalist

Louise Beebe Wilder (January 30, 1878 – April 20, 1938) was an American gardening writer and designer whose books are now considered classics of their era.

== Biography ==
Louise Beebe was born to a well-to-do family in Baltimore, Maryland in 1878. She showed an early interest in gardening.

In 1902, she married architect Walter Robb Wilder, and the couple moved to Pomona, New York, where she transformed the rural property (known as Balderbrae), (Note: Wilder's second book, Colour in My Garden, is about Balderbrae, and the illustrations in the 1918 edition show many details of the garden design. In the 1980s, Balderbrae was renovated with a large new main building, but Wilder's original house (a stone cottage) and some of her landscaping elements still exist. See Joni Webb, "What a Mess: Balderbrae Then and Now!!!", Cote de Texas website, Oct. 12, 2010; accessed Dec. 22, 2015.) adding pathways, a pair of half-moon fountains, a grape arbor, terraces, flowering trees, a walled garden, and an herb bed. Later, they moved a bit further south to the village of Bronxville, where she designed Station Plaza and founded a local Working Gardeners Club (1925). She designed residential gardens across the county; her philosophy, influenced by the aesthetic of British gardener Gertrude Jekyll, was to create something "formal in design but most informal in execution".

Wilder wrote ten books about her experiences as a gardener that were popular for offering clear, explicit advice rather than flowery nature writing. She also wrote for newspapers and gardening and shelter magazines such as Horticulture, House & Garden, and the New York Times. In particular, she took up the challenge of adapting Jekyll's aesthetic—developed for a substantially different climate and range of plant species—to the needs of American gardeners. The title of her second book, Colour in My Garden, deliberately echoes Jekyll's influential 1908 book Colour in the Flower Garden.

Wilder's "socio-botanical commentaries"—as author Michael Pollan termed them—captured the spirit of a moment in America when suburban gardening and its attendant forms of landscape design were on the rise and an older, more formal style of large estate garden was in decline. A New York Times editor called her a Romantic, but one "with a strong vein of scientific curiosity that she exercised on a domestic scale.” Another New York Times editor, after noting that she was conversant with both classic British and recent American horticultural literature, praised her for the sharpness of her field observations. Her books—especially Colour in My Garden—are now considered classics, and in 2001 some were reissued as a four-volume collection, The Louise Beebe Wilder Gardener’s Library: Four Classic Books by America’s Greatest Garden Writer.

Wilder also served on the board of the New York Botanical Garden.

Walter Wilder died by suicide in 1934. Wilder died April 20, 1938.

== Awards ==
She was honored with the Garden Club of America's Gold Medal for Horticultural Achievement in 1937.

== Publications ==
- My Garden (1916)
- Colour in My Garden (1918; limited edition of 1500 with color plates by artist Anna Winegar)
- Adventures in My Garden and Rock Garden (1923)
- Pleasures and Problems of a Rock Garden (1928)
- Adventures in a Suburban Garden (1931)
- The Fragrant Path (1932)
- The Rock Garden (1933)
- What Happens in My Garden (1935)
- Adventures with Hardy Bulbs (1936)
- The Garden in Color (1937)
