= USS Sturtevant (DD-240) =

Clemson-class destroyer

Coordinates: 24°45.857′N 82°1.174′W

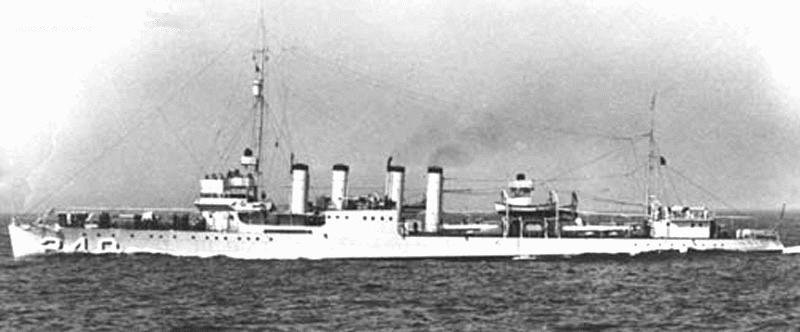
- USS Sturtevant underway, date and place unknown.

History

United States
- Name: USS Sturtevant
- Namesake: Albert D. Sturtevant
- Builder: New York Shipbuilding
- Laid down: 23 November 1918
- Launched: 29 July 1920
- Commissioned: 21 September 1920
- Stricken: 8 May 1942
- Fate: Sunk by mines off Key West, 26 April 1942

General characteristics
- Class & type: Clemson-class destroyer
- Displacement: 1,215 long tons (1,234 t)
- Length: 314 ft 4 in (95.81 m)
- Beam: 31 ft 8 in (9.65 m)
- Draft: 9 ft 10 in (3.00 m)
- Installed power: 26,500 shp (19,800 kW)
- Propulsion: 2 × geared steam turbines; 2 × shafts
- Speed: 35 kn (40 mph; 65 km/h)
- Range: 4,900 nmi (5,600 mi; 9,100 km) at 15 kn (17 mph; 28 km/h)
- Complement: 130 officers and enlisted
- Armament: 4 × 4 in (100 mm) guns, 1 × 3 in (76 mm) anti-aircraft gun, 12 × 21 inch (533 mm) torpedo tubes

USS Sturtevant (DD-240) was a Clemson-class destroyer in the United States Navy during World War II. She was the first ship named for Albert D. Sturtevant.

Sturtevant was laid down on 23 November 1918 and launched on 29 July 1920 by the New York Shipbuilding Corporation; sponsored by Mrs. Curtis Ripley Smith; and commissioned at the Philadelphia Navy Yard on 21 September 1920.

== Inter-war period ==
Sturtevant sailed to Newport, Rhode Island, and thence proceeded to New York City. On 30 November, she departed New York to join the United States Naval Forces, European Waters. She reached Gibraltar on 10 December, and after four days continued on to the Adriatic Sea. On the 19th, she arrived at her new base, Split on the Croatian coast (then in Kingdom of Yugoslavia). For the next six months, she conducted various missions from Split to the ports on the Adriatic littoral.

On 16 June 1921, the destroyer was reassigned from the Adriatic detachment to the Constantinople detachment, and, three days later commenced docking and overhaul at Constantinople. During this assignment, Sturtevant conducted drills in the Sea of Marmara, between the twin straits, the Dardanelles and the Bosphorus, and operated in the Black Sea. She visited Samsun, Turkey; Burgas, Bulgaria; and Sulina and Brăila on the coast of Romania. From 25 October to 28 November, she flew the flag of Admiral Mark L. Bristol. Following this duty, the ship visited the ports of Beirut and Jaffa and then Alexandria, Egypt, and the Isle of Rhodes. In late December, she returned to Turkey at Samsun, thence to Constantinople in January 1922, before reentering the Black Sea to visit southern Russia.

From 1921 to 1923, the Russian Civil War and a drought brought a great famine to Russia, particularly to the usually food-rich Volga region of southern Russia. America responded with nearly 1,000,000 short tons (910,000 t) of food which the Bolsheviks accepted, often as surreptitiously as possible. Sturtevant investigated potential ports of debarkation in southern Russia for the supplies soon to be shipped by the American Relief Administration. To this end, she visited Odessa, Sevastopol, Novorossiysk, Theodosia, and Yalta between early February and mid-April. Thereafter, through the end of the year, she made voyages across the Black Sea to various Russian ports in conjunction with the relief operation. She stopped at numerous other foreign ports on the voyages, including Samsun, Trebizond, and Mudanya, Turkey. From July–October, she made a round-trip voyage back to the U.S., during which she was overhauled at the New York Navy Yard and exercised out of Yorktown, Virginia. On 1 October, Sturtevant was ordered back to the eastern Mediterranean and, the following day, got underway for Gibraltar. She arrived there on the 14th and continued on to Turkey, reaching Mudania on the 27th. For the next seven months, the destroyer visited the ports of the eastern Mediterranean and those along the coast of the Black Sea. In addition to ports of call of the previous cruises, she visited Varna, Bulgaria; Mersina and Smyrna, Turkey; Piraeus, Greece; and Naples, Italy. From the latter port, she sailed for Gibraltar in late May 1923, and by 12 June was back at the Navy Yard in New York. She operated along the Atlantic seaboard through the end of the year, conducting gunnery exercises in October at the southern drill grounds off Virginia. In November, the ship paid an Armistice Day visit to Baltimore. Three days before the end of the year, Sturtevant became flagship of Division 41, Squadron 14, Scouting Fleet.

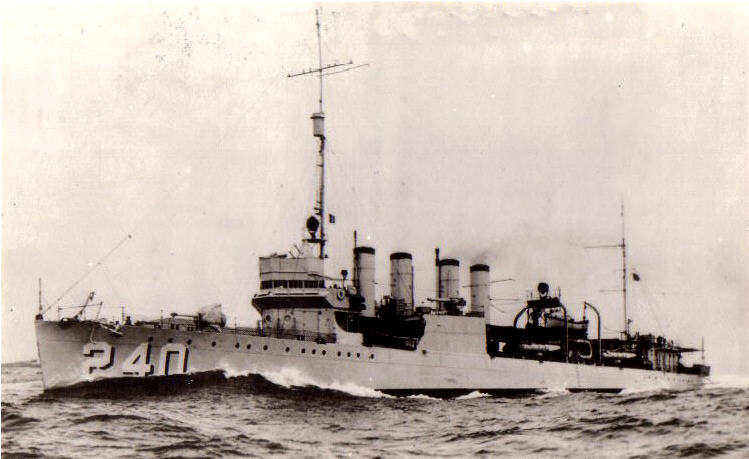
USS Sturtevant at sea, date and place unknown

In early January, Sturtevant proceeded to the Panama Canal Zone to participate in a war problem with the Scouting Fleet. At the end of the month, she sailed with the Fleet, via Culebra Island, to Guantanamo Bay, Cuba, and the British West Indies, conducting tactical exercises along the way. In May, the destroyer returned north and operated along the east coast for the remainder of the year. In January 1925, Sturtevant again headed south. After a month and a half of operations in the Caribbean, she transited the Panama Canal and entered the Pacific. She visited San Diego and San Francisco in California in April before getting underway for the Hawaiian Islands. From late April-mid-June, the ship participated in a joint Army-Navy war problem simulating the attempt of an enemy force to capture the island of Oahu. On 11 June, she set a course for San Diego and arrived on the 17th. The destroyer started on her return voyage to the Atlantic on the 22nd and reached New York City on 16 July. She cruised the Atlantic coast until mid-October, and then proceeded south for winter maneuvers out of Guantanamo Bay, Cuba. Transiting the Panama Canal in late January 1926, she participated in fleet exercises on the Pacific side. Returning to the Atlantic side of the isthmus to resume drills and exercises in the vicinity of Cuba, Sturtevant steamed north to Boston during the first week in May.

From May 1926 to January 1931, Sturtevant continued to operate with the Atlantic Fleet in Destroyer Division 41 (DesDiv 41), Destroyer Squadron 14 (DesRon 14). Each year summer operations along the north and central Atlantic coast of the U.S. were alternated with winter maneuvers in the warm waters of the Caribbean Sea and the Gulf of Mexico. During the fall of 1930, she was assigned Charleston, South Carolina as her homeport, but was ordered north again in January 1931 for decommissioning. On 30 January 1931, Sturtevant was placed out of commission at Philadelphia. She was recommissioned there on 9 March 1932, and on 30 April reported for duty to the Commander, Special Service Squadron at Coco Solo in the Canal Zone. For the next two years, the destroyer plied waters of the Gulf and the Caribbean, supporting the activities of the marines ashore in Nicaragua, Haiti, Cuba, and other Latin American republics. Early in 1934, she left the Special Service Squadron to rejoin the destroyers of the Scouting Force. During this tour of duty, she was home ported at Norfolk, Virginia.

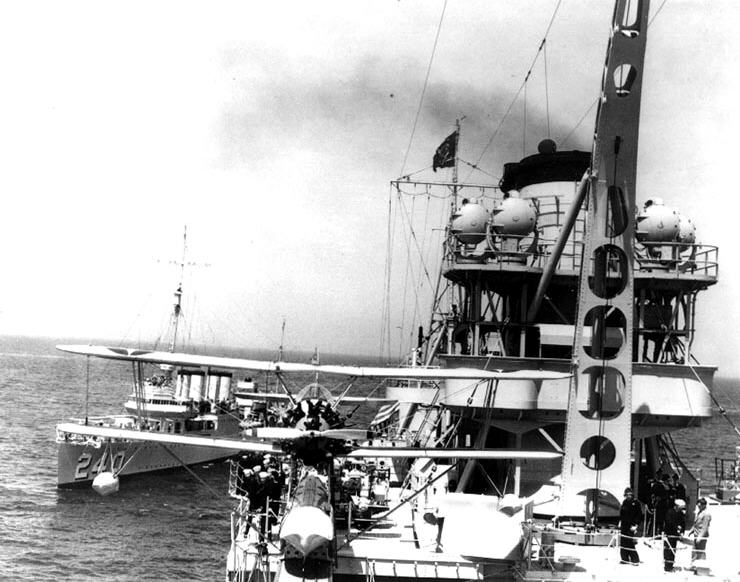
On board heavy cruiser Indianapolis looking aft from the forward superstructure as Sturtevant comes alongside, during the Presidential fleet review off New York City on 31 May 1934.

== World War II ==
In the latter half of 1935, the ship was reassigned to the Battle Force, located in the Pacific. After operating out of San Diego until 20 November, she was decommissioned once again. On 26 September 1939, Sturtevant was recommissioned once more. By mid-1940, she was back in the Atlantic escorting convoys and conducting Neutrality Patrols along the eastern seaboard. The destroyer operated out of Norfolk, in the North Atlantic until early March 1942, then escorted a convoy from New York to the Canal Zone. There she reported for duty to the Commander, Caribbean Sea Frontier, screening convoys between the various ports of the Caribbean until late April.

== Convoys escorted ==
Convoy	Escort Group	Dates	Notes
HX 155		18-25 Oct 1941	from Newfoundland to Iceland prior to US declaration of war
ON 31		4-15 Nov 1941	from Iceland to Newfoundland prior to US declaration of war
HX 162		29 Nov-7 Dec 1941	from Newfoundland to Iceland prior to US declaration of war
HX 169		10-18 Jan 1942	from Newfoundland to Iceland
ON 59		3-5 Feb 1942	from Iceland to Newfoundland

== Fate ==
On 26 April 1942, she departed Key West in company with a convoy. Just over two hours out of port, a violent explosion lifted Sturtevant's stern from the water, but caused no apparent damage. Thinking herself under submarine attack, the destroyer dropped two depth charge barrages. About a minute after she dropped the second barrage of charges, a second detonation rocked the ship. She began to settle rapidly, but on an even keel. Minutes later, a third explosion ripped her keel apart beneath the after deckhouse. The midships section sank immediately, and the stern settled soon thereafter. The bow, curiously, remained above water for several hours. Finally, however, all but the crow's nest disappeared beneath the waves. Sturtevant went down off Key West about 8 mi (13 km) north of the Marquesas Keys. Fifteen of her crew were lost with the ship.

Sturtevant lies as two sections in 60 ft (18 m) of water.

It was later determined that Sturtevant passed through an American-laid minefield of whose existence the crew had not been notified. Her name was struck from the Naval Vessel Register on 8 May 1942.
