= Kashiwabara =

Kashiwabara is a Japanese surname, meaning "oak field". Notable people with the surname include:

- Emperor Go-Kashiwabara
- Shuji Kashiwabara
- Takashi Kashiwabara
- Yoshie Kashiwabara
- Michiko Kashiwabara

== See also ==
- Kashiwabara Station
- Kashiwabara-juku
- Shinano, Nagano, created by the merger of Kashiwabara and Fujisato
- Severo-Kurilsk, the town in the Kuril Islands known as Kashiwabara during Japanese rule
