= Grace Sturtevant =

Early 20th century iris breeder

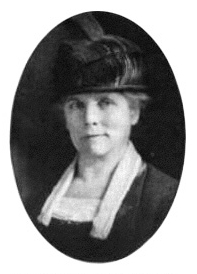
- Photograph of Grace Sturtevant from 1921.
- Born: 1865; Boston, Massachusetts
- Died: 1947 (aged 81–82)
- Occupations: Iris breeder, horticulturalist
- Father: Edward Lewis Sturtevant
- Relatives: Robert Sturtevant (half-brother)

Grace Sturtevant (1865–1947) was an early 20th century iris breeder and horticulturalist who has been called "America's first lady of iris." She was a founding member of the American Iris Society.

== Early life and education ==
Grace Sturtevant was born in Boston, Massachusetts, in 1865, one of four children of noted agronomist Edward Lewis Sturtevant (first director of the New York State Agricultural Experiment Station) and Mary Elizabeth (Mann) Sturtevant. Grace's mother died when she was 12; her father remarried in 1883, to Mary Elizabeth's sister Hattie. Grace was close to her much younger half-brother from this second marriage, Robert Sturtevant, who also became an iris fancier as well as a landscape architect. Grace had artistic ability and as a young woman illustrated some of her father's papers on peppers and sweet potatoes.

== Career ==
E. Lewis Sturtevant died in 1898, and in 1901 Grace Sturtevant and her half-brother Robert jointly bought a property named Wellesley Gardens in Massachusetts. In 1910, Grace began hybridizing irises, beginning with varieties imported from Europe, and in 1912, her first known iris cross flowered. By 1915, Wellesley Gardens became a showcase of iris plantings and a popular local destination during bloom season. In 1917, Grace took three of her hybrids— the yellow 'Afterglow' and 'Shekinah', and the lavender 'B.Y. Morrison' (named in honor of horticulturist Benjamin Y. Morrison, the first director of the U.S. National Arboretum)—to the Massachusetts Horticultural Exhibition, where they all won medals. This success laid the cornerstone of her reputation as a notable iris breeder.

Sturtevan established a commercial plant nursery, Glen Road Iris Gardens near Wellesley Farms, Massachusetts. Between 1917 and 1920, Grace was very active as a plant breeder, introducing numerous new hybrids and issuing a commercial catalog for the first time in 1918. Other iris experts helped in the selection of varieties for her catalog, especially the British iris breeder Arthur J. Bliss, who in 1926 would name an iris 'Grace Sturtevant' in her honor.

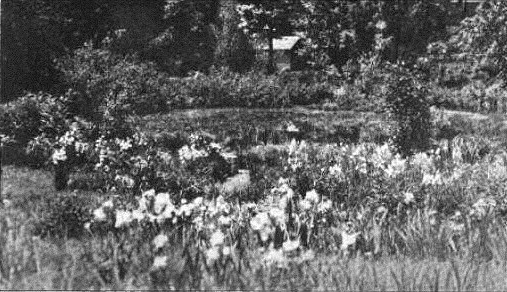
View towards the pond at Wellesley Farms, 1921.

Sturtevant was interested in the genetics of iris and in particular by the inheritance of color, which she recognized as a key factor attracting gardeners to the genus. In a period when little work was being done in iris breeding, Grace's efforts greatly expanded the color range of yellow-tinged irises. For example, she envisioned the possibility of developing a tall yellow bearded iris from Iris pallida that could thrive in southern California where many older yellows descended from Iris variegata did not prosper. Out of this breeding program, she developed the award-winning 'Afterglow' and 'Shekinah', as well as 'Gold Imperial' (1924) and the deep-yellow 'Primrose' (1925). 'Shekinah' was praised as the best yellow iris of its day and made a list of the top 25 American irises in 1925. Most iris breeders who have worked with yellow irises since then have used it somewhere in their lineage.

Other successful introductions during the 1910s and 1920s included the popular pink-shaded 'Dream' (1918) and 'Wild Rose' (1920), the lavender 'Queen Caterina' (1918), and 'Taj Mahal', considered the best white for many years. Her cultivars ranged from the tall bearded types through intermediate and dwarf varieties and Siberian iris.

Sturtevant expressed her general philosophy of iris breeding as follows: "Good substance and form, attractive coloring and above all, a pleasing balance of the whole are prime requirements; height, branching and size (qualities which give balance) are merely desirable. New introductions must be distinct, preferably in color as that receives general acknowledgment." She has been praised for the integrity of her approach to iris breeding, in several instances withdrawing cultivars from circulation if they did not live up to her standards. In 1932, when the American Iris Society Symposium issued new iris breeding standards, Grace suggested to growers that they discard nearly one in ten of her past introductions for a variety of reasons including weak growth, poor form, common color, or insufficient individuality.

In 1920, Grace wrote in the Gardener's Chronicles that registration of new plant varieties was important in the United States. She further suggested that awards should be given to irises that thrive in gardens in preference to those seen at exhibitions.

Grace was a founding member of the American Iris Society. In early 1920, she wrote a brief article in The Flower Grower urging that "it is high time that some central body should gather together information on Iris matters whether it is the history of our garden favorites, the records of our present varieties or the opportunities for the future... Who, as an individual, can tell which [variety] is worthwhile for his small garden? Many varieties both old and new, should be thrown into the discard and what but an association may do this without prejudice and with authority?" In this article, she announced the upcoming meeting in New York at which the AIS would actually be formed.

In 1935, Grace was the first recipient of the AIS's gold medal for outstanding service, which has only been given out around a dozen times in the society's nearly one-hundred-year history. She also was awarded the British Iris Society's Foster Memorial Plaque in 1938. Due to declining health, she sold Wellesley Gardens in 1945, two years before her death in 1947.

== See also ==
- Timeline of women in science
