= John Caspar Wister =

American horticulturist (1887–1982)

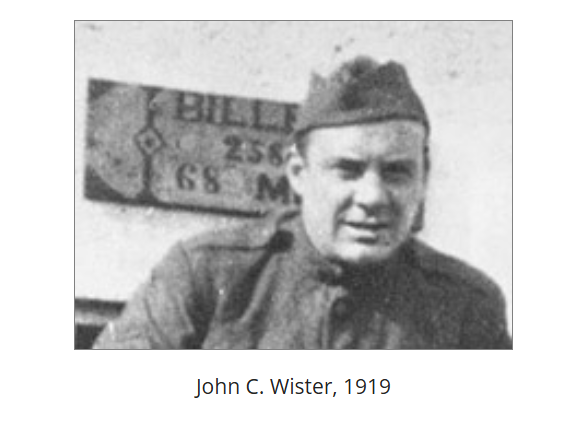
- Born: March 9, 1887; Philadelphia, Pennsylvania, U.S.
- Died: December 27, 1982 (aged 95); Swarthmore, Pennsylvania, U.S.
- Resting place: Laurel Hill Cemetery, Philadelphia, Pennsylvania, U.S.
- Education: Harvard University; Rutgers University
- Spouse: Gertrude Smith

John Caspar Wister (March 19, 1887 – December 27, 1982) was an American horticulturalist known as the Dean of American Horticulture. He founded and served as the first director of the American Iris Society from 1920 to 1934, as director emeritus of the Arthur Hoyt Scott Horticultural Foundation and the John J. Tyler Arboretum, as well as secretary of the American Rose Society and the Pennsylvania Horticultural Society for 24 years. He authored or edited dozens of books and over 500 articles on horticulture. He is one of the most highly honored horticulturist in the United States and the first recipient of the four major horticultural awards: the Liberty Hyde Bailey Medal, the Scott Garden and Horticultural Award, the A.P. Saunders Memorial Medal, and the Honor and Achievement Award of the American Lilac Society.

== Early life and education ==
Wister was the youngest of five children born to William Rotch Wister and Mary Rebecca Eustis in the Germantown neighborhood of Philadelphia. As a child, he learned about horticulture on the 10-acre Germantown family estate, also named Wister, located adjacent to Belfield estate owned by his grandparents.

In 1909, Wister graduated from Harvard University. From 1909 to 1910 he attended graduate school at Harvard's School of Landscape Architecture, and attended agriculture and horticulture at Rutgers University from 1913 to 1914. He worked as a plantsman for landscape architecture firms in New York and Philadelphia. He enlisted on July 10, 1917, as a private in the Army.

Wister trained at the University of Pennsylvania and at Augusta Arsenal before serving in Jonchery, France, with Advance Ordnance Depot 4 during World War I. According to letters he wrote to his family during the war, Wister served most of his time in various ordnance departments, being promoted to Sergeant of Ordnance in November 1917. He visited Kew Gardens in London to view the collection of plants and flowers and met with several famous European horticulturalists during his service. He would often send plants back to Arthur Hoyt Scott, noted garden enthusiast, whom he met in 1915. He was honorably discharged as a Sergeant of Ordnance from the Army on May 10, 1919.

== Career ==
Wister helped organize the American Iris Society in 1920 and served as its first president for 14 years. He helped plan the layout of the Presby Memorial Iris Gardens in Montclair, New Jersey, and designed the landscape at the Stenton mansion in Philadelphia.

His research in cross-breeding produced hundreds of new hybrid species of common plants and flowers. He contributed to the horticulture on the campus of Swarthmore College, where he worked for more than 50 years. Swarthmore College established the Scott Arboretum in recognition of alumnus Arthur Hoyt Scott, the second president of Scott Paper Company, as well as the Arthur Hoyt Scott Horticultural Foundation. Wister was named the foundation's first director in 1930. The Foundation's 240-acre (0.97 km^{2}) public garden, with its 5,000 species of trees and shrubs adorns the Swarthmore campus, 40 acres (160,000 m^{2}) of which were landscaped by Wister himself. He grouped plant families together within the garden to establish a more practical plan. Swarthmore College awarded Wister an honorary doctor of science degree in 1942 for his work with the college, after which he was commonly referred to as “Dr. Wister.” Wister also operated a landscape architecture business out of the now-demolished Wister Mansion just off of La Salle University's campus in Philadelphia.

In 1946, Wister became the first director of the 657-acre (2.66 km^{2}) John J. Tyler Arboretum in Lima, Pennsylvania, serving in that position until 1968. He was active in many major scientific and conservation groups and was a member of about 50 horticultural societies and 30 scientific organizations. He served as secretary of the American Rose Society, president and founder of the American Iris Society, and secretary for 24 years of the Pennsylvania Horticultural Society. He served as vice-president and president of the John Bartram Association from 1930 to 1957.

He gave numerous lectures and authored or edited dozens of books and over five hundred articles on horticulture.

=== Recognition ===
Known as the Dean of American Horticulture, Wister was the first recipient of four major horticulture awards: the Liberty Hyde Bailey Medal, the Scott Garden and Horticultural Award, the A.P. Saunders Memorial Award from the American Peony Society, and the Honor and Achievement Award from the International Lilac Society. He was honored for his outstanding work with flowers at the centennial celebration of the founding of the Pennsylvania Horticultural Society. The Brooklyn Botanic Garden awarded Wister its Garden Medal for outstanding service in 1966, and in that same year, the Royal Horticultural Society dedicated its Daffodil and Tulip Yearbook to him, making Wister the first American gardener to receive this honor.

In 1927, Wister was awarded by The British Iris Society, the Foster Memorial Plaque (named after Michael Foster).

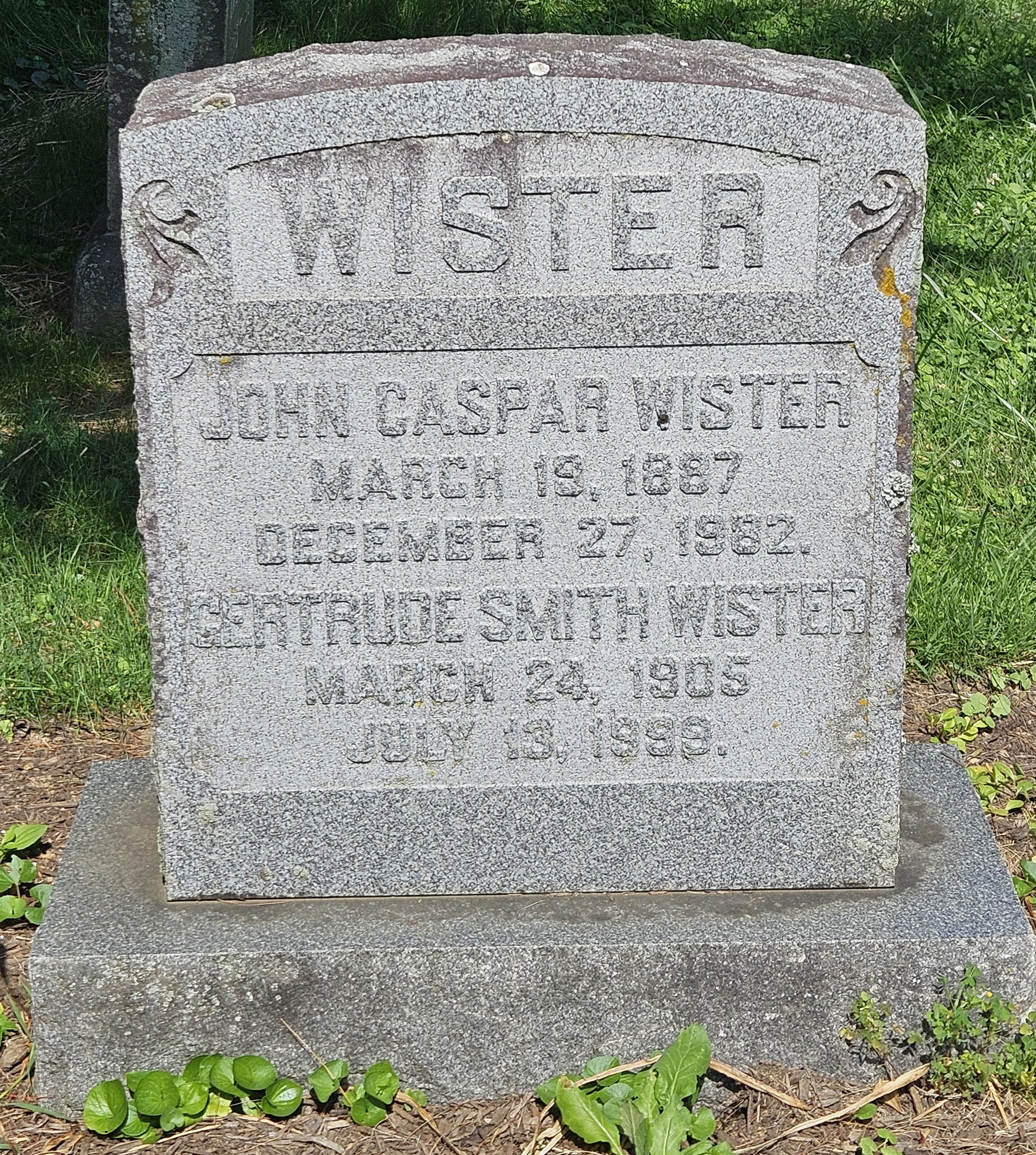
John Caspar Wister Grave

Wister died on December 27, 1982, at his home in Swarthmore, Pennsylvania. He was interred at Laurel Hill Cemetery in Philadelphia, Section M, Plot 128.

== Personal life ==
Absorbed in flowers and plants, Wister did not marry until the age of 73, when he married Gertrude Smith, a noted horticulturist. Wister referred to marriage as "the fatal plunge" in one of his wartime letters.

== Legacy ==
The Wister Medal of the American Iris Society, their highest award for a tall-bearded iris, was named in his honor. The Wister Rhododendron Garden at the John J. Tyler Arboretum is named in his honor. His papers from 1900 to 1982 are held at the Connelly Library of La Salle University.

== Publications ==
- Bulbs for American Gardens, Boston: Stratford Company, 1930
- Four Seasons In Your Garden, Philadelphia: J.B. Lippincott, 1936
- The Iris: A Treatise on the History, Development, and Culture of the Iris for the Amateur Gardener, New York: Orange Judd Publishing Company, 1927
- Lilac Culture, New York: Orange Judd Publishing Company, 1936
- Arthur Hoyt Scott Horticultural Foundation, a Ten-year History January 1, 1930, December 3, 1939., Swarthmore College, 1940
- Report of 1941 survey conducted by the Committee on Horticultural Varieties of the American Association of Botanical Gardens and Arboretums, Arthur Hoyt Scott Horticultural Foundation, Swarthmore College, 1943
- Bulbs for Home Gardens, Oxford University Press, 1948
- The Peonies, Washington, D.C.: American Horticultural Society, 1962. Written by Myron D. Bigger, et al., and edited by John C. Wister
- A Horticulturist in the A.E.F. - Letters from France from John C. Wister to Members of his Family, 1917–1919, Philadelphia: E. W. Haines, 1950
- The Woman’s Home Companion Garden Book for all Sections of the United States and Canada, New York: Doubleday, 1947

== Additional reading ==
- Belman, Laura Haines. "Remarks at La Salle University, October 1, 1994." Unpublished manuscript presented at the dedication of the Mary and Frances Wister Fine Arts Studio at La Salle University. Available in the Ethel Langhorne Wister Chichester Papers, Connelly Library, Special Collections, Folder 137.
- Haines, Ella Wister. Reminiscences of a Victorian Child. Philadelphia: E.W. Haines, 1953
- Van Atta, Burr. "John Caspar Wister, known as the dean of horticulture in U.S." The Philadelphia Inquirer, December 29, 1982. Inquirer obituary article. Available in the Ethel Langhorne Wister Chichester Papers, Connelly Library, Special Collections, Folder 157.
- Votaw, Galja Barish. "John C. Wister." Chester Times, July 16, 1951. "Personality Sketch" from the Chester Times. Newspaper clipping found on front inside cover of A Horticulturist in the A.E.F: Letters from France from John C. Wister to Members of his Family, 1917–1919.
