= Edward Lewis Sturtevant =

American agronomist and botanist

E. Lewis Sturtevant
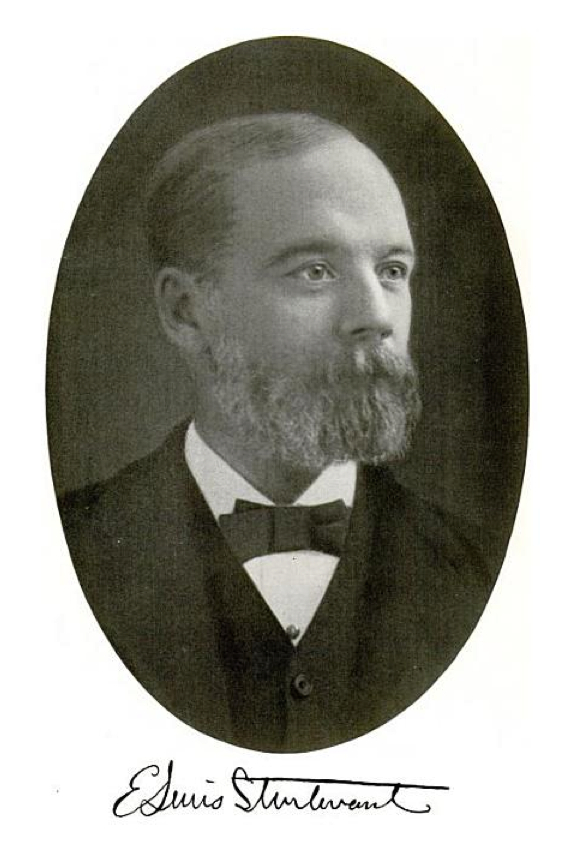
- Born: January 23, 1842; Boston, Massachusetts
- Died: July 30, 1898 (aged 56); South Framingham, Massachusetts
- Spouses: Mary Elizabeth (Mann) Sturtevant; Hattie (Mann) Sturtevant
- Children: Grace, Robert, 3 others
- Scientific career
- Fields: agronomy, botany
- Author abbrev. (botany): Sturtev.

Edward Lewis Sturtevant (January 23, 1842 – July 30, 1898) was an American agronomist and botanist who wrote Sturtevant's Edible Plants of the World. An enormously prolific author, he was considered one of the giants of American agricultural science in his own time.

== Early life and education ==
E. Lewis Sturtevant was born in Boston, Massachusetts, on January 23, 1842, to Lewis W. Sturtevant (descendant of a family of Puritan ancestry) and Mary Haight (Legett) Sturtevant. Through a common ancestor, Samuel Sturtevant, who emigrated from England to America in the 1640s, he is a distant cousin of the geneticist Alfred Henry Sturtevant. While still a youth, his parents died, and Lewis was raised by an aunt. In 1859 he entered Bowdoin College but left before completing his degree to join the Union Army when the American Civil War broke out in 1861. He served in the 74th Regiment of Maine Volunteers as a captain but was invalided out due to a combined attack of typhoid and malaria in 1863. He afterwards received both a B.A. and an M.A. from Bowdoin, where he had developed good fluency in Greek, Latin, French, and German. He went on to Harvard Medical School, from which he graduated in 1866, though he never actually followed the profession of medicine.

In 1864 he married Mary Elizabeth Mann, with whom he had four children, Harriett (also known as Hattie), Edward, Thomas, and Grace, who went on to become a noted iris breeder. Both Grace and her mother had artistic talent and illustrated some of Lewis's scientific papers on corn (Mary Elizabeth) and peppers and sweet potatoes (Grace). Mary Elizabeth died in 1875 and Lewis married again, to her sister Hattie. The son from this second marriage, Robert Sturtevant, was a landscape architect who was close to his half-sister Grace and worked with her on plant breeding.

== Career as botanist and agronomist ==
In 1867, with his brothers Thomas and Joseph, Sturtevant founded "Waushakum Farm" in South Framingham, Massachusetts. The farm was used for various agricultural experiments; one of the first enterprises of the Sturtevant brothers was the development of a model dairy farm featuring Ayrshire cattle. The monograph they published on this work in 1875 led to the establishment of a regular publication, the North American Ayrshire Register, a work that was still being consulted by Ayrshire breeders at least a generation after Lewis's death.

Sturtevant was particularly interested in food crops. Among the crops he studied and published on are beans, peppers, sweet potatoes, and corn. He developed several new strains including a very productive variety of yellow flint corn that he named 'Waushakum'. One of his publications, Varieties of Corn (Bulletin 57 from the United States Department of Agriculture) was considered a landmark study of the botany and culture of corn.

During the course of his researches, Sturtevant amassed one of the most comprehensive American agricultural and botanical libraries of the day, one centered around some 500 pre-Linnean texts that were then comparatively rare in America. This library was later given to the Missouri Botanical Garden, which published a catalog of the library in 1896.

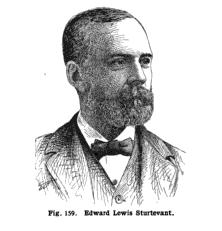
E. Lewis Sturtevant

Over some thirty years, Sturtevant wrote hundreds of articles for various agricultural publications (both scientific and popular), often using the pen name of Zelco. For three years in the 1870s he was either co-editor (with E.H. Libby) or sole editor of Scientific Farmer. He was in demand as a speaker on the agricultural circuit, and he was active in various scientific associations, as a fellow of the American Association for the Advancement of Science, as a member of the Massachusetts Horticultural Society, and as the first secretary and fourth president (elected 1887) of the Society for the Promotion of Agricultural Science.

Sturtevant is credited with building the first lysimeter in America. It was put to use on Waushakum Farm in 1875, and records of water percolation on the farm were kept for more than four years.

In 1879 Lewis's brother Joseph died, breaking up the close collaboration among the trio of Sturtevant brothers that had lasted for more than a decade. In 1882 Lewis was appointed the first director of the New York State Agricultural Experiment Station in Geneva, New York. Although state farmers had wanted the station to serve primarily as a model farm, Sturtevant immediately established the policy that the station was to conduct agricultural science research and to establish experimental plots, both of which would have little resemblance to commercial agriculture. He left this position after five years and returned to Waushakum Farm.

At Waushakum Farm, Sturtevant began serious work on a long-meditated study of the history of food plants. He amassed voluminous notes on over 1,000 genera and 3,000 species of edible plants of the world. (At the same time, he started writing a general encyclopedia of agriculture and allied subjects; this had reached the letter M by the time of his death.) Sturtevant did not complete his study of food plants before he died, leaving behind some 1600 manuscript pages. What became his posthumously edited and published Notes on Edible Plants (1919) was assembled from this manuscript together with material taken from reports issued by the New York State Agricultural Experiment Station during his tenure, a series of articles in American Naturalist on garden vegetables, and more than 40,000 index cards of notes. Among material that had to be omitted was his writings on edible fungi, which had become seriously outdated by the time the book was released. Notes on Edible Plants was reissued in 1972 as Sturtevant's Edible Plants of the World.

Sturtevant fell ill of the flu in 1893 and never fully regained his health. He contracted tuberculosis and died July 30, 1898, at Waushakum Farm.

== Literature ==
- edward lewis Sturtevant, joseph n. Sturtevant. 1875. The Dairy Cow: A Monograph on the Ayrshire Breed of Cattle. Ed. A. Williams & Co. 252 pp. Reprint BiblioLife, 2010. 274 pp. ISBN 1-175-50254-5
- 1899. Varieties of corn. Bulletin Nº 57. Ed. Government Printing Office. 108 pp.
- 1919. Sturtevant's Edible Plants of the World. Ed. J. B. Lyon Co. 696 pp. Reprint General Books LLC, 2010. 620 pp. ISBN 1-154-86164-3
