= USS Sturtevant (DE-239) =

Warship - destroyer escort of the United States Navy

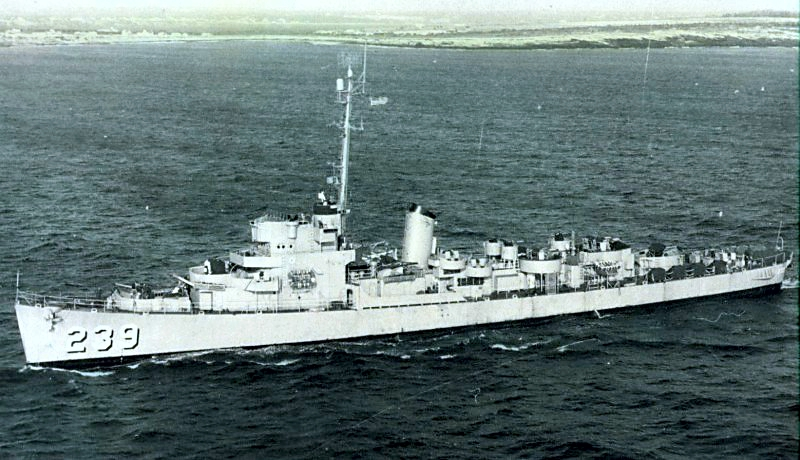

History

United States
- Namesake: Albert D. Sturtevant
- Builder: Brown Shipbuilding Houston, Texas
- Laid down: 15 July 1942
- Launched: 3 December 1942
- Commissioned: 16 June 1943
- Decommissioned: June 1960
- Reclassified: DER-239, 1 November 1956
- Stricken: 1 December 1972
- Fate: Sold for scrapping, 20 September 1973

General characteristics
- Class & type: Edsall-class destroyer escort
- Displacement: 1,253 tons standard; 1,590 tons full load
- Length: 306 feet (93.27 m)
- Beam: 36.58 feet (11.15 m)
- Draft: 10.42 full load feet (3.18 m)
- Propulsion: 4 FM diesel engines, 4 diesel-generators, 6,000 shp (4.5 MW), 2 screws
- Speed: 21 knots (39 km/h)
- Range: 9,100 nmi. at 12 knots; (17,000 km at 22 km/h)
- Complement: 8 officers, 201 enlisted
- Armament: 3 × single 3 in (76 mm)/50 guns; 1 × twin 40 mm AA guns; 8 × single 20 mm AA guns; 1 × triple 21 in (533 mm) torpedo tubes; 8 × depth charge projectors; 1 × depth charge projector (hedgehog); 2 × depth charge tracks

USS Sturtevant (DE-239) was an Edsall class destroyer escort in service with the United States Navy from 1943 to 1946 and from 1951 to 1960. She was scrapped in 1973.

== History ==
She was named in honor of Albert D. Sturtevant who was awarded the Navy Cross posthumously during World War I when he, a pilot, was shot down by German fighter planes. Sturtevant was laid down on 15 July 1942 by the Brown Shipbuilding Co., at Houston, Texas; launched on 3 December 1942; sponsored by Mrs. William North Sturtevant; and commissioned on 16 June 1943.

=== World War II North Atlantic operations ===
After shakedown in the vicinity of Bermuda and training off the Rhode Island coast, Sturtevant began 21 months of convoy escort duty in the Atlantic. On 24 September, she got underway to screen her first convoy to Casablanca and Gibraltar. After two more such Atlantic crossings, she was assigned to Liverpool-bound convoys and made five voyages to Derry in Northern Ireland, the principal escort base in the UK and home to US NOB Londonderry. Sturtevant rounded out her Atlantic service with two convoys each to Liverpool, England, and Cardiff, Wales, and one to Southampton, England. Between crossings, the destroyer escort was repaired and overhauled at the New York Navy Yard and trained at Casco Bay, Maine, and at Montauk Point, Long Island. In all, Sturtevant made 13 successful round-trip voyages across the Atlantic and back.

=== Pacific War ===
On 9 June 1945, she entered the New York Navy Yard for post-voyage availability. Sturtevant emerged from the yard 38 days later with her antiaircraft defenses strengthened considerably. En route to Pearl Harbor, she trained for 14 days in the Guantánamo Bay area and stopped briefly at San Diego, California. By the time Sturtevant arrived in San Diego, the war was already over and the city had already quit celebrating. Capt. Mertz, knowing that the ship could be ordered to stay in San Diego, shipped out to Hawaii before all the ship repairs, e.g. the air conditioning, were completed.

=== Post-war operations ===
No longer needed in the Pacific Ocean, the destroyer escort was ordered back to the Atlantic Fleet, carrying passengers to San Pedro, Los Angeles, on the first leg and reaching Charleston, South Carolina, on 25 September. There she started preparations for decommissioning and inactivation with the Atlantic Reserve Fleet. In October, she shifted to the inactive fleet berthing area at Green Cove Springs, Florida, where she was decommissioned on 24 March 1946.

=== Reactivation in 1951 ===
After six years of inactivity in Florida, Sturtevant was recommissioned on 3 August 1951. For the next four years, she operated along the Atlantic coast of the United States and in the Caribbean Sea. Her operations carried her as far north as the coast of Labrador and as far south as Cuba. Much of the time she spent in the Caribbean was devoted to work in conjunction with the Fleet Sonar School at Key West, Florida, and with the hunter-killer Forces of the Atlantic Fleet.

After visiting ports in northern Europe during a midshipman cruise conducted in the summer of 1955, she resumed her training duties with the Fleet Sonar School and normal operations for another year. She joined another midshipman cruise, in July and August 1956; this time to Panama and the Guantanamo Bay Naval Base in Cuba.

=== Conversion to radar picket ship ===
On 31 October 1956, Sturtevant entered the Philadelphia Naval Shipyard for conversion to a radar picket destroyer escort ship. The conversion process lasted until 5 October 1957, when she was recommissioned as DER-239. On 7 February 1958, she departed Philadelphia, Pennsylvania, for the Pacific Ocean, calling at Newport, Rhode Island; San Juan, Puerto Rico; Rodman in the Panama Canal Zone; Acapulco, Mexico; and San Diego, California, before arriving in Pearl Harbor on 18 March. Upon completion of further training in Hawaii, she became one of the original ships of the Pacific Early Warning Barrier.

=== Final decommissioning and fate ===
She continued to so serve in the Pacific Fleet until June 1960, when she was placed out of commission and berthed with the San Diego, California, Group of the Pacific Reserve Fleet. There she remained until the fall of 1972 when an inspection and survey board found her to be unfit for further naval service. Her name was struck from the Navy list on 1 December 1972; and, on 20 September 1973, her hulk was sold to the National Metal and Steel Corporation, Terminal Island, California, for scrapping.
