= Martha Tracy =

American physician and educator (1876–1942)

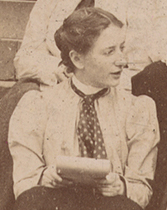
- Martha Tracy as a student, 1903
- Born: April 10, 1876; Plainfield, New Jersey
- Died: March 22, 1942 (aged 65); Philadelphia, Pennsylvania
- Education: Bryn Mawr College, Woman's Medical College of Pennsylvania, University of Pennsylvania
- Scientific career
- Fields: Physiological chemistry and Hygiene
- Workplaces: Woman's Medical College of Pennsylvania (WMC)

Martha Tracy (April 10, 1876 – March 22, 1942) served as dean of the Woman's Medical College of Pennsylvania (WMCP) from 1917 to 1940, leading the institution through the Great Depression. She created a department of preventive medicine within the college and was the first professor of preventive medicine at WMC.

Beginning in the mid-1920s, Tracy rallied support to build a new hospital and college, raising $1.5 million over five years and opening a new building in East Falls, Philadelphia in 1930. In 1940, she joined the City of Philadelphia as assistant director of Health.

== Early life and education ==
Martha Tracy was the youngest of nine children of first cousins Martha Sherman (Greene) Tracy and Jeremiah Evarts Tracy. She was the cousin of Woman's Medical College of Pennsylvania alumna Dr. Elizabeth Follansbee, the niece of Senator William Maxwell Evarts, the granddaughter of Jeremiah Evarts and the great-great-granddaughter of founding father Roger Sherman. Tracy attended Plainfield Seminary for Young Ladies and Children. She studied at Bryn Mawr College from 1894 to 1898, where she was captain of the basketball team for three years and president of the College Athletic Association for one year, while earning her Bachelor of Arts degree. She attended the Woman's Medical College of Pennsylvania, taking classes with chemistry professor Henry Leffmann among others. She graduated in 1904 as a medical doctor.

In 1904, Tracy went to Cornell Medical College in New York as a graduate student, doing laboratory research. There she developed a method of preparing Coley's Fluid for Dr. William Coley, who advocated the use of dead bacteria as a possible treatment for cancer. Tracy grew two bacteria separately, Streptococcus pyogenes in sterilized beef broth in an incubator and Serratia marcescens on sterilized agar solution exposed to indirect sunlight. They were prepared, mixed together, and sterilized. Tracy was able to measure the concentration of Serratia in the resulting fluid using nitrogen determination.

== Academic career ==
In 1907, Tracy became an associate professor of chemistry at the Woman's Medical College of Pennsylvania, working under Dr. Henry Leffman. She also continued to do laboratory research independently with support from the Huntingdon Fund for Cancer Research. In 1908, she became the first woman member of the American Association for Cancer Research (AACR), which had been founded a year earlier.

From 1911 to 1913 Tracy spent a year on leave of absence from WMC, studying Physiological Chemistry at Yale University. She returned to Woman's Medical College of Pennsylvania in 1913 to rank as a full professor of physiological chemistry in the department of Physiological Chemistry.

While teaching, Tracy studied Public Health and Preventive Medicine at the University of Pennsylvania. In 1917, she was awarded a doctorate in public hygiene by the University of Pennsylvania.

== Deanship ==
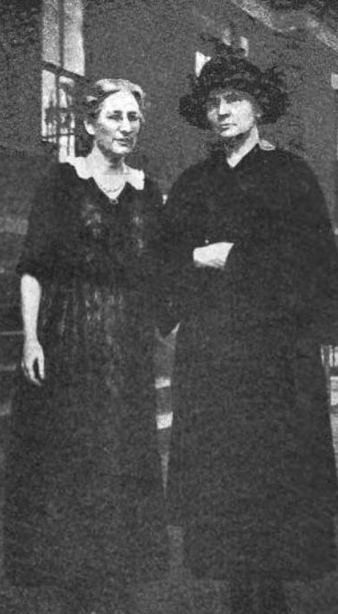
Martha Tracy and Marie Curie, from a 1921 publication

In 1917, Martha Tracy was selected as the seventh dean of the Woman's Medical College of Pennsylvania, succeeding Clara Marshall. She served in this position until 1940. In addition to the deanship, she took over professor Leffmann's course in hygiene in 1917, which she taught until 1931. During her time as dean, Tracy expanded the department's offerings in social medicine, envisioning a program that would address the broad range of topics "which especially claim the attention of women physicians."

Tracy rallied support to build a new hospital and college, raising $1.5 million from 1925 to 1930, and opening a new building in East Falls, Philadelphia in 1930. Sarah Logan Wister Starr, a Philadelphia socialite and philanthropist, was active in raising funds for the new building.

In 1931, Tracy recruited Sarah I. Morris to teach preventive medicine. Tracy created a four-year curriculum in preventive medicine that included field trips to factories, sewage plants, and water works. Students had to write a senior thesis in the area of prevention. Tracy was not afraid to support controversial issues as thesis topics, such as a student's choice of "medical services in the Soviet Union," during a period when there was much suspicion in the United States about communism.

In 1932, with support from the National American Woman Suffrage Association, Tracy established a health clinic offering services to "women of moderate means," now known as the Anna Howard Shaw Health Service for Women.

In response to the Great Depression, former graduates, faculty, and trustees of the medical college carried out a successful emergency fundraising campaign. Although the college briefly lost its "acceptable" rating from the American Medical Association in 1935, it regained it by 1937.

== Assistant Director of Health ==
From 1936 to 1940, in addition to her positions at WMC, Tracy served on the Philadelphia Board of Health. In 1940, nearing mandatory retirement age at WMC, she was appointed by the City of Philadelphia as assistant director of Health.

After the Japanese attack on Pearl Harbor in December 1941, Tracy began to organize Civilian Defense Squads throughout the city as the United States prepared for war. On the way home from an evening meeting, she became chilled. She died of pneumonia on March 22, 1942, in the hospital of the Women's Medical College. Burial took place at Hillside Cemetery in Plainfield, New Jersey.

== Honors ==
- In 1908 Martha Tracy was selected as the first female member of the American Association for Cancer Research.
- She was elected president of the American Medical Women's Association, serving one term from 1920 to 1921.
- In 1923, she became a Fellow of the American College of Physicians.
- In 1934, she was the second woman physician to become a Fellow of the College of Physicians of Philadelphia.
