= Follansbee (surname) =

Follansbee is a surname. Notable people with the surname include:

- Clyde Follansbee (1902–1948), American politician
- Edward Follansbee Noyes (1832–1890), American politician
- Elizabeth Follansbee (1839–1917), American physician and professor
