= Rose Talbot Bullard =

American physician

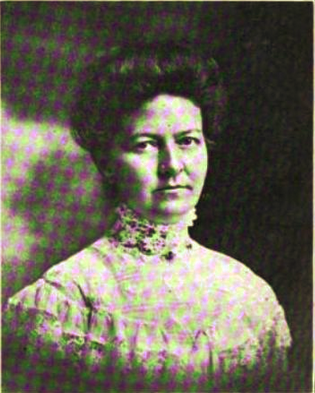
Rose Talbot Bullard, M.D., from a 1909 publication

Rose Talbot Bullard (April 16, 1864 – December 22, 1915) was an American physician and medical school professor, who was elected president of the Los Angeles County Medical Association in 1902.

== Early life ==
Rose Talbot (the surname is sometimes seen as "Talbott") was born in Birmingham, Iowa in 1864. Her father was a physician. She earned her medical degree at the Women's Hospital Medical College in Chicago, where she graduated at the top of her class in 1886. Her sister Lula Talbot Ellis was also a physician, and the first woman to graduate from the medical school at the University of Southern California in 1888.

== Career ==
Bullard moved to California in 1886 and soon was helping with a smallpox epidemic in Los Angeles. She shared a practice with Elizabeth Follansbee. She taught gynecology at the University of Southern California. She was one of the first officers of the YWCA of Los Angeles, when it formed in 1893. She was elected president of the Los Angeles County Medical Association in 1902, the first woman to serve in that post (and the only woman to serve in that post until 1992). She was also a fellow of the American College of Surgeons, one of only eight women elected to that status when the organization was founded in 1912. In her obstetric practice, she was among the first in Southern California to use spinal anesthesia. When the American Medical Association established a Public Health Education Committee in 1909, Bullard was one of the ten physicians appointed to the committee, and the only one from Los Angeles.

In her work with women patients, she advocated outdoor activity, especially bicycling, which she believed came with other benefits for women. "The bicycle has done more for the cause of legitimate dress reform than any other single agent," she declared in 1895.

"Men may talk and argue about women physicians, as such," commented a medical journal editorial in 1903, "but no person ever comments unfavorably upon Dr. Bullard, either as a physician or a lady."

== Personal life and legacy ==
Bullard married a fellow physician, ophthalmologist and anesthesiologist Frank Dearborn Bullard, in 1888. Bullard died suddenly in 1915, aged 51 years, from complications after a surgery to treat a dental infection.

The Women Physicians Action Committee of the Los Angeles County Medical Association gives an annual Rose Talbot Bullard Award for a woman physician who is a "champion and trailblazer".
