= Consuelo H. Wilkins =

American physician

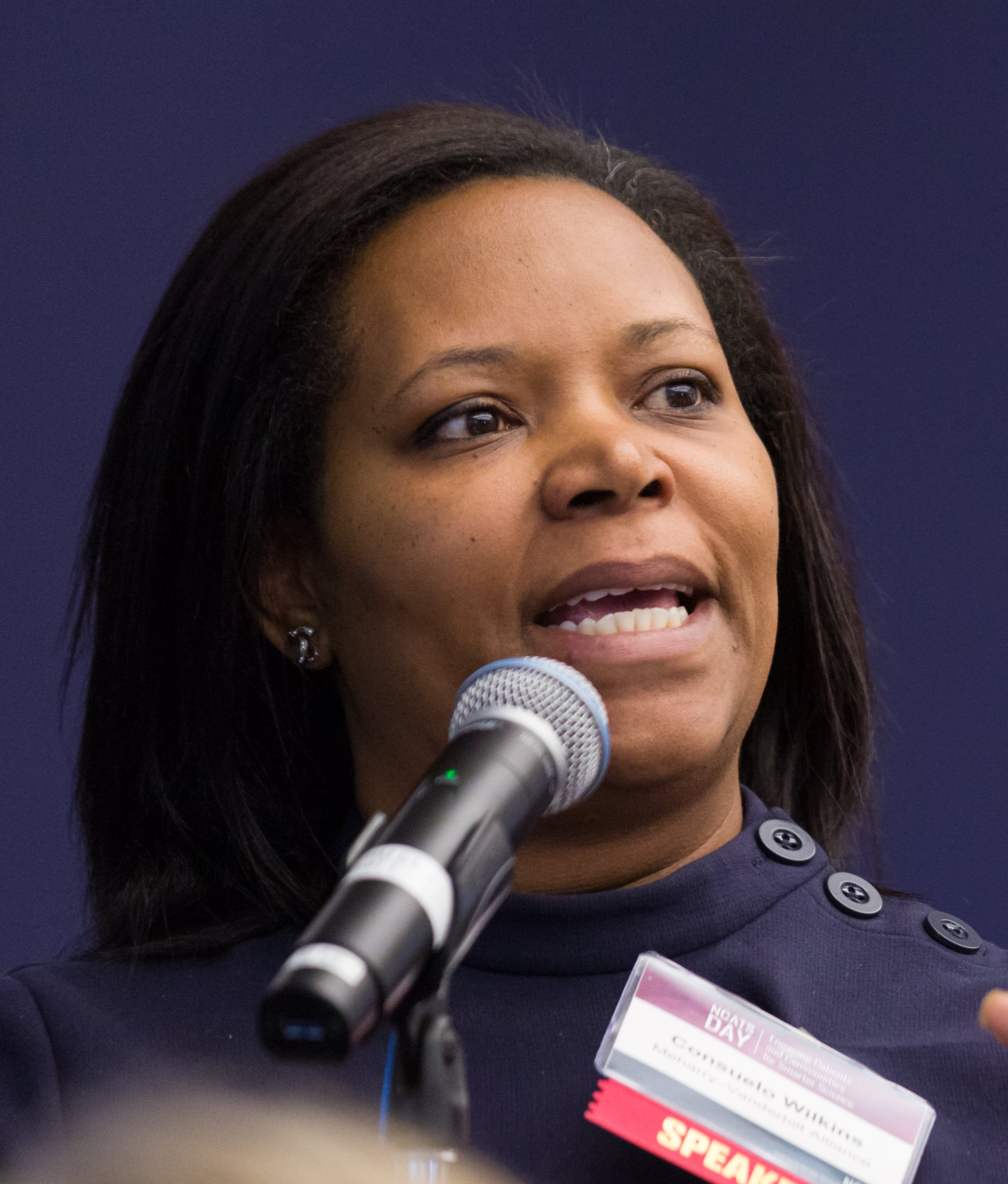
Consuelo H. Wilkins in 2018

Consuelo H. Wilkins is an American physician, biomedical researcher, and health equity expert. She is Senior Vice President and Senior Associate Dean for Health Equity and Inclusive Excellence at Vanderbilt University Medical Center. She is a professor of medicine in the Department of Medicine, Division of Geriatrics at Vanderbilt University School of Medicine and has a joint appointment at Meharry Medical College. She additionally serves as one of the principal investigators of the Vanderbilt Clinical and Translational Science Award, Director of the Meharry-Vanderbilt Community Engaged Research Core (CTSA) and as vice president for Health Equity at Vanderbilt University Medical Center.

== Education ==
Wilkins attended Howard University and Washington University in St. Louis. She received a bachelor's degree in microbiology from Howard University, an M.D. from Howard University College of Medicine (1996) and a Master of Science in Clinical Investigation from Washington University School of Medicine (2002).

== Career ==
Wilkins was an associate professor of medicine, psychiatry and surgery at Washington University until 2012 when she was named executive director of the Meharry-Vanderbilt Alliance in Nashville, TN. She was also director of the Institute for Public Health's Center for Community Health and Partnerships at Washington University and co-director of the Center for Community Engaged Research in the Institute of Clinical and Translational Science.

After joining the Meharry-Vanderbilt Alliance, she became co-chair of the Community Partners Integration Workgroup of the CTSA Consortium's Community Engagement Key Function Committee in 2012.

In 2013, Wilkins received a Patient-Centered Outcomes Research Institute Research Award for her proposal "Improving Patient Engagement and Understanding Its Impact on Research Through Community Review Boards." In 2014, she became a member of the PCORnet Patient & Consumer Engagement (PCE) Task Force and the PCORI Advisory Panel on Clinical Trials (CTAP), Subcommittee on Recruitment, Accrual and Retention (RAR).

In 2018, Wilkins was quoted in the Smithsonian Magazine article "The DNA Data We Have Is Too White. Scientists Want to Fix That," where she discussed the challenges of gaining minorities' trust. In 2019, she was named vice president for Health Equity at Vanderbilt University Medical Center and Associate Dean for Health Equity with the Vanderbilt University School of Medicine.

In 2020, she ended her tenure as executive director of the MVA and passed the leadership role onto Karen Winkfield.

== Awards and honors ==
Wilkins is a member of the Association of American Medical Colleges as part of the Research on Care Community (ROCC) and has been designated a ROCC Star. She is also ranked among the Fifty Most Innovative People in Healthcare by Healthcare Administration Degree Programs.

In 2008, she received the Kopolow Award for Excellence in Geriatrics, Neurology or Psychiatry and the Distinguished Community Service Award from Washington University.

In 2013, she was named a Norman R. Seay Lecturer for the Knight's Alzheimer's Disease Research Center, and she received the Association of American Medical Colleges Learning Health System Challenge Award.

She is a graduate of the 2014-15 class of the Hedwig van Ameringen Executive Leadership in Academic Medicine (ELAM) Program for Women.

In 2020, Wilkins became an elected member of the National Academy of Medicine. She is recipient of the 2021 Marion Spencer Fay Award, Institute for Women's Health & Leadership, Drexel University College of Medicine and recipient of a Nashville Business Journal 2021 Health Care Innovation Award. In 2022, Wilkins became an elected member of the American Society for Clinical Investigation.
