= Gurubai Karmarkar =

Indian physician

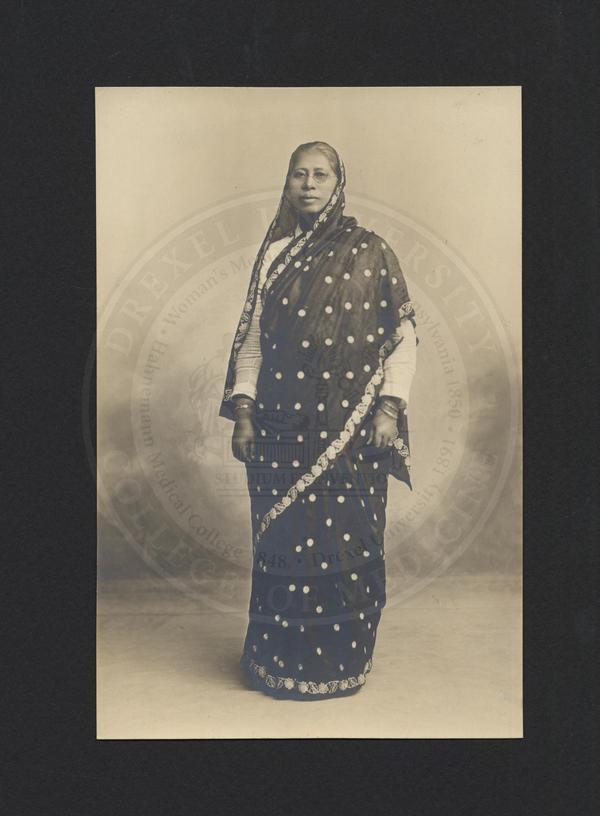
- Died: 1931
- Occupation: medical doctor

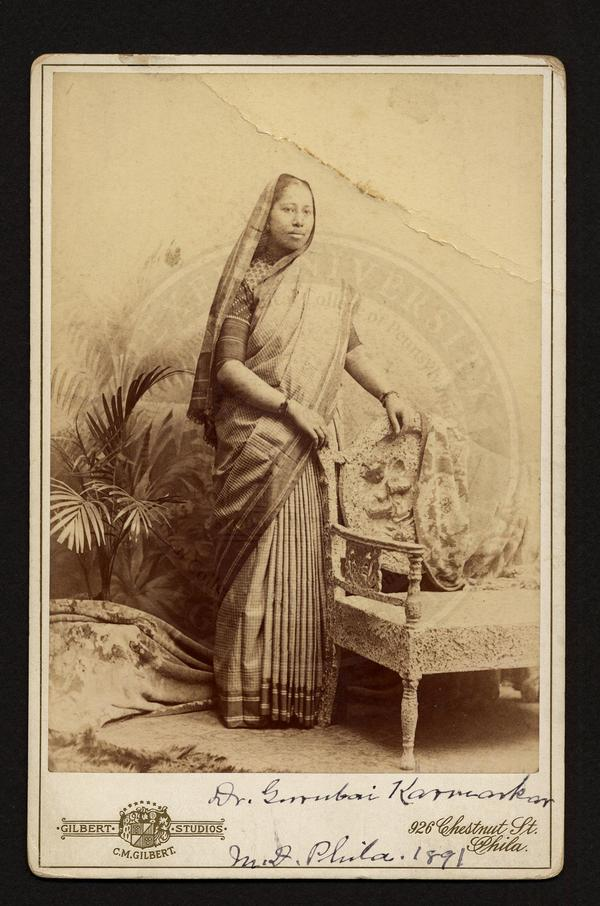
Gurubai Karmarkar as a graduate of Women's Medical College of Pennsylvania (1892)

Gurubai Karmarkar (died 1932) was the second Indian woman to graduate from the Woman's Medical College of Pennsylvania in 1892.

== Medical career ==
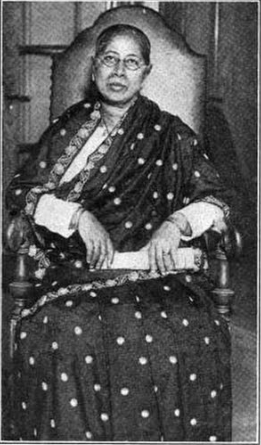
Dr. Gurubal Karmarkar (1918)

Gurubai Karmarkar returned to India in 1893 after receiving her medical degree. She worked for the 23 years at the American Marathi Mission, a Christian establishment, in Bombay, India. Her medical work focused mainly on the most disenfranchised members of the Indian caste system. A prominent group in her practice were women of all castes. In one letter to the Woman's board of missions, Dr. Karmarkar tells the stories of two "young child-wives" she treated over the past year. Both young woman suffered abuse from their husbands and in-laws. The first young wife had been branded on her foot to stop her from running away. The second wife was malnourished and was suffering from a severe fever. Dr. Karmarkar uses these two stories as a way to illustrate the plight of Indian women to her counterparts in the United States.

Karmarkar was a member of the National Board of the YWCA in India.
