= Belfield (Philadelphia) =

Historic house in Pennsylvania, United States

- Charles Willson Peale House
- U.S. National Register of Historic Places
- U.S. National Historic Landmark
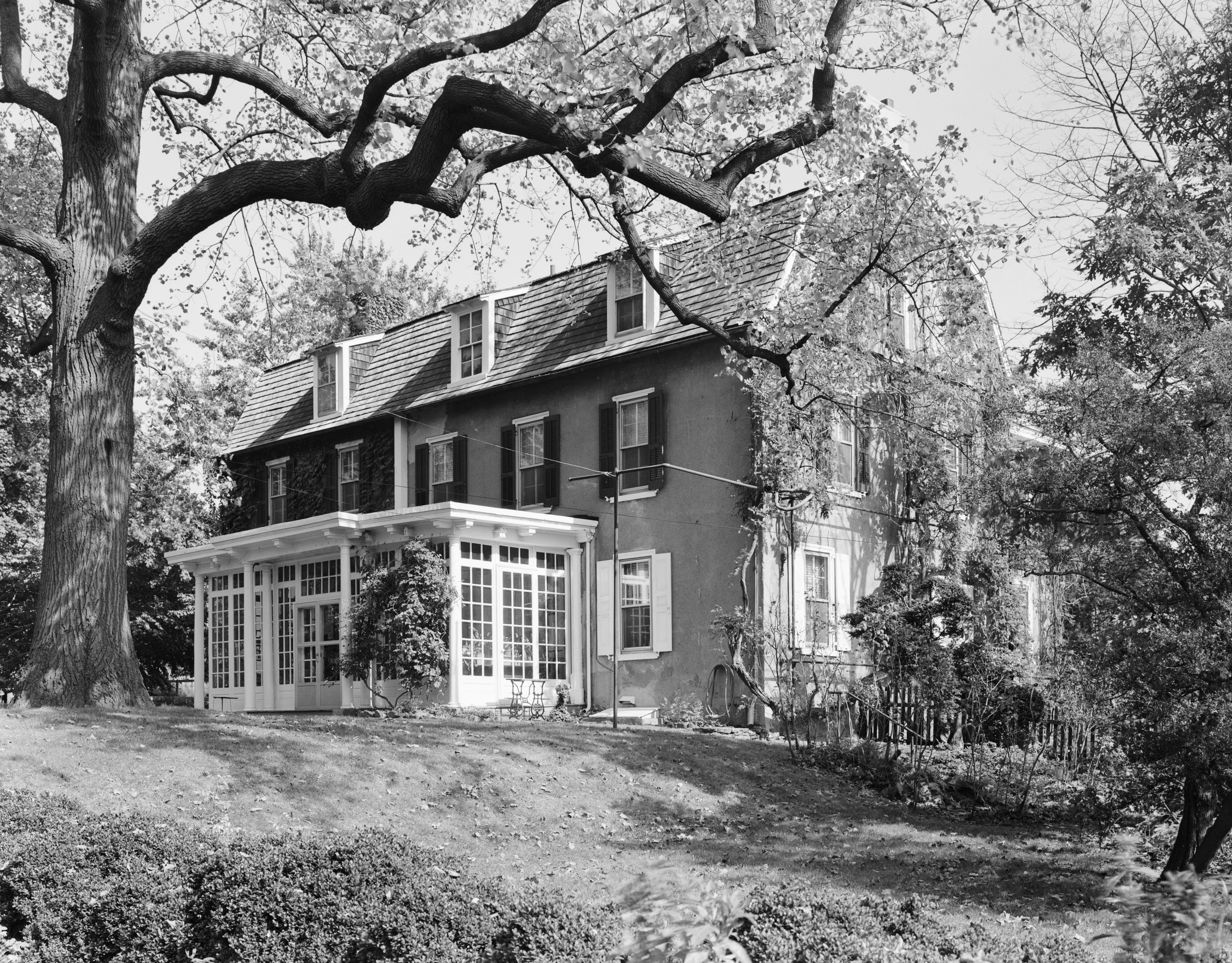
- Charles Willson Peale House

- Location within Philadelphia Location within Pennsylvania Location within the United States
- Location: 2100 West Clarkson Avenue, Philadelphia, Pennsylvania, U.S.
- Coordinates: 40°2′16.6″N 75°9′19.53″W
- Built: 1755
- Architectural style: Dutch Colonial
- NRHP reference No.: 66000687

Significant dates
- Added to NRHP: October 15, 1966
- Designated NHL: December 21, 1965

Belfield, also known as the Charles Willson Peale House, was the home of Charles Willson Peale from 1810 to 1826, and was declared a National Historic Landmark in 1965. The Belfield Estate was a 104-acre (42 ha) area of land in the Logan section of Philadelphia, Pennsylvania, United States, much of which is now a part of La Salle University’s campus.

== Early history ==
In 1684, William Penn granted to Thomas Bowman 588 acres (238 ha) near Germantown. Bowman kept the land for two years, and sold it to Samuel Richardson, a Quaker who was active in the early colonial government of Pennsylvania. The property extended from Old York Road to the edges of Germantown, with Richardson's home, "Newington", located on Old York Road.

Upon Samuel Richardson's death in 1719, his son Joseph inherited the land, and split it among his children, with the area that would become Belfield going to his second son, John. John Richardson sold a portion of the land to John Eckstein in 1731. The 1731 deed mentions "Buildings & Woods & Underwoods, Timbers, Trees, Meadows, Marshes." This is the first time that "buildings" are recorded on the property. The once free-standing, square structure now attached to the rear of the main house is believed to be the oldest surviving building, but it is not known whether this building existed at the time of the sale to Eckstein.

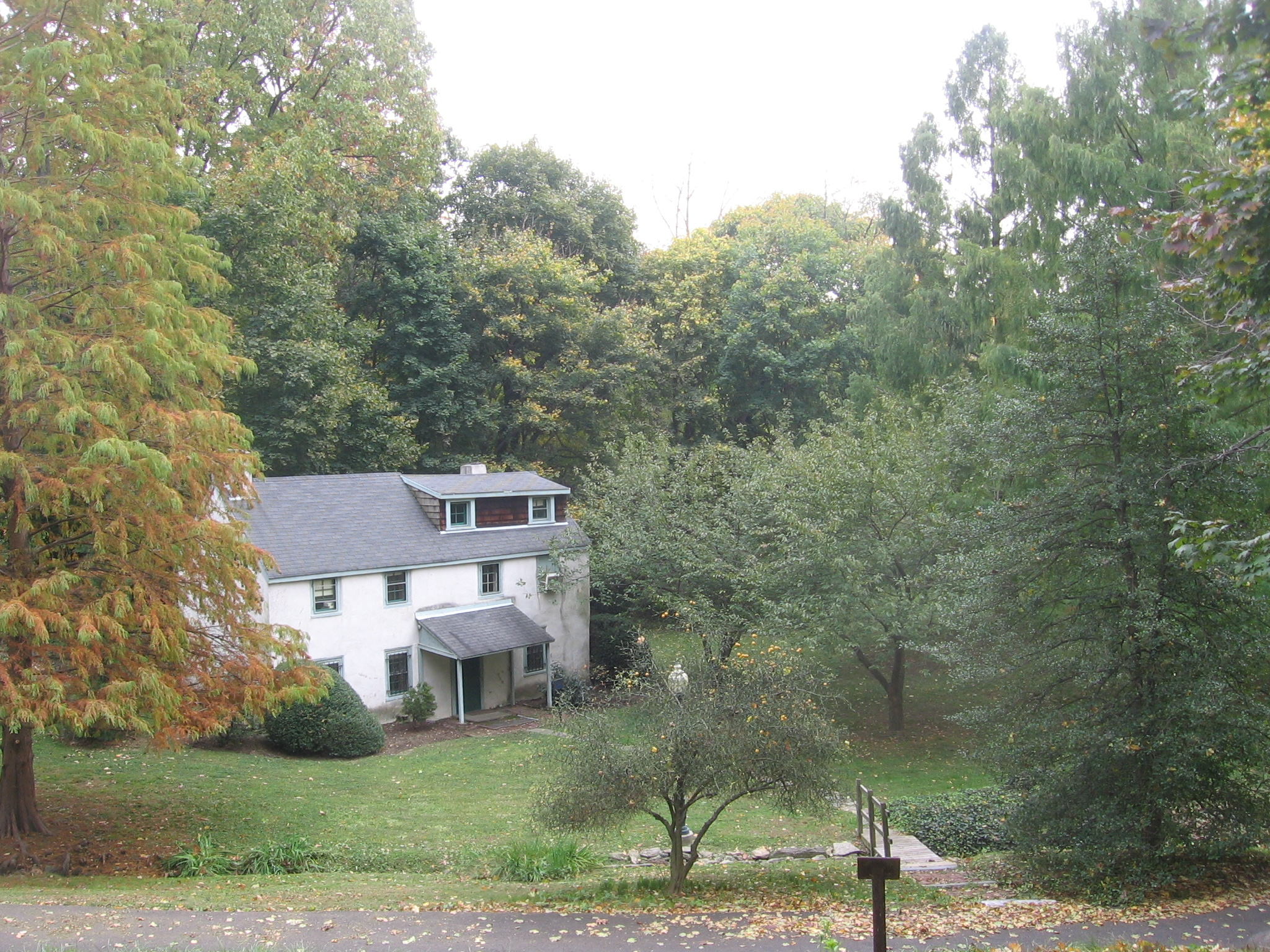
The Tenant House, also known as the "Japanese Tea Ceremony House"

Eckstein transferred the land that the main house is located on to his daughter Magdalena and son-in-law Conrad Weber in 1755, and after the death of Eckstein in 1763 the land was split among his remaining children. Two of the remaining children of Eckstein became members of the religious Ephrata Cloister in Lancaster County, and all had sold their land to Weber by 1786. Though the exact date of construction of the main house at Belfield is not known, Peale later wrote that it was built "by a Dutchman". As Weber was the son of a Dutch immigrant, this would date the house to sometime after 1755.

Weber sold the property to his tenant Richard Neave in 1804, not having lived on the property himself since the 1770s. Neave owned the property until his death in 1809, when it was sold to his tenants, Charles and Mary Grégoire. The Grégoires possessed the property for just three months before putting it up for sale.

== Charles Willson Peale ==
Seeking to retire, Charles Willson Peale turned over the administration of his Philadelphia Museum to his son, Rubens, and began to look for a small country estate. He purchased the land in 1810 from Charles Grégoire for $9500. Peale initially named the estate 'Farm Persevere', and wrote to Thomas Jefferson, telling him "by labor and perseverance I obtained it." Friends of Peale's thought that this name was far too solemn, and as a result, by 1812 he had changed it to 'Bellefield', which later, became 'Belfield.'

Peale began renovations on the mansion house after purchasing the property, separating partitions in between rooms, and adding a "painting room to the north side of the house. When this room was destroyed in a storm in August 1817, a larger, two-story addition was added.

In October 1821, Peale and his wife Hannah contracted yellow fever, which led to Hannah's death. A weakened Peale moved in with his son Rubens, and put Belfield up for sale. In January 1826, William Logan Fisher, whose estate of Wakefield bordered Belfield to the southeast, purchased the property for $11,000.

=== Gardens and Grounds ===
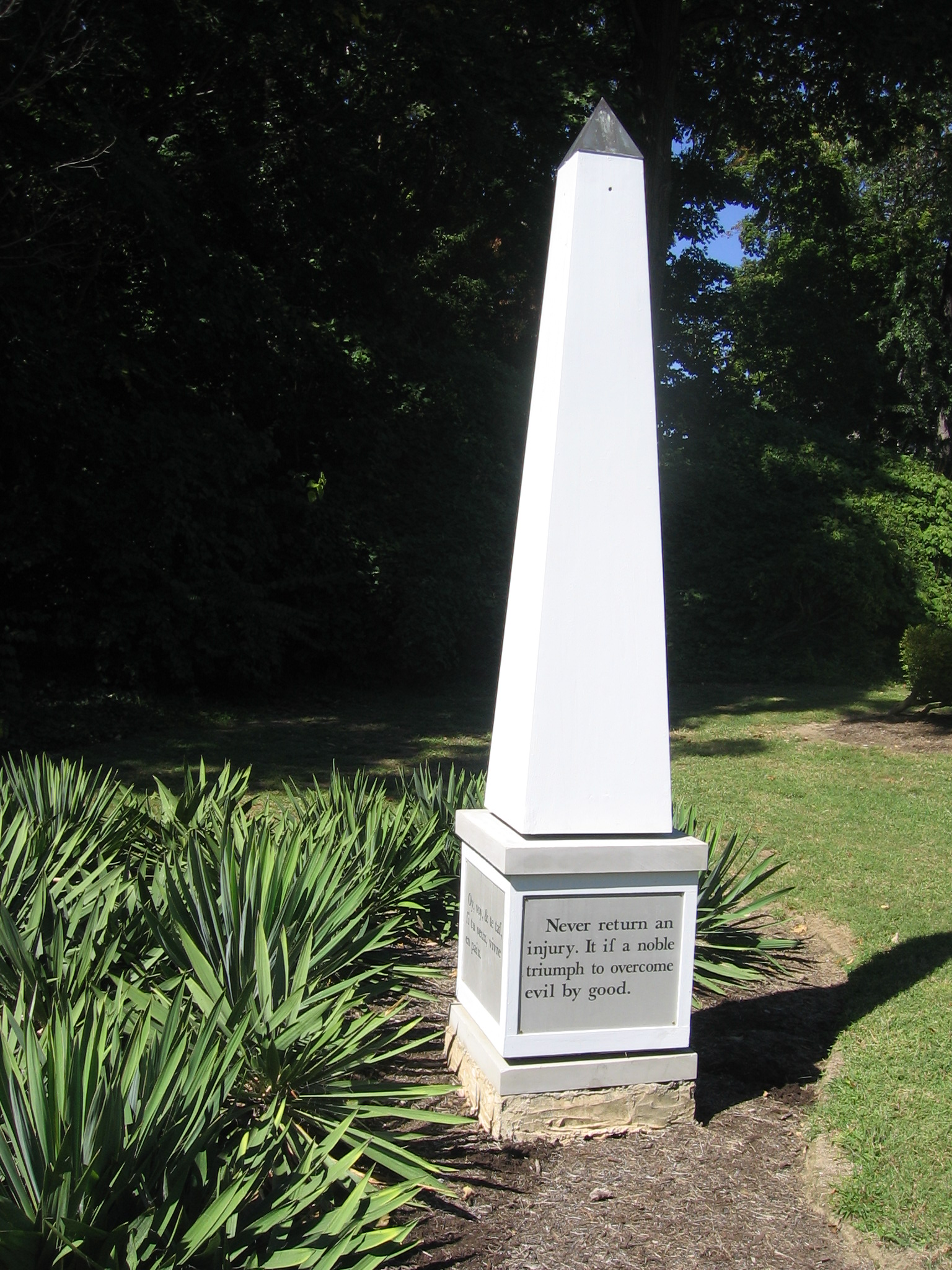
A reproduction of Charles Willson Peale's obelisk

Peale cultivated, and frequently used as inspiration, extensive gardens on the estate grounds. One of the first structures Peale added to his garden was a "summer house", built in about 1813 by his son Franklin. It was a hexagonal structure with six columns, and a bust of George Washington crowning its roof.

The Wister family later built a gazebo on this site that as of 2014 is in a ruined state. Northwest of the summer house was an obelisk at the end of a garden walk. Peale painted four mottos that governed his life on the base of this obelisk, one on each side. It was Peale's wish to have been buried at the foot of this obelisk, yet it was not to be, as Peale sold Belfield a year before his death. Though Peale was not buried at this location, the Wister family later buried their dog, a white German Spitz named 'Kaiser', there. A reproduction of this obelisk was created by La Salle alumni in 2000.

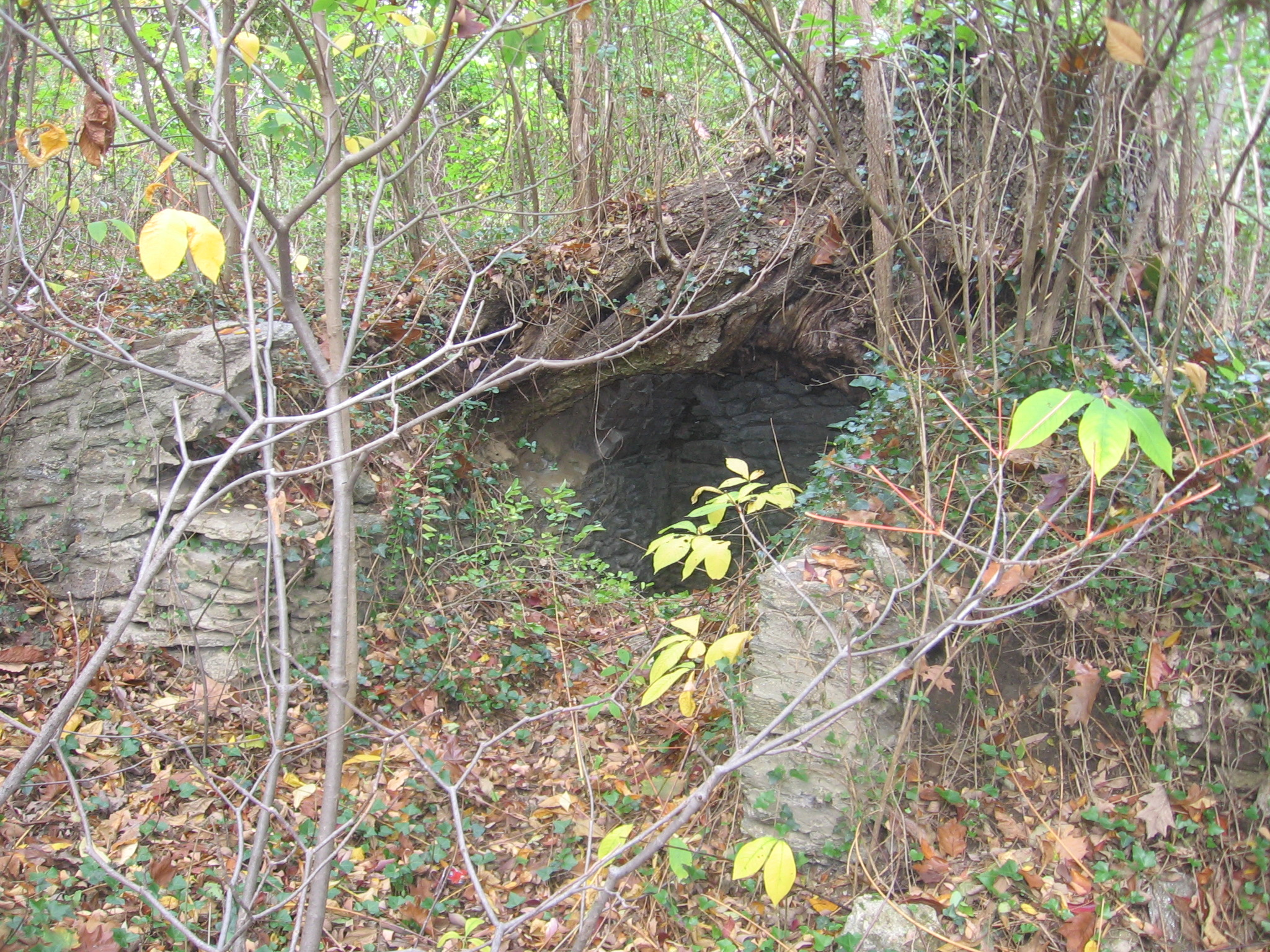
The ruins of Peale's cave in 2010.

To the south of the obelisk, Peale erected another gazebo, in "Chinese [sic] taste, dedicated to meditation. This summer house was simpler than the one built by his son, and only had a flat roof to provide shade, and four posts to hold it up, with seats around the inside. On the same hillside as the Chinese gazebo was a pedestal onto which Peale inscribed ninety memorable events in American history, starting with the discovery of America, and ending with the American victory at New Orleans in 1815. Significantly, he left room to inscribe the first crossing of the Atlantic Ocean by an American steamship.

There were originally seven natural pools and springs that existed within the massive property. Peale took advantage of these natural pools and utilized them to improve his massive garden. He hollowed out the source of the spring into an artificial cave, which he then lined with masonry. This spring fed a greenhouse with a glass ceiling. Unfortunately only two of the original seven pools remain today. The other five have either disappeared due to natural reasons or have been diverted to another location. There used to exist a spring within the "Summer House" until that was diverted along with two pools that existed by the kitchen that fed into a well and one that existed near the lower half of the stable. These have since disappeared and it is unknown exactly how the last two disappeared. To the southeast was a pool with a ten-foot fountain that was fed by pipes from the spring. Next to the pool was a garden shed onto which Peale painted a "gate" to disguise it. On the "gate" were symbols and figures representing Congress, America, Truth, Wisdom, Temperance, and Mars, the Roman God of war. The ruins of Peale's cave and greenhouse still stand. The cave is now underneath the stump of a coffee tree, but the deteriorating masonry is still visible. The greenhouse's walls are to the west, and are mostly overgrown with brush and ivy while the location of Peale's pond has been paved over by a driveway.

While the condition of the gardens and greenhouses may have deteriorated during the unforgiving embrace of time, they once used to be magnificent, with numerous flora of all kinds scattered all throughout the greenhouses and on the grounds. The flora included a fig tree to the south side of the small gardener's cottage along with a box tree only a couple of yards away. This tree was replaced several times during the history of Belfield. There were numerous transplanted trees that are scattered throughout the land but throughout all the years, only one tree can be described as the strongest and longest lasting. This is the old hickory tree that was and still is standing near the greenhouses.

== After Peale ==
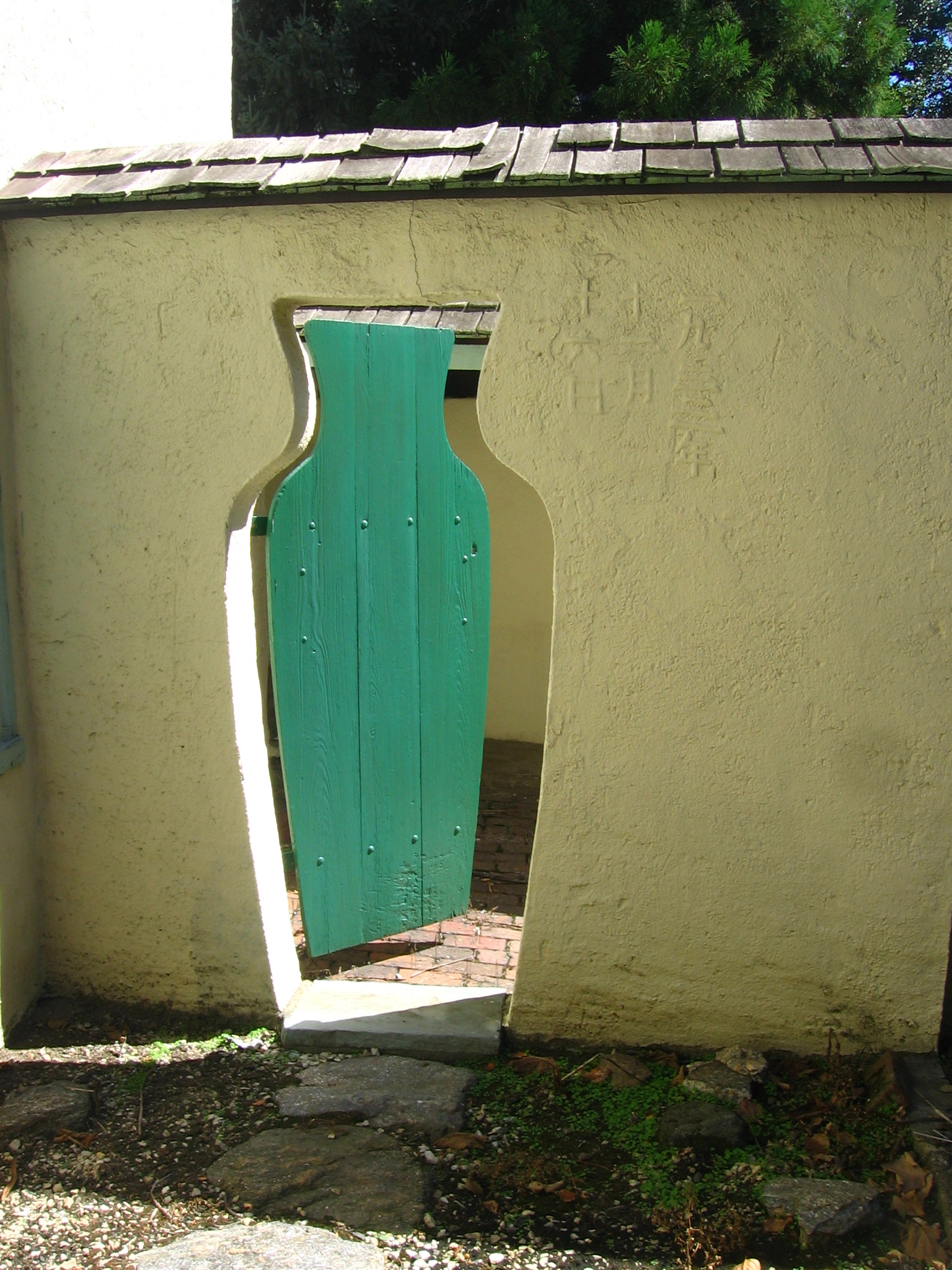
The "Chinese Garden", erected by James and Logan Starr

After purchasing the property from Peale, William Logan Fisher and wife Sarah Lindley Fisher lived on the estate. Sarah Lindley Fisher attracted a lot of guests when she arrived to the estate. Together the two had three children. The first was Sarah Lindley in 1818, the second, Charles William in 1820, and finally Mary Rodman in 1822. William gave the estate to his daughter Sarah upon her marriage to William Wister in 1826. According to the Wister's great-granddaughter, Mary Meigs, Belfield served as a stop on the Underground Railroad, though there is no contemporary evidence of this claim. During this time, William Wister and William Logan Fisher together founded the Belfield Print Works, located at the edge of the property, at the present-day intersection of Belfield Avenue and Wister Street. William Rotch Wister, the Wister's eldest son, and father of horticulturist John Caspar Wister, had a house constructed on the estate in 1868 for his family, this house is now La Salle's Mary and Frances Wister Fine Arts Studio. In 1876, he moved his family across the street to another house he had built, the mansion 'Wister', which was deeded to Fairmount Park and demolished in 1956.

The Wister's second son, John, purchased the remaining property upon Sarah's death in 1891. John Wister made several improvements to the property, installing a furnace in the main house, and building a greenhouse next to the ruins of Peale's. The foundations of this greenhouse survive as of 2010. In July 1907, the carriage house caught fire, causing the panicked Wister family to flee Belfield, though there was no actual damage to the main house.

After John died in 1900, his wife Sallie Wister continued to live at Belfield until her death in 1922. Upon her death, it was discovered that John Wister's will gave Belfield to his second daughter Sarah Logan Wister Starr, who had lived in another house on the property, later dubbed 'The Mansion', since her marriage in 1901. Wister's eldest daughter, Bessie, felt slighted, leading to a feud between the sisters lasting several decades.

During the ownership of Sarah and her husband James Starr, the property had bathrooms installed and underground electric and telephone lines run to it. They had the colonial kitchen restored, and planted citrus trees, and a garden of one hundred Tea Roses. James, who had an interest in China, added several rock gardens and in the rear of the main house, a "Chinese Garden" that still survives. The date of the garden's construction was recorded in Chinese characters on the garden's wall. Also during the Starr's ownership, 20th Street was constructed and a deep trench was cut in the hillside, requiring a 14 foot retaining wall be built along what is now the eastern edge of the estate.

In 1926, La Salle College purchased a portion of land on the east side of 20th Street from the Starrs for $27,500. The remaining portion of the campus was purchased from other descendants of William Logan Fisher.

In 1956, S. Logan Wister Starr and her husband Daniel Blain inherited the mansion from Logan's parents, they kept the property a fully functioning and self-sufficient farm, despite spending most of their time in Nova Scotia. Under the Blains, in 1966, the property was added to the National Register of Historic Places. Having rented 'The Mansion' and another house, 'Shaw Manor', from the Blains since the early 1960s for dormitory space, La Salle purchased both houses in 1968, and demolished them for parking space.

In 1979, Logan Blain died, and her son, Daniel Blain, Jr. sold the remainder of the estate to La Salle University, in 1984.

La Salle University began a renovation of the estate after purchasing it, converting it from a farm into a park-like area. Several structures were demolished, including Peale's stable and hen house, which were leveled to construct a parking lot and later tennis courts. The main house of Belfield, now called 'Peale House', was also converted to the office for the President of La Salle, while the former tenant house on the south end of the property was used for Japanese tea ceremonies from the 1980s until 2007.

== Gallery ==
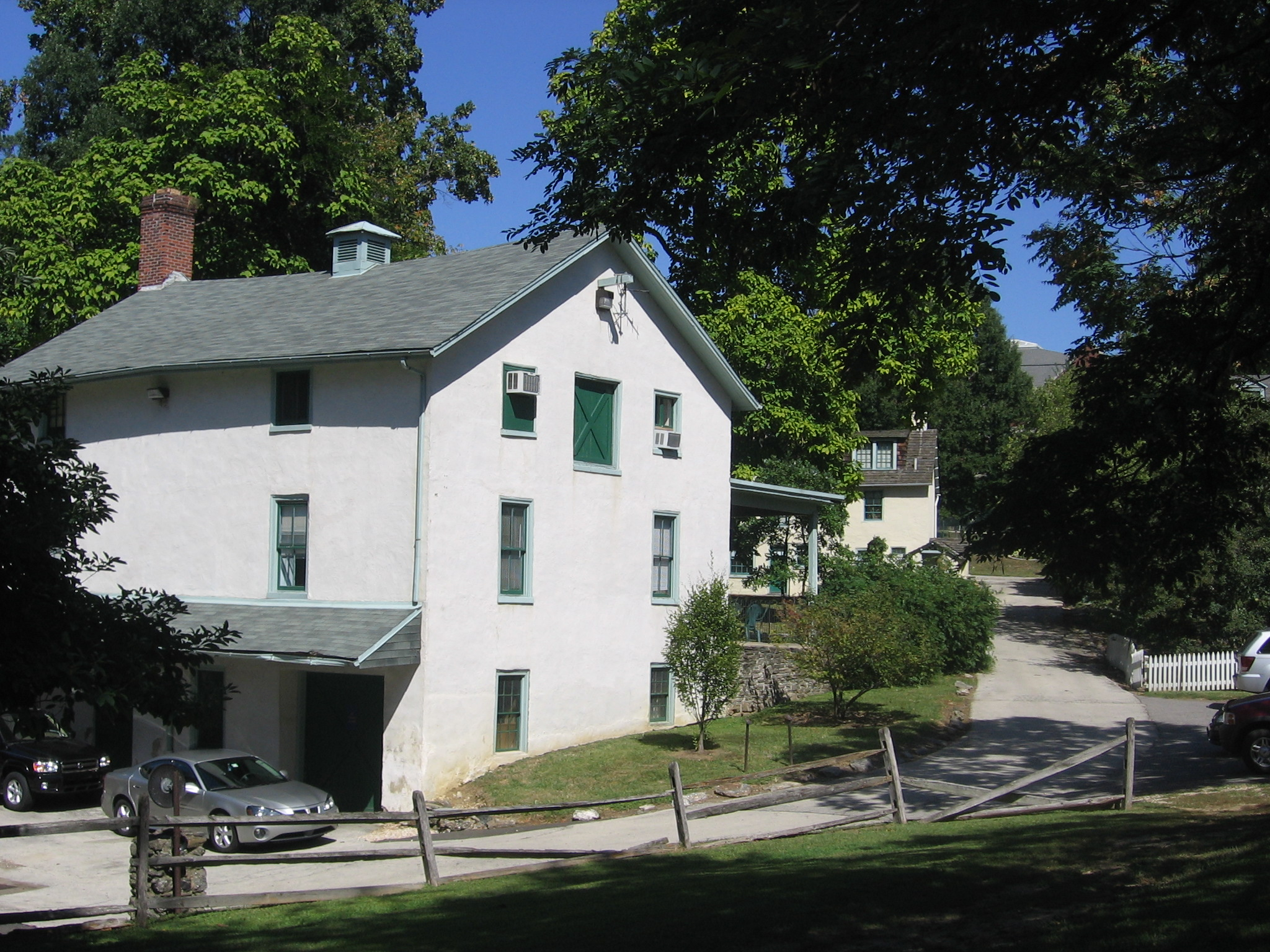
The Wister's carriage house and Peale House.

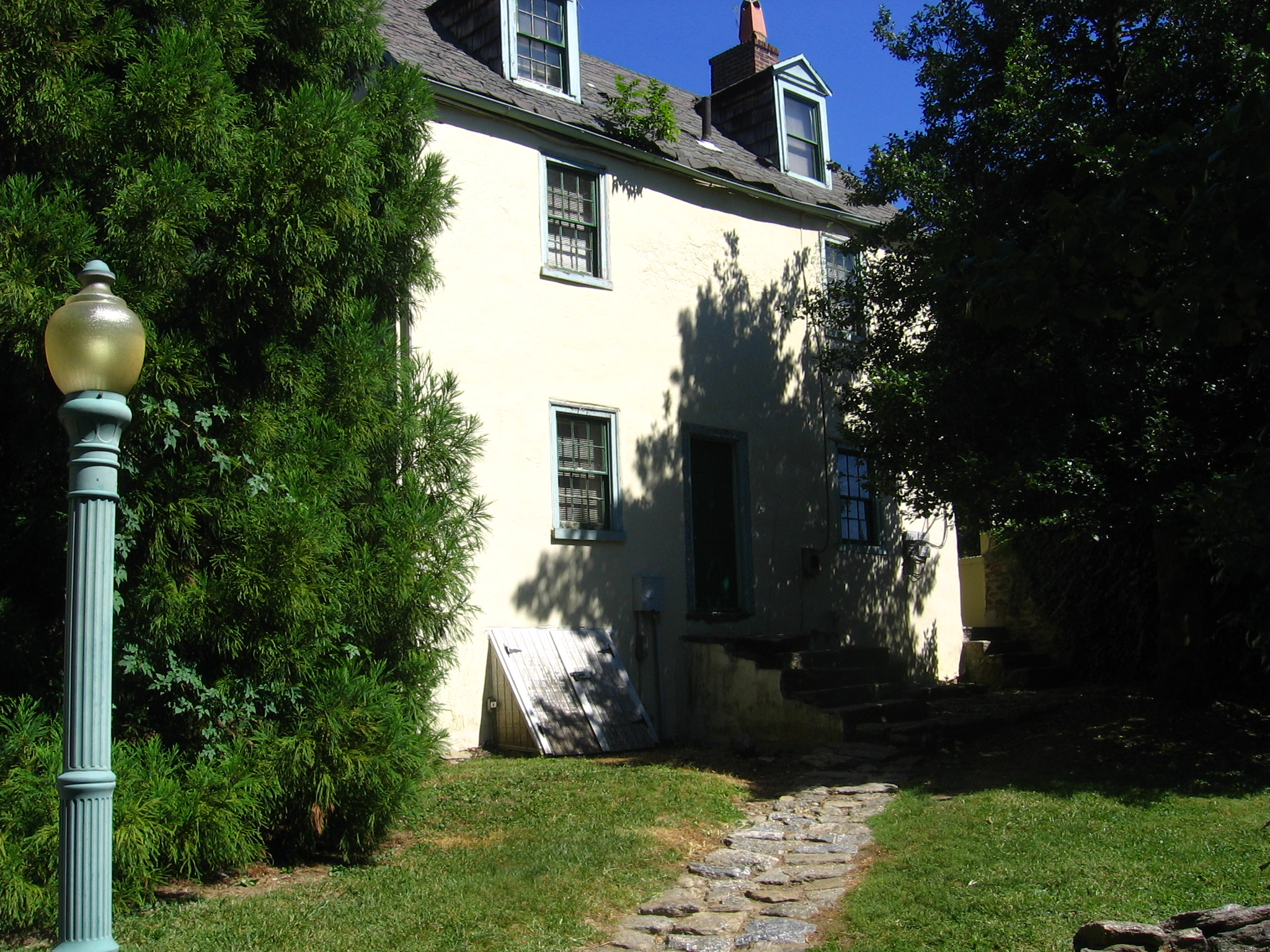
The Gatehouse on the Belfield Estate.

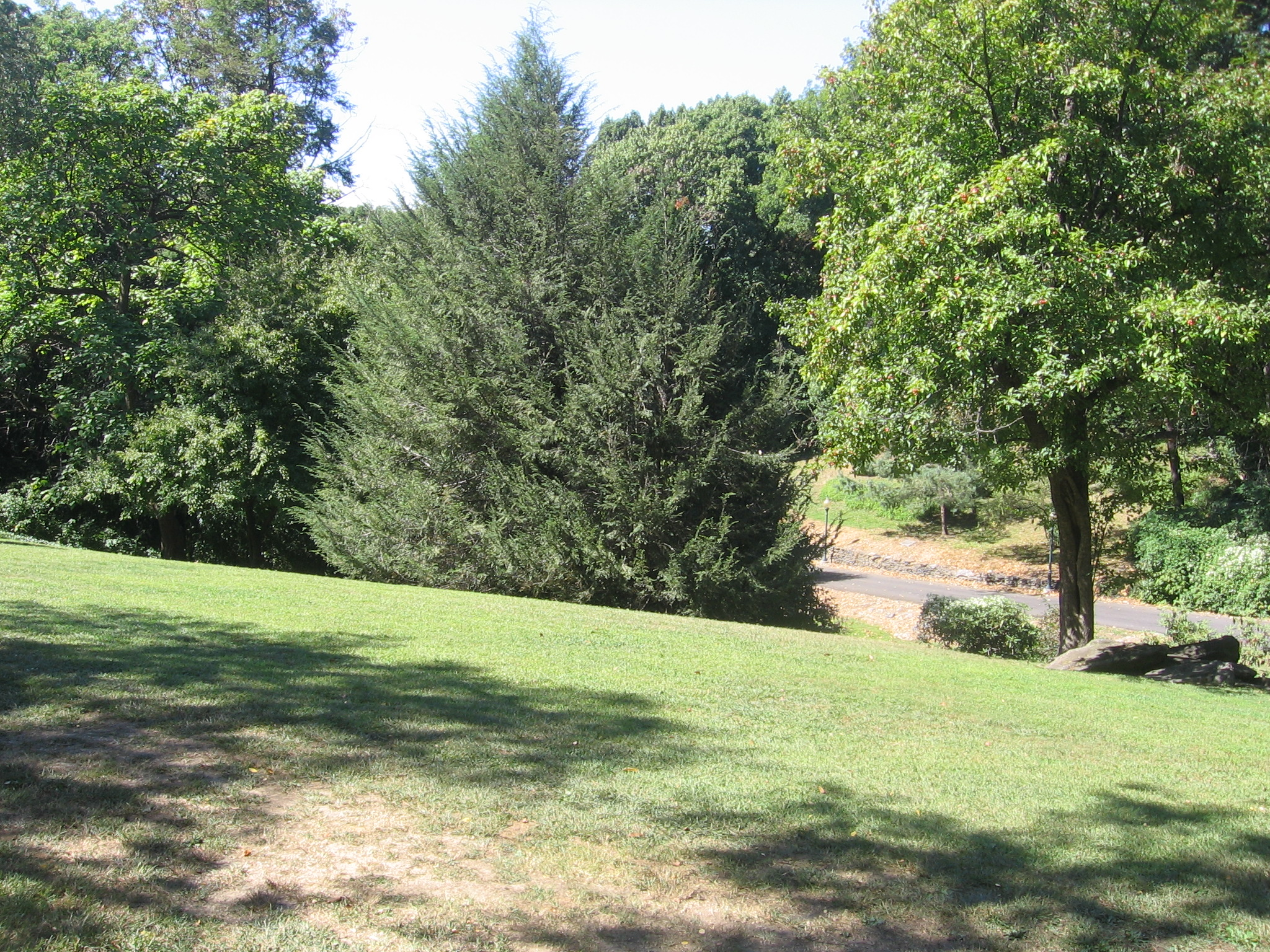
A view looking west from the meadow.

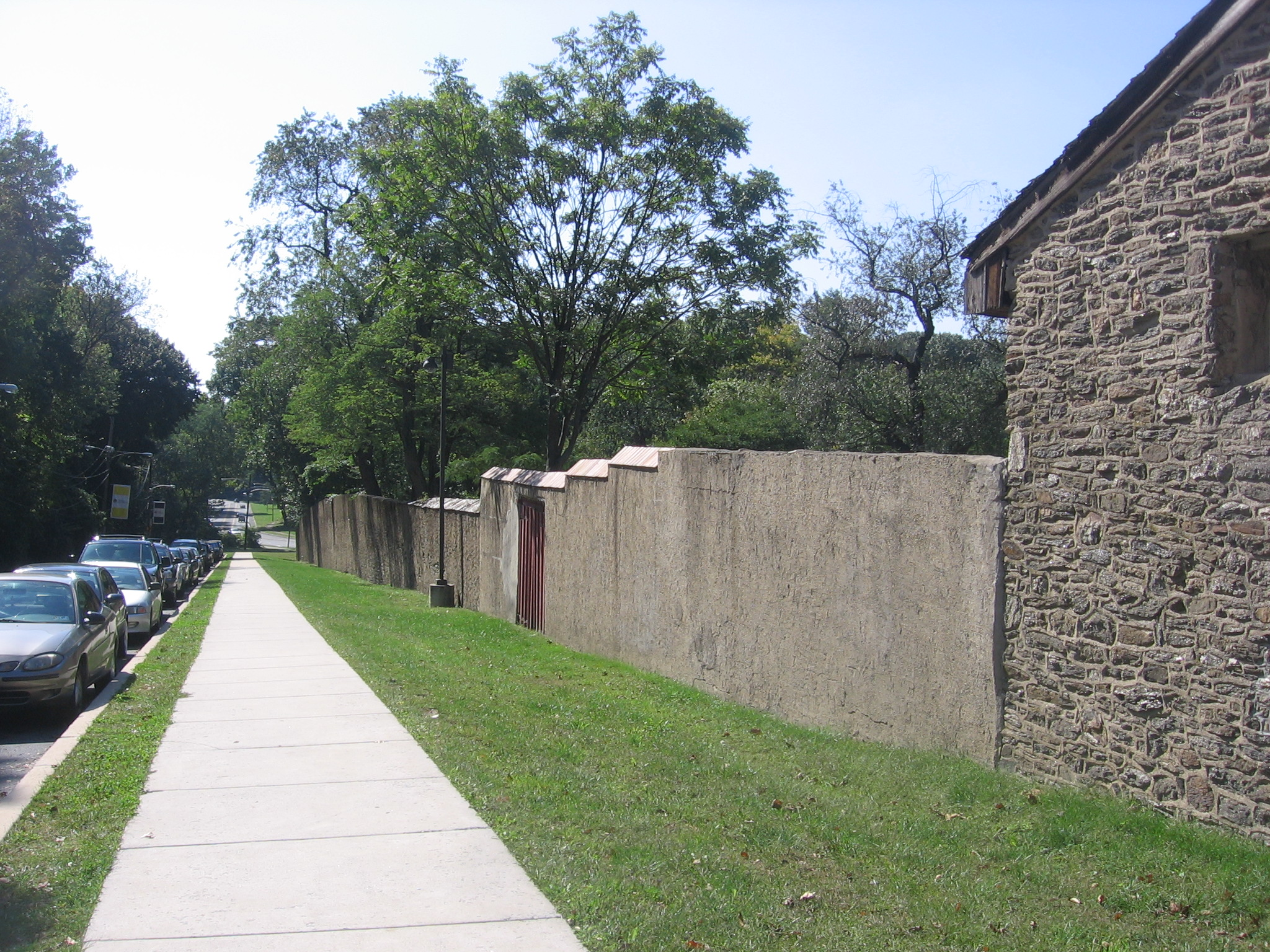
A view looking south along 20th street at the retaining wall.

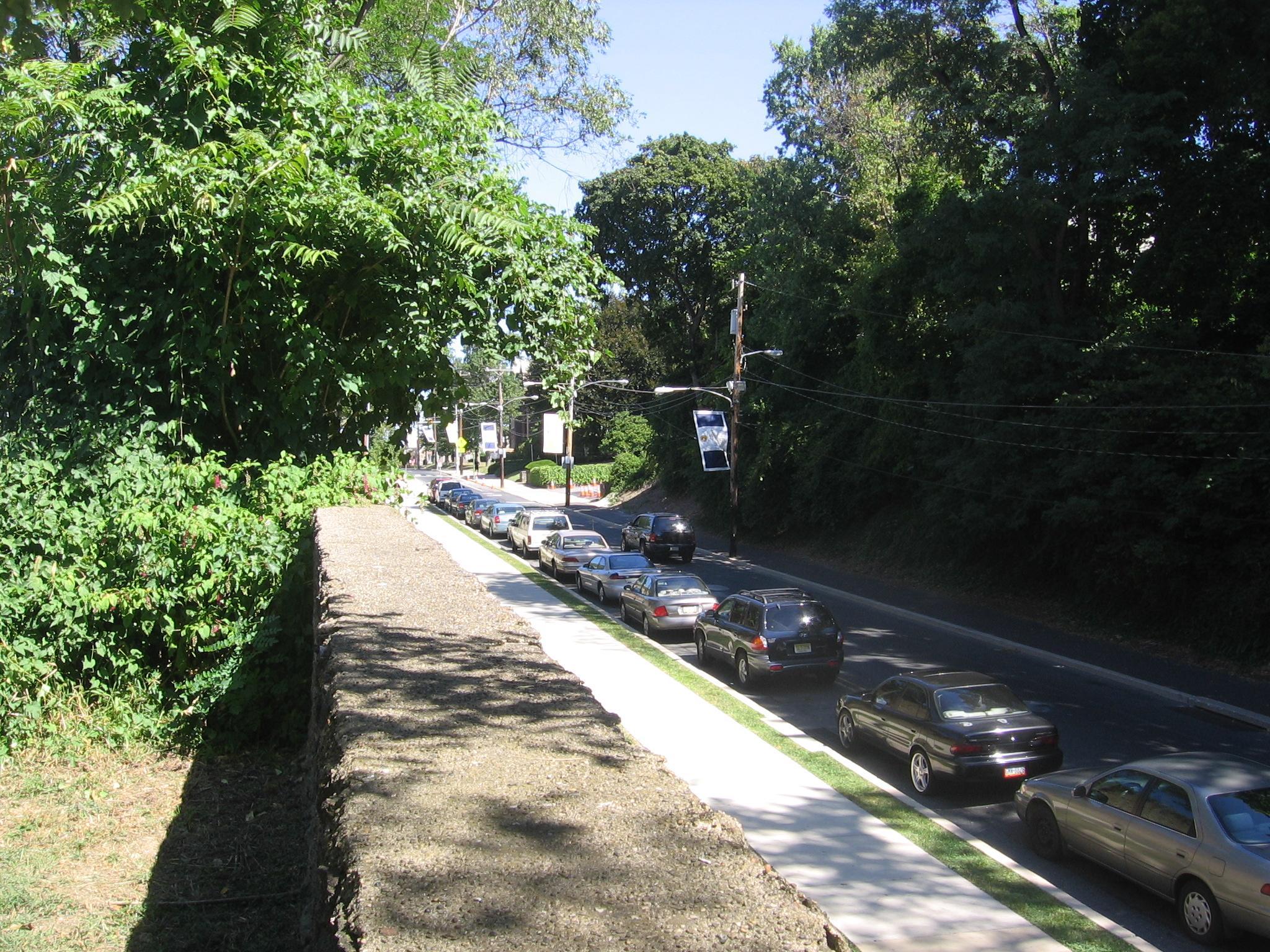
Another view along 20th Street.

== See also ==
- List of National Historic Landmarks in Philadelphia
- National Register of Historic Places in North Philadelphia

== Sources ==
- Butler, James A. (2009). Charles Willson Peale's "Belfield":A History of a National Historic Landmark, 1684-1984. Philadelphia: La Salle University Art Museum.
- Wistar, Caroline; Rudnytzky, Kateryna A. (2009). Charles Willson Peale at Belfield: A Guide to the Historic Farm. Philadelphia: La Salle University Art Museum.
