= Woman's Medical College of Pennsylvania =

College in Philadelphia, Pennsylvania (1850–1970)

Coordinates: 40.01190°N 75.18420°W

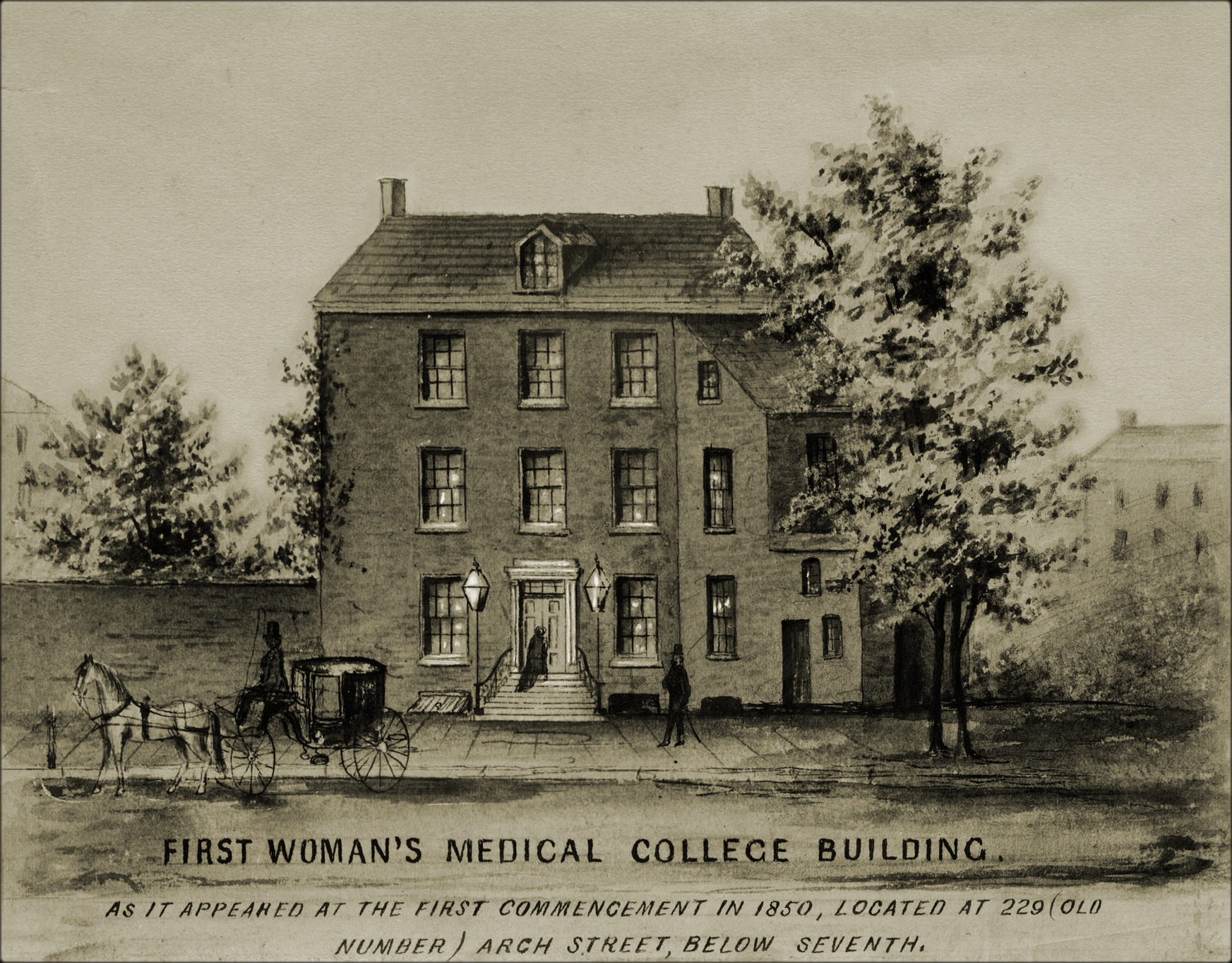
- An 1850 illustration of the first building at Woman's Medical College of Pennsylvania in Philadelphia
- Other name: WMCP
- Former names: Female Medical College of Pennsylvania, Medical College of Pennsylvania
- Active: 1850–1970 (became co-ed Medical College of Pennsylvania)
- Location: 229 Arch Street (until 1858) and then 627 Arch Street (after Philadelphia's street renumbering), Philadelphia, Pennsylvania, U.S.

Founded in 1850, The Woman's Medical College of Pennsylvania (WMCP), formally known as The Female Medical College of Pennsylvania, was the first American medical college dedicated to teaching women medicine and allowing them to earn the Doctor of Medicine degree.

In 1867, the college was renamed the Woman's Medical College. The college has trained thousands of women physicians from all over the world, many of whom went on to practice medicine internationally. In 1970, the college became the co-ed Medical College of Pennsylvania. In 1993, the college and hospital merged with Hahnemann Medical School. In 2003, the two colleges were absorbed by Drexel University College of Medicine.

== History ==
The Woman's Medical College of Pennsylvania is known as one of the earliest women's colleges designed for teaching woman medicine and has a notable history. Established by forward-thinking Quakers, the college was a testament to their belief in women's right to education and their conviction that women should have the opportunity to become physicians.

The Woman's Medical College of Pennsylvania provided educational opportunities and medical training to women of various backgrounds. Some of these pioneers were among the first of their race or country to earn medical degrees. Opportunities to earn a Western medicine degree were offered to the first Native American women and to African-American women, as well as to women from India, Syria, Japan and Canada.

At the time, the college was known to provide a rare opportunity for women to teach, perform research, and learn to manage and run a medical school, all due in part to the establishment of Women's Hospital in 1861-this also allowed women to learn and practice in a hospital setting.

In 1930, the college opened its new campus in the East Falls section of Philadelphia, This facility combined teaching and hospital clinical care in one. It was the first purpose-built hospital in the nation.

The college was the longest-lasting women's medical college in America. It became coeducational in 1970 when it admitted four men, and in 1970, the school changed its name to The Medical College of Pennsylvania.

In 1993, the college and hospital merged with Hahnemann Medical School.

In 2003, the two colleges were absorbed by Drexel University College of Medicine.

== Founders and early faculty ==
William J. Mullen (1805–1882) served as the first president of the Board of Corporators of Woman's Medical College. Mullen was a wealthy manufacturer turned philanthropist best known for advocating prison reform. Additionally, Mullen worked as a prison agent and established the House of Industry in Philadelphia, a neighborhood center that assisted immigrants and people experiencing homelessness.

Joseph S. Longshore (1809–1879), was a Quaker activist-physician and abolition advocate.

Dr. Bartholomew Fussell (1794–1871) an abolitionist and uncle to Dr. Edwin Fussell (1813–1882), one of the earliest faculty members.

R.C. Smedley's History of the Underground Railroad cites Bartholomew Fussell as proposing, in 1846, the idea for a college that would train female doctors. It was a tribute to his departed sister, who Bartholomew believed could have been a doctor if women had been given the opportunity then.

At a meeting at Fussell's house, in Kennett Square, Pennsylvania. Fussell invited five doctors to carry out his idea. The doctors invited were: Edwin Fussell (Bartholomew's nephew) M.D., Franklin Taylor, M.D., Ellwood Harvey, M.D., Sylvester Birdsall, M.D., and Dr. Ezra Michener.

Dr. Fussell would support the college, but had little to do with it after it started in 1850 in Philadelphia.

Ellwood Harvey, who attended the 1846 meeting, began teaching at the college in 1852.

The Feminist Movement during the early to mid-19th century generated support for the Female Medical College of Pennsylvania. The Society of Friends in Philadelphia, a large group of Quakers, supported the women's rights movements and the development of the Female MCP. MCP was initially located in the rear of 229 Arch Street in Philadelphia; it was changed to 627 Arch Street when Philadelphia renumbered streets in 1858. In July 1861, the board of corroborators of the Female Medical College of Pennsylvania chose to rent rooms for the college from the Woman's Hospital of Philadelphia on North College Avenue.

== Administration ==
The first dean of what was then known as the Female Medical College was Nathaniel R. Mosely, who served in the position from 1850 until 1856. The second dean was also a man, Edwin B. Fussell, who held the position from 1856 to 1866. From then on, the Woman's College had a long history of female deans. Ann Preston was the first woman to be a dean of this medical college. Dr. Preston was a dedicated dean. She was determined to provide woman's medical college students with the best clinical training by arranging for her students to attend clinical demonstrations at the Blockley Almshouse in West Philadelphia.

The following women were deans of the college in the years stated:

- 1866–1872, Ann Preston
- 1872–1874, Emeline Horton Cleveland
- 1874–1886, Rachel Bodley
- 1886/1888–1917, Clara Marshall
- 1917–1940, Martha Tracy (Henry Jump served as interim dean during Tracy's sabbatical.)
- 1940/1943–1943/1946, Margaret Craighill
- 1946–1963, Marion Spencer Fay

No woman was found to replace Marion Fay. After her, the position of dean was held by Glen R. Leymaster from 1964 to 1970, at which time the institution became known as the Medical College of Pennsylvania.

== Issues in clinical training ==
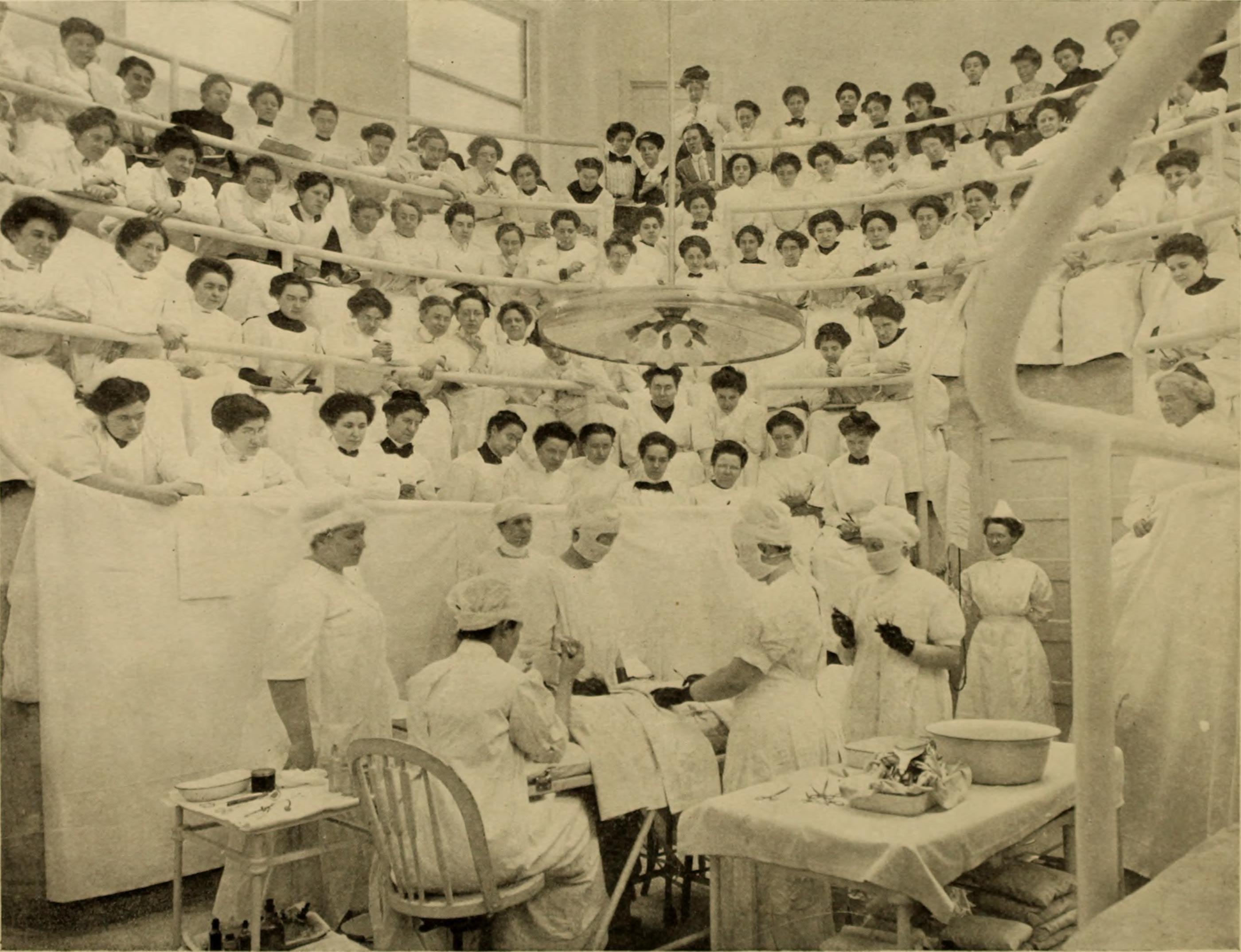
The new Amphitheatre, 1911

The Female Medical College of Pennsylvania faced difficulties in providing clinical training for its students, because women oftentimes struggled to be accepted in the male-dominated world of medicine. Ann Preston won a right to expand clinical training for her female students. When the woman attended lectures in the surgical amphitheater, they were greeted with catcalls and were assaulted with spit, spitballs, and tobacco juice by the male medical students.

Almost all medical institutions were confronted with the demand for more clinical practice due to the rise of surgery, physical diagnosis, and clinical specialties. During the 1880s, clinical instruction at the Woman's Medical College of Pennsylvania relied mainly on the demonstration clinics.

In 1887, Anna Broomall, professor of obstetrics for the Woman's Medical College of Pennsylvania, established a maternity outpatient service in a poor area of South Philadelphia for student education. By 1895, many students cared for three or four women giving birth.

== East Falls campus and Drexel University ==
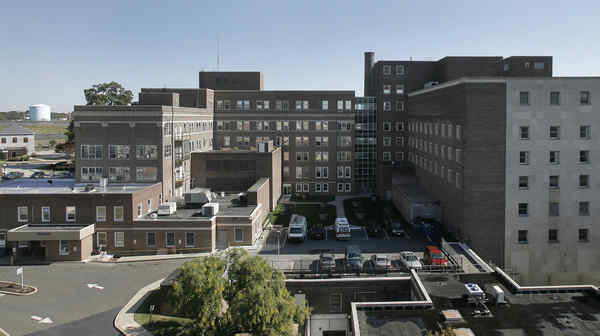
Falls Center

The East Falls Campus was the first purpose-built hospital in the nation. Its design allowed both teaching and hospital care to take place in one facility, helping provide more clinical care. Post-WWII housing shortages in the city were a catalyst for the development of additions to the East Falls Campus. The first of these was the Ann Preston Building (designed by Thaddeus Longstreth), which provided housing and classrooms for student nurses.

Today, the building is known as the Falls Center. It is operated by Iron Stone Real Estate Partners as student housing, commercial space, and medical offices.

In 1993, the Medical College of Pennsylvania merged with Hahnemann Medical College, retaining its Queen Lane campus. In 2003, the two medical colleges were absorbed as a part of Drexel University College of Medicine, creating new opportunities for the large student body for clinical practice in settings ranging from urban hospitals to small rural practices.

== Notable alumni ==
- Honoria Acosta-Sison, who graduated in 1909, was the first Filipino woman to become a medical doctor, eventually serving as professor of obstetrics and gynecology and head of the department at the University of the Philippines.
- Ella Garber (Bauman), who graduated in 1924, was the founder of the Champa General Hospital in Champa, India. She served as a missionary there form 1926–1961. On returning to the US she served as director of Cancer Prevention at Allentown General Hospital.
- Rebecca Cole was the first black graduate of the Woman's Medical College to be awarded an MD in 1867. She was followed by Caroline Still Anderson, Eliza Ann Grier, Matilda Evans, and Georgianna E. Patterson Young.
- Katherine Rotan Drinker (1888-1956), graduated in 1914, occupational hygienist with the Harvard School of Public Health
- Marie K. Formad (1860-1944), surgeon, gynecologist, and pathologist at Woman's Medical College of Pennsylvania
- Ruth A. Gerry (1828–1876), early female Michigan physician, suffragist, lobbied University of Michigan Medical School to admit women.
- Sabat Islambouli, who graduated in 1890, was the first female physician from Syria.
- Mary Putnam Jacobi (1842–1906) was a leading American woman medical scientist of the nineteenth century.
- Anandi Gopal Joshi, who graduated in 1886, was the first Indian woman doctor and one of the first Indian women to practice Western Medicine in India.
- Gurubai Karmarkar, who graduated in 1892, was the second Indian woman doctor and missionary whose practice focused mainly on the most disenfranchised members of the Indian caste system.
- Kei Okami, who graduated in 1889, was the first Japanese woman to obtain a degree in Western medicine.
- Jane Paine (1825–1882) graduated (first in her class) in 1861, the ninth graduating class of the Woman's Medical College. Her thesis addressed “A disquisition on women as physicians.” In 2018, a commemorative historical marker was placed in Mount Vernon, Ohio, where she practiced medicine.
- Susan La Flesche Picotte was the first Native American woman to earn a medical degree.
- Ann Preston, a member of the first graduating class of the WMCP and later became the first female dean of a medical school in the United States.
- Georgianna Rumbley
- Ellis Reynolds Shipp
- Laura Matilda Towne, who founded the Penn School in 1862.
- Charlotte Yhlen, who graduated in 1873, became the first Swedish women to graduate from a medical school; she married pioneering engineer Tinius Olsen
- Bernice R. Walters Nordstrom, who graduated in 1936, the first woman doctor to actually serve aboard a U.S. Navy ship.

In the nineteenth century, the college admitted a number of Jewish students.

== In popular culture ==
In the TV series, "Dr. Quinn, Medicine Woman," fictional Dr. Michaela Quinn (Jane Seymour), graduates from this college.

== See also ==
- List of defunct medical schools in the United States
- List of female scientists before the 20th century
- Women in medicine

== Further research ==
- Archives at Drexel University College of Medicine
- Woman's Medical College of Pennsylvania materials in the South Asian American Digital Archive (SAADA)
- Dr. Ellwood Harvey, Underground Railroad Conductor on Facebook
