= Sarah Logan Wister Starr =

Sarah Logan Wister Starr (1873 - August 21, 1956) was a prominent member of Philadelphia society in the early 1900s and a dedicated humanitarian.

== Family ==
Named after her grandmother, Sarah Logan Fisher, Wister was born in Duncannon, Pennsylvania, near Philadelphia. Her father, John Wister, was descended from the wealthy Wisters of Philadelphia, and her grandmother was descended from James Logan, secretary to William Penn.

Sarah had three sisters. The first, Jane Boas, died in 1869 at age three before the others were born. Elizabeth was born next, followed by Sarah and the youngest, Margaret. Even as a young woman, Sarah was dignified and proper and "held high the banner of family morality." She was seen as the opposite of wild and unpredictable Elizabeth.

== Married life ==
In 1901, 28-year-old Sarah married James Starr, a mining official also descended from James Logan. Starr, an 1891 graduate of the University of Pennsylvania who also earned a degree in Mining Engineering the following year from Towne Scientific School, was known for his collection of Chinese stamps.

Mary Meigs, Sarah’s niece, describes Sarah’s and Elizabeth’s choices in husbands:

“They selected for husbands, businessmen who were as much alike as Tweedledum and Tweedledee. Their names were Stewart and Jim, both had benevolent faces and handlebar moustaches, and, at parties, chewed on their cigars and listened to their wives… ‘Jim of course never speaks if he can help it…speaking is against his principles’… ‘Jim actually interrupts!’ But his little flare of rebellion was quickly extinguished and I remember only his good-natured silences while Aunt Sarah’s tongue reeled out like a string with a colourful kite dancing at the end.

Later, Meigs describes Sarah’s marriage as "dreary…like a man and wife yoked together like a couple of oxen, plodding along in gloomy silence or to the sound of a monologue."

She and James are interred at Laurel Hill Cemetery, Philadelphia, Section G, Plot 202 & 204

== Homestead ==
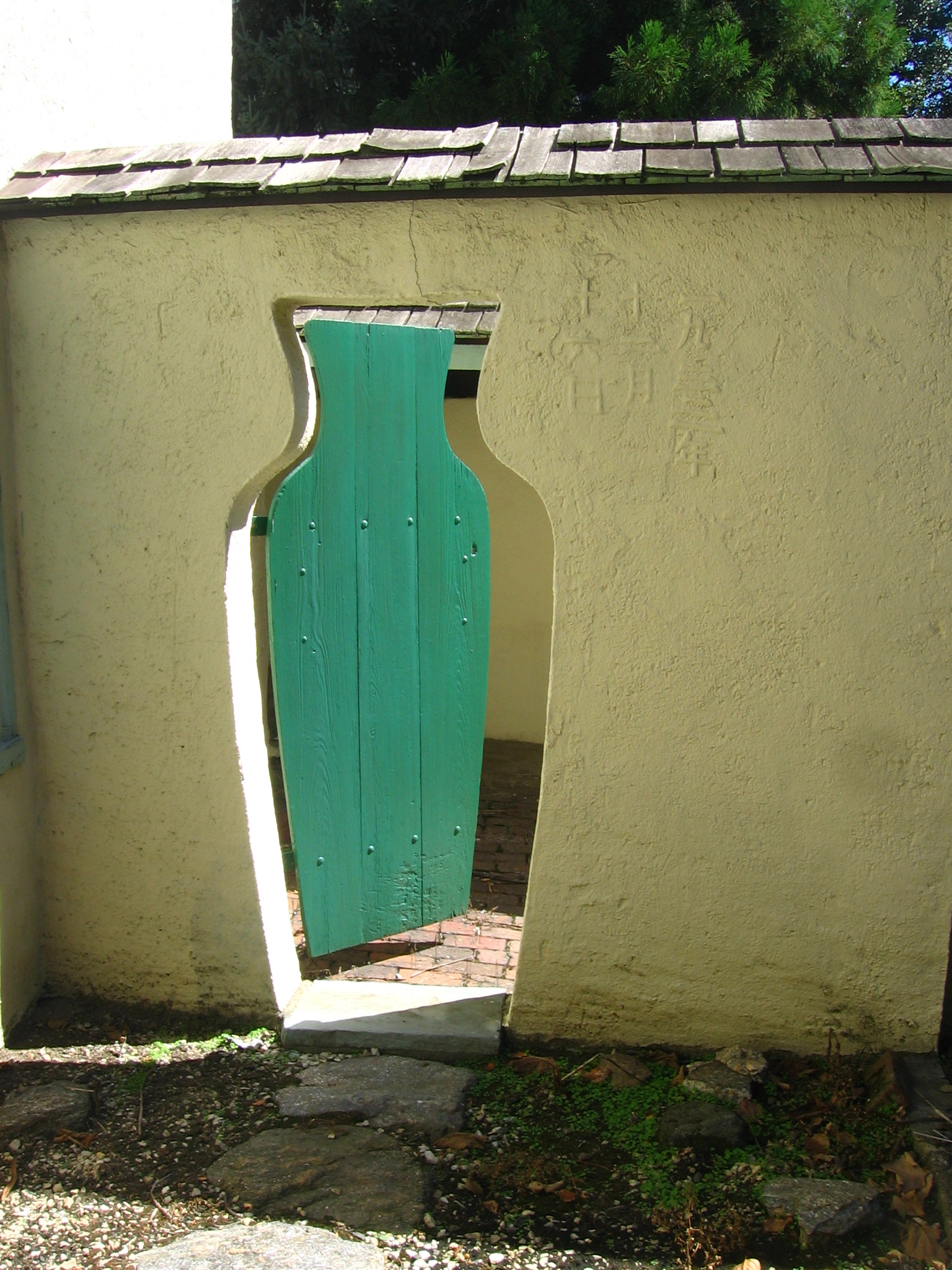
The Starr's "Chinese Garden" in 2010. The Chinese characters are still visible to the door's right.

After her mother died in 1922, Sarah received ownership of the Belfield Estate, a Philadelphia homestead that had been passed down through the Wister family for years, and which had once been owned by the artist Charles Willson Peale. Elizabeth's anger at not receiving Belfield led to a feud between the two sisters that lasted for 30 years, until the death of Sarah’s husband brought them partially back together.

Sarah made several changes to the estate. Telephone and electricity were added via underground wires, so as not to disturb the garden. Upon the opening of nearby 20th Street, a restraining wall 900 feet long and in some places 14 feet high was built to provide security and protection from heavy traffic and passersby. James added water and rock gardens. Sarah herself added a garden of 100 hybrid tea roses. After a trip to China in 1933, they reworked a section of the garden in Chinese style. “A plastered stone wall, separated by a tiny hip roof and an entrance to it is made through a large vase-shaped gate, on one side of which appears, in red, the Chinese characters which denote the year, month, and day of its erection.” The garden also holds an orange and a lemon tree taken from the orangery of Butler Place when Owen Wister sold it. Belfield Estate is now part of La Salle University’s campus.

== Community service ==
From 1921-41, Wister served as president of the Woman’s Medical College of Pennsylvania, where she set up a $300,000 Wister Fund in honor of her parents. The college used the money to add buildings on the site purchased in 1953 at Falls of Schuylkill.

She was the president of the Colonial Dames for many years, as well as president of the Women’s Permanent Emergency Association of Germantown, which was founded more than 60 years earlier by her grandmother, and revived during World War II.

She accepted honorary degrees from Ursinus College in 1933 and the University of Pennsylvania in 1941.

She was an Associate Trustee of the Board of Libraries at Penn. She founded the Zoé Vallé Memorial Library at Chester, Nova Scotia, where her family had summered since 1874.

She also served as the State Vice-Chairman of the World War I-era National League for Woman's Services, as well as the chairman of the Germantown Branch. She raised more than $2 million for the relief of Belgian children. She was also chosen the chairman of the Women’s Committee of the Liberty Loan for the Federal Reserve District.

With Frances Anne Wister and her cousin Anne Wister, she helped produce a magazine called "The Sparrow." In June 1917, she led the first loan parade for the Liberty Loan campaign, where several hundred women marched from the Woman’s Club of Germantown to the grounds of the Germantown Academy. For the first time, women had charge of booths on the streets where loan subscriptions were received. In 1937, she was an emissary of Pennsylvania Tercentenary Commission of Sweden and was later honored there by the King.

Wister was also a former chairman of the Germantown Branch of the Civic Club, and belonged to the Acron Club, the Print Club, Sedgely Club, Germantown Historical Society, Historical Society of Pennsylvania, The Philadelphia Assembly, Athenaeum Society, Fountain Society and the Society for the Preservation of Landmarks.

== Historic preservation ==
In 1938, she wrote an article, “History of Stenton”, recording the genealogy of those who lived on the Logan family estate and relates stories told by her grandmother and other relatives. She also wrote "History of Belfield", a brief pamphlet about the estate since Peale's time. Her papers at the Historical Society of Pennsylvania include manuscripts of talks she gave on historical topics, particularly from the Colonial Period.
