= Eliza Ann Grier =

American physician (1864–1902)

Eliza Anna Grier
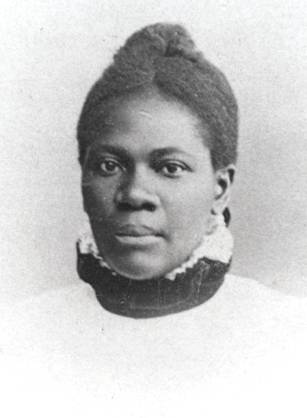
- Born: 1864; Mecklenburg County, North Carolina, United States
- Died: 1902 (aged 37–38); Charlotte, North Carolina, US
- Education: Fisk University (1891); Woman's Medical College of Pennsylvania (1897)
- Scientific career
- Fields: Obstetrics and gynecology

Eliza Anna Grier (Note: Grier's name varies, depending on source. See letter from Grier to Susan B. Anthony dated 3-7-1901 showing Grier's use of Eliza Anna Grier.) (1864–1902) was an American physician and the first African American woman licensed to practice medicine in the U.S. state of Georgia.

== Early life and education ==
Grier was born in Mecklenburg County, North Carolina in 1864 to Emily and George Washington Grier. Although she was born after the Emancipation Proclamation, she was born enslaved as she resided in the part of North Carolina not occupied by the Union Army. She was emancipated at the end of the American Civil War, as an infant.

Grier moved to Nashville, Tennessee to study teaching at Fisk University. In order to be able to afford her tuition fees, she alternated every year of studying with working; after enrolling in 1884, she graduated in 1891.

Grier wrote to the Woman's Medical College of Pennsylvania in 1890 to explain that she had very little money and inquired whether assistance "might be provided for an emancipated slave to receive any help into so lofty a profession." She was accepted into the college in 1893 and once again worked in between periods of studying to support herself. Eliza worked for a year picking cotton to pay for the next year's tuition. Grier graduated after seven years.

== Career ==
After graduating from the Woman's Medical College of Pennsylvania in 1897, Grier moved to Atlanta, Georgia and applied for a license to practice medicine in Fulton County, making her the first African American woman to hold a medical license in the state of Georgia. Grier set up a private practice in Atlanta, specializing in obstetrics and gynecology.

Grier said, "When I saw colored women doing all the work in cases of accouchement, and all the fee going to some white doctor who merely looked on, I asked myself why should I not get the fee myself. [...] Some of the best white doctors in the city have welcomed me, and say that they will give me an even chance in the profession. That is all I ask."

After graduating from medical school, Grier "struggled to build a private practice," supplementing her income with teaching jobs. She fell ill in 1901, just three years after opening her practice, and was unable to work. She wrote to suffragist Susan B. Anthony to request help with her financial troubles. Anthony did not help Grier financially, but did contact Woman's Medical College on her behalf, writing:

To the President of the Women’s Medical College, Philadelphia PA. I send you the enclosed letter because Miss Grier claims to have graduated from your college, and because I think you can help her better than anyone else. She has undertaken a herculean task in that little old town of Greenville. If she is a woman of thrift and management she ought to have help to get started, but her getting the grippe is certainly bad. My sympathies are very strong for all these women, but my purse is not equal to helping them financially. Cannot you suggest to the girl some way out of her trouble?

Grier moved to Albany, Georgia, where her brother Richard Edgar Grier, also a physician, worked. She died in 1902, five years after beginning to practice medicine, and was buried in Charlotte, North Carolina.
