= Elizabeth A. Follansbee =

American medical doctor

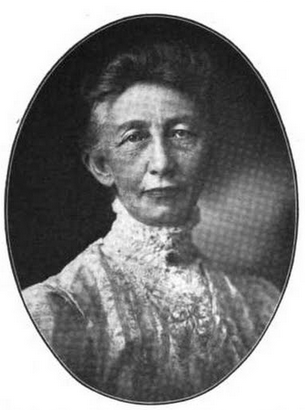
Elizabeth A. Follansbee, from a 1910 publication.

Elizabeth Ann Follansbee (December 9, 1839 – August 22, 1917) was an American medical doctor, the first woman on the faculty of a medical school in California.

== Early life ==
Elizabeth Ann Follansbee was born in Pittston, Maine, or possibly Dorchester, Massachusetts, the daughter Nancy Sherman (Macintosh) and sea captain Alonzo Follansbee. She was the great-granddaughter of Roger Sherman, a signer of the Declaration of Independence. She attended medical school at the University of California, one of only two women students enrolled there in 1875. Facing much resistance, she left after a year and continued her medical training at the University of Michigan, before completing her degree in 1877 at the Woman's Medical College of Pennsylvania.

== Career ==
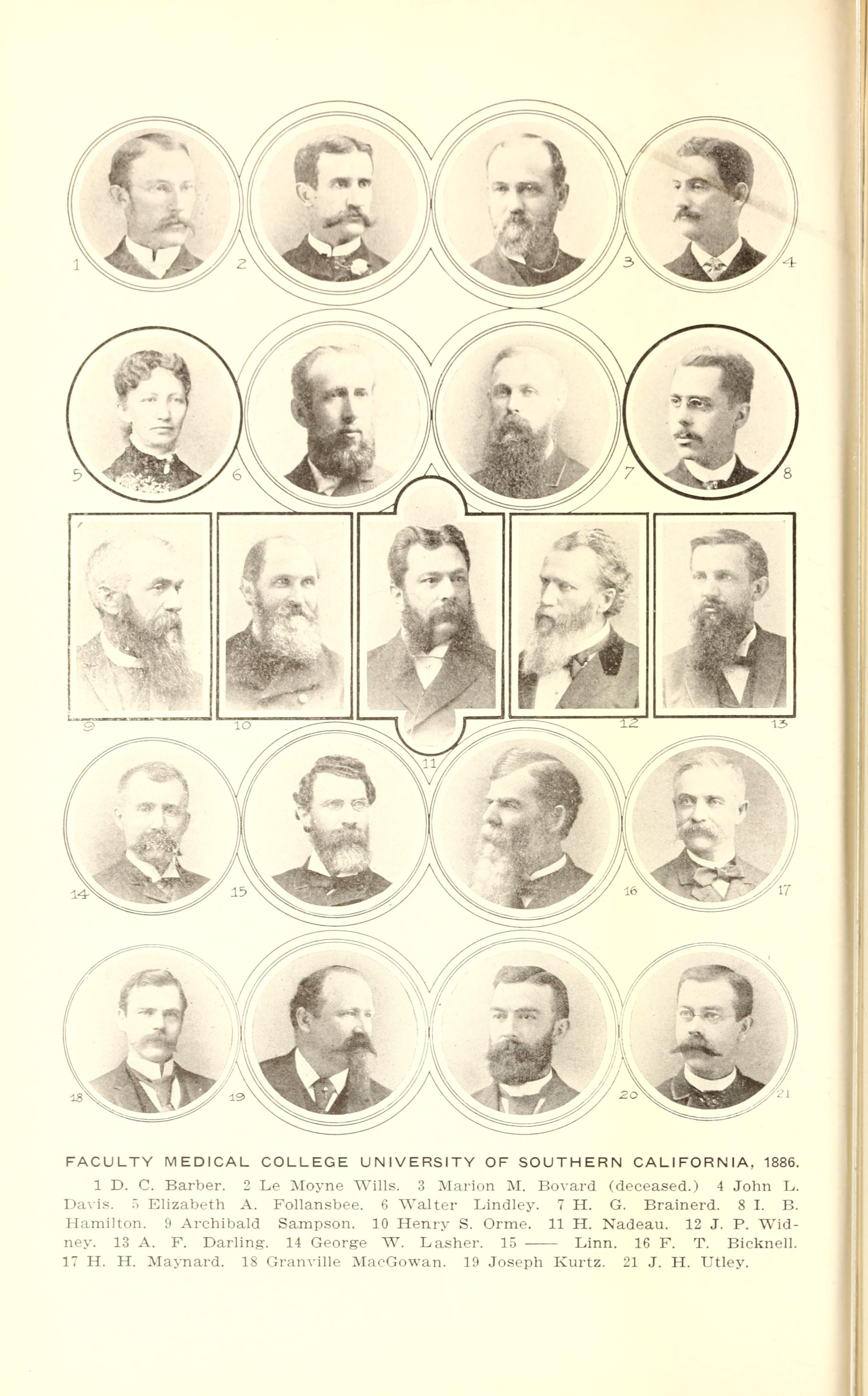
A photo spread of the faculty members of the medical school at Southern California, published in 1905, with Follansbee as the only woman professor.

Follansbee returned to California. Along with Charlotte Blake Brown and a few other women doctors, she co-founded the Women and Children's Hospital of San Francisco. For health reasons she moved to Los Angeles in 1883, where she was the first woman admitted as a member of the Los Angeles County Medical Association. She taught pediatrics and chaired the pediatrics department at the University of Southern California, "the first woman medical school faculty member in California". She arranged for women medical school graduates of the school to intern at the Children's Hospital of San Francisco.

She was an assistant editor of The California Medical and Surgical Reporter when it launched in 1905. For two years, she shared a small practice in pediatrics with Rose Talbot Bullard, another early woman physician in Los Angeles. She was also on-call physician at the Florence Home for Erring Girls in the 1890s. When Charlotte Blake Brown died in 1904, Follansbee wrote her colleague's obituary for a professional journal.

== Personal life ==
Follansbee died in 1917, aged 77 years, in Los Angeles. In 1919, the Cabrillo Chapter of the Daughters of the American Revolution raised money to dedicate a children's hospital bed in memory of Follansbee.
