= Marion Spencer Fay =

American physician and academic administrator (1896–1990)

- Born: July 24, 1896; New Orleans, Louisiana, US
- Died: May 20, 1990 (aged 93)
- Education: Yale University (PhD); University of Colorado (MS); Tulane University (BA)
- Occupations: Physician, dean, educator

Marion Spencer Fay (July 24, 1896 – May 20, 1990) was an American physician, dean, teacher, and advocate. She served as president and dean of the Woman's Medical College of Pennsylvania in Philadelphia from 1946 to 1963.

== Biography ==
Born in New Orleans in 1896, Fay earned a bachelor of arts degree from Newcomb College of Tulane University in 1915, a master's degree from the University of Colorado in 1922, and a PhD in physiological chemistry from Yale University. In 1925, she began teaching at the University of Texas. In 1935, she became a professor of physiological chemistry at the Woman’s Medical College of Pennsylvania. Fay served as acting dean in 1943 and succeeded Margaret Craighill as dean of the College in 1946.

In 1959, Fay became president and dean of the College, the only woman in the United States to serve in this dual role at a medical school. She oversaw the teaching hospital, medical school, and nursing school, including more than one hundred faculty and staff. The college expanded significantly during her tenure. After retiring in 1963, she returned to serve as acting president in 1970.

Fay died on May 20, 1990, at the age of 93.

== Legacy ==
Drexel University issues the annual Marion Spencer Fay Award to a woman physician or scientist "who has made an exceptionally significant contribution to health care" and "who exhibits significant future potential." The National Board for Women in Medicine established the award in Fay's honor in 1963. Past honorees included Julie Overbaugh, Nina F. Schor, and Reshma Jagsi.
