= Charlotte Yhlen =

Swedish physician

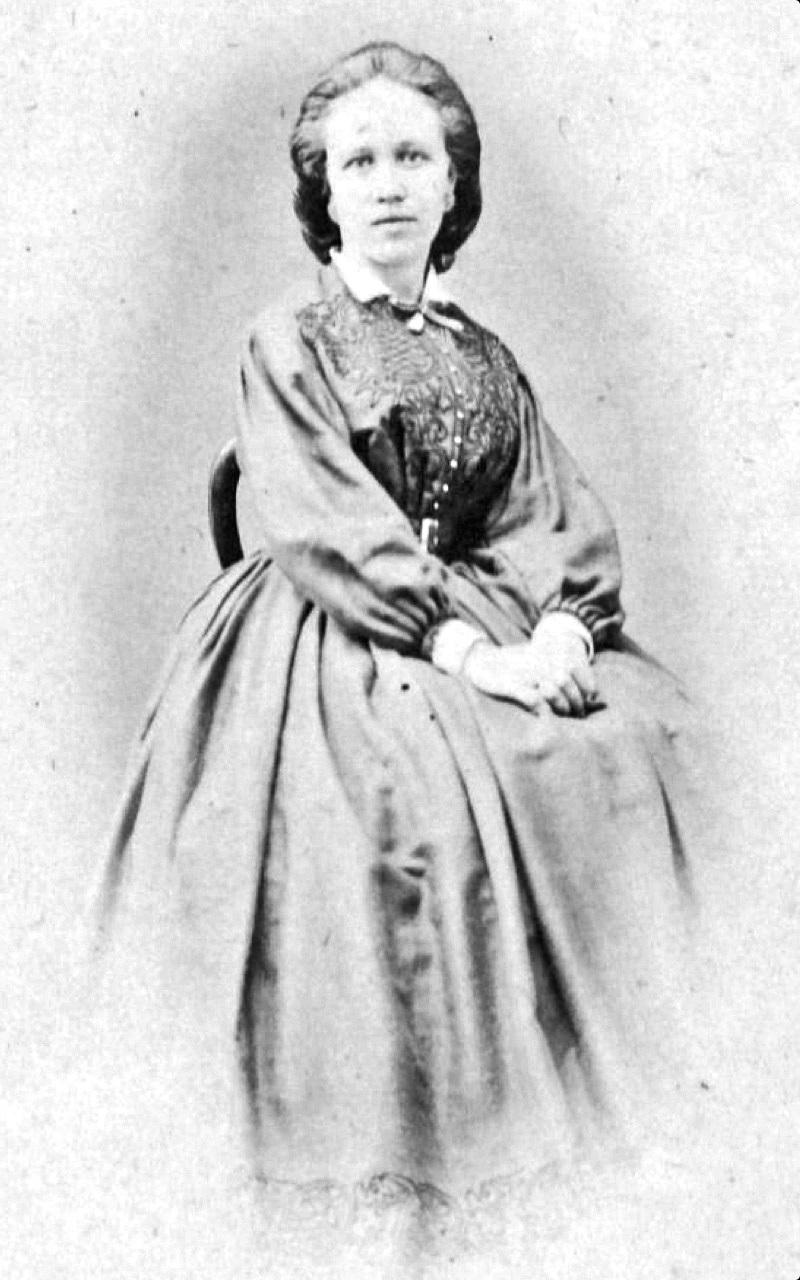
Charlotte Yhlen

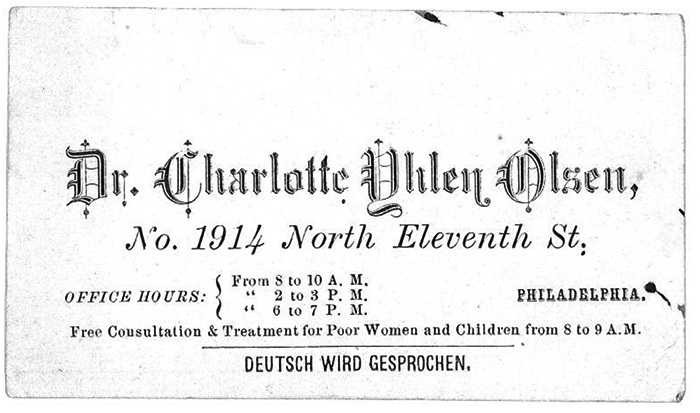

Charlotte Yhlen (later Olsen, November 19, 1839 – January 4, 1920) was the first female Swedish physician.

== Early life and education ==
Born Charlotte Yhlen on November 19, 1842, she was the eldest of three children of a shoemaker in Helsingborg. Her only education in Sweden was primary education. In Sweden, it was not yet permitted for females to study at universities.

She emigrated to the United States in 1868. In America, however, she studied medicine at the Woman's Medical College of Pennsylvania, where she graduated as a physician in 1873. Her thesis was on the subject of glaucoma. She was the first Swedish woman to graduate as a physician from a university in the United States, though Karolina Widerström was the first woman to do so in Sweden.

== Career ==
Yhlen returned to Sweden in 1873 and was elected the first female delegate at the Nordic Science Conference in Copenhagen. During this time she began corresponding with teacher Nielsine Nielsen, who went on to become the first female doctor in Denmark.

When she returned to Sweden, she applied to practice medicine, but her foreign degree was not accepted there. However, the universities were opened to women in Sweden in 1870, and she was accepted as a student at the Uppsala University, however, she did not complete her studies there, but returned to the United States, where she worked as a physician at the Woman's Hospital of Philadelphia and then opened her own practice.

In 1874, she married the Norwegian engineer Tinius Olsen and they had two children. In the mid-1870s, Tinius borrowed money from Charlotte to start a company in his own name; his material tester, The Little Giant, became an immediate worldwide success. The company is still in business in 2026.

She died January 4, 1920, and was interred at West Laurel Hill Cemetery in Bala Cynwyd, Pennsylvania.

== Sources ==
- Elianne Riska: Medical Careers and Feminist Agendas: American, Scandinavian, and Russian ...
- Brev till Rudolf Schmidt 1866-02-21 & 1866-06-24, Håndskriftsamlingens Brevbase, Det Kongelige bibliotek, Köpenhamn
- Fred Edge, Iron Rose, University of Manitoba press, 1992, s. 81
- Twenty-first annual announcement of the Woman’s medical college of Pennsylvania, Records of W/MCP Publications 1850–present, Archives & special collections, Drexel university college of Medicine
- A thesis on glaucoma, Records of W/MCP Medical Students 1850–1981, Archives & special collections, Drexel university college of Medicine
- Nils Eriksson, "I andans kraft, på sannings stråt-":De skandinaviska naturforskarmötena 1839–1936, Acta Universitatis Gothoburgensis, 1991, s. 230-31
- Maria Cederschiöld, En banbryterska: Skildringar från Ellen Fries’ studentår i Uppsala: Ur hennes bref och anteckningar, Stockholm, 1913
- Brev till Johannes Steenstrup 1899–1919, Håndskriftsamlingens Brevbase, Det Kongelige bibliotek, Köpenhamn
