= Georgianna Rumbley =

19th-century African-American woman physician

Georgianna A. Rumbley M.D.
- Born: January 1, 1852; Richmond, Virginia
- Died: July 3, 1894 (aged 42); Washington, DC
- Education: Howard University
- Occupation: Physician
- Known for: 19th-century African-American physician

Georgianna A. Rumbley (January 1, 1852 – July 3, 1894) was a 19th-century medical doctor, and one of 115 Black women licensed to practice medicine in the United States; the number would decline significantly into the 20th century.

== Early life and education ==
Georgianna Rumbley was born in Richmond, Virginia, the daughter of Elizabeth Doker Rumbley (1822-1860) and George Rumbley (1816-1905). She had three older sisters, Susan Rumbley (c1838-?), Sarah Adelaine Rumbley Crawford (1843–1886) and Mary E. Rumbley (1849-?). She graduated from the Howard University normal and musical departments, attending from 1870 to 1874. She then attended the Howard University Medical College (now the College of Medicine) from 1877 to 1879, and again 12 years later from 1891 to 1894. She graduated with an M.D.

== Career ==
Records of her are scant, but she may be the "Georgiana" Rumbley who is listed as a teacher in Cedar Grove, North Carolina in 1868, when she would have been 16. The records show that she had not arrived by the time of the listing, so she may not have gone at all. That same year she is also listed with the two-n spelling as a teacher in Hillsborough, North Carolina, eight miles away, with no record of her having gone in person. Her name is occasionally spelled Georgiana with one "n" in newspapers as well, although it was listed with two in her graduation documents.

Her name appears twice as a Presbyterian home (meaning within the U.S.) missionary teacher in the second annual report from the Freedmen's Department of the Presbyterian Committee of Home Missions, listing her as Mrs. and living in Florence, Alabama.

== Personal life ==
There is no record of her marriage (she is incorrectly listed on Ancestry as married to John Richard Bailey and her records are confused with Annie E. Bailey), but Lamb lists her as a widow. Rumbley died of diabetes on July 3, 1894, in Philadelphia, Pennsylvania. The executor of her will was Howell L. Goins, who is mentioned in a letter to Booker T. Washington as a person he would have known.
