= Margaret Craighill =

American psychiatrist

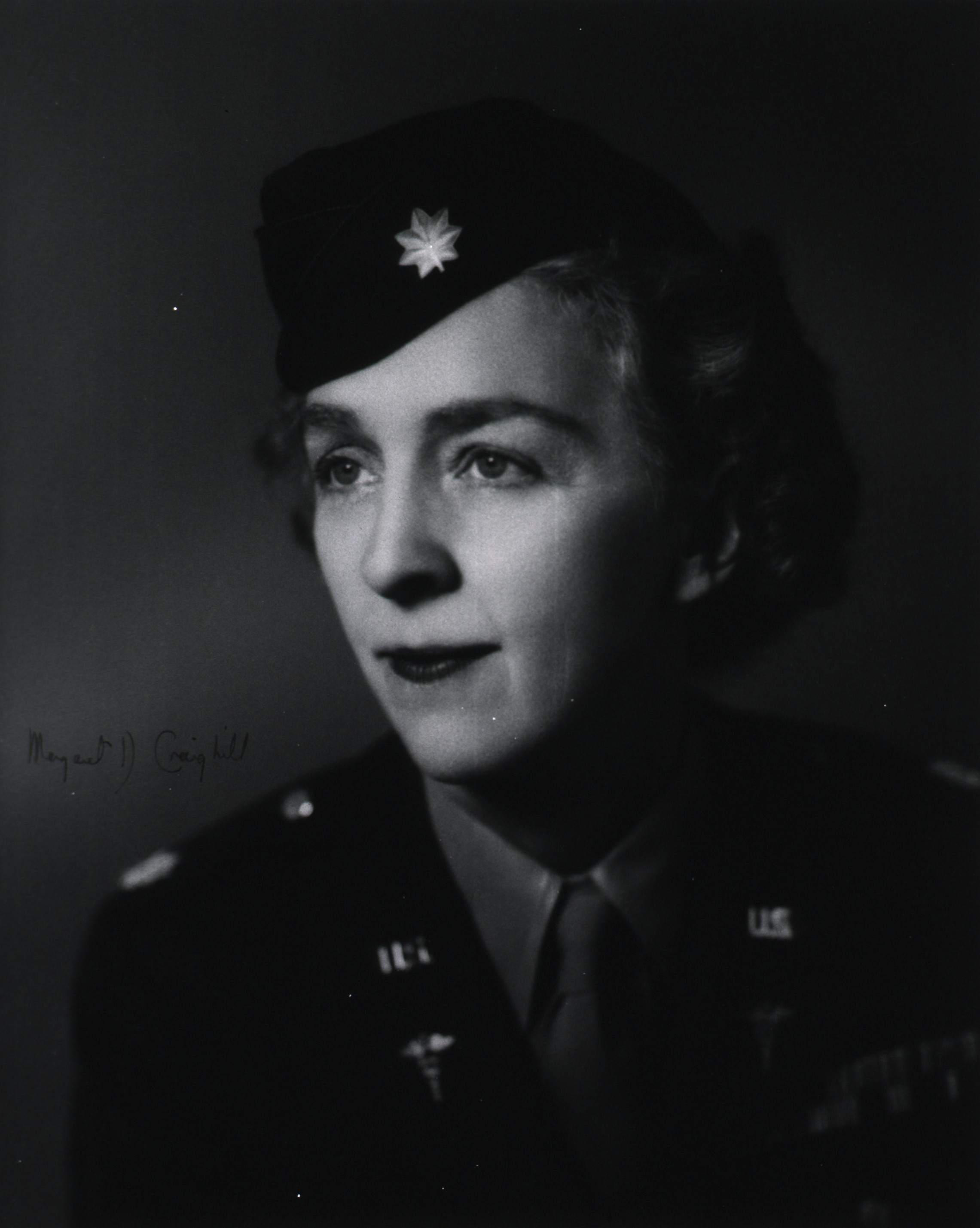
Margaret D. Craighill

Margaret Dorothea Craighill (October 16, 1898 – July 20, 1977) was an American psychiatrist. She was born in Southport, North Carolina, the daughter of Colonel William E. Craighill and Mrs. Mary (Wortley Montague Byram) Craighill. Craighill was a third generation officer following in the footsteps of her grandfather, Brigadier General William Price Craighill, and her father. Both men graduated from the United States Military Academy, commonly referred to as West Point, in West Point, New York. On May 28, 1943, she became the first woman commissioned officer in the United States Army Medical Corps. Major Craighill served through World War II and afterward worked with the Veterans Administration. She died on July 20, 1977, aged 78, in Southbury, Connecticut.

== Early career ==
Craighill received her Bachelor of Arts (BA) and Master of Science (MS) degrees from the University of Wisconsin–Madison, finishing her studies in 1921. Upon graduation, she briefly worked as a physiologist with the Chemical Warfare Department of the United States Army at Edgewood Arsenal in Aberdeen Proving Ground, Maryland. After this, Craighill enrolled at Johns Hopkins University School of Medicine, and graduated with her Doctor of Medicine (MD) in 1924. During the years of 1925 and 1926 she was an Assistant Instructor of Pathology at Yale University. After 1926, Craighill served as an assistant resident of Gynecology at Johns Hopkins Hospital in Baltimore, Maryland until 1928.

After leaving Johns Hopkins, Craighill worked as an assistant surgeon under Dr. J. A. McCreery at Bellevue Hospital in New York City, New York. At the same time, she also privately practiced obstetrics and gynecology in Greenwich, Connecticut, and held a position as an assistant surgeon and attending gynecologist at Greenwich Hospital. She stayed at Bellevue and Greenwich until 1937.

In 1940 Craighill became the Dean of the Women's Medical College of Pennsylvania (WMC) in Philadelphia. In 1941, Craigill proposed a progressive plan that included curriculum, relationships between students and faculty, and the conduct of the teaching hospital. Simultaneously, Craighill was an assistant gynecologist and obstetrician at Philadelphia General Hospital. During her tenure as dean, Craighill was responsible for widespread reform throughout the college that included the curriculum, the teaching hospital, and student-faculty relations. In 1943, Craighill requested a leave of absence from the college to enter the military.

== World War II ==
After President Franklin Delano Roosevelt signed the Sparkman-Johnson Bill, which allowed women to enlist in the army and navy Medical Corps, Craighill signed up. On May 28, 1943, she became the first woman commissioned officer in the United States Army Medical Corps.

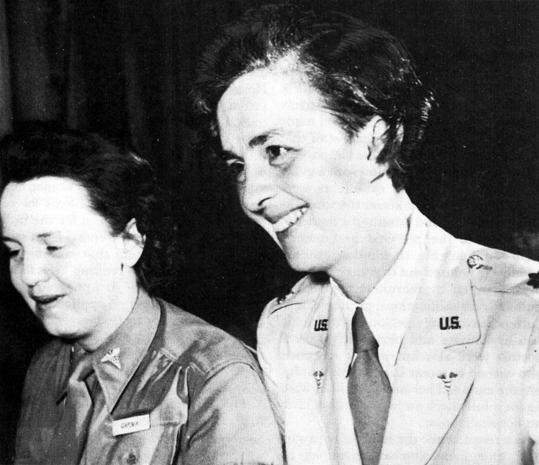
Major Margaret D. Craighill, the first woman Medical Corps officer, with Dr. Elizabeth Garber (left), a WAAC on the hospital staff at Fort Des Moines. Both were sworn into the Medical Corps of the U.S. Army.

Craighill was assigned as the Women's Consultant to the Surgeon General of United States Army commanding the Women's Health and Welfare Unit and liaison duty with the Women's Army Corps (WAC). During her military service, she was responsible for inspection of the field conditions for all women in the United States Army. This included providing medical care after enlistment, and recommending hygiene courses and other preventative measures, as well as establishing the standards for screening applicants into the Women's Army Corps and for Women's Army Corps medical care. She also met with a board of army doctors to create set standards of acceptability, and these were shortly published. Craighill was also responsible for advising the assignment of women medical officers. She recommended that women be assigned positions that were based on their professional qualifications rather than on their gender.

In 1944–1945, Craighill conducted an inspection tour which took eight and half months to complete and carried her to areas all around the world. Over the course of her military career, Craighill traveled roughly 56,000 miles to places such as Europe, Africa, Asia, and the Southwest Pacific Area (SWPA). She proved that women could survive multiple types of climates and were just as suited as men for the military. One of the first things she set out to do was discover the cause of medical errors. Unfortunately, the problem was that most locations were simply not providing medical care. In fact, gynecological conditions were often overlooked because the same examination given to men was used on women. Craighill at once secured that gynecological and psychiatric examinations were to be given to every Women's Army Corps applicant. Craighill pushed to have at least one consultant in gynecology and obstetrics to be appointed by the Office of the Surgeon General, but she was unsuccessful and these specific matters were instead handled by Surgical Services.

During her time was the Woman's Consultant, Craighill also documented pregnancy rates in women in the WAC, as well as terminated pregnancy rates. Craighill suggested that women who had abortions should be retrained in the corps instead of dishonorably discharged. Craighill argued that an abortion does not suggest that the woman has an undesirable character, nor does it mean that she will be a bad influence in the Army.

Craighill was also interested in the mental state of women in the military. At the time of her appointment, there was no research done on the analysis of women with psychiatric disorders that could possibly result in them being rejected from the military. She visited Army training hospitals and observed that inadequate, or even no mental health screenings at all, were being conducted for female recruits. In an attempt to solve this reoccurring issue, Craighill stressed the importance of giving psychiatric examiners a standard and definitive instructions for evaluating mental health. She also requested that mental health units were set up in WAC training centers to improve the performance of psychiatric examiners. These requests were not placed into effect until the spring of 1944 when Colonel William C. Menninger was appointed as the head of the Surgeon General's Neuropsychiatric Division.

For her distinguished service in World War II, Craighill was promoted to lieutenant colonel and awarded the Legion of Merit.

== Post-war ==
On April 8, 1946, Craighill separated from the United States Army and returned briefly to the Women's Medical College of Pennsylvania in Philadelphia. Craighill resigned from the college after an unsuccessful attempt to merge medical classes with Jefferson Medical School in Philadelphia to introduce co-education at her female medical school. Craighill's rejected proposal requested that Jefferson Medical College accept at least 20 percent female students because she believed that the Women's Medical College would not be able to financially provide an excellent medical education to women. In 1946, she accepted a surgical position with the Veterans Administration (VA) at Winter Veterans Hospital in Topeka, Kansas, and resided as chief of the psychosomatic section of the Winter VA Hospital from 1948 to 1951. During her tenure, Craighill also served as Chief Consultant of the Medical Care of Women Veterans. This position was the first of its kind within the Veterans Administration. She was responsible for the oversight of the medical care of women veterans, along with nine other branch section chiefs stationed around the country.

In 1946, Craighill went back to school, under the G.I. Bill, to study psychiatry at the Menninger Foundation School of Psychiatry in Topeka, Kansas, where she was a member of their first class. She graduated from the New York Institute of Psychoanalysis in 1952. From 1951 to 1960, Craighill began her own private practice in medicine and psychoanalysis in New Haven, Connecticut. Craighill also served as the chief psychiatrist in residence at the Connecticut College for Women in New London. She wrote many publications over the psyche of women in the army and one, in particular, was titled Psychiatric Aspects of Women Serving in the Army. In this, she differentiates between two categories: the nurses and the Women's Army Corps.

Margaret D. Craighill died at the age of 78 on July 20, 1977, at her home in Heritage Village, Southbury, Connecticut. She was twice widowed, by Dr. James Vickers and Alexander S. Wotherspoon, respectively. She had no children.

== Quotes ==
"I believe in being very realistic about medicine for women...The satisfaction and reward must come from within, not from without." (January 12, 1944, Bryn Mawr College)

"I must acknowledge that I am feeling discouraged over any progress that I can make in regard to establishing better conditions for women doctors. There is such a deep rooted prejudice which arises in such unexpected places, it leaves me completely baffled sometimes."
