= Tinius Olsen =

Norwegian-born, American engineer and inventor (1845–1932)

- Born: December 7, 1845; Kongsberg, Norway
- Died: 20 October 1932 (aged 86); Philadelphia, Pennsylvania, U.S.
- Burial place: West Laurel Hill Cemetery, Bala Cynwyd, Pennsylvania, U.S.
- Occupations: Mechanical engineer, inventor, company founder
- Known for: Invented the universal testing machine Founder of the Tinius Olsen Material Testing Machine Company
- Spouse: Charlotte Yhlen
- Awards: Elliott Cresson Medal; Royal Norwegian Order of St. Olav

Tinius Olsen (December 7, 1845 – October 20, 1932) was a Norwegian-born, American mechanical engineer and inventor. He was a pioneer in the field of materials science; invented the universal testing machine; and founded the Tinius Olsen Material Testing Machine Company. His machines were used in quality and strength testing of materials used in manufacturing for the arms industry, automotive industry, and heavy industry. He was awarded the Elliott Cresson Medal in 1891 and the Royal Norwegian Order of St. Olav in 1907 for his engineering achievements. He founded the Fagskolen Tinius Olsen, a vocational school, in Kongsberg, Norway.

== Early life and education ==
Olsen was born December 7, 1845, in Kongsberg, Norway. He was one of eight children. Olsen graduated in 1866 from a technical school in Horten, Norway.

== Career ==
Olsen worked as a foreman of the machine department at a large naval machine shop. He emigrated to the United States in 1869 and worked as a designer at William Sellers & Co. from 1869 to 1871.

He met the Riehle brothers, who owned a small workshop, and helped them produce engineering designs for a machine to test the strength of steel used in the manufacture of boilers. Numerous boiler explosions occurred at the time, especially on steamboats travelling on the Mississippi River. He worked for the Riehle brothers as director of the manufacturing plant in 1872.

He was a pioneer in the field of materials science and won several awards for his work. He asked to be a partner in the business but was denied. The development of his testing machine and the subsequent specifications for materials used in manufacturing, mostly eliminated boiler explosions.

In the mid-1870s, he borrowed money from his wife to start his own company. He worked on the development of a universal testing machine to determine the quality and strength of materials used in manufacturing.

In 1880, he submitted a patent application for an improved testing machine and the patent was on issued on June 1, 1880. The machine was used in the arms industry and the automotive industry including in the manufacture of the Huppmobile.

The Olsen Little Giant Testing Machine was a customer favorite as it could handle materials up to 100,000 pounds and provided tensile testing, compressive strength, and tranverse testing. Several heavy industry companies used the Olsen Little Giant Testing Machine including Baldwin Locomotive Works, Cramp Shipbuilding, Homestead Steel Company, and the Pennsylvania Railroad.

He was a member of the American Association for the Advancement of Science, the American Society for Testing Materials, and the Society for the Promotion of Engineering Education.

Olsen was awarded the Royal Norwegian Order of St. Olav in 1907. He retired from the company in 1929.

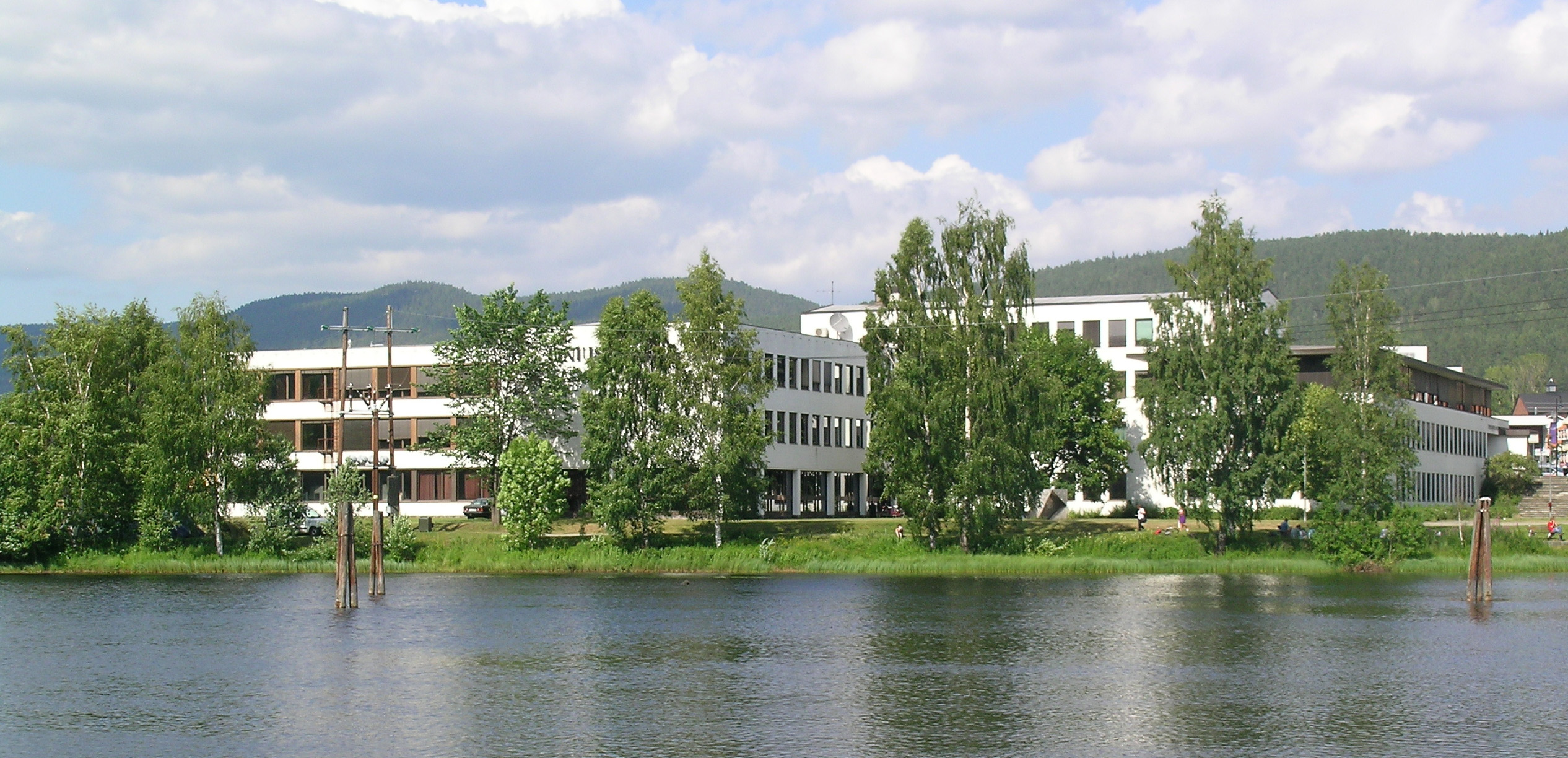
Fagskolen Tinius Olsen in Kongsberg, Norway

Olsen provided the endowment to found the Fagskolen Tinius Olsen, a technical school, in Kongsberg. He intended it to be similar to Drexel Institute in Philadelphia and provide a scientific education to both men and women.

Olsen died October 20, 1932, and was interred at West Laurel Hill Cemetery in Bala Cynwyd, Pennsylvania.

== Legacy ==
Memorial bust of Olsen in Kongsberg, Norway

The citizens of Kongsberg erected a monument in 1928 in honor of his engineering achievements and philanthropy. He was made the first honorary citizen of Kongsberg in 1930. The Tinius Olsen Plads is a square in Kongsberg where the Fagskolen Tinius Olsen was built.

Olsen bequethed money to Horten Technical School and Kongsberg Church as well as grants to a retirement home in his wife's home town of Helsingborg, Sweden.

== Personal life ==
He married Charlotte Yhlen and together they had two children.

== Patents ==
- U.S. patent 212,107, Improvement in testing-machines, 1879
- U.S. patent 212,734, Tinius Olsef, 1879
- U.S. patent 213,525, Improvement in testing-machines, 1879
- U.S. patent 213,586, Improvement in testing-machines, 1879
- U.S. patent 213,998, Improvement in testing-machines, 1879
- U.S. patent 228,214, Testing-machine, 1880
- U.S. patent 445,476, Recording testing-machine, 1891
- U.S. patent 1,141,822, Proof-testing machine, 1915
- U.S. patent 1,141,881, Machine for testing hardness, 1915
- U.S. patent 1,375,604, Hammer-testing machine, 1921
- U.S. patent 1,474,545, Testing machine, 1923
- U.S. patent 1,595,724, Centrifugal balancing device, 1926
- U.S. patent 1,811,210, Lever for testing machine weighing systems, 1931

== Additional reading ==
- Lovoll, Odd Sverre (1999) The Promise of America (Minneapolis, MN: University of Minnesota Press)
- Bjork, Kenneth (1947) Saga in Steel and Concrete Norwegian Engineers in America (Northfield, MN: Norwegian-American Historical Association)
- Tatnall, Francis G. (1925) Evolution of the Testing Machine (Philadelphia: Riehl Brothers Testing Machine Co.)
