= Los Angeles County Medical Association =

Professional organization

Los Angeles County Medical Association
- Formation: 1871
- Type: professional association
- Headquarters: Los Angeles, California
- Location: United States
- Official Language: English
- Website: http://www.lacmanet.org

Los Angeles County Medical Association (LACMA) is a professional organization representing physicians from every medical specialty and practice setting as well as students, interns and residents. The organization was founded in 1871 and is a constituent of the California Medical Association (CMA). It advocates quality care for all patients and provides services to meet the professional needs of its physician members. The group serves to represent its professional members in public policy, government relations, and community relations. LACMA, together with CMA physicians, strives to preserve and protect the noble pursuit of healthcare delivery.

== History ==
The Los Angeles County Medical Association was founded on January 31, 1871 by a group of 7 physicians. The group consisted of Dr. John Griffin, Dr. Joseph Widney, Dr. Henry Orme, Dr. William Edgar, Dr. Levi Dorr, and Dr. T. H. Rose. Over the remainder of the 19th century, the group contributed to founding Los Angeles’ first hospitals and clinics, including the "College of Medicine" in 1885 at the University of Southern California, with Joseph Widney as Dean. In 1891, Joseph Widney would become president of USC while still remaining dean of the medical school.

In addition to curing disease and caring for patients, the organization today is committed to battling escalating healthcare costs, the advent of managed care and rampant malpractice lawsuits.

== Governance ==
The LACMA Board is composed of geographic district councilors, a medical student councilor and a medical student alternate councilor, a resident/fellow councilor and a resident/fellow alternate councilor, councilors-at-large, a young physician councilor, non-geographic district councilor and the officers of the Association.

== Districts ==
LACMA serves a total of 10 different districts, each with their own board of governors. Local LACMA districts were drawn up according to local needs. Some of the first few districts included Pasadena, Pomona, Long Beach, and Santa Monica. Today, the organization consists of the districts:

- Metropolitan Los Angeles
- Pasadena/San Gabriel Valley
- Long Beach
- Bay
- West San Fernando Valley/Santa Clarita Valley
- Beverly Hills
- Southwest
- Southeast
- Foothill/Pomona
- East San Fernando Valley

The districts themselves promote grassroots activities that reach local and state level officials.

== Membership ==
Membership in LACMA is open to all medical students, residents, and physicians in LA County. As members of LACMA, physicians are part of a voice for reform of healthcare within California and nationally.

Benefits Include:

- Jury Duty Assistance: reduces the chance of having to report for jury duty assistance
- Access to the Physician Community and Directory
- Legal Assistance: for human resource, medical, regulatory or legal issues.
- Student/Resident Benefits
- Practice Resources: provides support for physician practice management
- Advocacy: active involvement at the federal, state, and local levels
- Career and Professional Development: helps physicians reach their professional goals, including leadership development
- News and Health Benefits
- Virtual CIO: access to experienced IT managers for assistance with business technology
- Events: mixers and training events with other members of the medical community

== Advocacy ==
Representing Los Angeles County physicians, LACMA has played a role in influencing top healthcare issues. Its district structure and advisory committees allow its members to develop policy initiatives and translate them to legislative and regulatory action through media advocacy and grassroots campaigns with other partners.

LACMA has supported California's most under-served patient populations by sponsoring legislation that would increase Medi-Cal payments, which are the second-lowest in the nation.

LACMA has also been involved in keeping healthcare costs low by fighting to uphold California's Medical Injury Compensation Reform Act (MICRA), one of the nation's most successful examples of tort reform and protections against frivolous lawsuits. In 2014, LACMA joined CMA in leading the charge against Proposition 46, which would have undermined MICRA, but was soundly defeated by nearly 70 percent of Californian voters. This marked at least the 16th time LACMA and CMA have triumphed over trial attorney attempts to overturn MICRA's tort reform.

In light of the state’s implementation of the Affordable Care Act, LACMA and CMA advocate on behalf of physicians and members alike. LACMA is a consistent presence in legislative and stakeholder meetings. It also addresses member concerns regarding each distinct healthcare plan.

LACMA is also involved in the public health sector, having, for example, advanced immunization awareness in California through education and greater access.

Additionally, CMA has looked to decrease obesity in children by removing sugary beverages from school campuses and sponsored legislation to place warning labels on sugar-sweetened beverages.

LACMA maintains a regular presence at meetings for Covered California's Board of Directors, the California State Medical Board, and State Assembly and Senate committees to protect the integrity of the physician-patient relationship as well as to champion both physician and patient concerns.

== PACs ==
The Los Angeles County Medical Association political action committees (PACs) support issues and elect candidates at the State and local level that improve patient access to care and treatment, support medical students, encourage physician service to the community, advance health education, and assist patients on becoming better informed advocates for their healthcare. One-third of the Californian legislature resides in Los Angeles County, and Los Angeles County has one of the largest healthcare budgets in the nation.

== Patient Care Foundation ==
The Patient Care Foundation is a 501c3 organization specifically designed to improve patient access to care and treatment, support medical students, encourage physician service to the community, advance health education, and assist patients on becoming better informed advocates for their healthcare.

Every year, the Patient Care Foundation hosts the Los Angeles Healthcare Awards to fund scholarships for medical school students who were raised in under-served areas of Los Angeles County.

== Lawsuit ==
In 2014, LACMA filed a lawsuit against Cal MediConnect. According to the lawsuit, “the process is confusing and misleading…frail, elderly and often cognitively impaired patients in the duals project have been harmed by inadequate readiness of implementation by the state.” Goals for the lawsuit include creating a form that is at or below the sixth-grade reading level and choice to opt out of the program. The stakeholders are asking the court for a preliminary injunction to halt passive enrollment and implementation of the CCI.
